= The Great American Revolution =

Steel roller coaster in California, US

- Previously known as New Revolution (2016–2026); Revolution (1988–2015); La Revolución (1981–1987); Great American Revolution (1976–1980)
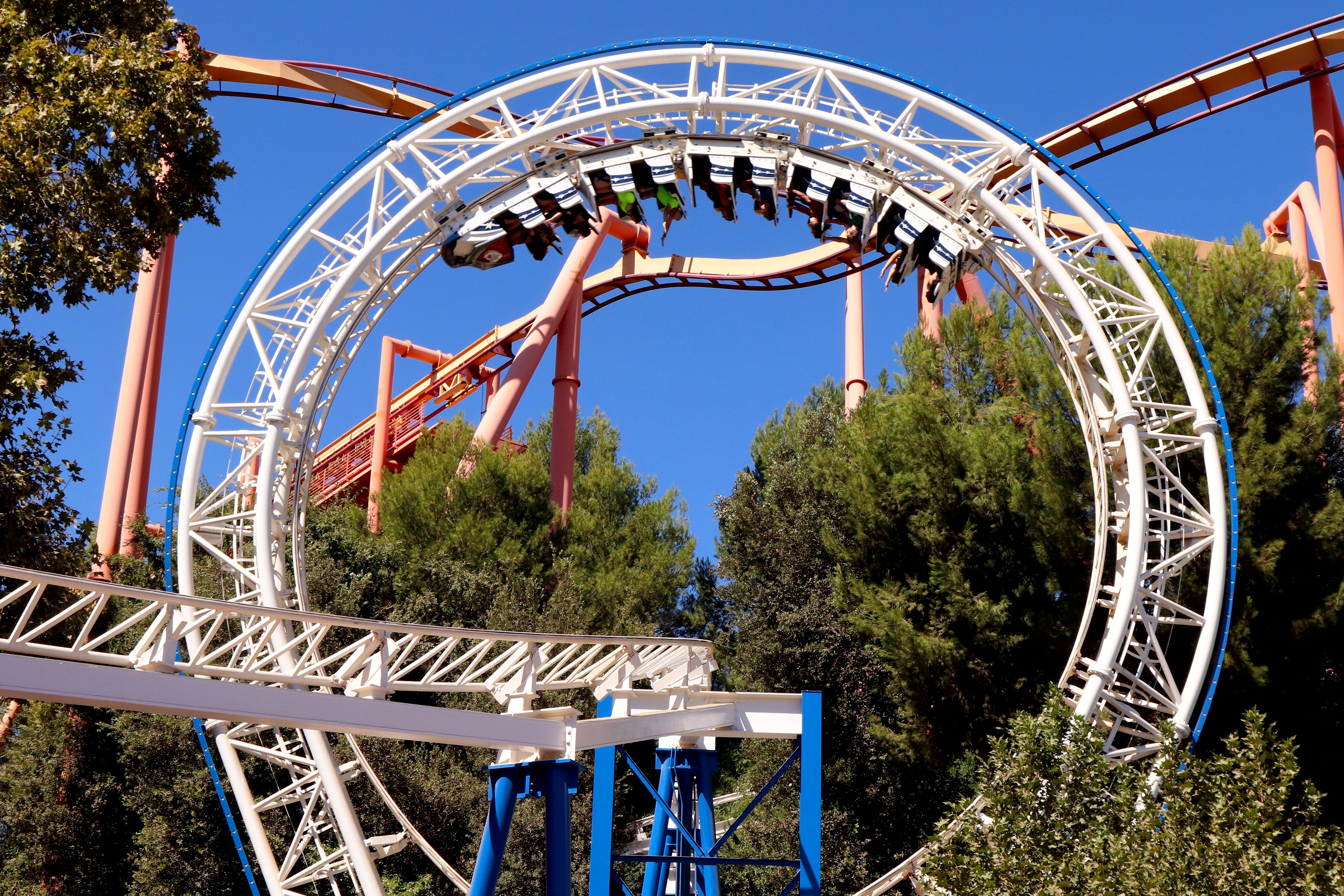
- The Great American Revolution

Six Flags Magic Mountain
- Location: Six Flags Magic Mountain
- Park section: Baja Ridge
- Coordinates: 34°25′22″N 118°35′47″W
- Status: Operating
- Opening date: May 8, 1976
- Cost: $2,000,000

General statistics
- Type: Steel
- Manufacturer: Anton Schwarzkopf
- Designer: Werner Stengel
- Model: Looping roller coaster
- Track layout: Terrain
- Lift/launch system: Chain lift hill
- Height: 113 ft (34 m)
- Drop: 83 ft (25 m)
- Length: 3,457 ft (1,054 m)
- Speed: 55 mph (89 km/h)
- Inversions: 1
- Duration: 79 seconds
- Max vertical angle: 45°
- Capacity: 1400 riders per hour
- G-force: 4.9
- Height restriction: 48 in (122 cm)
- Trains: 2 trains with 5 cars; riders arranged 2 across in 2 rows for a total of 20 riders per train
- Theme: America
- Fast Lane available
- Must transfer from wheelchair
- The Great American Revolution at RCDB

The Great American Revolution (formerly known as Revolution, The New Revolution and La Revolución) is a steel roller coaster located at Six Flags Magic Mountain in Valencia, California, United States. Manufactured by Anton Schwarzkopf and designed by Werner Stengel, the roller coaster opened to the public on May 8, 1976. The Great American Revolution is the world's first modern roller coaster to feature a vertical loop and has been recognized for that accomplishment by American Coaster Enthusiasts (ACE), who awarded the roller coaster its Coaster Landmark status. However, there were earlier examples of roller coasters with a full vertical loop, the earliest being the Centrifugal Railways of the mid- to late-1800s.

The coaster was named after the American Revolution in celebration of the country's Bicentennial. Unlike many of the previous looping roller coasters in the 19th and early-20th centuries which attempted circular loops, Revolution used a clothoid-shaped vertical loop – a first in the industry.

In 2016, the coaster received a makeover for its 40th anniversary that included new trains with lap bars and an optional virtual reality experience for riders. The New Revolution soft-launched to season pass holders on March 26, 2016, and opened to the general public on April 21, 2016.

On May 8, 2026, to commemorate its 50th anniversary, it was renamed back to the Great American Revolution for the second time.

== History ==
=== Great American Revolution ===
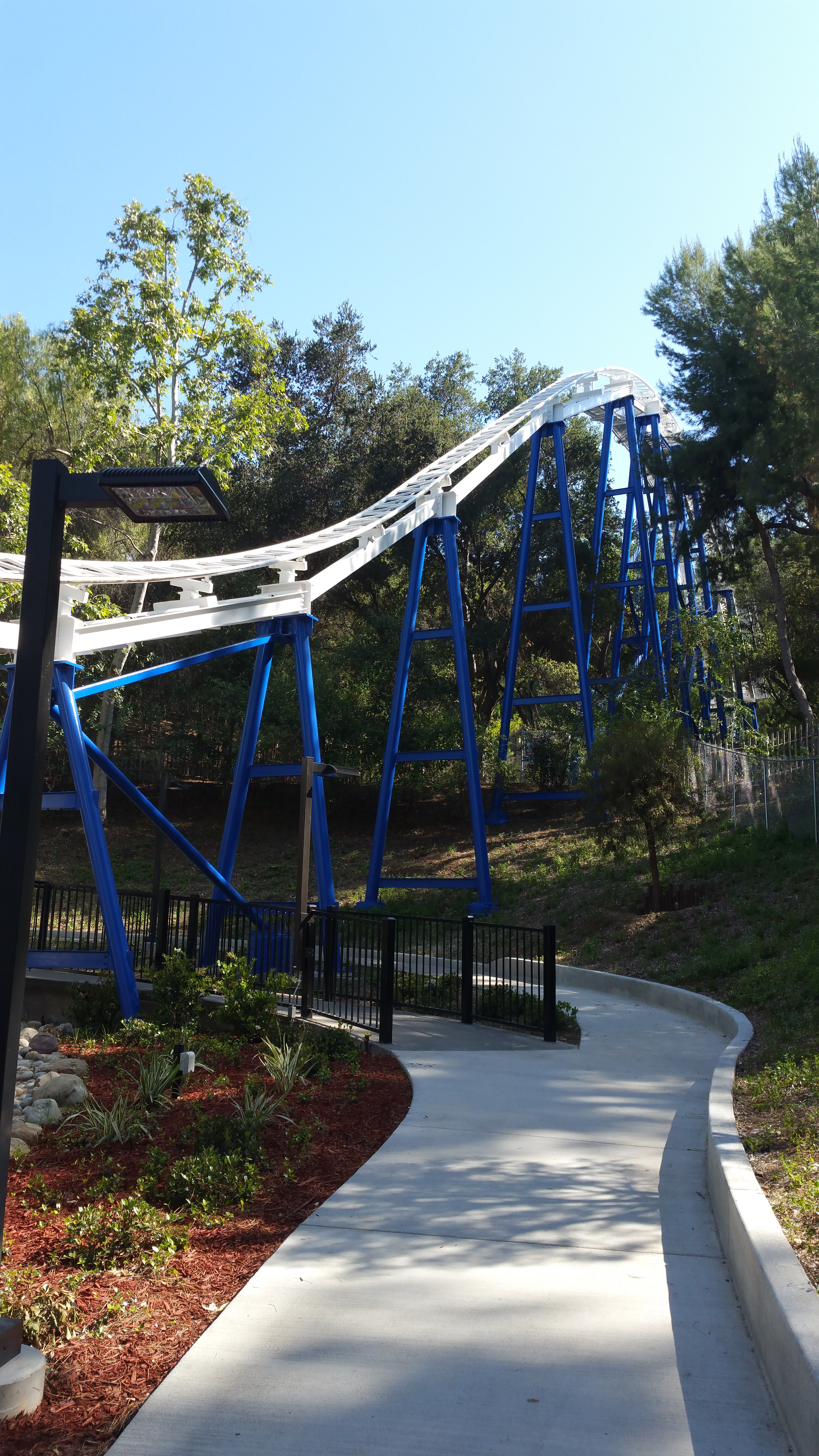
Second drop, 2016

In the mid-1970s, Magic Mountain enlisted ride manufacturer Anton Schwarzkopf and designer Werner Stengel to design and build the first modern looping roller coaster. The last known existence of one was Loop the Loop at Coney Island during the early 1900s. Prior to Great American Revolution's opening, a week of testing was needed to properly calibrate the tightness of the wheels to get the train to complete a full circuit. At the ride's opening, staff operating the ride were outfitted with Continental Army-style uniforms to match the time period of the American Revolution, which the country was celebrating for its Bicentennial.

=== La Revolución, Revolution ===
In 1979 following the purchase of the park by Six Flags, the ride's name was changed to La Revolución in honor of the Mexican Revolution. In 1988, the ride's name was changed once more to simply Revolution. In 1992, over-the-shoulder restraints were added to the trains, alongside the existing lapbars, to prevent guests from standing up.

In June 2002, a Coaster Landmark plaque awarded by American Coaster Enthusiasts (ACE) was placed near the line queue in front of the ride. The award was presented in recognition of its accomplishment as the world's first modern vertical-looping roller coaster. In 2005, parts of Revolution had to be dismantled to make way for the park's new Tatsu roller coaster that was being constructed. Revolution reopened with Tatsu on the new coaster's media day on May 11, 2006.

=== The New Revolution ===
Revolution was refurbished for the 2016 season in celebration of the roller coaster's 40th anniversary. The ride received new red and white trains, with each train's lead car featuring a silver eagle ornament mounted on the front, and the track was painted white and blue. The new trains were also fitted with lap and calf bar restraints, replacing the previous over-the-shoulder design, which Six Flags claimed would provide additional airtime and a more comfortable ride experience. The ride reopened as The New Revolution.

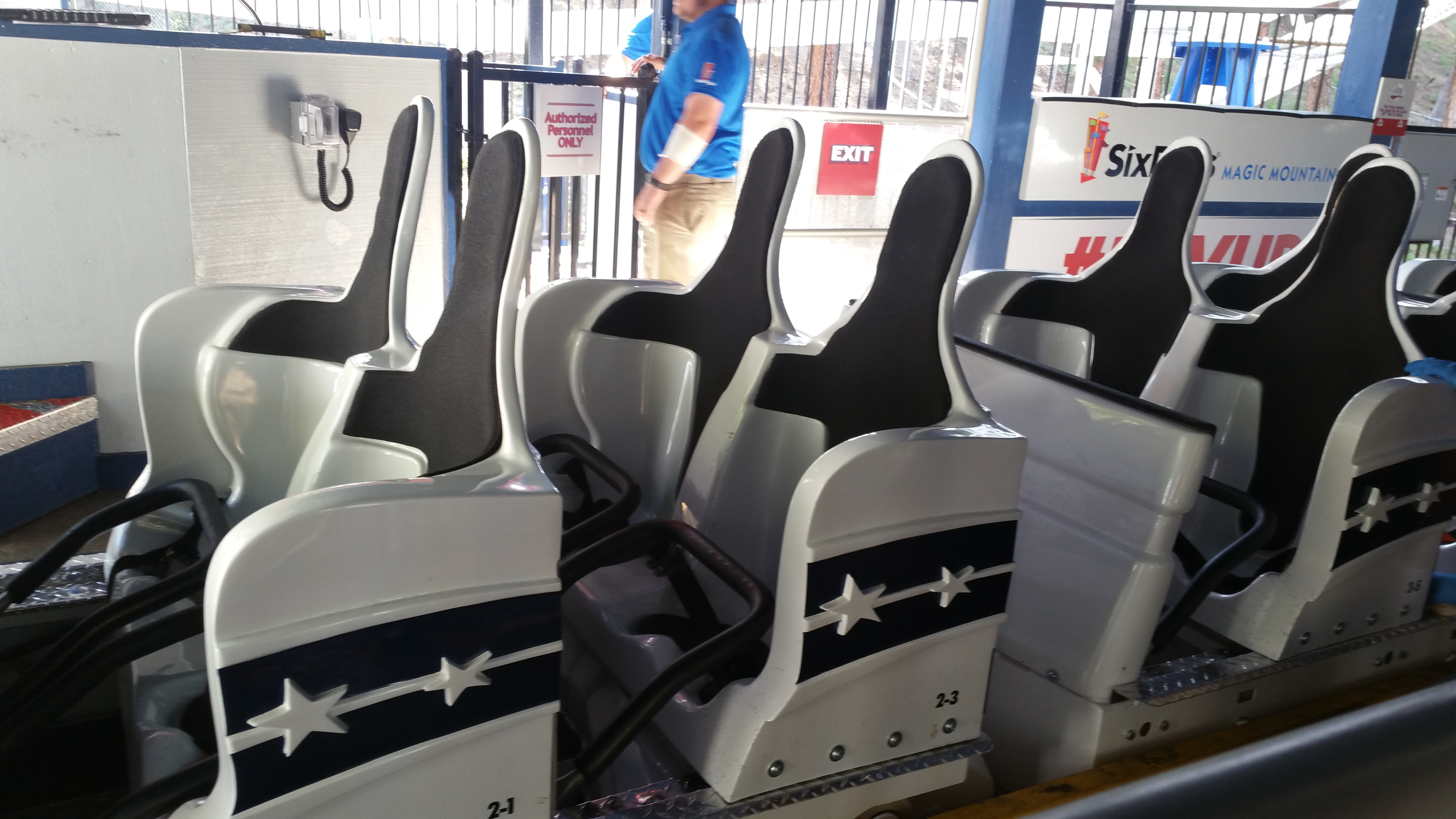
New seats on the New Revolution

The New Revolution was among several rides at various parks that received an on-ride virtual reality (VR) feature. Riders were given the option to wear Samsung Gear VR headsets, to experience a 3D virtual world themed to a fighter jet, where riders flew through a futuristic city as co-pilots battling alien invaders. The feature debuted with the coaster when it emerged from refurbishment and reopened to season pass holders on March 26, 2016. It reopened to the general public on April 21, 2016.

On February 8, 2017, Six Flags announced that The New Revolution would offer a new VR experience known as The New Revolution Galactic Attack. It was billed as the world's first mixed Virtual Reality Experience powered by Oculus VR. The experience was centered around an alien invasion in space. As riders crest the lift hill, the setting changed into an intergalactic battle seen from the cockpit of a fighter spaceship. It became available to the public on February 25.

Beginning on November 18, 2017, Six Flags debuted a new VR experience to match the "Holiday in the Park" theme. Dubbed "Santa's Wild Sleigh Ride", it placed riders in Santa's sleigh as he delivered presents to a snowy town.

In 2018, virtual reality headsets were moved to Lex Luthor: Drop of Doom.

In November 2018, The New Revolution was renamed Red Sox Revolution" temporarily after the park lost a World Series bet to Six Flags New England.

== Incidents ==
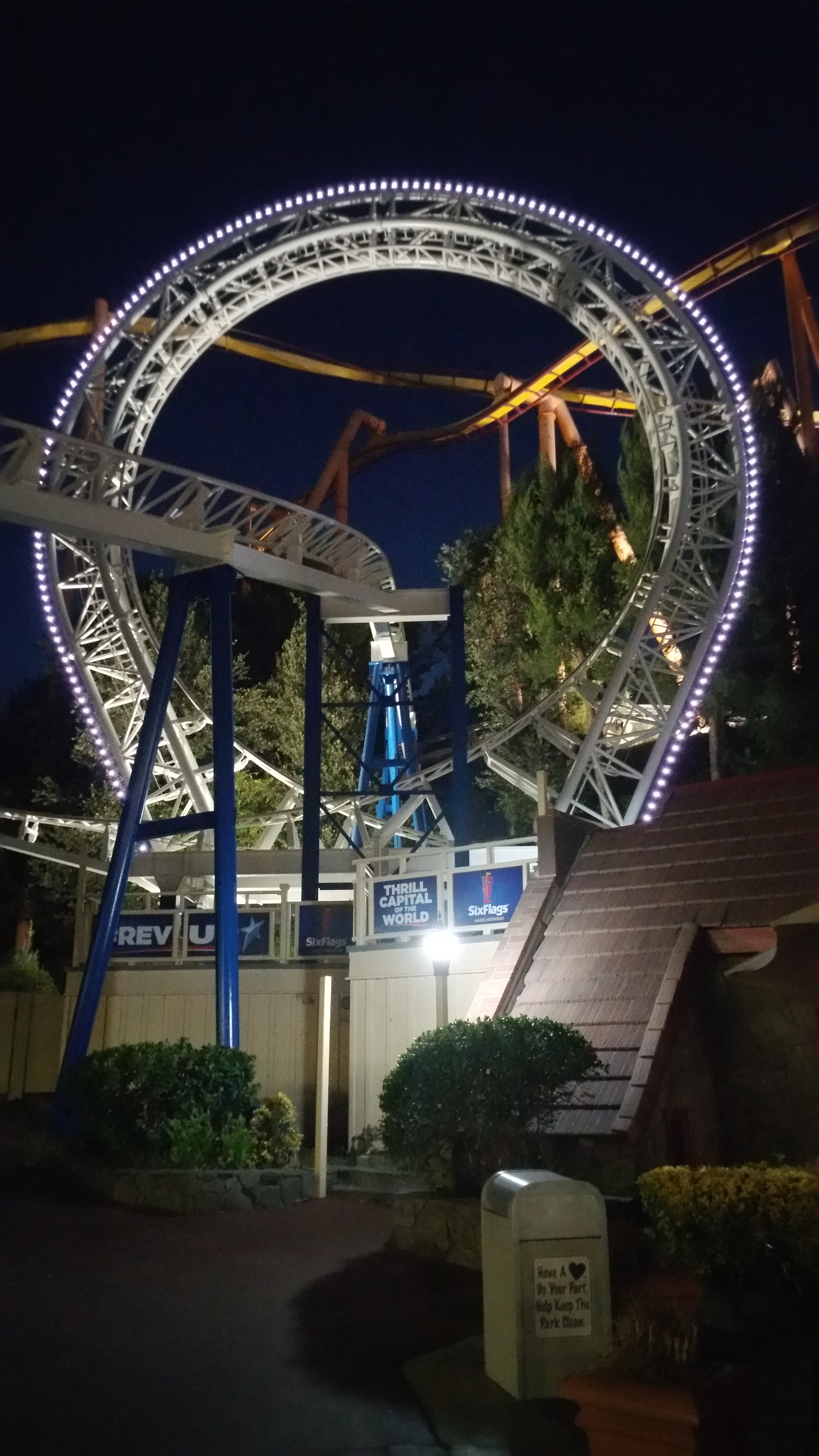
The vertical loop at night

On May 31, 1996, a park employee was hit and killed instantly while attempting to cross the tracks in the boarding station as a train was returning. The investigation determined she slipped and fell into a 4-foot (1.2 m) pit below, crossing from the side where passengers exit over to the opposite side.

On June 12, 2015, a 10-year-old girl riding the roller coaster was found breathing but unconscious after returning to the station. She was rushed to a nearby hospital and died the following day. According to the local coroner's office, she died of natural causes unrelated to the ride. At the request of the girl's family, no autopsy was performed to determine the exact cause.

== In popular culture ==
Revolution was prominently featured in the 1977 film Rollercoaster. It was also featured in the 1983 movie National Lampoon's Vacation as the Whipper Snapper.

The amusement park and roller coaster were prominently featured in the two-part, Season 3 episode of Wonder Woman entitled "Phantom of the Roller Coaster." In the episode, the coaster was called the "Superloop" and the park was called "Fun Universe," purportedly near Washington DC.

Preceded by Montaña Rusa	World's Tallest Roller Coaster; 1976–1977	Succeeded by King Kobra (tied with Greased Lightnin' and White Lightnin')
Preceded by Montaña Rusa	World's Tallest Complete Circuit Roller Coaster; 1976–1978	Succeeded by Shock Wave
