= The Riddler Mindbender =

Roller coaster at Six Flags Over Georgia

- Previously known as Mindbender (1978-2019)
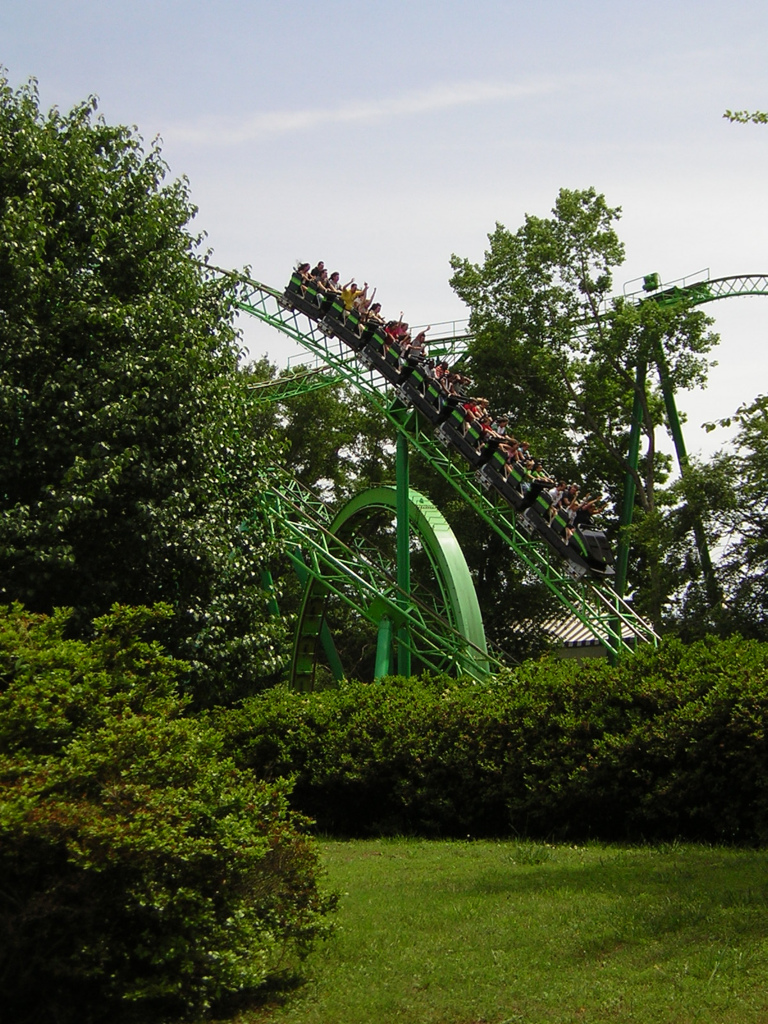
- Mindbender's second drop

Six Flags Over Georgia
- Location: Six Flags Over Georgia
- Park section: Gotham City
- Coordinates: 33°46′13″N 84°32′51″W
- Status: Operating
- Opening date: March 31, 1978
- Cost: $2.8 million

General statistics
- Type: Steel
- Manufacturer: Anton Schwarzkopf
- Designer: Werner Stengel
- Model: Custom design
- Track layout: Terrain
- Lift/launch system: Chain lift hill
- Height: 80 ft (24 m)
- Length: 3,253 ft (992 m)
- Speed: 50 mph (80 km/h)
- Inversions: 2
- Duration: 2:33
- Max vertical angle: 62°
- Capacity: 1200 riders per hour
- Height restriction: 42 in (107 cm)
- Trains: 2 trains with 7 cars; riders arranged 2 across in 2 rows for a total of 28 riders per train
- Fast Lane available
- The Riddler Mindbender at RCDB

The Riddler Mindbender, previously named Mind Bender, is a steel roller coaster located at Six Flags Over Georgia near Atlanta, Georgia. Billed as "the world's first triple-loop roller coaster" when it opened on March 31, 1978, Mindbender has maintained its popularity since its opening. In its 30th anniversary season in 2008, Mindbender was ranked #15 by Amusement Today magazine in its annual Golden Ticket Awards, and was one of only two roller coasters built before 1980 on the list; the other was its "fraternal twin," Shockwave, at Six Flags Over Texas.

== History ==
Designed by Werner Stengel and built by Anton Schwarzkopf, Mindbender would be the last original roller coaster the park would construct until the arrival of Georgia Scorcher in 1999. Since its debut, Mindbender has had three different color schemes and been counted within three different sections of the park. In its inaugural season, the attraction was part of the USA section and was silver in color. In 1979, Mindbender became part of the new Jolly Roger's Island, itself an offshoot of the USA section. The structure was painted brown during the 1980s. Throughout its first two decades, the trains were silver in color, with a rainbow-colored stripe along both sides.

In 1996, it was announced that Jolly Roger's Island would be converted into Gotham City for the 1997 season with the addition of Batman: The Ride. Mindbender was painted green to suggest that it was the creation of Batman's arch-enemy, The Riddler. A waterfall under the coaster was dyed green, and occasionally still is (although at times it retains a more natural color). The trains were painted black, and covered with green question marks, another hallmark of the Riddler. During the 2009 Southeastern United States floods, sections of the Mindbender were temporarily submerged under muddy water. The park was able to clean up and reopen the weekend following the floods.

The attraction was closed after the 2019 season to undergo a refurbishment as part of the new Gotham City section of the park planned for 2020. It was renamed The Riddler Mindbender, given a new coat of paint, an updated queue line, as well as new trains and refurbished sections of track. The new trains consisted of five cars instead of seven, and the control system was replaced in the process. The Riddler Mindbender's unveiling was delayed to 2021 due to the COVID-19 pandemic. It reopened on September 18, 2021.

== Design and operations ==
Like many modern roller coasters, Mindbender operates on the block system featuring 5 blocks: station, transfer table, lift hill, reduction brake, and ready brake. These blocks are controlled by a program running on a programmable logic controller to ensure trains do not collide with one another. To assist in the movement of trains through the brakes, station, and transfer table, a series of feed motors can move a train at slow speeds from a full stop.

Three trains were manufactured for the ride, although the ride control system is not equipped to handle all three on the track at once. One train was used as a spare, and occasionally only one is on the track during normal operation. In the 1990s, one train was dismantled to supply parts for the remaining two. Eventually, the park obtained trains from the former Schwarzkopf-designed Viper at Six Flags Astroworld. The trains had seven cars, each with four seats arranged in rows of two for a total of 28 riders per train. Passengers are restrained with a single ratcheting lap bar.

The transfer table, located between the station and the lift hill, is used to move trains to and from the maintenance building. It features one brake to secure trains in place as the table rotates; it is not used during normal operation. There is also a feed motor located on the transfer table.

The primary set of brakes that stops the trains' movement at the end of the ride are known as the reduction brakes. As a result of having no overhead protection from rain, wet conditions can cause unwanted slipping. The ride occasionally closes when these conditions become severe.

There are two sets of trim brakes on the course of the ride that reduce the speed of the train. The attraction is placed on the side of a ridge, and portions of the track – including the second vertical loop and a helix – are located in an adjacent ravine, increasing the attraction's overall elevation change. The coaster used to be advertised as a "triple looper". The ride features two vertical loops with a diving helix which doesn't actually result in an inversion sometimes considered the third loop.

== Ride experience ==
The ride begins with the train exiting the loading station, passing over the transfer track and climbing the lift hill. Once the train has reached the top of the lift, it turns right into a U-turn while traversing slightly downward. When the train nears the end of the U-turn, it travels sightly upwards nearing the height it was when it reached the top of the lift hill. The train then descends down the first drop and immediately enters the first loop. Upon exiting the loop, the train climbs a hill, levels out and reaches the first set of trim brakes.

Next, the train turns left in a slight decline before leveling out. Once leveled, it enters the diving helix into the ravine. This is achieved by the left rail lowering much more steeply than the right rail as the train descends into a left-turning helix. The train begins to climb and level out after reaching the bottom of the ravine, producing significant positive G-forces. After exiting the top of the helix, the train enters a hill followed by a U-turn and a second set of trim brakes as the track levels out.

The train then travels down another hill toward the ground and into the final loop. Upon exiting, the train passes through a tunnel and over a hill into another descending U-turn. The train ascends slightly as it completes the U-turn and enters the final brake run.

== 1984 accident ==
On June 3, 1984, a mechanical problem caused a train to stop abruptly, sending four people to a hospital. The ride was repaired and put back into service with no more problems.

== Awards ==
Golden Ticket Awards: Top steel Roller Coasters
Year									1998	1999
Ranking									12	–
Year	2000	2001	2002	2003	2004	2005	2006	2007	2008	2009
Ranking	16	17	22	26	21	21	19	21 (tie)	15	16
Year	2010	2011	2012	2013	2014	2015	2016	2017	2018	2019
Ranking	14	17	20	19	20	27	27	26	25	25
Year	2020	2021	2022	2023	2024	2025	2026			
Ranking	N/A	25	28	41 (tie)	–	–	–			

== See also ==
- Incidents at Six Flags parks
