= Looping Star (Nagashima Spa Land) =

Roller coaster in Mie, Japan

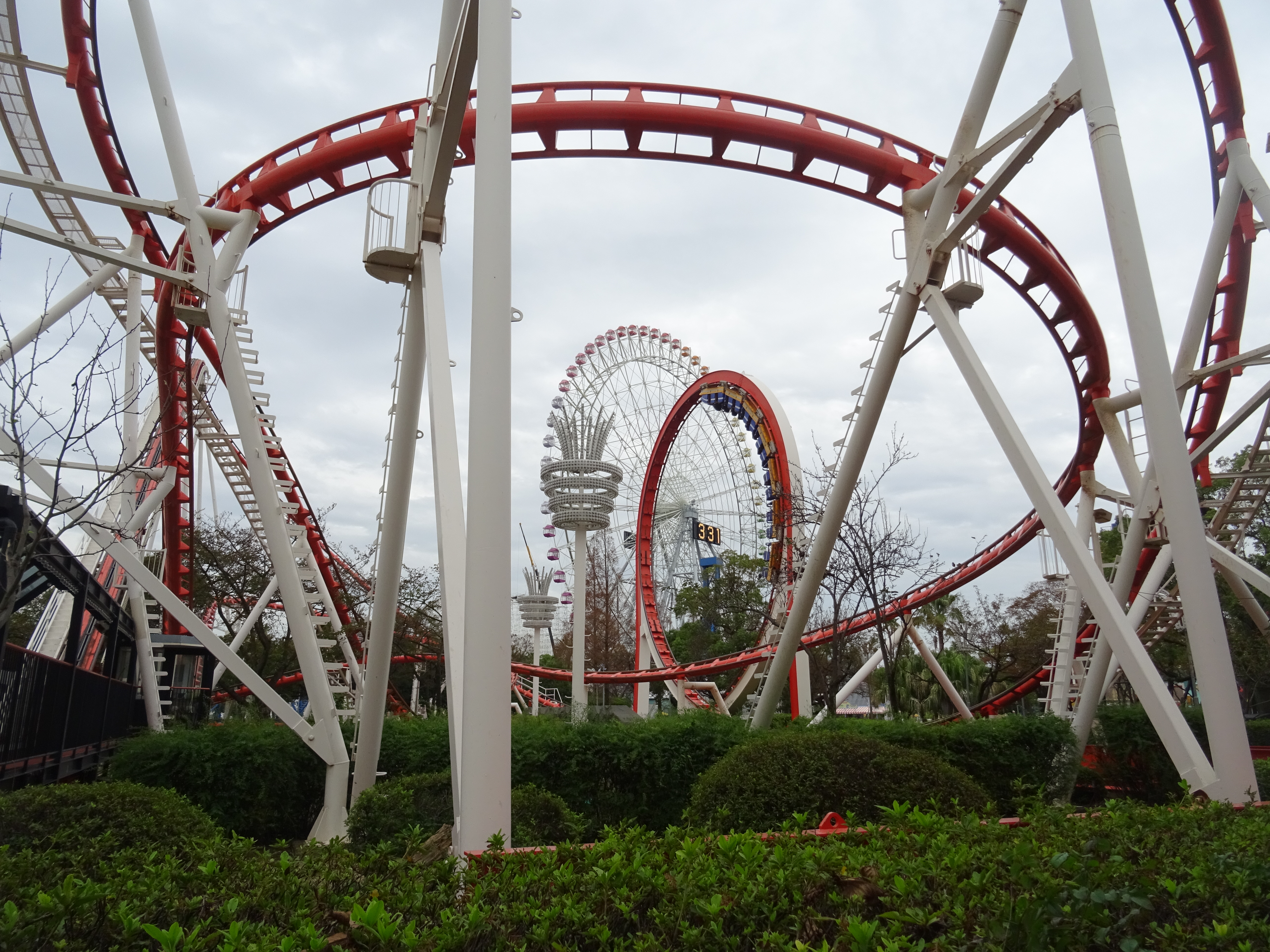

Nagashima Spa Land
- Location: Nagashima Spa Land
- Coordinates: 35.030611°N 136.732257°E
- Status: Operating
- Opening date: 1 March 1982

General statistics
- Type: Steel
- Manufacturer: Anton Schwarzkopf
- Designer: Werner Stengel
- Model: Looping Star
- Lift/launch system: Chain lift hill
- Height: 24.5 m (80 ft)
- Length: 592 m (1,942 ft)
- Speed: 76.9 km/h (47.8 mph)
- Inversions: 1
- Duration: 1:18
- Capacity: 1,700 riders per hour
- Height restriction: 121.9 cm (4 ft 0 in)
- Trains: 7 cars; riders arranged 2 across in 2 rows for a total of 28 riders per train
- Looping Star at RCDB

Looping Star (ルーピングスター) is a steel roller coaster located at Nagashima Spa Land in Mie, Japan. It is a Looping Star model built by Schwarzkopf in 1982, two years after the park’s Shuttle Loop roller coaster was built.

The trains on Looping Star use a single lap bar to hold riders in the seat. This restraint is effective since the centripetal forces from the loop and helices press riders in their seats, and are a common feature on Schwarzkopf’s looping coasters. However, the ride is known to be considerably shaky and rough. The ride originally opened with four trains, but currently operates with only two. The ride has an orange and white paint scheme with blue trains.

== Ride experience ==
As the train climbs the chain lift hill and enters the drop, it falls into a large vertical loop, and then into multiple 180-degree helixes. Then ride goes around a large 180-degree helix and into a brake run. After two small left turns and a straightaway, the train returns to the station.
