= Shock Wave (Six Flags Over Texas) =

Steel roller coaster

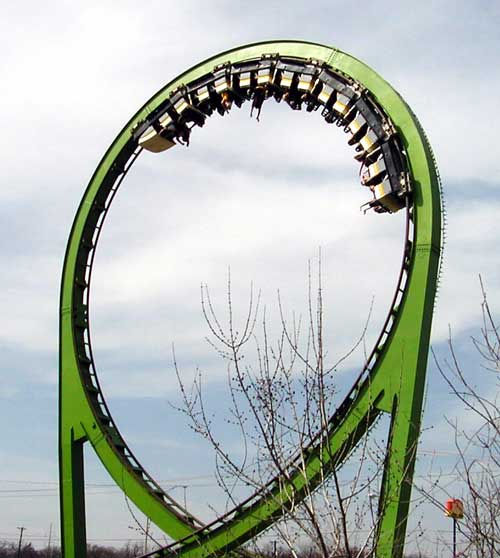

Six Flags Over Texas
- Location: Six Flags Over Texas
- Park section: Tower
- Coordinates: 32°45′32″N 97°04′14″W
- Status: SBNO (Standing But Not Operating)
- Opening date: April 22, 1978

General statistics
- Type: Steel
- Manufacturer: Anton Schwarzkopf
- Designer: Werner Stengel
- Lift/launch system: Chain lift hill
- Height: 116 ft (35 m)
- Drop: 105 ft (32 m)
- Length: 3,600 ft (1,100 m)
- Speed: 60 mph (97 km/h)
- Inversions: 2
- Duration: 2:00
- G-force: 5.9
- Height restriction: 42 in (107 cm)
- Trains: 7 cars; riders arranged 2 across in 2 rows for a total of 28 riders per train
- Fast Lane available
- Shock Wave at RCDB

Shock Wave is a steel roller coaster located at Six Flags Over Texas amusement park in Arlington, Texas, United States. Built by Anton Schwarzkopf and designed by Werner Stengel, the roller coaster opened to the public on April 22, 1978. It was briefly the tallest roller coaster in the world, surpassed later that year by Loch Ness Monster. The coaster experiences upwards of 5.5 G's during its double loops, which is currently the record highest amount of g-force offered by an operating rollercoaster.

== History ==
On October 28, 1977, Six Flags Over Texas announced that Shock Wave would be coming to the park. The ride would be a looping coaster manufactured by Anton Schwarzkopf. It would require 437,000 lb (198,000 kg) of steel and 4,800,000 lb (2,200,000 kg) of concrete to build.

Shock Wave opened to the public on April 22, 1978. At the time of its opening, it was the tallest roller coaster in the world. It lost this title within weeks upon the opening of Loch Ness Monster at Busch Gardens Williamsburg.

The ride is built on Johnson Creek real estate and had to temporarily close in the 2004 season because of a flood. Shock Wave was temporarily closed again in early 2008 for an extensive remodeling.

Six Flags announced on March 3, 2016, that Shock Wave would be among several rides at various parks that would receive a virtual reality (VR) upgrade. Riders had the option to wear Samsung Gear VR headsets, powered by Oculus, to create a 360-degree, 3D experience while riding. The virtual reality experience was called The New Revolution, themed to a fighter jet, has riders flying through a futuristic city as co-pilots battling alien invaders. The feature debuted with the coaster when it reopened in spring of 2016. For the park's annual Fright Fest, the virtual reality ride became Rage of the Gargoyles. This was discontinued the following season.

Shock Wave closed in March 2026 for an undisclosed reason and has yet to reopen.

== Ride experience ==
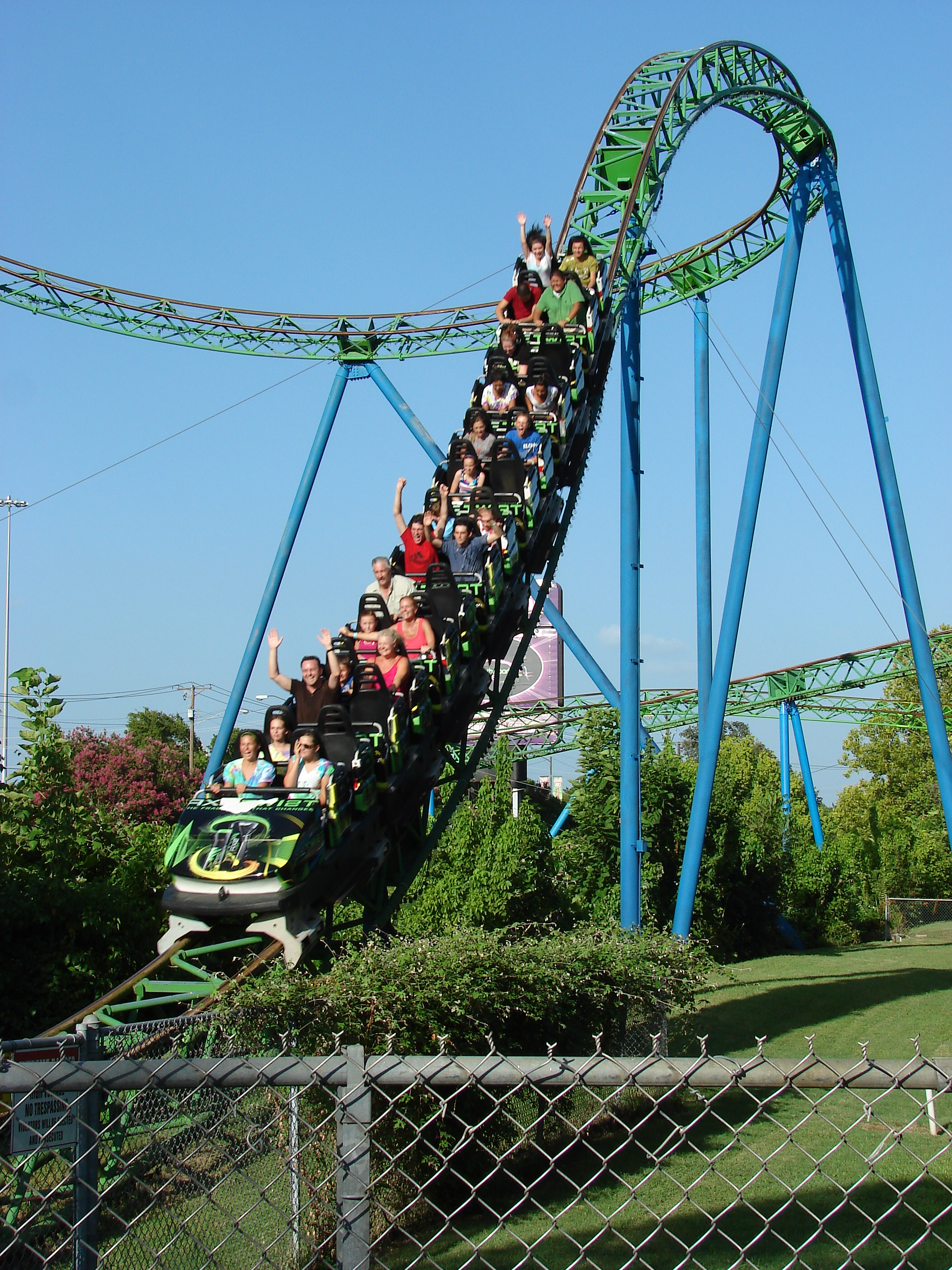
The second drop on Shock Wave (2010)

The ride starts by passing through the transfer table and up the 116-foot (35 m) lift hill. A slight dip into a right-hand U-turn leads into the first drop. The ride then negotiates two back-to-back vertical loops, and then travels up a hill into a small mid-course brake run. At this point, the ride turns right into a second U-Turn and dives down the second drop. Then quickly up a hill leading into a third U-turn to the left, over and around the ride's station. Then quickly travels down the third and final large drop. This is followed by a climb into a hill leading into a small left turn. Which leads into a long bunny hop over the creek. The ride then transitions into a 200° right turn leading into the brake run before returning to the station. The ride passes over Johnson Creek a total of four times.

== Colors ==
Throughout the years, Shock Wave has undergone several re-paintings with different color schemes. When it first opened, the attraction's track and supports were all-white. The solid white color lasted only two years as it quickly became dirty. The second color scheme, introduced in 1980, featured dark blue track and supports. Since then, the ride has been repainted light blue, then silver with navy blue supports. During Time-Warner's ownership of the park the ride was painted with white track, yellow supports and pink loops. The operators jokingly referred to the ride as "fruit loops." The seventh color scheme of blue track with red supports came about in 1996. 2001 marked the 40th anniversary of the park and Shock Wave once again was given a new coat of paint — this time royal blue supports with a bright green track. That paint job remained on the coaster until 2012, when Shock Wave was finally given a much-needed new coat of paint. Similar to the previous color scheme, the present colors are royal blue supports, with a slightly brighter shade of green track.

== Awards ==
Golden Ticket Awards: Top steel Roller Coasters
Year									1998	1999
Ranking									17	12
Year	2000	2001	2002	2003	2004	2005	2006	2007	2008	2009
Ranking	21	27	36 (tie)	34	26	37	36	35	31	34
Year	2010	2011	2012	2013	2014	2015	2016	2017	2018	2019
Ranking	37	42	26 (tie)	29	40	41	–	46	–	–
Year	2020	2021	2022	2023	2024	2025	2026			
Ranking	N/A	47	47	–	–	–	–			

Preceded by Revolution	World's Tallest Complete Circuit Roller Coaster; April 1978 – June 1978	Succeeded by Loch Ness Monster
