= Looping Star =

Looping Star is the name of several roller coasters:

- Looping Star (Clacton Pier)
- Looping Star (Nagashima Spa Land)
