= Silver Bullet (Frontier City) =

Steel roller coaster at Frontier City

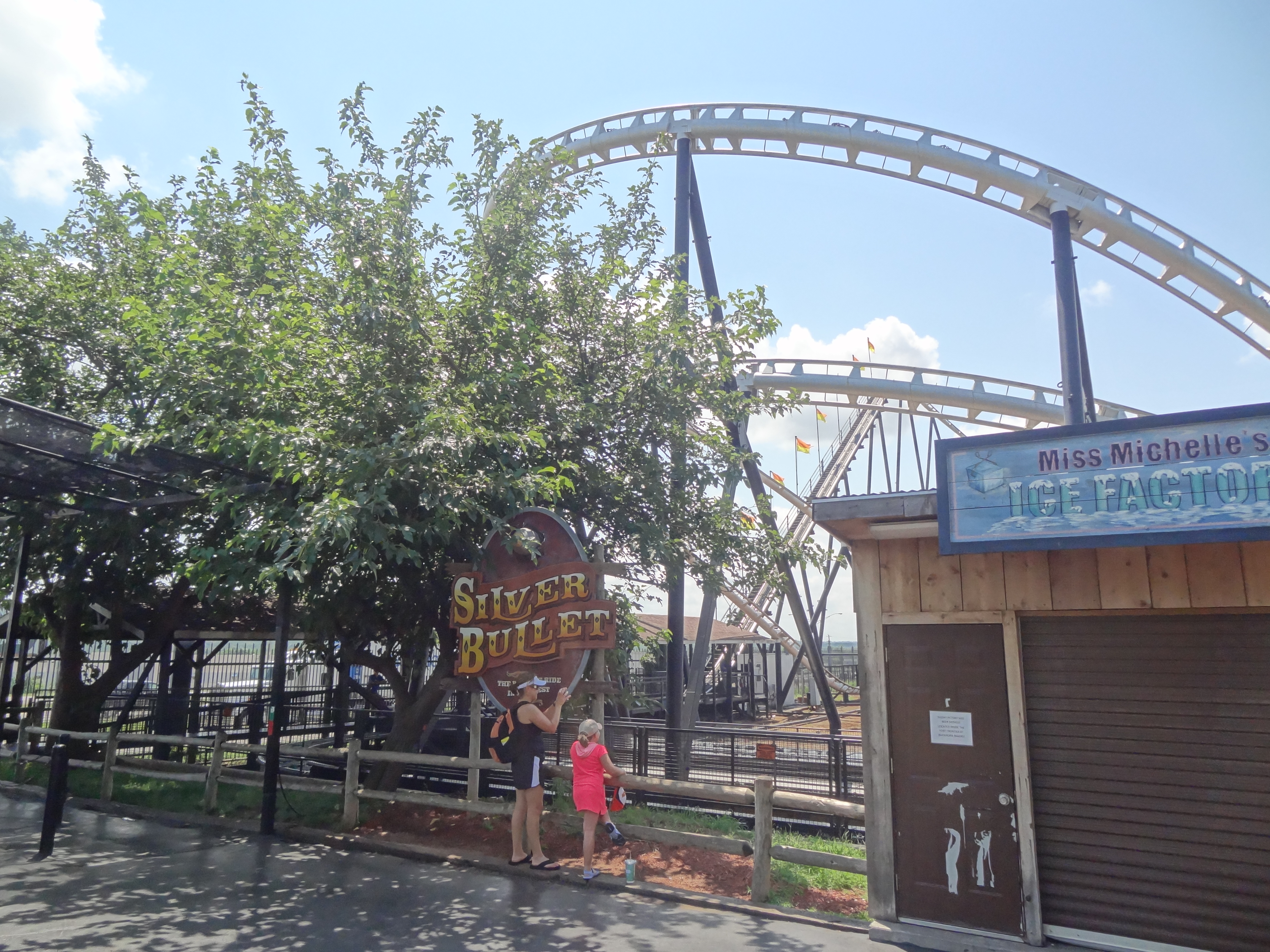

Frontier City
- Coordinates: 35.582958°N 97.441077°W
- Status: Operating
- Opening date: July 18, 1986

Jolly Roger Amusement Park
- Coordinates: 38.360°N 75.077°W
- Status: Removed
- Opening date: 1984
- Closing date: 1985

State Fair of Texas
- Coordinates: 32.782°N 96.766°W
- Status: Removed
- Opening date: 1980
- Closing date: 1983

General statistics
- Type: Steel
- Manufacturer: Anton Schwarzkopf
- Designer: Werner Stengel
- Model: Looping Star
- Track layout: Custom
- Lift/launch system: Chain lift hill
- Height: 80 ft (24 m)
- Drop: 75 ft (23 m)
- Length: 1,942 ft (592 m)
- Speed: 47.8 mph (76.9 km/h)
- Inversions: 1
- Capacity: 1700 riders per hour
- Height restriction: 48 in (122 cm)
- Fast Lane available
- Silver Bullet at RCDB

Silver Bullet is a steel Looping Star roller coaster currently operating at Frontier City in Oklahoma City, Oklahoma. Manufactured by Anton Schwarzkopf as the first transportable looping roller coaster, the ride was named Looping Star and first owned by German showmen Oscar Bruch and Fritz Kinzler. After its debut at the Cranger Kirmes in 1978, it operated on several fairs in Germany until it was sold to the State Fair of Texas in 1980. After the 1983 season it was relocated to Jolly Roger Amusement Park where it operated for the 1984 and 1985 seasons before being relocated again in 1986. At Frontier City the ride was renamed Silver Bullet and is currently the tallest roller coaster at the park and the one that has been operating there for the longest time.

== Ride experience ==
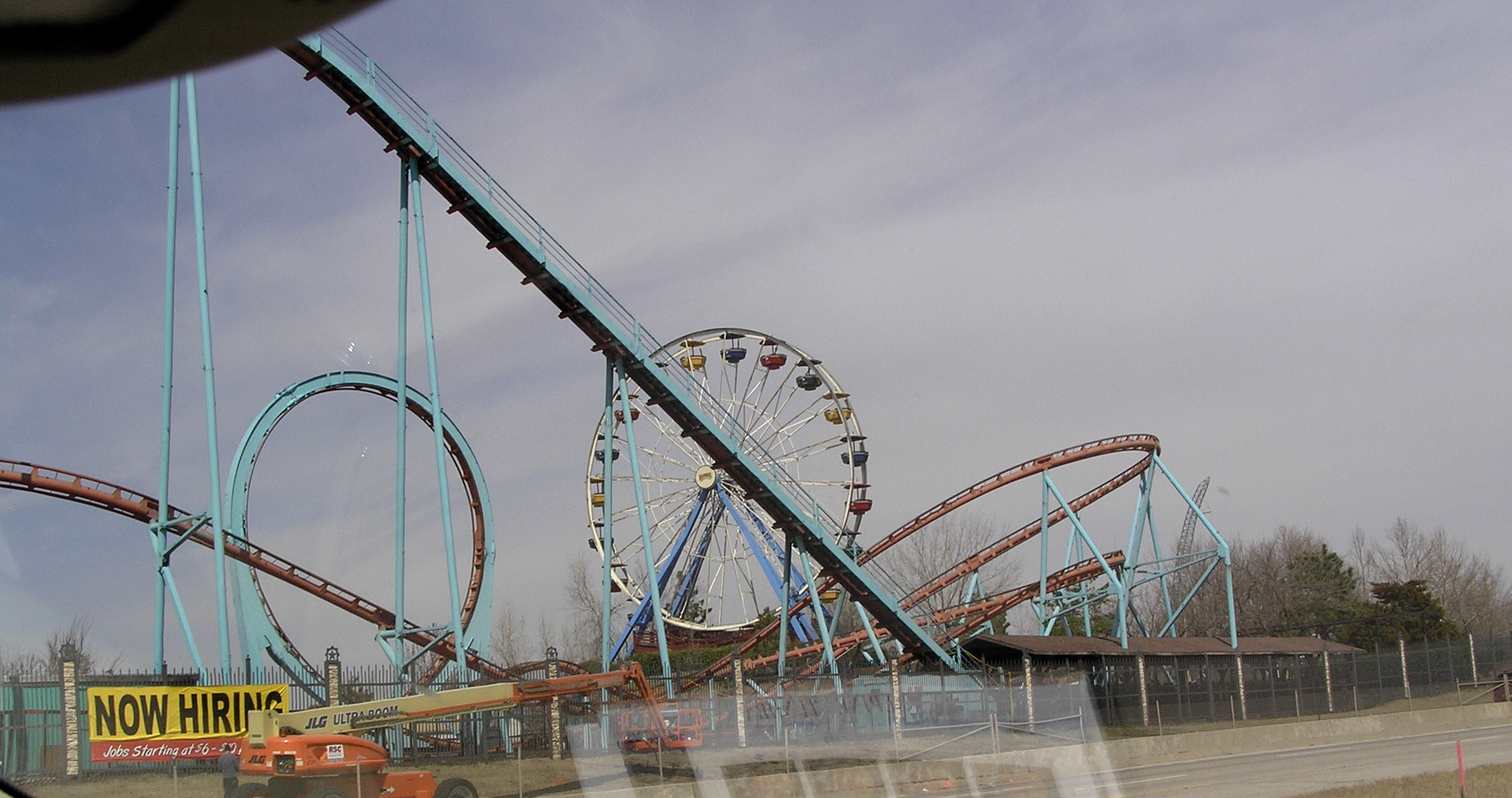
The former color scheme.

After leaving the station, riders instantly start climbing the lift hill. The first drop curves towards the right before going through the vertical loop, which is the only inversion on the ride. After the loop, riders go through a right over-banked turn before going down a small drop followed by a smaller left over-banked turn. After going through another small drop, the ride does a banked turn to the left before dropping once more and going through a right banked turn through a tunnel. After the tunnel, riders are stopped on the brake run and are then let back into the station.

The train on Silver Bullet uses a single lap bar to hold riders in the seat. This design works because the forces from the loop and helices press riders in their seats, and are a common feature with Schwarzkopf looping coasters. In 2017, seat belts were installed in addition to the lap bars.
