= Ultra Twister (Nagashima Spa Land) =

Roller coaster at Nagashima Spa Land

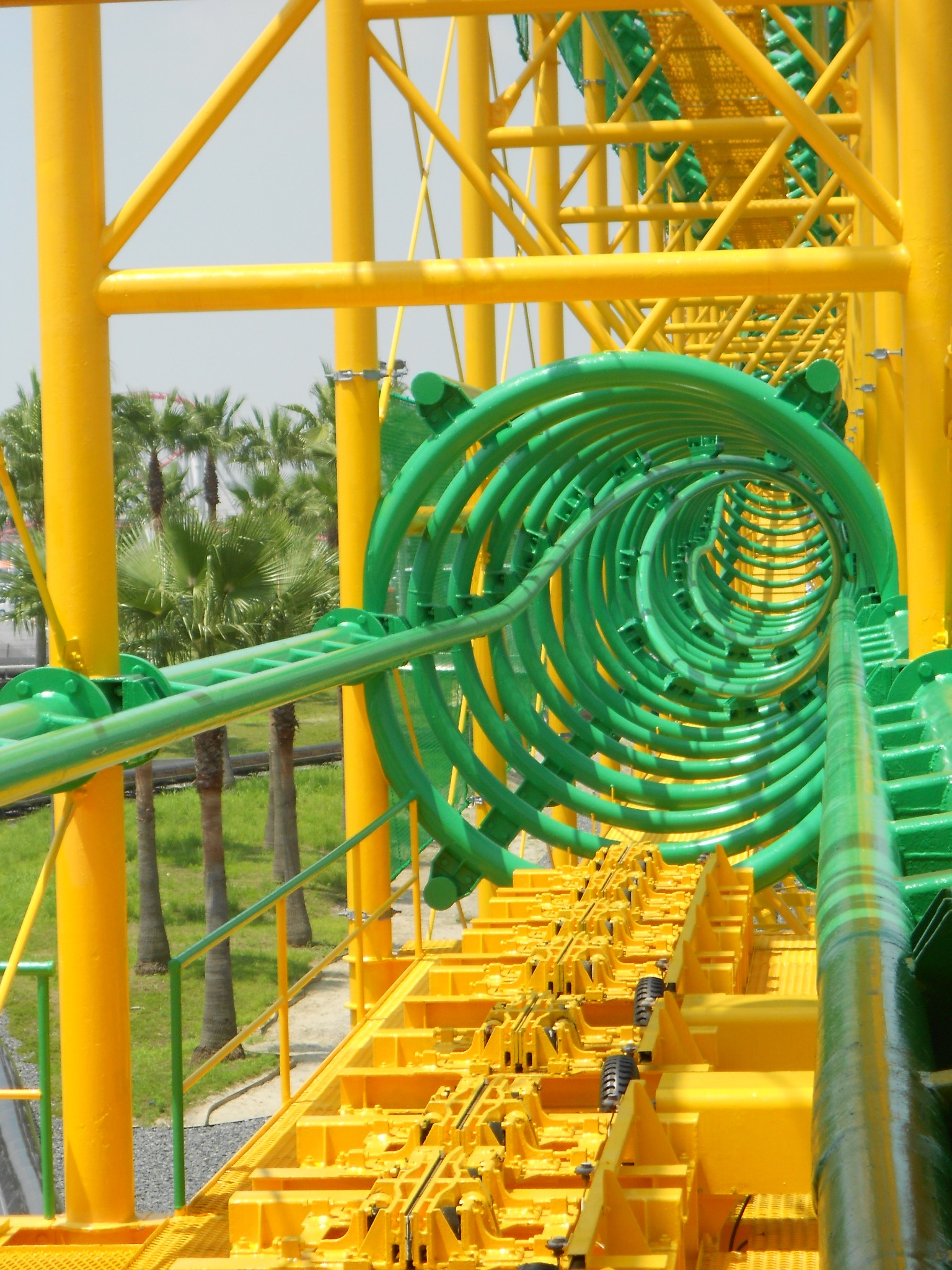
- Final inversion on Ultra Twister

Nagashima Spa Land
- Location: Nagashima Spa Land
- Coordinates: 35.028490°N 136.732587°E
- Status: Operating
- Opening date: 1989; 36 years ago

General statistics
- Type: Steel – Pipeline
- Manufacturer: TOGO
- Model: Ultra Twister
- Lift/launch system: Vertical Chain lift
- Inversions: 3
- Duration: 1:18
- Max vertical angle: 85°
- Height restriction: 122 cm (4 ft 0 in)
- Ultra Twister at RCDB

Ultra Twister (ウルトラツイスター) is a pipeline roller coaster located at Nagashima Spa Land in Mie Prefecture, Japan. Built by TOGO, the ride opened to the public in 1989. It was moved from its original location in 1989 to a new location in 2011, which sits further north inside the same park. It is also one of the few Ultratwister models from TOGO still in operation.

The loading process for this coaster involves ride attendants put the fiberglass shells down to lock in the harnesses of riders. The stations has a conveyor belt to allow guests access to a car. Ultra Twister has seven trains, two of which are generally in operation at any point. The other five serve as spares.

== Ride experience ==
The car goes slowly through the station, loads riders, and then flips the car straight up, into the lift hill, which is partially very slow, but soon speeds up as the car is almost at the top. As the drop, into an airtime hill, and then up into a heartline roll, a very small hill, and then a brake run, going down into two heartline rolls, and then a magnetic trim brake run allows a car to go slowly back into the station.

== Colors ==
Originally, the ride opened with a white paint job and blue cars. In 2008, Ultra Twister was repainted yellow and green, and its trains were repainted red. One blue train remained, which was kept in storage as a spare.

== Similar attractions ==
Until 2005, Ultra Twister had a sister coaster which operated at the defunct Six Flags AstroWorld. This version was identical in layout to the Japanese Ultra Twister, but its lift hill went up at a 45-degree angle instead of at a 90-degree angle.
