= Olympia Looping =

Amusement ride

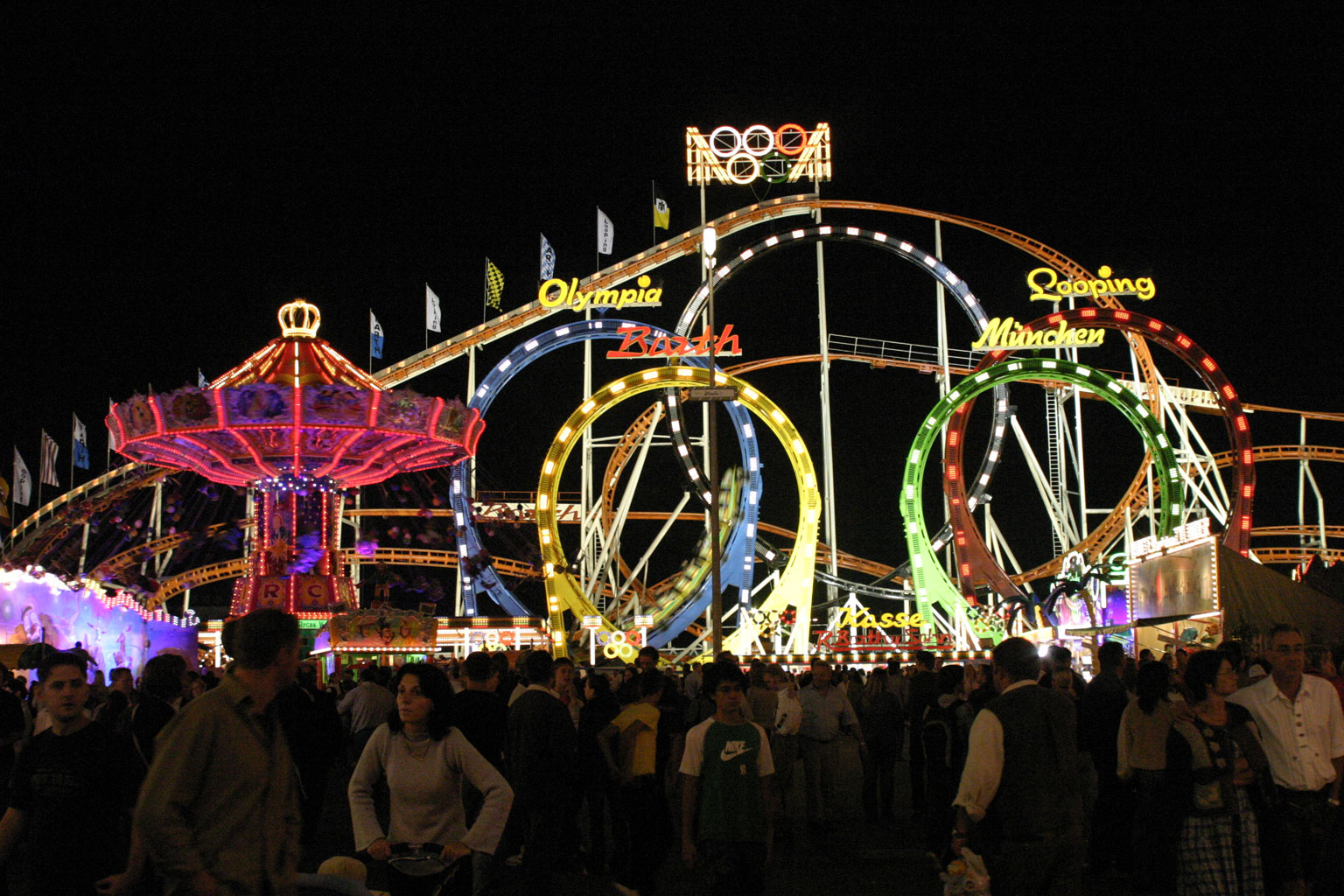
- Full layout at night

Oktoberfest
- Location: Oktoberfest
- Coordinates: 48.131°N 11.549°E
- Status: Operating
- Opening date: September 17, 1989

General statistics
- Type: Steel
- Manufacturer: BHS
- Designer: Anton Schwarzkopf, Werner Stengel
- Lift/launch system: Drive tire lift hill
- Height: 34 m (112 ft)
- Drop: 30 m (98 ft)
- Length: 1,250 m (4,100 ft)
- Speed: 84 km/h (52 mph)
- Inversions: 5
- Duration: 1:45
- Max vertical angle: 52°
- G-force: 5.2
- Height restriction: 130–195 cm (4 ft 3 in – 6 ft 5 in)
- Trains: 5 trains with 7 cars; riders arranged 2 across in 2 rows for a total of 28 riders per train
- Olympia Looping at RCDB

Olympia Looping, also known as Munich Looping, is a portable steel roller coaster owned and operated by R. Barth und Sohn Schaustellerbetriebe KG. The ride was designed by Anton Schwarzkopf and Werner Stengel, and built by BHS. It is the largest portable roller coaster in the world, and the only one with five inversions. It appears at many carnivals in Germany, most notably Oktoberfest, where it made its debut in 1989.

It is named for its five vertical loops, which resemble the Olympic rings. Although they are clothoid-shaped, their shape is closer to circular than the ones on most other roller coasters, so they exert unusually high g-forces on the passengers (up to 5.2 g).

The entire structure weighs 900 metric tonnes and requires a space 85 m wide by 36 m deep. The ride usually runs with five cars per train, though at events such as Oktoberfest and Winter Wonderland in Hyde Park, London, it runs with seven to increase throughput in busy periods.

In December 2024 Wiener Prater announced that the coaster will be closing down at the park on August 24, 2025 to make way for a new theatre set to open in 2027. The park have stated the 2025 season may be the final year Olympia Looping travels to Vienna.

== Name ==
The ride is almost always known as Olympia Looping in reference to its loops being painted to match those of the Olympic rings. However, there are two exceptions to this:

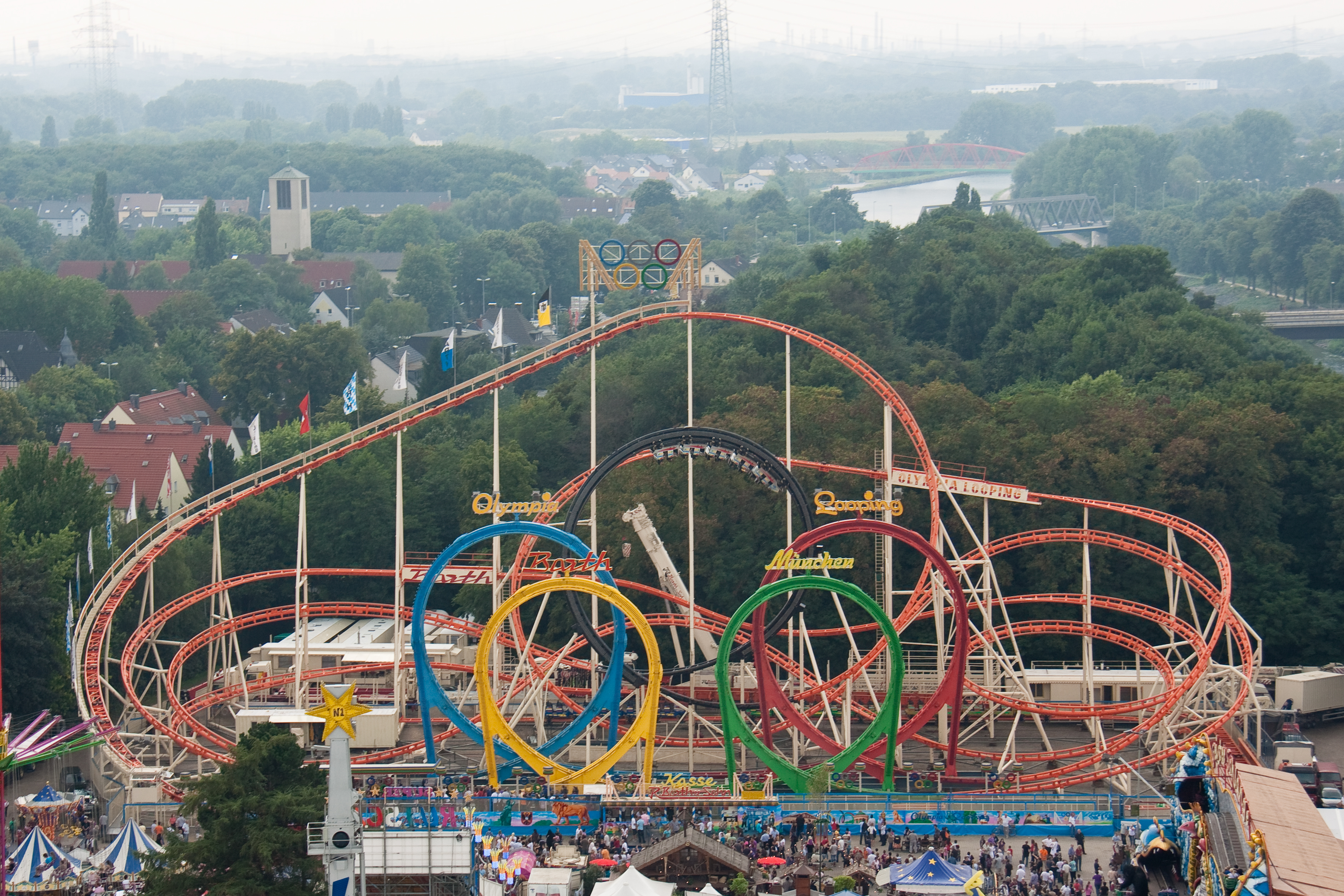
Olympia Looping's full layout

When being designed, the ride was known as Fünfer Looping (Five Loops), continuing a sequence of travelling Schwarzkopf rides that previously included Doppel Looping and Dreier Looping (Double Loop and Triple Loop). This name is occasionally used in trade literature.

Since 2016, the ride has appeared at London's Hyde Park Winter Wonderland event. In order to avoid reference to the Olympics (as the 2012 Summer Olympics was held in the city), and to fit in with the Bavarian theme of other sections of the event, the ride appears under the name Munich Looping, although branding on the ride itself uses the German München Looping.

== Ride experience ==
After leaving the station, the train starts ascending the 34 m (112 ft) lift hill. The train turns 180 degrees during the first part of the lift hill.

After cresting the top, it enters the drop. At the bottom of the drop, it immediately enters its first inversion. It then takes a sharp 180 degree turn before entering 2 back-to-back vertical loops. The train then ascends and turns 180 degrees into the mid-course brake run, which is also a small lift hill.

At the top of the lift, it drops and enters 2 half-helix elements before entering its last 2 inversions, again done back to back. Next, it enters a block brake before more full helix elements. It banks to the right where the on-ride photo is taken. After the photo is taken, the ride enters the final brakes.

== Incidents ==
On September 27, 2008, a drive tire failed on the ride, stranding over 20 Oktoberfest attendees at the top of the first hill. They were freed with the help of the Munich Fire Department.

On December 20th, 2021, whilst the Olympia Looping was stationed in Winter Wonderland, a power cut caused the ride to stop on the first hill. Riders were evacuated from the ride with the stairs on the lift hill.

On March 29th, 2022, while the Olympia Looping was stationed at the Wurstelprater in Vienna, Austria, an employee was killed in a collision with one of the trains while accessing a restricted area.

On September 16th, 2024, while Olympia Looping was being commissioned at Oktoberfest, another employee was fatally struck by a train.

== Awards ==
The ride was ranked in the Steel Roller Coasters Poll 11 Year Results Table awards from 1999 to 2010. Below is the table of the rankings of the traveling roller coaster.

Mitch Hawker's Best Roller Coaster Poll: Best Steel-Tracked Roller Coaster
Year	1999	2001	2002	2003	2004	2005	2006	2007	2008	2009	2010
Ranking	14	16	43	48	68	56	37	53	46	83	57
