= Shuttle Loop (Nagashima Spa Land) =

Roller coaster in Japan

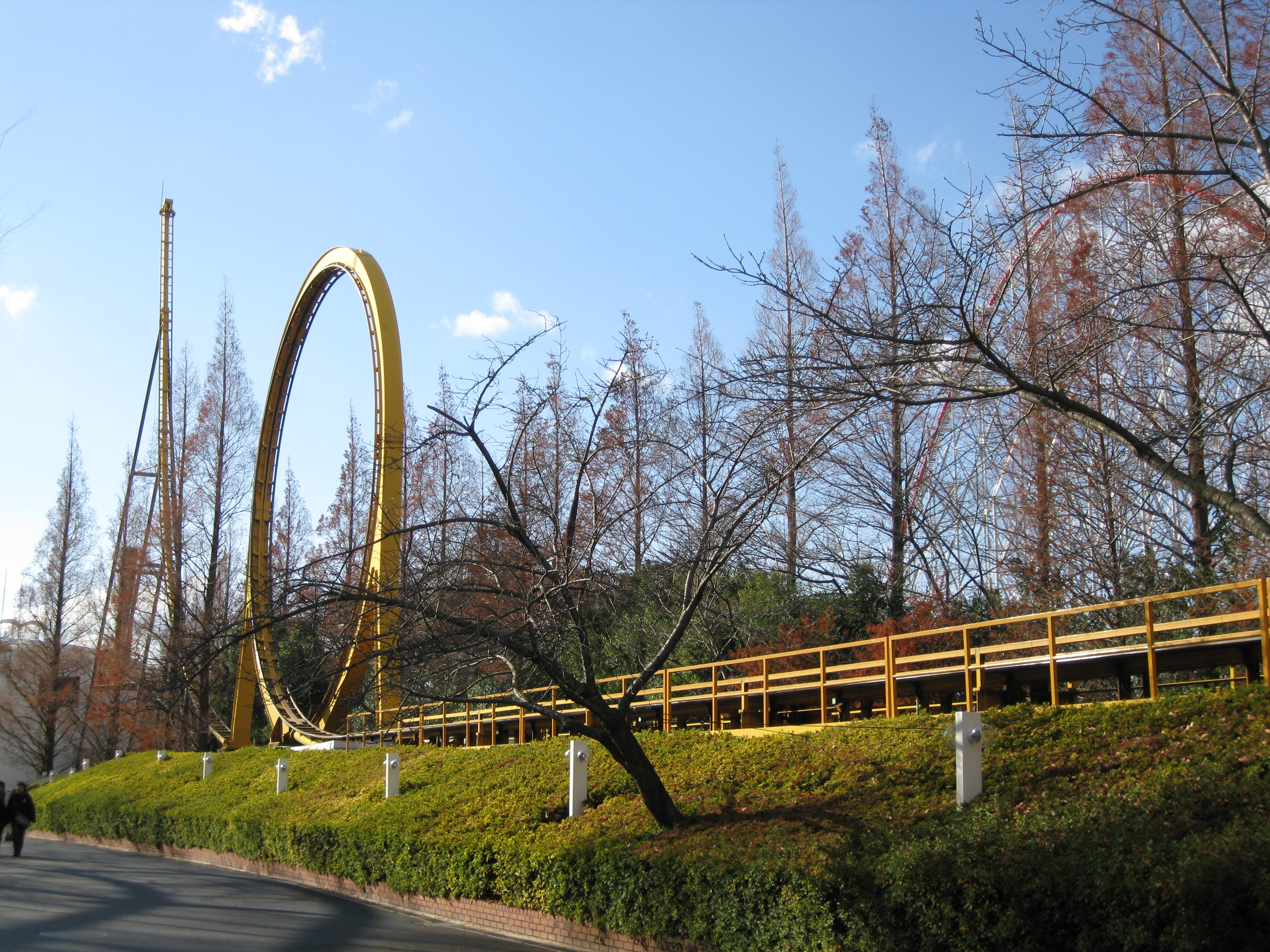
- The ride’s vertical loop

Nagashima Spa Land
- Location: Nagashima Spa Land
- Coordinates: 35.0303°N 136.7308°E
- Status: Operating
- Opening date: 1 March 1980

General statistics
- Type: Steel – Shuttle
- Manufacturer: Anton Schwarzkopf
- Designer: Werner Stengel
- Model: Shuttle Loop
- Height: 42 m (138 ft)
- Length: 263 m (863 ft)
- Speed: 91 km/h (57 mph)
- Inversions: 1 (traversed twice)
- Duration: 0:30
- Max vertical angle: 70°
- Trains: Single train with 7 cars. Riders are arranged 2 across in 2 rows for a total of 28 riders per train.
- Shuttle Loop at RCDB

Shuttle Loop (シャトルループ) is a steel launched Shuttle Loop roller coaster manufactured by Anton Schwarzkopf in Nagashima Spa Land in Japan. It opened on 1 March 1980, and is one of six Shuttle Loop roller coasters still operating in the world.

== Ride experience ==
The ride takes off and goes through a loop. It then goes up a hill, loses momentum, and goes backwards through the loop. It goes past the station to another hill. It then loses speed and goes back to the station and ends. The complete ride is about 20-30 seconds.
