= Nagashima Spa Land =

Japanese amusement park in Kuwana

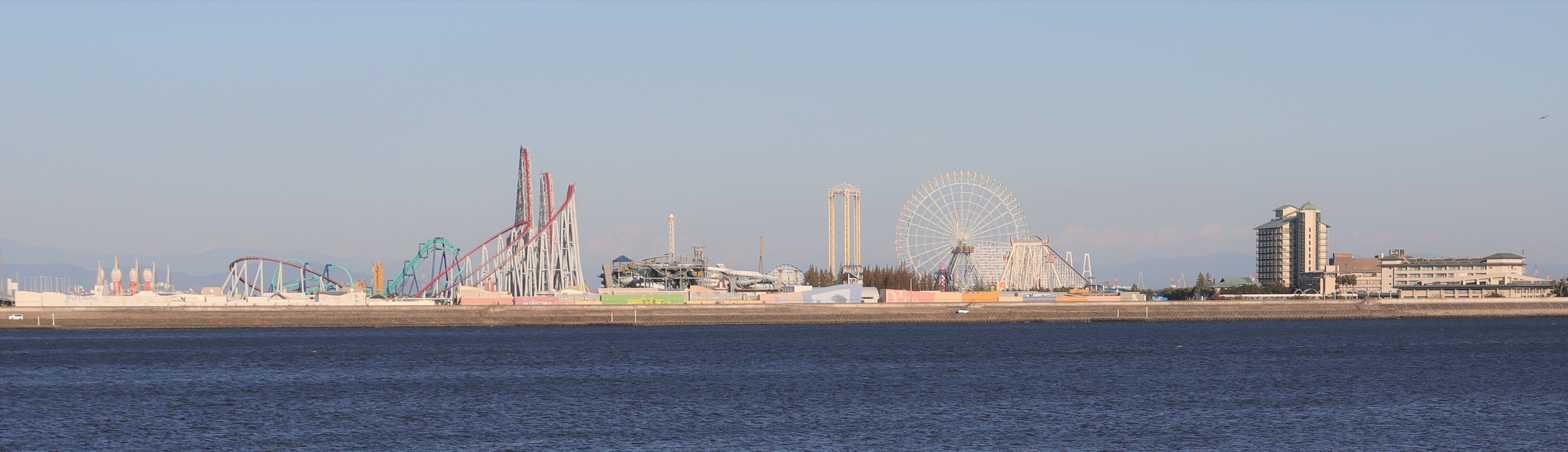
- Nagashima Spa Land in the distance
- Interactive map of Nagashima Spa Land
- Location: 333 Urayasu, Nagashima, Kuwana, Mie 511-1135 Japan
- Coordinates: 35.029698°N 136.730014°E
- Status: Operating
- Opened: 1966

Attractions
- Total: 45
- Roller coasters: 12
- Water rides: 2
- Website: www.nagashima-onsen.co.jp (in Japanese)

Nagashima Spa Land (ナガシマスパーランド, Nagashima Supā Rando) is an amusement park and vacation resort in Kuwana, Mie, Japan, about 30 km west of Nagoya. It opened in 1966, and features an amusement park with several roller coasters, thrill rides, kiddie rides, a water park (open only in the summer), a hot springs complex, an outdoor outlet mall, and 3 official hotels.

In 2022, Nagashima Spa Land hosted 4.2 million visitors, making it the 21st-most visited amusement park in the world and the fourth-most visited in Japan behind Tokyo Disneyland, Tokyo DisneySea and Universal Studios Japan that year.

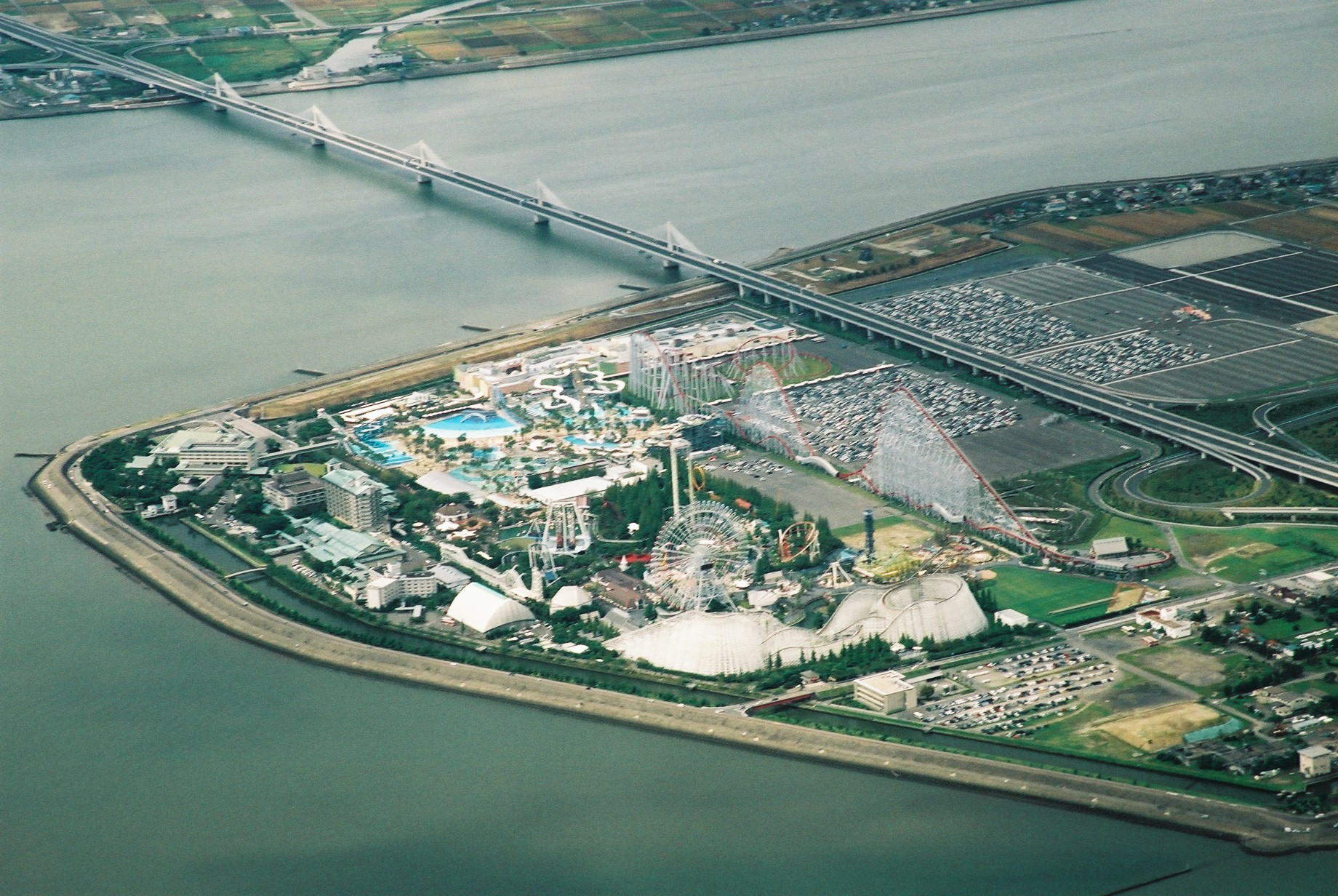
Aerial view of Nagashima Spa Land

== Rides ==
=== Roller coasters ===
Nagashima Spa Land has 12 roller coasters.

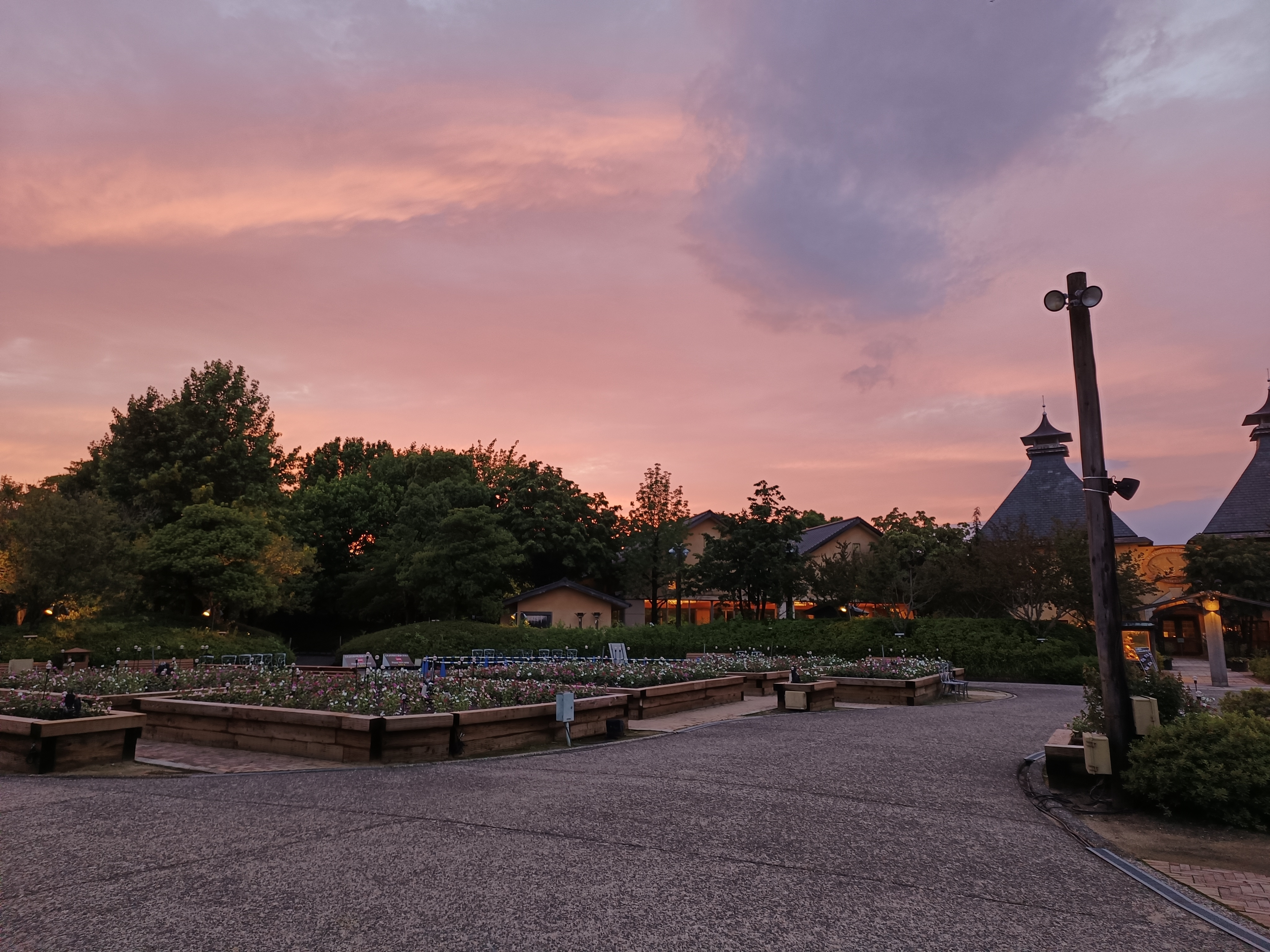
Nabana-no-Sato

Name	Year installed	Manufacturer	Description
Acrobat (アクロバット)	2015	Bolliger & Mabillard	Steel flying roller coaster
Arashi (嵐)	2017	S&S Worldwide	Steel fourth-dimension wing roller coaster
Children Coaster (チルドレンコースター)	1983	Zierer	Steel family roller coaster
Corkscrew (コークスクリュー)	2012	Arrow Dynamics	Steel roller coaster
Hakugei (白鯨)	2019	Rocky Mountain Construction	Hybrid steel roller coaster; conversion of the former White Cyclone (ホワイトサイクロン) wooden coaster
Jet Coaster (ジェットコースター)	1966	Togo	Steel mine train roller coaster
Looping Star (ルーピングスター)	1982	Schwarzkopf	Steel roller coaster
Peter Rabbit Coaster (ピーターラビットコースター)	2012	Hoei Sangyo Co	Steel family roller coaster
Shuttle Loop (シャトルループ)	1980	Schwarzkopf	Launched steel shuttle roller coaster
Steel Dragon 2000 (スチールドラゴン2000)	2000	D.H. Morgan Manufacturing	Steel giga roller coaster
Ultra Twister (ウルトラツイスター)	2012	Togo	Steel pipeline roller coaster
Wild Mouse (ワイルドマウス)	1996	Mack Rides	Two steel wild mouse roller coasters built next to each other with mirrored layouts

=== Ferris wheel ===
Nagashima Spa Land is the home of Aurora Wheel, a giant Ferris wheel. It is 90 metres (295 ft) tall and 83 metres (272 ft) in diameter.

== Other attractions ==
=== Nabana-no-Sato ===
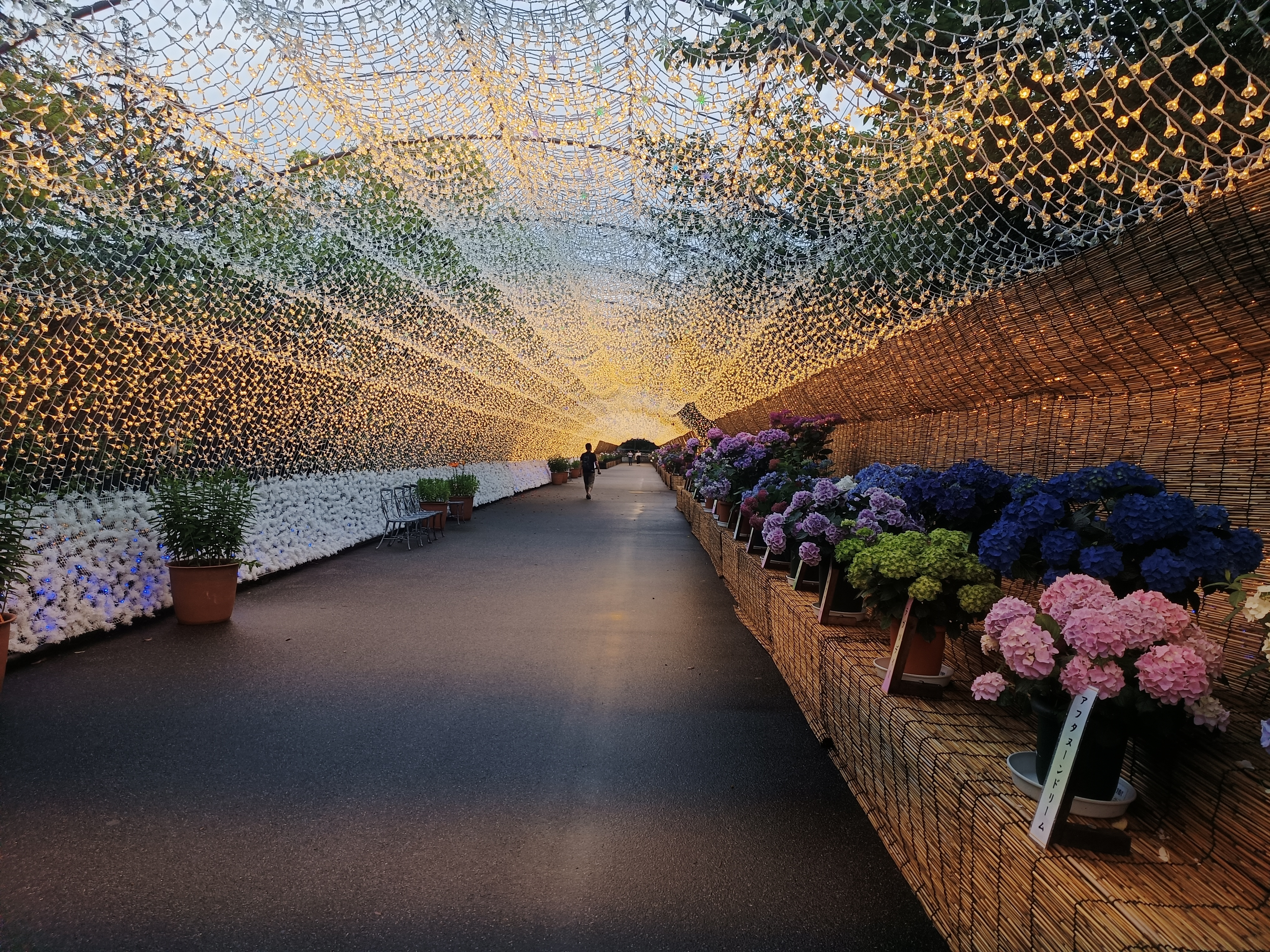
The Tunnel of Light

Nabana-no-Sato is a botanical garden known for its seasonal flower and light shows. It covers an area of roughly 230,000 square meters and is filled with over 12,000 species of flowers. During the spring, tulips and dahlias bloom throughout it. The illumination park, which features more than 8 million LEDs, is open from mid-October to early May.

Attractions within the garden include the Tunnel Of Light (the largest illuminated flower garden in Japan), the Begonia Garden, the Nagashima Beer Garden, the Santono-yu Spa, and the Island Fuji Observation Platform.

=== Yuami-no-Shima ===
Yuami-no-Shima is a hot spring (onsen) theme park located at Nagashima Spa Land. It is the largest theme park of its kind in Japan.

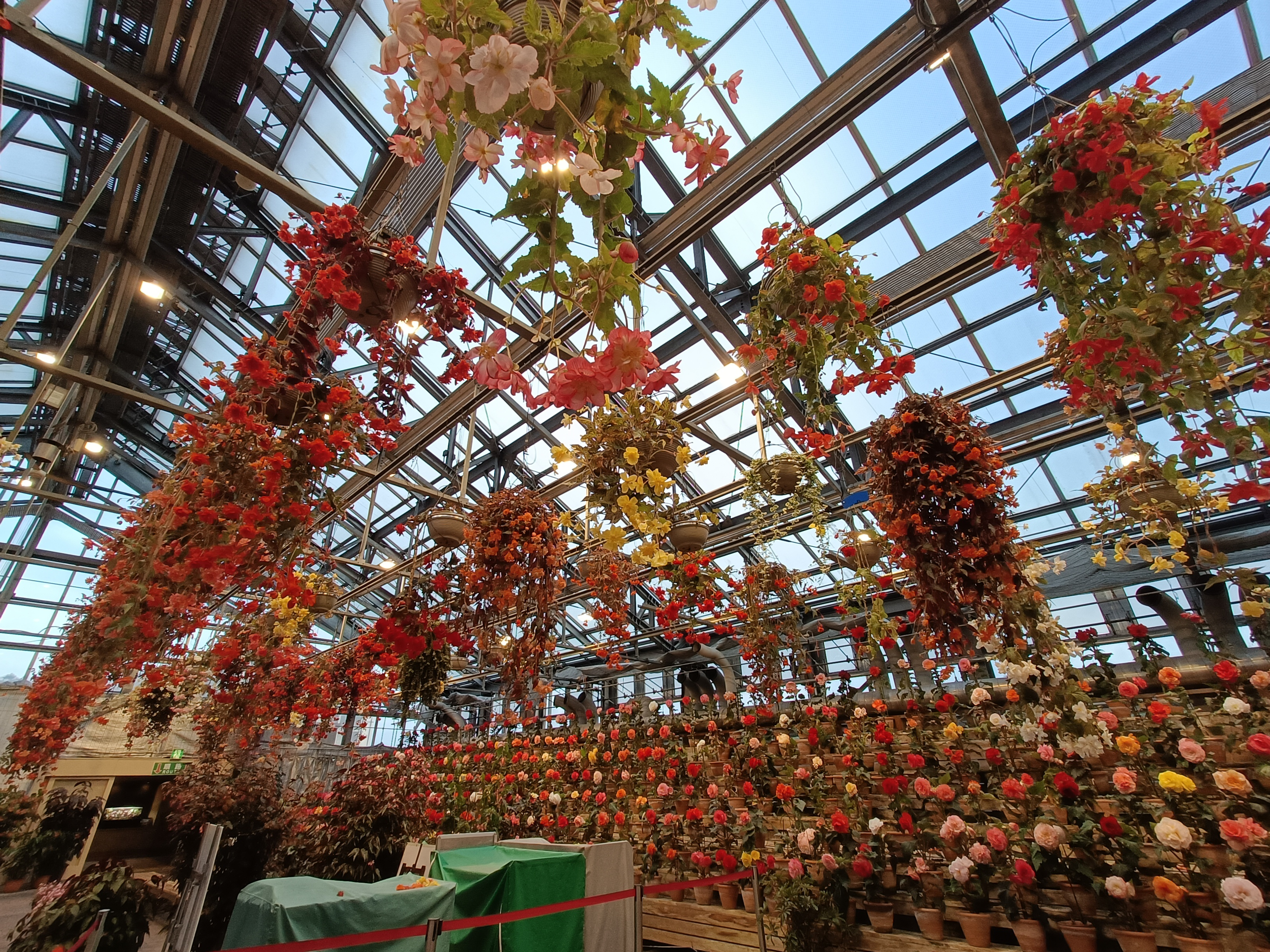
Begonia Garden

== Incident ==
On 19 October 2003, one of Steel Dragon 2000's trains lost a wheel, which hit a guest in the water park, leaving the guest with a broken hip. The ride was closed for three years until sturdier wheels were installed, and it reopened in 2006.
