= Anton Schwarzkopf =

German engineer of amusement rides

- Born: 8 July 1924; Bahlingen, Weimar Republic
- Died: 30 July 2001 (aged 77); Germany
- Occupations: Founder and president, Schwarzkopf Industries GmbH
- Years active: 1957–1995
- Known for: roller coaster designer
- Notable work: Revolution, Shockwave, The Mindbender, Olympia Looping, Whizzer, Shuttle Loop

Anton Schwarzkopf (8 July 1924 – 30 July 2001) was a German engineer who founded Schwarzkopf Industries GmbH, a German manufacturer of roller coasters and other amusement rides that were sold to amusement parks and travelling funfairs around the world.

== Early years ==
Anton Schwarzkopf, born 8 July 1924 in Bahlingen, Germany, began as an apprentice in his father's business, which focused on the design of specialised trailers used to transport circus equipment. By 1954, his father's company had transitioned into creating amusement rides.

== Career ==
In 1957, Schwarzkopf built his first attraction, the Düsenspirale, which was a roller coaster that traveled around Germany with funfair showman Löffelhardt. He took over his father's company in 1960 and created his first full-scale steel roller coaster, The Wildcat, in 1964. In 1970, the first Jet Star II model was built for German showman Rick. The model became popular for its electric spiral lift hill, and many of this type were built. In 1976, Schwarzkopf partnered with ride engineer Werner Stengel to create a ground-breaking attraction, the Revolution roller coaster at Six Flags Magic Mountain in California. It was the first roller coaster in the modern era to feature a vertical loop. The vertical loop became a signature element used in many of Schwarzkopf's designs, including King Kobra at Kings Dominion in 1977, one of the first Shuttle Loop designs, and Shock Wave at Six Flags Over Texas in 1978, which featured consecutive vertical loops.

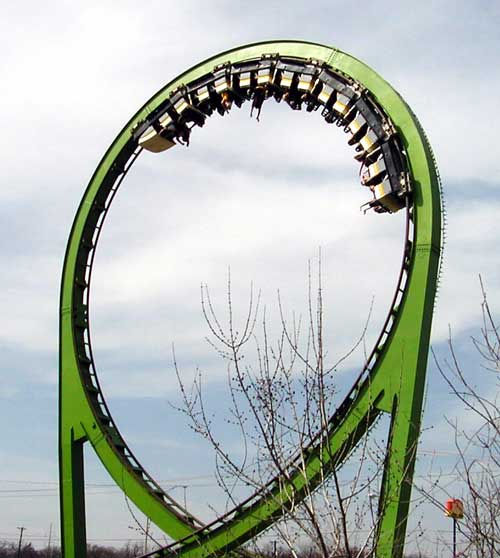
'Shockwave', Schwarzkopf's first double loop roller coaster.

Schwarzkopf Industries GmbH experienced rapid growth throughout the 1970s, as its rides were well received and in high demand. In the 1980s, the company produced several transportable rides for travelling funfairs, particularly those in Western Europe, with a notable example being the Alpina Bahn in 1983. Dreier Looping (meaning triple loop in English) was built in 1984, and Thriller was built in 1986. Outside of Germany, the company partnered with Intamin, and many older rides credited to Intamin were actually designed and created by Schwarzkopf. Schwarzkopf suffered several business setbacks and suffered through several bankruptcies, with the first occurring in late 1983, leading to the abandonment of several upcoming designs and installations. While dormant during the mid-1980s, Peißenberg and Zierer stepped in to construct several of Schwarzkopf's designs, including Bavarian Mountain Railroad in 1987.

The company continued to produce flat rides and assist with roller coaster design for a number of years, and some popular releases during this time included the Bayern Kurve, the Enterprise, and the Monster. Schwarzkopf retired from the industry in 1995 and died on 30 July 2001 (aged 77) after battling Parkinson's disease for several years.

== Legacy ==
There are a number of notable people from the amusement industry who have either worked with, or have relations to Anton Schwarzkopf. His brother, Franz Schwarzkopf, was also a ride designer around the same time as Anton, and designed many staples of both amusement parks and carnivals alike, such as the Wave Swinger. Anton's son Wieland Schwarzkopf also became involved with the industry, starting out at Schwarzkopf, and later starting his own business in 1984. Wieland's company mostly provided parts and services for his father's rides, but had a few of its own attractions, such as the 'Sound Factory', a short-lived version of the popular 'Monster' ride with looping cars. Werner Stengel got his start with the Schwarzkopf company, and later went on to become one of the most prestigious designers of roller coasters and amusement rides. He was still heavily involved with most of Schwarzkopf's attractions. Hubert Gerstlauer, founder and namesake of Gerstlauer Amusement Rides GmbH, was an employee of Schwarzkopf, before starting his own company in 1982. Gerstlauer's manufacturing is still carried out at the former Schwarzkopf facility in Münsterhausen, Bavaria.

Despite their age and shrinking numbers, Schwarzkopf rides remain popular. New Revolution at Six Flags Magic Mountain, Whizzer at Six Flags Great America, and Montezooma's Revenge at Knott's Berry Farm have all received the American Coaster Enthusiasts (ACE) Coaster Landmark award signifying their importance to the industry.

== List of notable roller coasters ==
As of 2019, Schwarzkopf has built 149 roller coasters around the world.

List of roller coasters from Anton Schwarzkopf
Name	Model	Amusement park former park(s)	Country	Year built	Status	refs
Greased Lightnin' formerly Tidal Wave	Shuttle Loop	Six Flags Discovery Kingdom; California's Great America	United States	unknown 1977–2002	Removed	
Düsenspirale	Unknown	Wiener Prater	Austria	1957	Removed	
Jet Star	Jet Star	Casino Pier	United States	1970	Removed	
Jumbo Jet	Jet Star 3 / Jumbo Jet	Six Flags Great Adventure	United States	1975	Removed	
Whizzer formerly Willard's Whizzer	Speed Racer / Extended Jumbo Jet	Six Flags Great America	United States	1976	Operating	
Whizzer formerly Willard's Whizzer	Speed Racer / Extended Jumbo Jet	California's Great America	United States	1976	Removed	
Jet Star 2	Jet Star 2	Lagoon; Riverfront Park	United States	1976; 1974	Removed	
Alpen Blitz	Alpenblitz II	Six Flags Great Adventure	United States	1976	Removed	
Jumbo Jet	Jet Star 3 / Jumbo Jet	Morey's Piers	United States	1976	Removed	
New Revolution	Unknown	Six Flags Magic Mountain	United States	1976	Operating	
SooperDooperLooper	Looping Speedracer	Hersheypark	United States	1977	Operating	
Wild Rider	Wildcat 54m	Six Flags Great Adventure	United States	1978	Removed	
The Riddler Mindbender	Unknown	Six Flags Over Georgia	United States	1978	Operating	
Shock Wave	Unknown	Six Flags Over Texas	United States	1978	Operating	
Montezooma's Revenge	Shuttle Loop	Knott's Berry Farm	United States	1978	Closed for renovations	
Wildcat	Wildcat 65m	Cedar Point	United States	1979	Removed	
Shuttle Loop	Shuttle Loop	Nagashima Spa Land	Japan	1980	Operating	
Nessie	Looping Racer	Hansa Park	Germany	1980	Operating	
Scorpion	Silverarrow	Busch Gardens Tampa	United States	1980	Removed	
Looping Star	Looping Star	Nagashima Spa Land	Japan	1982	Operating	
Turbine formerly Sirocco formerly Turbine (1st); Formerly Psyké Underground	Shuttle Loop	Walibi Belgium	Belgium	1982	Operating	
Colossus the Fire Dragon	Double Looping	Lagoon	United States	1983	Operating	
Tig'rr Coaster formerly Jet Star	Jet Star	Indiana Beach; Holiday Beach	United States	1984; 1976–1983	Operating	
Mindbender	Dreier Looping	Galaxyland Amusement Park	Canada	1985	Removed	
Silver Bullet	Looping Star	Frontier City	United States	1986	Operating	
Lisebergbanan	Unknown	Liseberg	Sweden	1987	Operating	
Jetline formerly Berg- och Dalbanan	Unknown	Gröna Lund	Sweden	1988-2023	Closed	
Viper formerly Jet Scream	Looping Star	Six Flags AstroWorld; Six Flags St. Louis	United States	1989; 1981–1988	Removed	
Golden Loop formerly White Lightnin'	Shuttle Loop	Gold Reef City; Carowinds	South Africa	1989; 1977–1988	Operating	
Turbo Mountain formerly Geronimo	Jet Star 2	Adventure World; Luna Park	Australia	1991; 1982–1988	Removed	
Cannonball Express formerly Enigma formerly Super Figure Eight formerly Jumbo 5	Jumbo V	Pleasurewood Hills; Funland Park; Meli Park	United Kingdom	1995; 1985–1995; 1983–1984	Operating	
Nightmare at Crack Axle Canyon formerly Nightmare at Phantom Cave formerly Starchaser	Jet Star	Great Escape; Six Flags Darien Lake; Kentucky Kingdom; Beech Bend	United States	1999; 1996–1998; 1987–1995 unknown	Removed	
Katapul formerly Thunderlooper formerly King Kobra	Shuttle Loop	Hopi Hari; Alton Towers; Jolly Roger Amusement Park; Kings Dominion	Brazil	1999; 1990–1996; 1987–1989; 1977–1986	Operating	
Montaña Rusa formerly Zambezi Zinger	Speed Racer / Extended Jumbo Jet	Parque Del Café; Worlds of Fun	Colombia	1999; 1973–1997	Operating	
Jet Star	Jet Star	Luna Park La Palmyre; Morey's Piers; Knoebels Amusement Park & Resort	France	2000; 1993–1999; 1977–1992	Operating	
Tornado formerly Glissade	Jet Star 3 / Jumbo Jet	Selva Mágica; La Feria Chapultepec Magico; Busch Gardens Williamsburg	Mexico	2002; 1993–2001; 1975–1985	Closed	
Knightmare formerly BMRX formerly Bavarian Mountain Railroad	Unknown	Camelot Theme Park; Kobe Portopialand	United Kingdom	2007; 1987–2006	Removed	
Tsunami formerly Zonga formerly Texas Tornado formerly Taz's Texas Tornado formerly Thriller	Unknown	Isla San Marcos Parque Temático; Six Flags Discovery Kingdom; Six Flags AstroWorld; Gröna Lund	Mexico	2008; 2003–2004; 1998–2000; 1996	Removed	
Tornado formerly Space Mountain formerly New Beast formerly Alton Beast	Jet Star 3 / Jumbo Jet	Salitre Magico; Divertido; Alton Towers	Colombia	2010; 1998–2004; 1992–1997	Removed	
Rocket formerly Black Hole formerly Black Hole II formerly New Black Hole	Jet Star 2	Furuvik; Alton Towers	Sweden	2011; 1983–2005	Removed	
Jumbo Jet	Jet Star 3 / Jumbo Jet	Chelyuskintsev Park; Dreamland; Beoland; Malmö Folkets Park; Palace Playland; Cedar Point	Belarus	2015; 2010–2014; 2003–2006; 1985–1989 unknown 1972–1978	Operating	
Wildcat formerly Rails formerly Wild Rails	Wildcat 65m	Jolly Roger Amusement Park; Valleyfair; Cedar Point	United States	2015; 1999–2001; 1979–1998; 1970–1978	Operating	&
Big Blue formerly Twist and Shout formerly Looping Star formerly Tower of Terror; Silberpfeil	Silverarrow	Fun Park Mirnovec; Loudoun Castle; Dreamland; Camelot Theme Park; Ocean Beach Amusement Park; OK Corral	Croatia	2017; 2003–2010; 2001–2002; 1989–2000; 1986–1988; 1980–1985	Operating	
Bobsleigh formerly Course De Bobsleigh formerly Jumbo Jet	City Jet / Jet 400	Parc de la Vallée; Nigloland; Drayton Manor	France	2018; 1995–2017; 1981–1983	Operating	
Looping Star formerly Thunder Loop formerly Looping Star formerly Superachtbaan Looping Star	Looping Star	Parko Paliatso Luna Park; Attractiepark Slagharen	Cyprus	2018-2023; 1979–2016	Removed	
Teststrecke formerly Laser formerly Colossus	Double Looping	Meyer & Rosenzweig; Wiener Prater; Dorney Park; Playcenter São Paulo	Austria	2019 (Wiener Prater); 1986–2008; 1981–1986	Operating	
Super Jet formerly Montanha Russa	Wildcat 54m	Diego's Park; Mirabilandia	Brazil	2019/20; 1994–1998	Operating	
Texas Wildcat formerly Raptor Attack formerly Rat Ride	Wildcat 45m	COTALAND; Lightwater Valley	United Kingdom	2021; 1987–2019	Operating	
Olympia Looping	Unknown	Wiener Prater	Austria	2022; 2018; 2016	Operating	
All American Triple Loop formerly Quimera formerly Montaña Triple Loop formerly Montaña Infinitum formerly Magnum Force formerly Triple Loop Coaster	Unknown	Indiana Beach; La Feria Chapultepec Magico; Flamingo Land; Sunway Lagoon	United States	2024; 2007–2019; 2000–2005; 1997–1999	Operating	&
Unknown formerly Cascabel formerly Laser Loop	Shuttle Loop	Indiana Beach; Niagara Amusement Park & Splash World; La Feria Chapultepec Magico; Kennywood	United States	TBA; 1994–2019; 1980–1990	In; Storage	

== List of other attractions ==
- Giant wheel – a 41.5 metres (136 feet) diameter Ferris wheel at Six Flags Great Adventure and Cedar Point.
- Orbit (Enterprise) – Six Flags Great America, formerly the Orleans Orbit upon opening of Marriott's Great America, operated from 1976 to 2016.
- Orbit (Enterprise) – California's Great America.
- Wheelie (Enterprise) – Six Flags Over Georgia, operated from 1977 to 2012, removed to make room for SkyScreamer. Now at Funspot in Orlando.
- Enterprise – Attractiepark Slagharren.
- Bayern Kurve – Kennywood.
- Berserker (Bayern Kurve) – California's Great America.
- Centrifuge (Calypso III) – California's Great America.
- Fiddler's Fling (Calypso III) – Six Flags Great America.
- The Lobster (Monster III) – Six Flags Great America.
- A Shuttle Boat ride (Santa Maria) at Bobbejaanland, defunct.
- Apollo (Apollo 14) – Attractiepark Slagharen, one of two originally built at the park, both were converted to swing rides at some point, and one of the sides ended up at Loudoun Castle.
- El Torito (de Octupus 1973-2016) (Monster II) – Attractiepark Slagharren.
- Sky Tower (Zeppelin II) – ,Attractiepark Slagharren. later converted into an observation tower.
- Monorail – Attractiepark Slagharren.
- Reuzenrad- Attractiepark Slagharren.
- monorail- Bobbejaanland
- Riesenrad (Ferris Wheel 50m) – famous Oktoberfest ferris wheel, owned by showman Willenborg.

The Sound Factory, a portable fair ride created sometime between 1998 and 1999, was retired in the early 2000s with hardly any video or photos of it. It returned sometime between 2017–2018 as "The Parkour". The ride was modified with modern seats and no longer flips upside-down. As of September 2024 it is still in operation and can be found at fairs outside of the US.
