= Pipeline roller coaster =

Roller coaster design

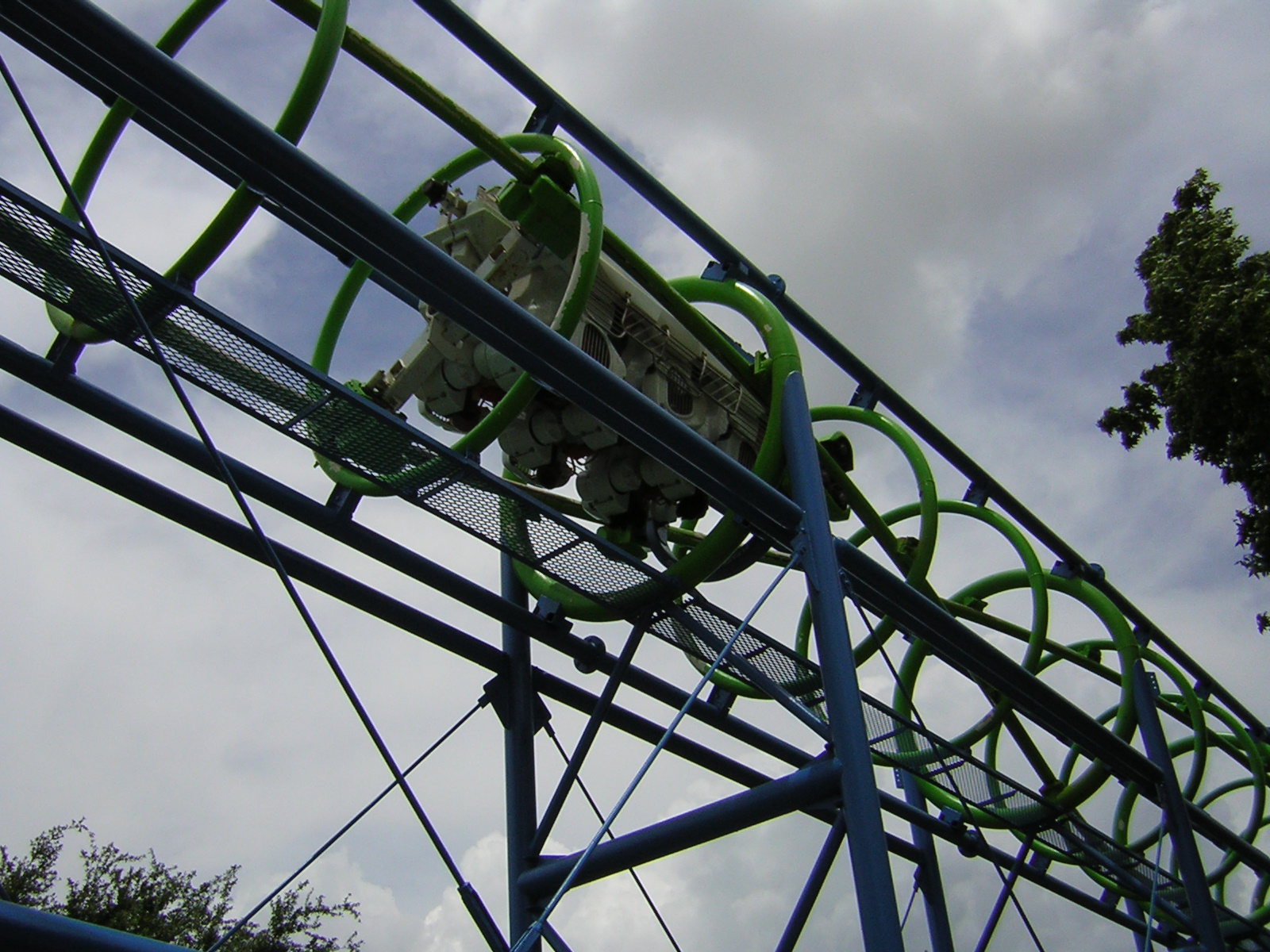
- Ultra Twister at the defunct Six Flags Astroworld, a TOGO pipeline coaster
- Status: Discontinued
- First manufactured: 1984
- No. of installations: 12
- Manufacturers: TOGO; Arrow Dynamics; Intamin
- Riders per row: 2
- Restraint Style: Over-the-Shoulder

A pipeline roller coaster is a type of roller coaster where the trains ride between the tracks as opposed to a traditional roller coaster where they ride above them. The concept was first developed by Japanese ride company TOGO as the Ultratwister model. They built six installations of the design, four of which are still in existence. Arrow Dynamics created an alternate version of the concept, but it never made it past the prototype stage in development. Intamin developed a version known as the Spiral Coaster model, building only one installation, which is no longer in operation.

== History ==
The first pipeline coasters were manufactured by TOGO as their Ultratwister model. The company manufactured six of the model, with the first two opening in 1986 at Tokyo Dome City in Tokyo, Japan, and Six Flags Great Adventure in Jackson, New Jersey, United States, both named "Ultra Twister."

TOGO's Ultratwister model features an 85-degree lift hill followed by three heartline roll inversions. Between the second and third rolls is a switch track that tilts trains to an approximately 45 degree angle, sending them through the remainder of the course backwards. The Ultratwister at Rusutsu Resort is the only S-II model built by TOGO, featuring a dive loop instead of a switch track.

Arrow Dynamics attempted to develop a pipeline roller coaster, building a prototype at Arrow's facility in Utah. In 1990, John Wardley worked with Alton Towers to attempt to build one at the park. This was later scrapped in favor of Nemesis after Wardley rode the prototype and disliked the experience it offered.

In the 1996, Intamin built Sky Plaza Comet, a Spiral Coaster at Sky Plaza in South Korea. In 2000, the coaster was relocated to Al-Sha'ab Leisure Park in Kuwait (now known as Winter Wonderland Kuwait), before permanently closing in 2005. The ride remained standing but not operating until its removal in 2017.

== Installations ==
Coaster name	Amusement park	Manufacturer	Model	Opened	Status
Ultra Twister	Tokyo Dome City	TOGO	Ultratwister	1986	Demolished
Ultra Twister	Nagashima Spa Land	TOGO	Ultratwister	1989	Operating
Ultra Twister	Rusutsu Resort; World Food Festival	TOGO	Ultratwister S-II	1989; 1988	Operating; Closed 1988
Ultra Twister	Brazilian Park Washuzan Highland	TOGO	Ultratwister	1991	Operating
Ultra Twister Megaton	Greenland	TOGO	Ultratwister	1994	Demolished; Closed 2020
Spiral Coaster; Formerly Sky Plaza Comet	Winter Wonderland Kuwait; Sky Plaza	Intamin	Spiral Coaster	2000; 1996	Demolished; Closed 1999
Ultra Coaster; Formerly Ultra Twister	South Sabahiya Park; Ikoma Skyland	TOGO	Ultratwister	2008; 2004 or earlier	Demolished; Closed 2012
unknown Formerly Ultra Twister; Formerly Ultra Twister	Six Flags America; Six Flags AstroWorld; Six Flags Great Adventure	TOGO	Ultratwister	2006; 1990; 1986	Removed; in storage 2005; 1988
