= Shuttle Loop =

Roller coaster model

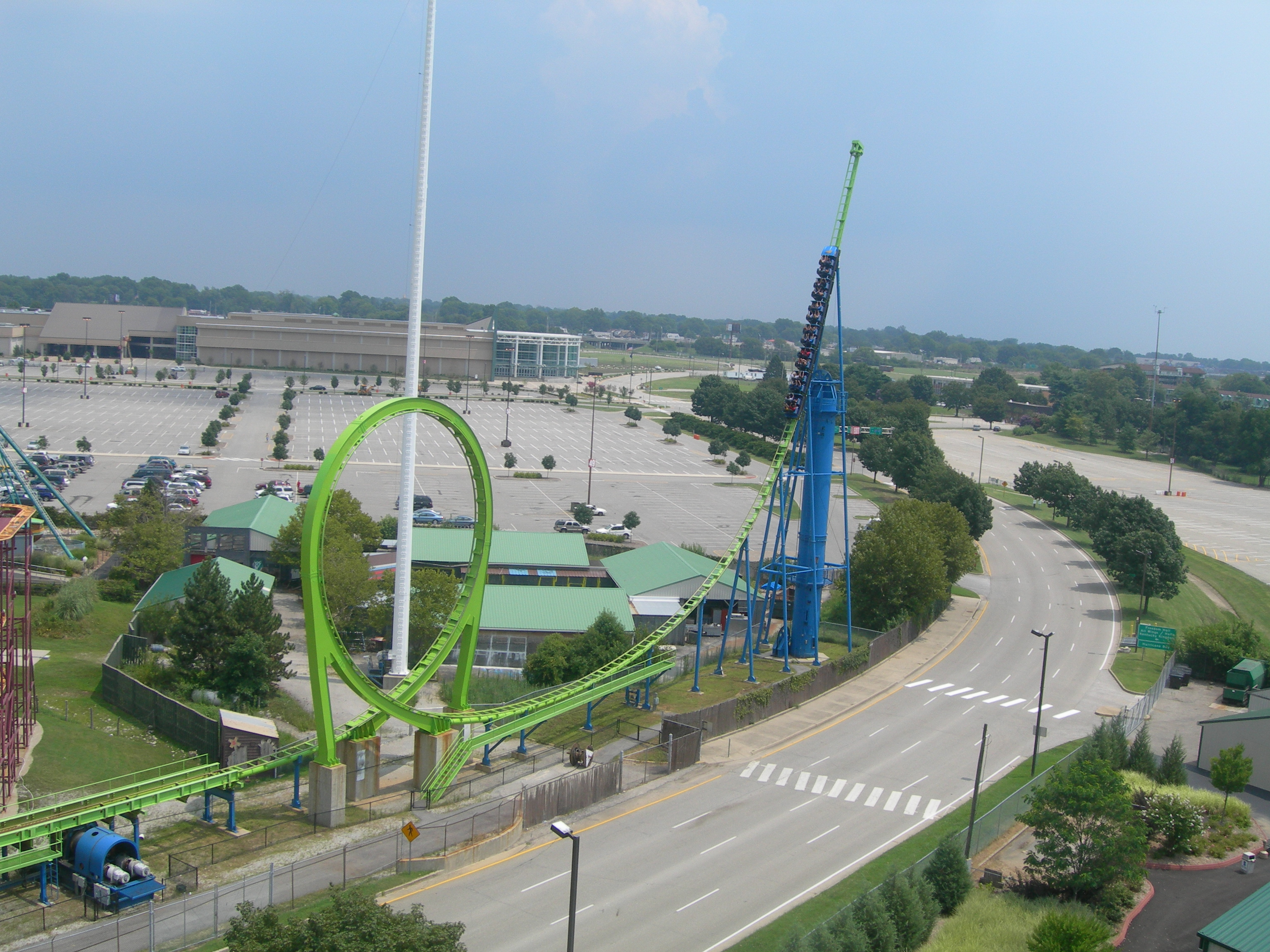
- Kentucky Kingdom's Greezed Lightnin' before it closed in 2009
- Status: Discontinued
- First manufactured: 1977
- No. of installations: 12
- Manufacturer: Anton Schwarzkopf
- Designer: Werner Stengel & Reinhold Spieldiener
- Capacity: 1,300 riders per hour
- Vehicle type: Roller coaster train
- Vehicles: 1
- Riders per vehicle: 28
- Rows: 14
- Riders per row: 2
- Inversions: 1 (traversed 2 times, forward and backward)
- Shuttle Loop at RCDB

Shuttle Loop is a type of steel launched shuttle roller coaster designed by Reinhold Spieldiener of Intamin and manufactured by Anton Schwarzkopf. A total of 12 installations were produced between 1977 and 1982. These 12 installations have been located in a total of 22 different amusement parks.

== History ==
The first installation of a Shuttle Loop dates back to 1977 when King Kobra opened at Kings Dominion. Two other rides were also installed that year: White Lightnin' at Carowinds and Tidal Wave at Marriott's Great America (California). Tidal Wave at Marriott's Great America (Illinois) opened in 1978 and was the last to feature the weight drop launch system. Also that year, Knott's Berry Farm opened Montezooma's Revenge and Six Flags AstroWorld opened Greezed Lightnin' as the first installations to feature the flywheel launch system. A number of installations followed across the world.

Twenty-two theme parks have operated Shuttle Loops, with half of the twelve original installations being relocated at some time. As of September 2013, only five installations are operating, with another one in storage. The remaining Shuttle Loops were either demolished or used for replacement parts on other installations.

== Notable installations ==
- The original King Kobra from Kings Dominion is the most traveled shuttle loop, having operated at Kings Dominion, Jolly Roger Amusement Park, Alton Towers and Hopi Hari.
- Montezooma's Revenge at Knott's Berry Farm is the longest running shuttle loop that is still in its original location. All of the shuttle loops that were installed before it have either been moved or destroyed. Following the closure of Kentucky Kingdom's Greezed Lightnin' in 2009, "Zooma" became the only operating shuttle loop in the United States until Indiana Beach's Shuttle Loop (previously stored at Niagara Amusement Park & Splash World). The ride was closed in 2022 for a major refurbishment and was originally set for a 2023 opening, but faced repeated delays due to construction issues. It reopened in 2026 with a linear synchronous motor launch system, new track, and a new train, provided by Dutch manufacturer Kumbak. The ride's name was also changed to MonteZOOMa: The Forbidden Fortress.
- Shuttle Loop at Nagashima Spa Land is the only remaining Shuttle Loop operating in Asia.
- The first European Shuttle Loop, Sirocco, was installed in 1982 at Walibi Belgium in Wavre, Belgium. In 1999, the ride was partially covered to reduce noise pollution and the name was changed to Turbine. Turbine closed in 2008 and reopened in 2013 with a new Gerstlauer train, a new linear induction motor launch system and a new name, Psyké Underground. The attraction is now fully covered, making it the first covered Shuttle Loop. The attraction closed again in early January 2025 and reopened in early April 2025 with a new industrial theme and another new Gerstlauer train. The attraction has since been renamed Turbine again.
- The shuttle loop, Greezed Lightnin', that operated at Kentucky Kingdom from 2003 to 2009 was composed of the two Tidal Wave Shuttle Loops from the Marriott's Great America parks in California and Illinois.
- The final new installation was Shuttle Loop at Oyama Yuenchi in 1980.
- Kennywood in Pittsburgh, PA included Laser Loop, a shuttle loop coaster opened in 1980 before being closed and relocated in 1990. It is currently stored at Indiana Beach and Niagara Amusement Park awaiting reconstruction.

== Ride ==
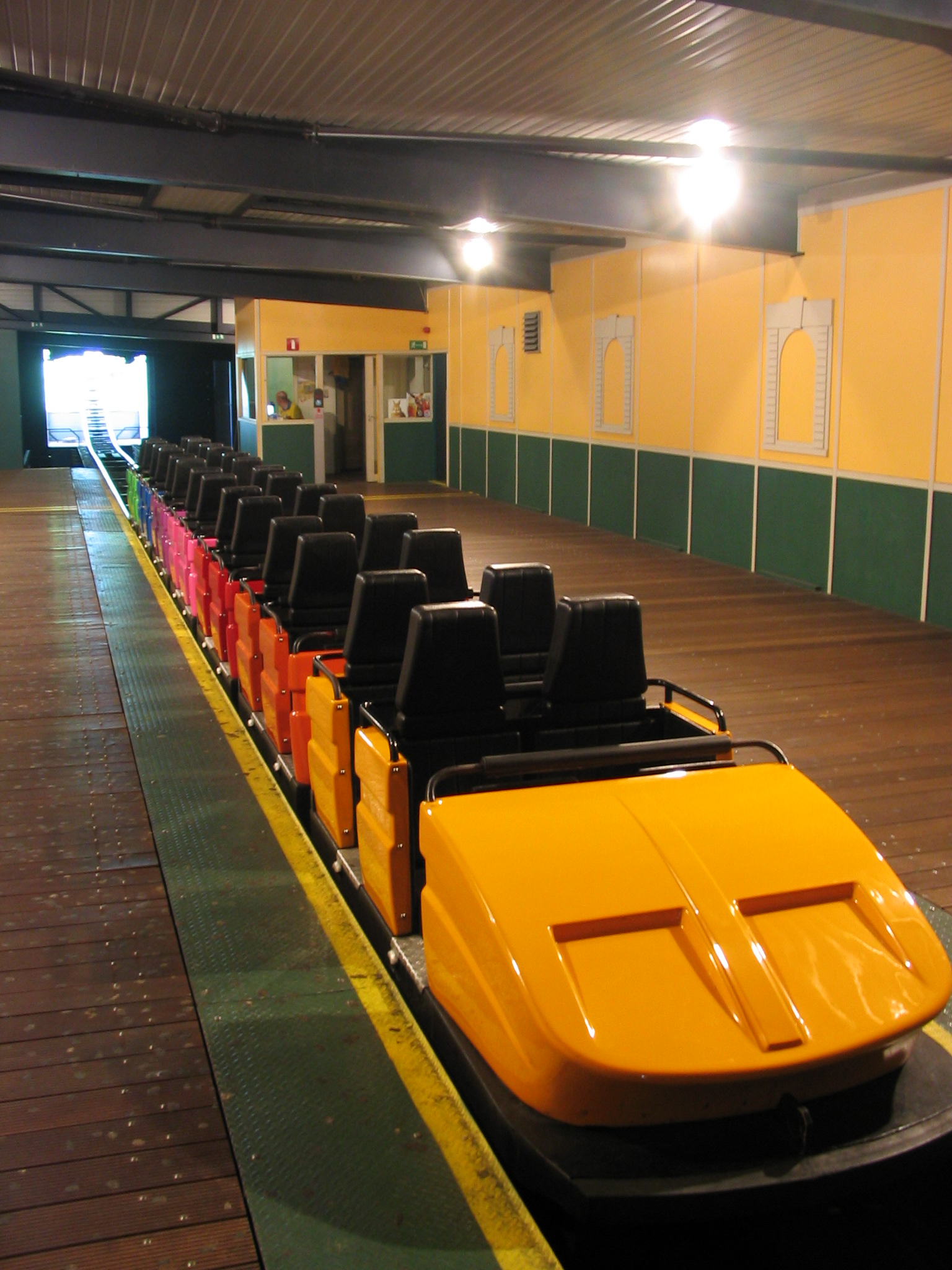
The original train and station of Turbine at Walibi Belgium

=== Experience ===
The train is launched out of the station at a speed of between 53 and 60 miles per hour (85 and 97 km/h) before passing through a vertical loop and up a 138-foot-tall spike (42 m). Once the momentum of the train runs out on the 70° spike, the train begins to traverse the track backwards, returning through the loop. The train then passes back through the station and goes up another 70° steep spike, which stands at 105 feet (32 m), until it stalls again and rolls forward back into the brake run and station.

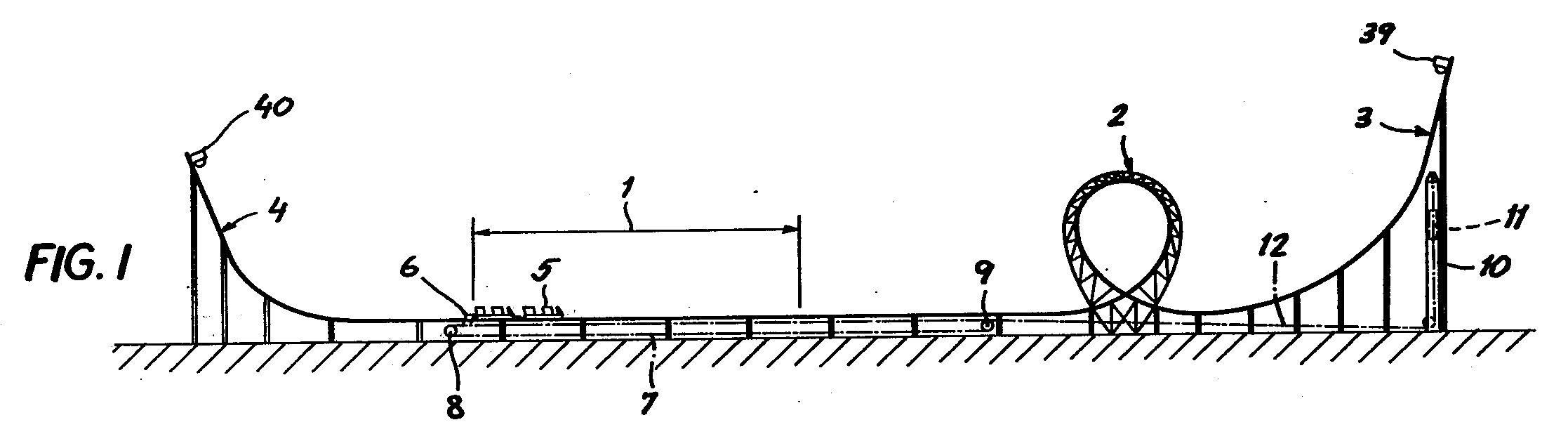
Figure 1 from Anton Schwarzkopf's patent for the Shuttle Loop roller coaster (patent US4165695, "Amusement ride with vertical track loop"). The image shows the overall layout of the ride.

=== Mechanics ===
Anton Schwarzkopf designed the Shuttle Loop in the late 1970s. He filed a patent for the concept in 1978 which was approved the following year. The patent describes two launch systems, both of which were implemented in various roller coasters:

- Weight drop – a number of the early installations in 1977 and 1978 featured a weight drop launch system. This system involved a catch car attaching itself to the train, which was attached to the weight via a cable. When the launch was triggered, the 40-tonne (39-long-ton; 44-short-ton) weight was dropped down a shaft pulling the cable and catch car which in turn pushed the train down the launch track.
- Flywheel - from 1978, all of the new installations featured a flywheel launch system. This system consists of a 6-tonne (5.9-long-ton; 6.6-short-ton) flywheel which is spun at over 1000 revolutions per minute. This flywheel engages a drive system, through a system of multiple clutches, that is attached to a cable that in-turn propels the train forward.

Gerstlauer completed an upgrade of Walibi Belgium's installation for the 2013 season. As part of the upgrade Gerstlauer replaced the existing flywheel launch system with a new linear induction motor (LIM) launch system. The company also added a new train. The ride was then completely enclosed and relaunched as Psyké Underground. The flywheel launch system is now displayed in the queue of the ride.

Knott's installation closed in 2022 for upgrades that were done by Kumbak. The ride received a new train, part of the track was replaced (this notably included the loop), the theming was updated, and a linear synchronus motor (LSM) launch system replaced the original flywheel launch system. It was originally set to reopen in 2023, but massive delays in construction caused the ride opening to be delayed to 2026. The ride now operates under the name MonteZOOMa: The Forbidden Fortress.

== Installations ==
Name	Park	Opened	Closed	Status	Length	Height	Speed	Launch
Golden Loop; White Lightnin'	Gold Reef City; Carowinds	1989; 1977	1988	Operating; Relocated to Gold Reef City	863 ft or 263 m	138 ft or 42 m	57 mph or 92 km/h	Weight Drop
Greased Lightnin'; Tidal Wave	Six Flags Discovery Kingdom; California's Great America	2003; 1977	2006; 2002	Removed; Relocated to Six Flags Discovery Kingdom	863 ft or 263 m	138 ft or 42 m	57 mph or 92 km/h	Weight Drop
Greezed Lightnin'; Viper; Tidal Wave	Kentucky Kingdom; Six Flags Over Georgia; Six Flags Great America	2003; 1995; 1978	2009 (Note: Ceased operation in 2009 before removal in 2013.); 2001; 1991	Removed (Note: The track was used as replacement parts for the Kentucky Kingdom installation during the 2005/2006 off season.); Relocated to Kentucky Kingdom; Relocated to Six Flags Over Georgia	863 ft or 263 m	138 ft or 42 m	57 mph or 92 km/h	Weight Drop
Katapul; Thunder Looper; King Kobra; King Kobra	Hopi Hari; Alton Towers; Jolly Roger Amusement Park; Kings Dominion	1999; 1990; 1987; 1977	1996; 1989; 1986	Operating; Relocated to Hopi Hari; Relocated to Alton Towers; Relocated to Jolly Roger Amusement Park	722 ft or 220 m	138 ft or 42 m	53 mph or 85 km/h	Weight Drop
MonteZOOMa: The Forbidden Fortress; Montezooma's Revenge	Knott's Berry Farm	2026; 1978	2022	Operating	800 ft or 240 m	148 ft or 45 m	55 mph or 89 km/h	LSM; Flywheel
Shuttle Loop	Nagashima Spa Land	1980		Operating	863 ft or 263 m	138 ft or 42 m	57 mph or 92 km/h	Flywheel
Shuttle Loop	Toshimaen	1980	2008	Removed (Note: Was set to be relocated to Attractiepark Rotterdam in 2018, but was later cancelled.)	863 ft or 263 m	138 ft or 42 m	57 mph or 92 km/h	Flywheel
Shuttle Loop	Ōyama Yūenchi	1980	2005	Removed	Unknown	Unknown	Unknown	Flywheel
Shuttle Loop	Yokohama Dreamland	1979	2002	Removed	920 ft or 280 m	138 ft or 42 m	56 mph or 90 km/h	Flywheel
Turbine; Psyké Underground; Turbine; Sirocco	Walibi Belgium	2025; 2013; 1999; 1982	2025; 2008; 1998	Operating	722 ft or 220 m	138 ft or 42 m	53 mph or 85 km/h	LIM; LIM; Flywheel; Flywheel
Unknown (Note: Coaster has been in storage near MacKenzie Park (track) and Larson Manufacturing (trains, flywheel and hardware) since 2006.); Greezed Lightnin'	Joyland Amusement Park; Six Flags AstroWorld	2012; 2006; 1978	2012; 2005	Scrapped; Ownership transferred to Cliff's Amusement Park; Relocated to Joyland Amusement Park	849 ft or 259 m	138 ft or 42 m	60 mph or 97 km/h	Flywheel
Unknown; Unknown; Cascabel 2.0; Cascabel; Laser Loop	Indiana Beach; Niagara Amusement Park & Splash World; La Feria Chapultepec Magico; Kennywood	TBA; 2022; 1994; 1980	2024; 2019; 1990	In Storage; Relocated to Indiana Beach; Relocated to Niagara Amusement Park; Relocated to La Feria Chapultepec Mágico	876 ft or 267 m	139 ft or 42 m	54 mph or 87 km/h	Flywheel

== Incidents ==
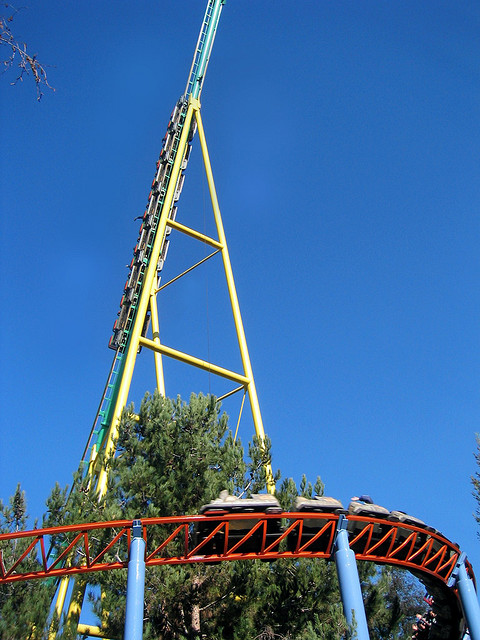
Montezooma's Revenge at Knott's Berry Farm

On August 27, 1997, the Sirocco at Walibi Wavre failed to launch at the correct speed. The train went to the loop very slowly and up the spike, to roll backwards. During the backwards passage of the loop, the train halted at the uppermost point, causing the train to get stuck hanging upside-down. The passengers were hanging heads-down for one hour and twenty minutes, only held in place with lap bar restraints. The train was pulled back further down the track with help of the local fire station brigade.

A 20-year-old woman died on September 1, 2001, one day after riding Montezooma's Revenge, the Shuttle Loop at Knott's Berry Farm. She suffered a ruptured middle cerebral artery, and an autopsy revealed a pre-existing condition. The ride was closed for several days while an investigation was conducted. Though state investigators concluded that the ride did not contribute to her death, a wrongful death lawsuit was later filed by her family in 2002. The lawsuit was dismissed in 2006.

== Notes ==
Preceded by Giant Coaster	World's Tallest Roller Coaster; 1977–1978	Succeeded by Montezooma's Revenge
