= Johnson Creek (Texas) =

Creek in Arlington, Texas

Coordinates: 32°45′25″N 97°04′23″W

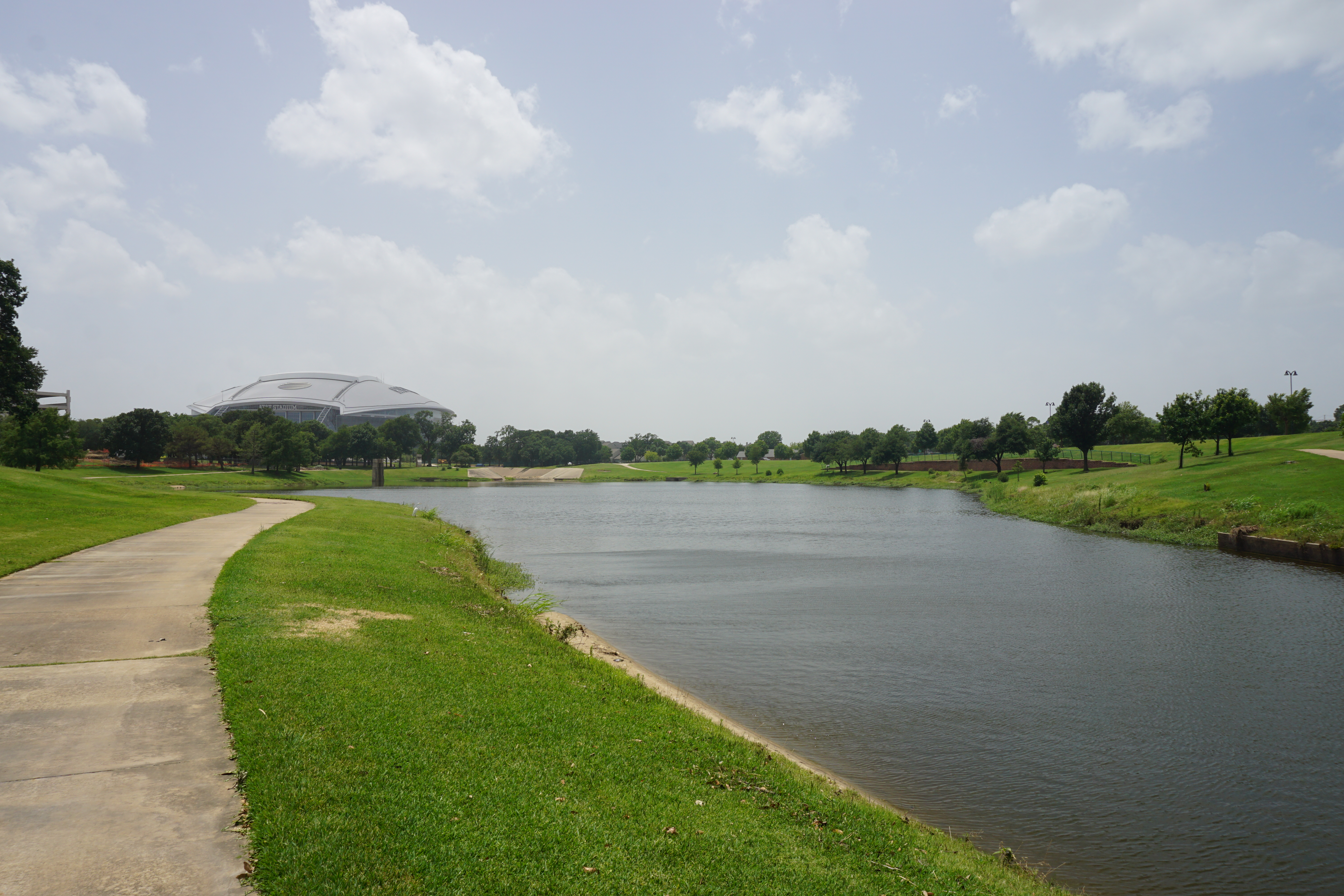
- Johnson Creek at Richard Greene Linear Park in Arlington
- Map

Location
- Country: United States
- State: Texas

Physical characteristics
- Mouth: West Fork Trinity River
- Length: 13 m (43 ft)

Johnson Creek is a creek and tributary of the Trinity River watershed in Dallas County and Tarrant County, North Texas.

The creek may be named after Middleton Tate Johnson, who settled in the area in the early 1840s.

== Course ==
Johnson Creek rises near Interstate 20 in eastern Tarrant County and runs northeasterly for 13 miles (21 km) to the West Fork of the Trinity River in Grand Prairie, within Dallas County.

The creek flows through the cities of Arlington and Grand Prairie and is generally completely bounded by development. Notably it flows through the Six Flags Over Texas theme park and beside both Globe Life Field and Globe Life Park (a wide spot on the north side of the ballpark is named Mark Holtz Lake in memory of the former baseball announcer), while a tributary flows along the southern edge of The University of Texas at Arlington.

== Richard Greene Linear Park ==
The Richard Greene Linear park was opened in 1994, named after the former Mayor of Arlington. Johnson Creek flows through the center of the park, with Mark Haltz Lake and the Unity Arch, and other sculptures being the main features.

== Ecology ==
In areas where development has not been substantial, native honeysuckle (Lonicera spp.), trumpet creeper (Campsis radicans), mustang grape (Vitis mustangensis), American elm (Ulmus americana), hackberry (Celtis laevigata), oak (Quercus spp.), pecan (Carya illinoinensis), and eastern cottonwood (Populus deltoides) can be found growing along the riparian zone of the creek's banks.

== See also ==
- List of rivers of Texas
