= Werner Stengel =

Roller coaster designer and engineer

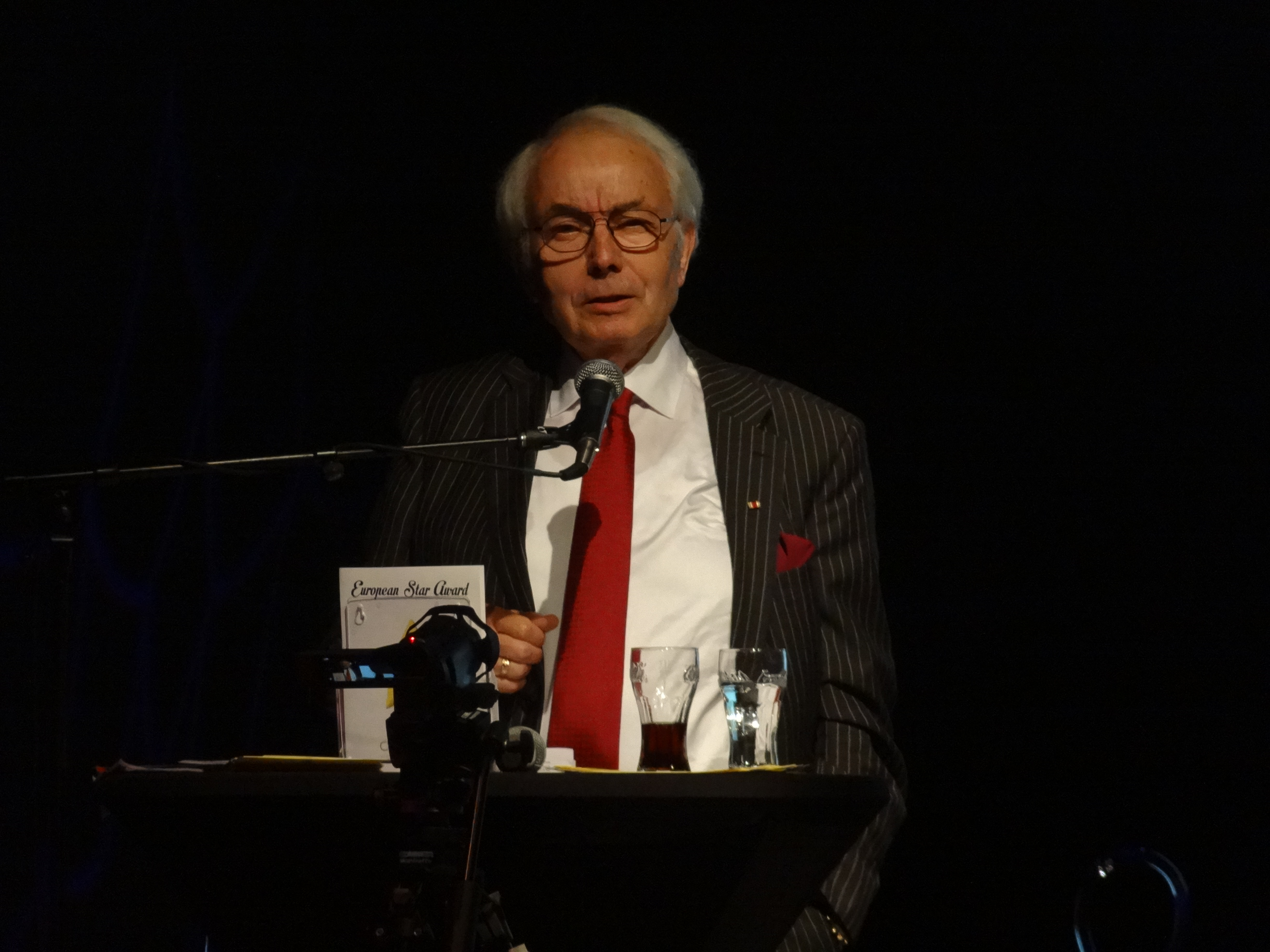
- Werner Stengel in 2017
- Born: 22 August 1936 (age 88); Bochum, Germany
- Other names: Ingenieurbüro Stengel GmbH
- Occupation: Roller coaster designer
- Years active: 1963–present
- Known for: Multiple roller coaster manufacturers

Werner Stengel (born 22 August 1936, in Bochum) is a German roller coaster designer and engineer. Stengel is the founder of Stengel Engineering, also known as Ingenieurbüro Stengel GmbH (or Ingenieurbuero Stengel GmbH).

Stengel first worked on amusement park rides in collaboration with Anton Schwarzkopf in 1963. He established his own company, Stengel Engineering, in 1965. His collaboration with Schwarzkopf was responsible for many innovations in roller coaster design, including in 1976 the first modern "vertical" looping coaster, Revolution, at Six Flags Magic Mountain. (Arrow Dynamics had debuted the first modern inversion, the corkscrew, a year earlier at Knott's Berry Farm). His clothoid loop is now standard on many roller coasters, as it produces less intense forces on the human body than a circular vertical loop. In 1976 Stengel and Schwarzkopf established the first horizontal launch "Shuttle Loop". He was a pioneer in heartlining, the principle of having the track twist and rotate around the rider's heart line, rather than the track rotating around its own center.

Stengel has worked on many of the world's record-breaking roller coasters, including Son of Beast, Millennium Force, Superman The Ride, Top Thrill Dragster, Kingda Ka, Dollywood's Mystery Mine, El Toro, Maverick and Olympia Looping, the world's largest portable roller coaster, among many others. Seventy-two percent of the attractions on the 2004 Amusement Today Golden Ticket Awards list of the world's top fifty steel roller coasters were designed by Stengel Engineering.

Stengel received an honorary doctorate from University of Gothenburg in 2005 for "inexhaustible creativity in linking physics and design to the experience of the body in roller coasters and other rides,".

In 2002, he designed the "Stengel Dive," the roller coaster element that bears his name, for Goliath at Walibi Holland, Netherlands.

Stengel celebrated his 500th roller coaster with the opening of Maverick, located at Cedar Point.

He is semi-retired and serves as a consultant to the amusement park ride industry.
