= Alpen Blitz =

Defunct roller coaster

Six Flags Great Adventure
- Location: Six Flags Great Adventure
- Coordinates: 40.1371°N 74.4411°W
- Status: Removed
- Opening date: 1976
- Closing date: 1978
- Replaced: Jumbo Jet
- Replaced by: Haunted Castle

General statistics
- Type: Steel
- Manufacturer: Anton Schwarzkopf
- Designer: Werner Stengel
- Model: Alpenblitz II
- Height: 16 ft (4.9 m)
- Drop: 2 ft (0.61 m)
- Length: 1,800 ft (550 m)
- Speed: 10 mph (16 km/h)
- Duration: 0:22
- G-force: 1
- Height restriction: 44 in (112 cm)
- Alpen Blitz at RCDB

Alpen Blitz was a compact steel roller coaster that operated at Six Flags Great Adventure from 1976 to 1978. It was designed by Anton Schwarzkopf.

At the end of 1974, it was determined that Great Adventure needed two additional roller coasters and an additional flume ride to accommodate huge crowds. So they purchased compact and inexpensive coasters called Jumbo Jet and Big Fury. Big Fury opened in the spring of 1975. Jumbo Jet was removed a month after it was built by the end of August in 1975. To replace Jumbo Jet, "Alpen Blitz" was purchased and was built on the site Jumbo Jet was to have occupied.

The Alpen Blitz was located in the area later occupied by the "Haunted Castle". Autobahn Bumper Cars are in this area today. By 1977, Great Adventure management began to build a steel looping coaster that would be known as Lightnin' Loops. At that point, Six Flags purchased the park. After the 1978 season when "Lightning Loops" opened, it was determined that Alpen Blitz was no longer needed. It was sold and removed to make room for other flat rides. Big Fury was also sold and replaced with the Wild Rider at the end of the 1977 season.
