= SFGA =

SFGA is an abbreviation that can refer to one of two Six Flags amusement parks:

- Six Flags Great Adventure, in Jackson, New Jersey
- Six Flags Great America, in Gurnee, Illinois
