= Wild Rider =

Wild Rider or similar may refer to:

- Wild Rider (Six Flags Great Adventure), the name of two defunct rides located at Six Flags Great Adventure amusement park during the 1970s
- Wildrider (Transformers), a character from The Transformers television series
- The Wild Rider (Schumann), a musical piece by Robert Schumann from his "Album for the Young"

== See also ==
- The Wild Ride, a 1960 film
- "Wild Ride", a song by Shashwat Sachdev and Ellisar from the 2026 Indian film Dhurandhar: The Revenge
