= Haunted Castle (Six Flags Great Adventure) =

Defunct haunted attraction

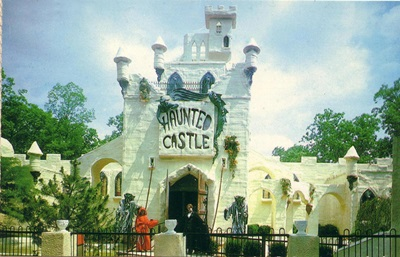
- Postcard photo c. 1981

Six Flags Great Adventure
- Coordinates: 40.1371°N 74.4411°W
- Status: Removed
- Opening date: 1978 (Original); 1979 (as Haunted Castle)
- Closing date: 1979 (Original); May 11, 1984 (as Haunted Castle)
- Replaced: Alpen Blitz
- Replaced by: Botanical Gardens

Ride statistics
- Attraction type: Haunted attraction

The Haunted Castle was a haunted attraction at Six Flags Great Adventure amusement park in Jackson Township, New Jersey, United States. It opened in 1979, replacing a smaller haunted house that had operated the previous year. On May 11, 1984, a fire destroyed the attraction, trapping and killing eight teenagers.

The Haunted Castle featured a medieval-style exterior with towers, turrets, a drawbridge, and a surrounding moat. Behind the façade, seventeen interconnected trailers housed a maze of dimly lit corridors featuring theatrical props, horror-themed scenes, and costumed actors who startled passing visitors. Initially intended as a seasonal attraction, the Haunted Castle proved popular enough that the park extended its lease and retained it as a permanent attraction.

Following the fire, Six Flags Great Adventure and its parent company Six Flags were indicted for aggravated manslaughter. Prosecutors argued that the defendants had ignored repeated warnings from safety consultants to install sprinklers or fire alarms. The defendants maintained that the fire was arson and that additional precautions would not have prevented the deaths. A jury acquitted the companies of the criminal charges, but Six Flags paid millions of dollars in civil settlements to the victims' families.

== Operation ==
The purpose of the Haunted Castle walk-through dark ride was to entertain its customers by frightening them. Exterior decorations included plastic monsters, skulls and other features meant to create a frightening atmosphere. A facade of false turrets and towers lent the illusion of height to the one-story structure, completing the look of a foreboding medieval castle. After crossing a drawbridge over the surrounding moat, visitors entered the castle and felt their way along a 450-foot (140 m)-long convoluted path of dim corridors, occasionally being startled when employee actors dressed as mummies, vampires, and other creatures jumped from hiding. Various theatrical props and exhibits were in view, including coffins, ghoulish mannequins, hanging spider webs and skeletons. Alcoves along the route were used to present vignettes of famous and infamous characters and events from movies, horror and ghost stories, and sometimes real life, with live employed actors portraying the stars of the scene. Count Dracula, Frankenstein's monster, the Wolf Man and Lizzie Borden were frequent guest stars. Strobe lights and eerie sounds completed the scene.

The layout of the Haunted Castle was two sets of eight semi-trailers lined up in a mirror configuration. A single trailer was placed in the middle of the configuration for use as a control room, from which the lights, sounds, and other effects were managed; and for changing rooms for the young men and women who acted the parts of the monsters and ghouls present on the tour. During slow times only one side of the attraction would be used. Peak attendance would cause the park to open both sides, allowing thousands of visitors to enjoy the attraction. Guests would enter the Castle via the typical switchback guide rails used at amusement parks which led to a gate. From there, the guests would enter through the drawbridge main portal where a doorman would direct them to the entrance of the actual walk-through. At peak times, the doorman would alternate sides to keep a gap between groups to allow for greater effect and to keep the leaders from warning the following group of upcoming surprises.

== Construction and history ==
Originally known as the Haunted House, the attraction was constructed of four aluminum semi-trailers when it opened in 1978. It was intended as a test for a more substantial attraction that was to be built the following year. The four trailers came from the Toms River Haunted House Company, owned by George Mahana, with scenes preinstalled. The lessee was responsible for the construction of a façade that would create the illusion of a haunted house. The park built a wooden front that resembled a white, two-story house with forest green shingles and shutters, contained by a wrought-iron fence and gates, and accentuated with stucco planters. The guide rails for the waiting lines were left over from the previous ride that had been on the site, Alpen Blitz. To help create the right mood, creepy music was played over exterior speakers.

The Haunted House attraction had a gatekeeper stationed outside with a doorkeeper admitting visitors, while three or four monsters inside occupied various scenes or wandered around surprising and frightening groups of visitors. The staffing requirements for the haunted house were drawn from other areas of the park; they were clowns and street performers when they were not acting as vampires or serial killers.

At the end of the 1978 season, the four trailers were taken away by the manufacturer and sent to Six Flags Over Mid-America (now known as Six Flags St. Louis) in Eureka, Missouri. There they were reassembled and would continue to run from 1979 through 1982. The site in Jackson was cleared to make way for the Botanical Gardens.

Having passed the test, the Haunted Castle was assembled on a new site in 1979, consisting of seventeen interconnected aluminum trailers leased from the same manufacturer—eight to a side mirroring each other—with separate corridors and a common control room in the center. The castle's trailers were linked by plywood partitions to create a complex maze. The interiors were built of plywood walls and ceilings with wooden studs for support. The materials used on the walls included foam rubber, various fabrics and plastics, plywood and tar paper. Wax mannequins were used as props. Attached to its exterior were painted turrets and towers of plywood on wooden frames intended to emulate a medieval façade.

The management of Great Adventure had not expected the success of the attraction and did not pay it much attention. Despite this, the Haunted Castle became the park's largest single-show attraction since its construction. During peak attendance times both sides of the attraction would be in use, and thousands of visitors would come to the Haunted Castle throughout the normal hours of operation. The original planning had been to treat the attraction as seasonal and disassemble the trailers and send them back at the end of the season. Because of its unexpected success, it was decided instead to extend the lease and add it to the list of permanent attractions.

== 1984 fire ==
A fire began in the attraction at 6:35 p.m. on May 11, 1984. Fanned by the building's air conditioning, it spread rapidly due to the use of flammable building materials. Approximately 29 guests were in the attraction at the time. Fourteen, including four park employees, managed to escape. Seven who survived were treated for smoke inhalation. Those killed included eight teenagers from a group of nine that entered together. The lone survivor of the group was carried to safety by a park employee.

One witness, whose group entered several minutes after the group who fell victim, later testified that she saw flames coming from around the bend of the attraction's Hunchback display. She originally thought it was part of the show but realized the flames were real after smelling smoke. Her group yelled "Fire!" and ran back to the entrance, bumping into walls.

Firefighters from eleven surrounding communities responded, and the fire was declared under control by 7:45 p.m. The park remained open during this time but closed shortly after. No one realized that lives were lost until later that evening, when the bodies of the teenagers were discovered in one of the attraction's trailers. The bodies were burnt beyond recognition and were originally thought to be mannequins.

Only one side of the structure, utilizing 9 of the 17 trailers, was occupied at the time of the fire. During the subsequent criminal trial, the Jackson Township fire inspector testified that he had never inspected the castle. The township considered the castle a "temporary structure", even after it had been at the park for five years, based on the fact that the trailers were still on wheels. The castle lacked a building permit, a certificate of occupancy, fire and smoke detectors, and sprinklers despite repeated recommendations by the park's own safety consultants.

=== Victims ===
Out of the reported 29 people (14 park employees and 15 visitors) that were occupying the building at the time of the fire, eight people were killed, all of whom were visitors. The following people lost their lives in the disaster:

- Joseph R. Beyroutey, Jr. (17)
- Nicola C. Caiazza (17)
- Jose A. Carrion, Jr. (17)
- Tina M. Genovese (15)
- Christopher P. Harrison (17)
- Eric Rodriguez (18)
- Lennyn Ruiz (16)
- Samuel Valentin, Jr. (17)

=== Investigation ===
The fire highlighted a complex collection of local, state and federal laws. New Jersey's Department of Labor and Industries inspects the safety of rides, such as roller coasters and ferris wheels. Locally, municipalities enforce state and local building codes governing fire safety and electrical wiring. In turn, the state's Department of Community Affairs is responsible for ensuring that municipalities enforce the codes. Finally, the federal Occupational Safety and Health Administration (OSHA) is responsible for monitoring employee safety. A state panel investigating the fire said that the regulatory system had failed at almost every level, and that the Haunted Castle had been in violation of a dozen state fire codes.

The panel said the state's Uniform Construction Code required the owners to install smoke detectors and several other common safety devices before the castle opened. A spokesman for the local volunteer fire department said it had not enforced the state requirement for smoke detectors because the township's building inspector said that the code did not apply: the inspector had determined that the Castle was a temporary structure.

Eight days after the fire, a statement by the Ocean County Prosecutor's Office said a thirteen-year-old boy had called the police after hearing radio reports that investigators were looking for witnesses. The boy told the police that he had been befriended by a fourteen-year-old boy at the castle's entrance. He said the older youth, who appeared to be familiar with the castle, offered to guide him through. He said the older youth used a cigarette lighter to find his way down a long corridor that was dark because of a malfunctioning strobe light, and he eventually bumped into and ignited a foam-rubber wall pad. The prosecutor exonerated the older youth, who has never been identified, of any criminal wrongdoing.

=== Legal proceedings ===
On September 14, 1984, a grand jury in Toms River, New Jersey, indicted Six Flags Great Adventure and its parent company, Six Flags, on a charge of aggravated manslaughter, for "recklessly causing the deaths under circumstances manifesting extreme indifference to human life". The indictment also charged two park executives, the general manager at the time of the fire and his predecessor, with manslaughter for reckless conduct in ignoring repeated warnings of safety violations.

The criminal trial began in New Jersey Superior Court in Toms River on May 29, 1985. The prosecution argued that repeated warnings by safety consultants to install sprinklers or smoke alarms had been ignored. The defendants denied any culpability, and contended that the fire was arson and that no precautions would have saved lives.

The prosecution called as witnesses fire-prevention consultants who had inspected the castle, and who had recommended the installation of sprinklers or smoke alarms. They told the jury that after five years of semiannual inspections, the devices were not in place when the attraction burned down. Shift managers called to testify stated that "none of the exit lights were working, bulbs were missing from other lights and there were no fire alarms, despite a history of patrons using matches and cigarette lighters in the dark corridors". They further testified that their pleas for safety precautions had been rejected by management as too expensive. They also testified that a ripped "crash pad" in the corridor had exposed foam rubber padding.

The boy who had come forward as a witness during the initial investigation repeated what he had told investigators earlier, testifying for the prosecution that he had seen another boy his age—a boy he did not know—accidentally set the fire with a cigarette lighter by brushing its flame against a foam wall pad. According to news reports of the trial, no such boy was ever found, and no other witness testified to seeing such a boy. Under cross-examination by the defense, the boy denied starting the fire himself.

The defense denied any culpability, saying that company executives had carefully considered all safety recommendations, acting on some and rejecting others, and contending that the fire was arson and that no precautions would have saved lives in a fire where an accelerant was used. A defense forensic pathologist said arson might be the cause, saying that "high levels" of benzene in the victims' blood "could indicate some sinister reason for the fire". However, another defense witness said there were no burn patterns or other evidence of an accelerant.

Park officials testified that smoke alarms had been installed, but the park was unable to control vandalism to them and decided not to reinstall them after 1979. A park official testified that having an employee assigned to walk continually through the attraction was a good alternative to the smoke alarms. A top fire-safety official testifying for the defense said that sprinklers and smoke detectors might have saved part of the structure, but would not have saved lives because by then "you would have had lethal combustion products throughout the facility" suffocating the victims. His testimony was later criticised by other fire-safety experts as undermining efforts to advance sprinkler legislation.

==== Verdict ====
The jury, after an eight-week trial and thirteen hours of deliberation, found the two companies not guilty of the charges. Interviewed after the trial, the jury foreman blamed Jackson Township officials for repeatedly allowing the Castle to exploit flaws in the fire code. A second juror disagreed, saying that township officials were not derelict. Both jurors held the two companies blameless because they had been told by township officials that they needed no permit or sprinklers.

=== Aftermath ===
==== Legal aftermath ====
The two park executives charged separately with manslaughter avoided trial and possible imprisonment by entering a pretrial intervention program that allowed them to perform community service.

The families of four of the victims filed civil suits against Bally Manufacturing, the owner of Six Flags; Six Flags Great Adventure; and the Castle's builder, George Mahana, the owner of Toms River Haunted House Company, charging manslaughter and aggravated manslaughter. New York City Board of Education, the State of New Jersey, Ocean County and Jackson Township were also included in the various suits. Seven of the eight families later settled out of court for $2.5 million each; the eighth family chose to go to trial and was awarded $750,000.

==== Effects on the park and similar attractions ====
Immediately after the fire, several other New Jersey haunted house attractions were closed pending fire inspections, including the multi-trailer "Doorway to Hell" on Casino Pier in Seaside Heights, New Jersey, also built by Toms River Haunted House Company. New Jersey and other states passed new fire-safety laws for dark rides and "any structure that intentionally disorients".

Park attendance at Six Flags Great Adventure fell sharply for the rest of the year, finishing fifteen percent below the $3.3 million for the year preceding. Park officials said pre-fire attendance levels were restored the next year after they reassured the public that the park was made safer by the addition of $5.2 million worth of sprinklers and computerized smoke and heat detectors. However, industry sources were reporting that ensuing poor attendance almost caused the park to close in 1987.

==== Doorway to Hell? ====
An independent film titled Doorway to Hell? The Mystery and Controversy Surrounding the Fire at the Haunted Castle was produced in 2003 by Peter James Smith, a long-time patron of the Haunted Castle. Smith's documentary, which won a "Best Research" award at the 2004 New York International Independent Film and Video Festival, documents the fire, investigation and trial, and questions the official report's finding that the fire was accidental. Smith speaks of an "emotionally disturbed" youth with a history of setting fires who "kept playing with a lighter in his pocket" and resembled the boy that was said to have started the fire. He says the youth was seen exiting the attraction as the fire broke out and was later questioned by police but not charged due to lack of evidence.

The film says that two earlier visitors on the day of the fire reported finding an exit door chained shut, but they were not called as witnesses. (Ocean County authorities reported no physical evidence of chained doors and dismissed such claims.) Some visitors and employees Smith interviewed thought doors were blocked at times for the security of the actors and to keep people from going outside to smoke cigarettes or marijuana.

Smith also says that diagrams of the castle and its exits used in the trial were inaccurate, and did not show a metal fence erected to protect actors from hostile guests, something that would have made escape more difficult, and was found at the scene. Great Adventure officials declined to comment on the film.

== See also ==
- Incidents at Six Flags parks
- Amusement park accidents
