= Larry Chickola =

Lawrence John Chickola
- Born: 1964 (age 61–62)
- Education: University of Michigan (BS); UCLA (MS)
- Occupation: Professional engineer
- Years active: 1995 to present
- Employer: Six Flags Entertainment
- Known for: Roller coasters

Lawrence John Chickola (born 1964) is an engineer known for designing roller coasters.

== Early life and education ==
In an interview, Chickola said that he attended DeLaSalle High in Detroit, Michigan.

Chickola earned a Bachelor of Science in Mechanical engineering from the University of Michigan and a Master of Science at UCLA.

== Career ==
=== Early career ===
After graduation, Chickola designed equipment for satellites for the Hughes Aircraft Company. He later held jobs with Lockheed Martin in Los Angeles, California and Amtrak.

=== Six Flags ===
Chickola was asked to overhaul the Runaway Mine Train roller coaster in 1995. He completely re-engineered the 21-year-old coaster with a new motor, cars and computer operating system.

In 2001, the Six Flags Entertainment Corporation promoted Chickola to chief corporate engineer. He is responsible for the design, maintenance and safety of 120 roller coasters and over 600 other amusement park rides. Chickola redesigned the Texas Giant, a wooden roller coaster, into the world's first hybrid roller coaster.

Chickola helped develop standards for roller coasters in New Jersey. The New Jersey standards were almost identical to guidelines set by ASTM International.

=== Research ===
Chickola participated in a study of risks of traumatic brain injury from riding roller coasters and co-authored the report.

=== Media appearances ===
Chickola appeared in two episodes of the Travel Channel's series Insane Coaster Wars. He was featured in a segment of CBS This Morning on May 15, 2013.
