= Jumbo Jet (Six Flags Great Adventure) =

Defunct roller coaster

- Jumbo Jet, closed, 1975

Six Flags Great Adventure
- Location: Six Flags Great Adventure
- Coordinates: 40°8′15.71″N 74°26′25.65″W
- Status: Removed
- Replaced by: Super Cat; Alpen Blitz

General statistics
- Type: Steel
- Manufacturer: Anton Schwarzkopf
- Designer: Werner Stengel
- Model: Jet Star 3 / Jumbo Jet
- Lift/launch system: Electric spiral lift
- Height: 56 ft (17 m)
- Inversions: 0
- Jumbo Jet at RCDB

Jumbo Jet was a prefabricated steel roller coaster located within the Fun Fair section of Great Adventure in Jackson, New Jersey. Erected in 1975, the attraction was an example of the Jet Star 3 / Jumbo Jet model line designed by Werner Stengel and manufactured by Anton Schwarzkopf.

== Layout ==
The ride was the first Jet Star 3 / Jumbo Jet model coaster to be built in the state of New Jersey. Unlike typical chain lifted or launched roller coasters, this model reached the first drop by way of small wheel motors that drove it up the incline of a helix. Electric spiral lift coasters, which became very common in the 1970s, differed from later steel roller coaster designs in track gauge.

== History ==
Contemporary press accounts quote Great Adventure Vice President of Operations Robert Minick as saying that Jumbo Jet was "the largest ready-made roller coaster that [could] be bought". The coaster was leased from Willy Miller's Continental Park Attractions, along with several other rides in the Fun Fair section.

Assembled in the spring of 1975, the ride stood idle for weeks, never to be operated or opened to the public, before being dismantled one month later.

The ultimate fate of the ride remains unknown until at least being founded out by time. Although Roller Coaster DataBase once proposed that it might be the Jumbo Jet at Morey's Piers, evidence exists that the latter attraction was in fact purchased in Germany. RCDB later listed the Canadian National Exhibition as another possible site at which the ride may have operated.
