= Lil' Devil Coaster =

Steel roller coaster

- Previously known as Road Runner Railway (1999 - 2019)
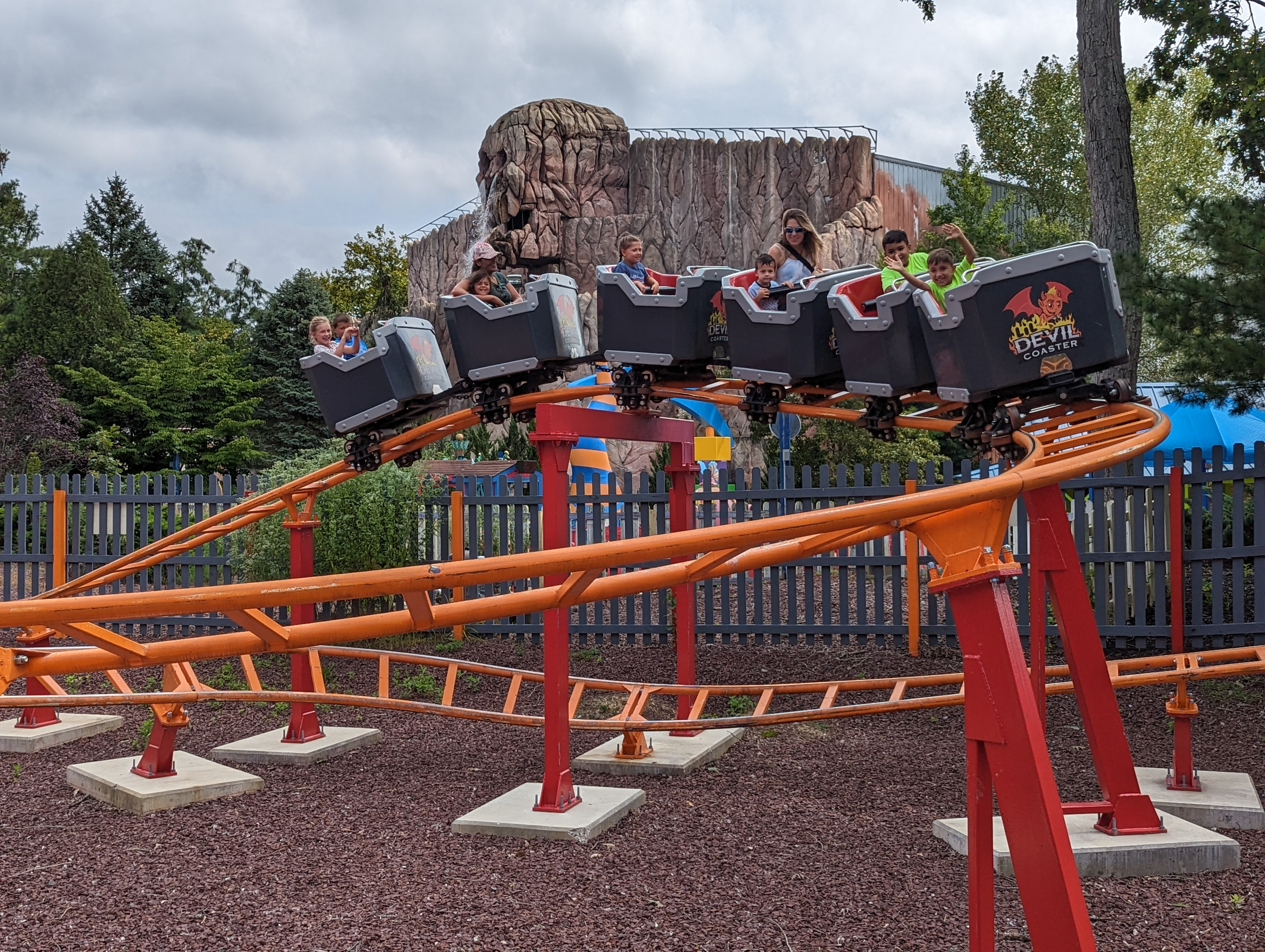

Six Flags Great Adventure
- Location: Six Flags Great Adventure
- Park section: Jr. Thrill Seekers
- Coordinates: 40.13432°N 74.44339°W
- Status: Operating
- Opening date: 1999 as Road Runner Railway; 2021 as Lil' Devil Coaster

General statistics
- Type: Steel – Kiddie
- Manufacturer: Zamperla
- Model: Family Gravity Coaster 80STD
- Track layout: Single Helix (center)
- Lift/launch system: Chain lift hill
- Height: 13 ft (4.0 m)
- Length: 262.5 ft (80.0 m)
- Inversions: 0
- Duration: 0:40
- Trains: Single train with 6 cars. Riders are arranged 2 across in a single row for a total of 12 riders per train.
- Lil' Devil Coaster at RCDB

Lil' Devil Coaster (formerly Road Runner Railway) is a steel roller coaster located at Six Flags Great Adventure in Jackson Township, New Jersey. The ride opened in 1999 as Road Runner Railway, but was reintroduced as Lil’ Devil Coaster in 2021. It was manufactured by Zamperla of Italy and is a small, kiddie coaster located in the Jr. Thrill Seekers section of the park. It is themed to the Jersey Devil to fit in with the nearby Jersey Devil Coaster.

== History ==
=== Road Runner Railway (1999 - 2019) ===
As part of the park's "War on Lines", the park added the kiddie roller coaster. Manufactured by Zamperla, the coaster was the first coaster for children since the removal of the park's Lil' Thunder kiddie coaster in 1983.

After the 2019 season, the ride was temporarily removed due to the upcoming addition of Jersey Devil Coaster.

=== Lil Devil Coaster (2021 - present) ===
On July 8, 2021, the park officially announced the ride as the park's 14th coaster, which would be a re-theme and relocation of the ride, themed similarly to the coaster that replaced it. The new ride would feature orange track with red supports. Later that year, the park re-opened the ride in time for their Fright Fest halloween event.
