= Six Flags Wild Safari Adventure =

Safari attraction

Six Flags Wild Safari
- Interactive map of Six Flags Wild Safari
- 40°8′5″N 74°25′40″W
- Date opened: July 4, 1974; 52 years ago
- Location: Jackson Township, New Jersey, United States
- Land area: 350 acres (1.4 km^{2})
- No. of animals: 1,200
- Website: www.sixflags.com/greatadventure/wild-safari

Six Flags Wild Safari Adventure is a safari park adjacent to Six Flags Great Adventure in Jackson Township, New Jersey. The attraction originally opened on July 4, 1974, as a drive-through safari park, and closed on September 30, 2012, to become its own standalone ride experience called the Safari Off Road Adventure.

Owing to the COVID-19 pandemic in 2020, the attraction returned to being a drive-through experience for private vehicles, with tickets that were bought separately from the main park, until the Safari Off Road Adventure reopened for the 2024 season.

== History ==
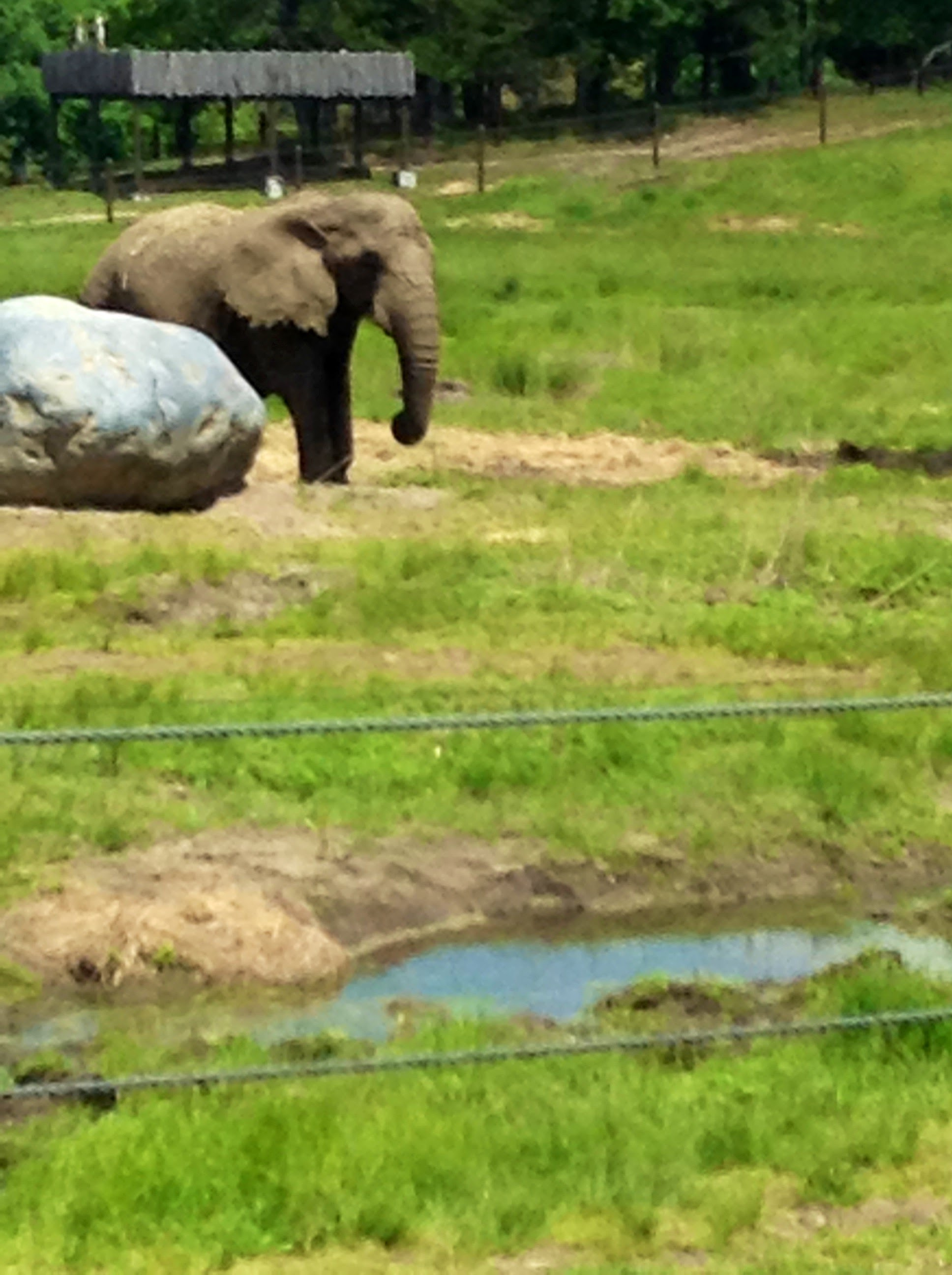
An African bush elephant on safari in May 2014.

When Warner LeRoy was proposing the Great Adventure park, his original proposal was to also include a drive-thru safari. The planned drive-thru was to have 10 miles (16 km) of road with twelve sections, natural elements such as waterfalls, and featured large herds of animals. Though it was never realized, some of the park's animals from the proposal appeared in the park in a slightly different form.

Six Flags Wild Safari was opened to the public on July 4, 1974, along with its theme park neighbor, Great Adventure.

On August 20, 2012, Six Flags announced that the park would be closed to private vehicles from September 30, 2012, and that the animals would remain in the preserve. On August 30, 2012, Six Flags announced that they would open the Safari Off Road Adventure in 2013. Following Wild Safari's closure on September 30, 2012, construction began to renovate it to become the Safari Off Road Adventure. Safari Off Road Adventure opened May 25, 2013. The attraction uses open air safari vehicles that were remodeled from former Army trucks.

In March 2020, Six Flags suspended all operations across all their properties due to the COVID-19 pandemic. During the continuation of the pandemic in May, Six Flags Great Adventure announced that they plan on reopening the Safari Off Road Adventure while keeping the rest of the park closed. This comes after the Governor of New Jersey signed an executive order to allow drive-thru venues to resume operations on May 13. Safari Off Road Adventure reopened on May 30, with the attraction going back to its historic routes and becoming once again a drive-through safari. A month later, Six Flags Great Adventure announced their new opening date for the season on July 3, 2020. Plans were in place for Safari Off Road Adventure to return with the theme park operations, but park officials stated that the safari will continue its own operations, due to the popularity and the ability for guest to continue social distancing while in their own vehicles.

For the 2022 and 2023 season, the Safari Off Road Adventure was repurposed into the Giraffe Encounter Tour, an up-charge VIP experience which retained the ride station, vehicles, and queue.

The Safari Off Road Adventure reopened for the 2024 of the park's 50th anniversary. As part of this offering, a new Safari Base Camp that serves as a new entrance and exit to the attraction outside the park was added. In addition, a resort that features 20 suites was added to the safari in summer 2024.

== Overview ==
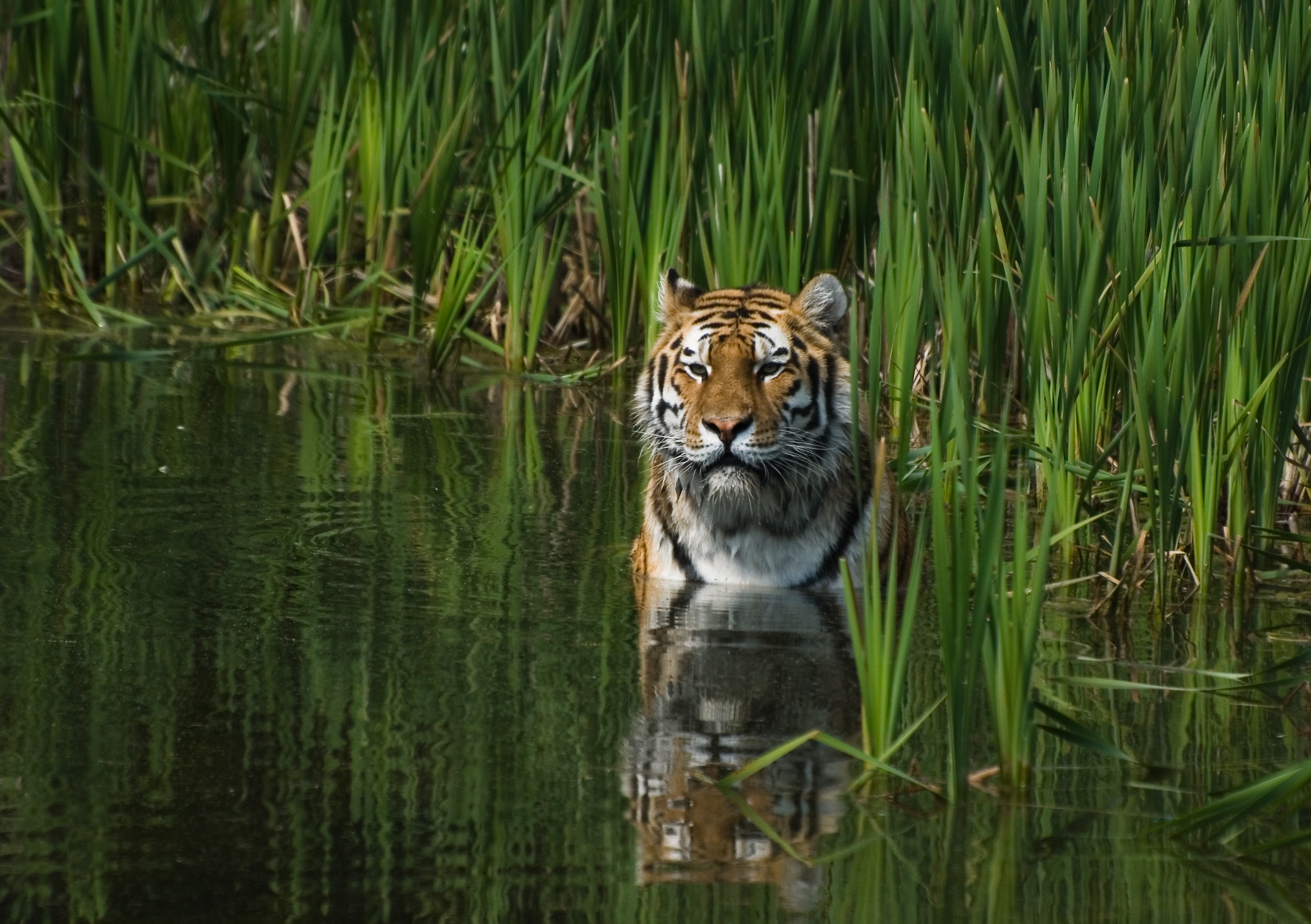
A tiger in the water.

The Wild Safari park covers 350 acres (1.4 km^{2}) with the main road being 4.5 miles (7.2 km) long. It contains 11 themed sections and is a home to 1,200 animals from six different continents. When the safari attraction was joined with Great Adventure to form one park in 2013, it made Six Flags Great Adventure the second-largest theme park in the world at 475 acres (1.92 km^{2}), after Disney's Animal Kingdom. Since its renovation, Safari Off Road Adventure retains the themed areas from Wild Safari.

== Animals ==
=== The Americas ===
- European fallow deer
- Roosevelt elk
- American bison
- Llama
- Greater rhea

=== Afrikka ===
- African bush elephant
- Common ostrich
- Southern white rhinoceros
- Grant's zebra
- Asian water buffalo

=== Wilde Plains ===
- Blackbuck
- Common eland
- Ellipsis waterbuck
- Beisa oryx
- Scimitar-horned oryx
- Indian peafowl
- Red Ankole cattle
- Reticulated giraffe
- White-bearded gnu
- Bongo

=== Serengeti Grasslands ===
- Addax
- Sable antelope
- White-tailed gnu
- Aoudad

=== Kingsland ===
- African lion

=== Black Bear Ridge ===
- American black bear

=== Wilde Plains Lowlands ===
- Red lechwe
- Greater kudu

=== Terra Ursus ===
- European brown bear

=== Conservation Area ===
- White-tailed deer
- American red fox
- Northern raccoon
- Virginia opossum
- Eastern box turtle
- Red-eared slider
- Bald eagle

=== Didgeridoo Pass ===
- Red kangaroo
- Emu

=== Tigris Asiana ===
- Bengal tiger
- Siberian tiger
- Nilgai
- Yak
- Blackbuck
- Aoudad

=== Baboon Village ===
- Olive baboon

== See also ==
- Kilimanjaro Safaris
- Rhino Rally
- Safari park
- 2013 in amusement parks
