= Skull Mountain =

Indoor roller coaster

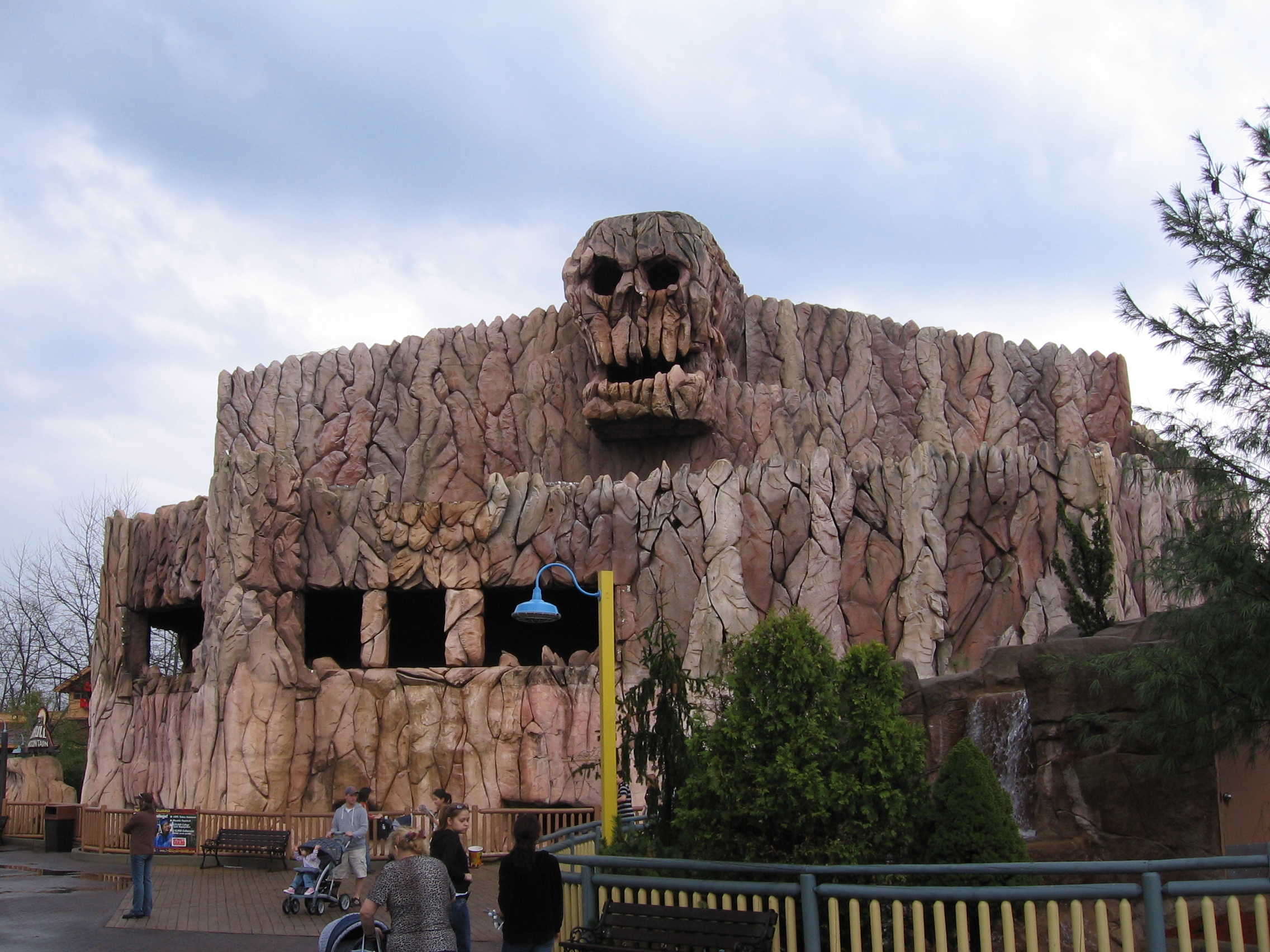
- Skull Mountain's exterior

Six Flags Great Adventure
- Location: Six Flags Great Adventure
- Park section: Lakefront
- Coordinates: 40°08′4.73″N 74°26′30.99″W
- Status: Operating
- Opening date: June 3, 1996
- Cost: $5 million

General statistics
- Type: Steel – Enclosed
- Manufacturer: Intamin
- Model: Indoor Roller Coaster
- Track layout: steel twister
- Lift/launch system: Drive tire lift hill
- Height: 40.5 ft (12.3 m)
- Drop: 37 ft (11 m)
- Length: 1,377 ft (420 m)
- Speed: 33 mph (53 km/h)
- Inversions: 0
- Duration: 1:24
- Capacity: 1596 riders per hour
- G-force: 2.3
- Height restriction: 44 in (112 cm)
- Trains: 3 trains with 7 cars. Riders are arranged 2 across in 2 rows for a total of 28 riders per train.
- Fast Lane available
- Skull Mountain at RCDB

Skull Mountain is an enclosed roller coaster located at Six Flags Great Adventure in Jackson Township, New Jersey. Designed and manufactured by Intamin, the ride opened to the public on June 3, 1996.

== Ride experience ==
After ascending the first lift hill, the train travels around the front facade of the enclosure to ascend the second lift hill. The first drop is the ride's only steep drop, while the rest of the ride contains three horizontal helices.

The building is punctuated by strobe lights and sound effects play over a tribal or heavy metal music score. Occasionally, ride operators will operate Skull Mountain with the interior lights illuminated. On hot summer days, the park turns on the ride's exterior waterfall, which falls from the exterior skull's eyes. It pours down into the water below, wetting guests in the ride's queue.

While most of the park's coasters will operate in light rain, Skull Mountain remains open during thunderstorms, since it is enclosed. It will be closed only if the thunderstorm is severe.

Skull Mountain was opened in 1996 and is one of three roller coasters at the park with a 44-inch (1,100 mm) height requirement and requires a child to be accompanied by an adult (effective since 2012). To ride alone, guests must be 48-inch (1,200 mm). The height limit of the ride is 41.5 feet (12.6 m).

== Ride Overlays ==
=== Fright Fest ===
The only additions during the Fright Fest Halloween event are a few pumpkin figures, and the atmospheric lighting is turned off.

=== Holiday in the Park ===
During the first three seasons of Holiday in the Park, a Christmas event at the park, the ride's name was changed temporarily to "Poinsettia Peak". The ride received a new sign and the exterior of the attraction was decorated in strands of red string lights.

During the 2018 season, this overlay was not seen. Although, the name of the area surrounding it was named "Poinsettia Peak".

The only remaining theming from this addition in the 2018 season are a few red flood lights pointed at the attraction.
