= Harley Quinn Crazy Train =

Steel roller coaster

- Previously known as Blackbeard's Lost Treasure Train (1999–2015)
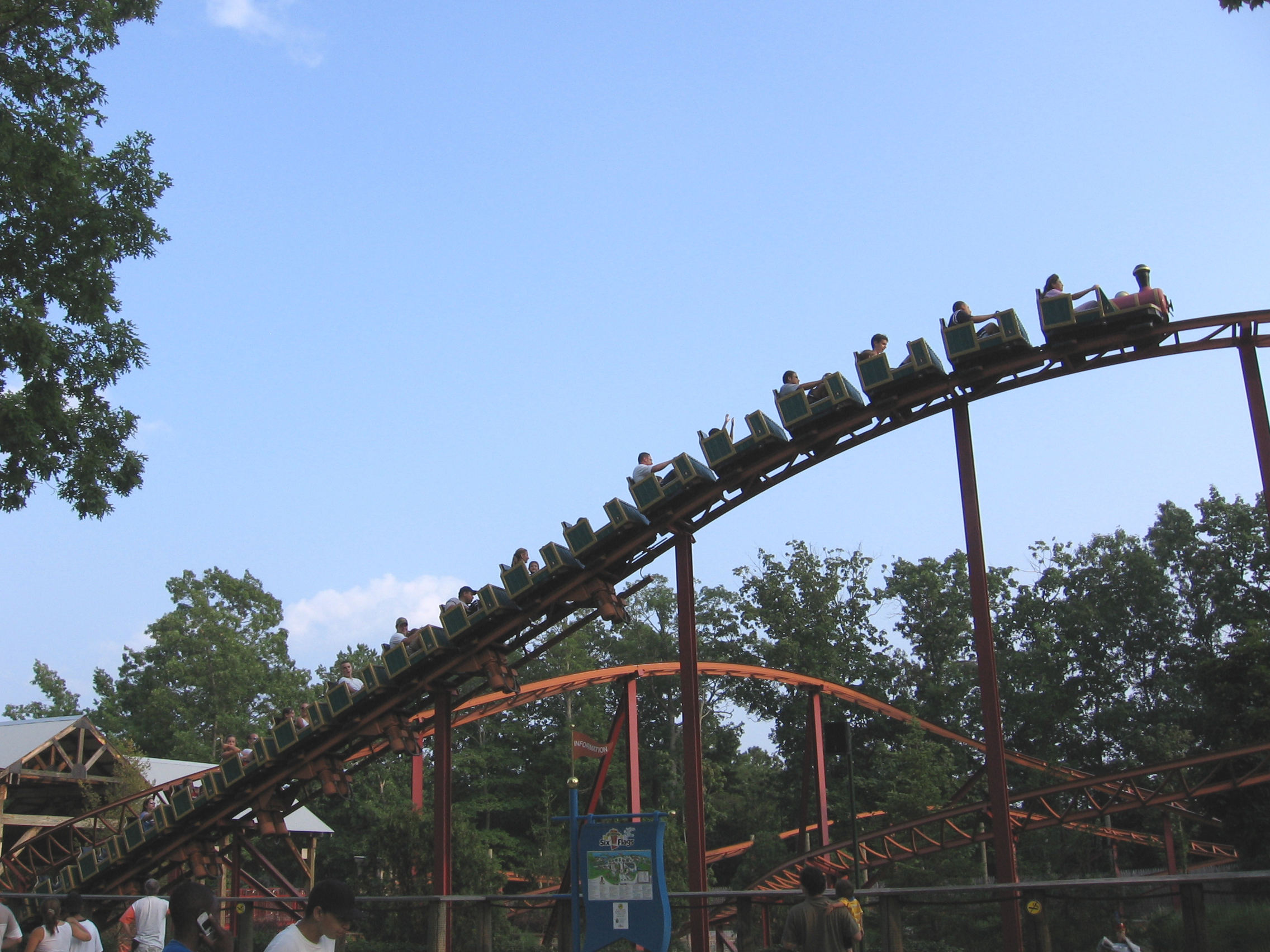
- The long train climbing the lift

Six Flags Great Adventure
- Location: Six Flags Great Adventure
- Park section: Lakefront
- Coordinates: 40°8′5.38″N 74°26′23.07″W
- Status: Operating
- Opening date: 1999

General statistics
- Type: Steel – Junior
- Manufacturer: Zierer
- Designer: Werner Stengel
- Model: Tivoli - Large
- Track layout: Double Figure Eight
- Lift/launch system: Drive tire lift hill
- Height: 26.3 ft (8.0 m)
- Length: 1,181.1 ft (360.0 m)
- Speed: 22.4 mph (36.0 km/h)
- Inversions: 0
- Duration: 1:05
- Capacity: 1,250 riders per hour
- Height restriction: 41 in (104 cm)
- Trains: Single train with 20 cars; riders arranged 2 across in a single row for a total of 40 riders per train
- Fast Lane available
- Harley Quinn Crazy Train at RCDB

Harley Quinn Crazy Train (previously Blackbeard's Lost Treasure Train) is a steel roller coaster located at Six Flags Great Adventure in Jackson Township, New Jersey, themed to the DC Comics character Harley Quinn. It was manufactured by Zierer and opened in 1999, classified as a junior roller coaster. It is a smaller, family-oriented coaster. It is considered a junior coaster rather than a kiddie coaster, as adults can ride without a child and the restraints are slightly larger than that of a children's roller coaster.

Harley Quinn Crazy Train has a single 20-car train, by far the longest in the park. Each car has a single row of two seats for a total of 40 riders. It also has one of the longest stations in the park, with an individual entrance gate for every row except the first (the operator panel and computer shed are in the way). Because there is only one train, no block safety system is needed and the station also serves as the main brake run. In the early 2007 season, it was reprogrammed to complete two circuits of the track in each cycle. It makes two loops around a figure-8 track.
