= Jersey Devil Coaster =

Roller coaster in Jackson, New Jersey

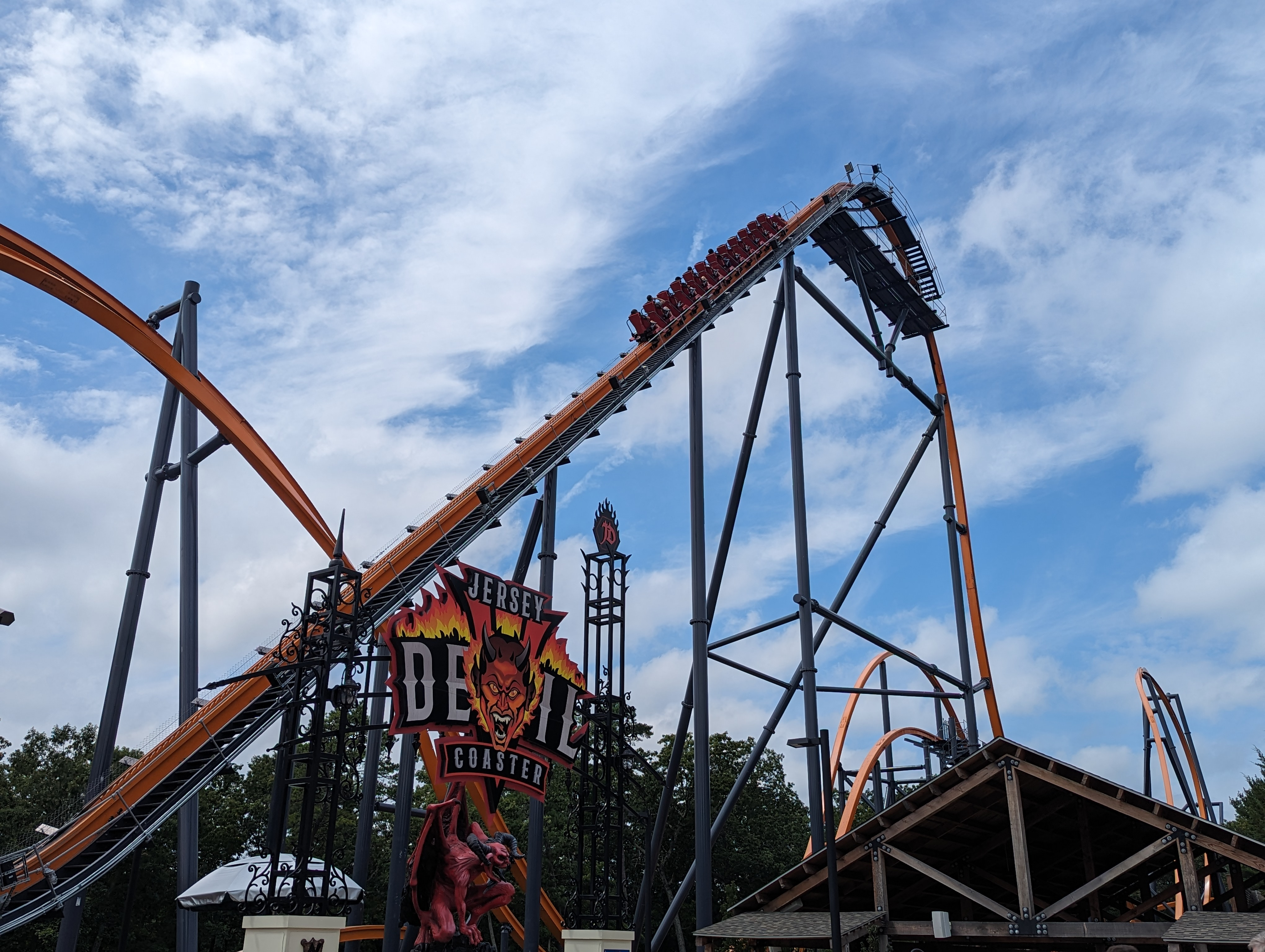

Six Flags Great Adventure
- Location: Six Flags Great Adventure
- Park section: The Pine Barrens
- Coordinates: 40.1377°N 74.4405°W
- Status: Operating
- Soft opening date: June 9, 2021
- Opening date: June 13, 2021
- Replaced: Road Runner Railway

General statistics
- Type: Steel – Single-rail
- Manufacturer: Rocky Mountain Construction
- Designer: Alan Schilke
- Model: Raptor Track
- Track layout: Custom
- Lift/launch system: Chain lift hill
- Height: 130 ft (40 m)
- Drop: 122 ft (37 m)
- Length: 3,000 ft (910 m)
- Speed: 58 mph (93 km/h)
- Inversions: 3
- Max vertical angle: 87°
- Height restriction: 48 in (122 cm)
- Trains: 4 trains with 12 cars. Riders are arranged 1 across in a single row for a total of 12 riders per train.
- Fast Lane available
- Jersey Devil Coaster at RCDB

The Jersey Devil Coaster is a single-rail roller coaster located at Six Flags Great Adventure in Jackson Township, New Jersey. The roller coaster was built by Rocky Mountain Construction (RMC). It is themed to the Jersey Devil, a mythical creature rumored to live in the New Jersey Pine Barrens. The roller coaster is 3,000 feet (910 m) long and contains a 130-foot (40 m)-tall lift hill and three inversions. The Jersey Devil Coaster uses four trains, each containing 12 seats, which achieve a maximum speed of 58 miles per hour (93 km/h).

Announced in 2019, the ride was originally scheduled for completion in 2020. Due to the COVID-19 pandemic in the United States, it was delayed by one year, opening to the public on June 13, 2021.

== History ==
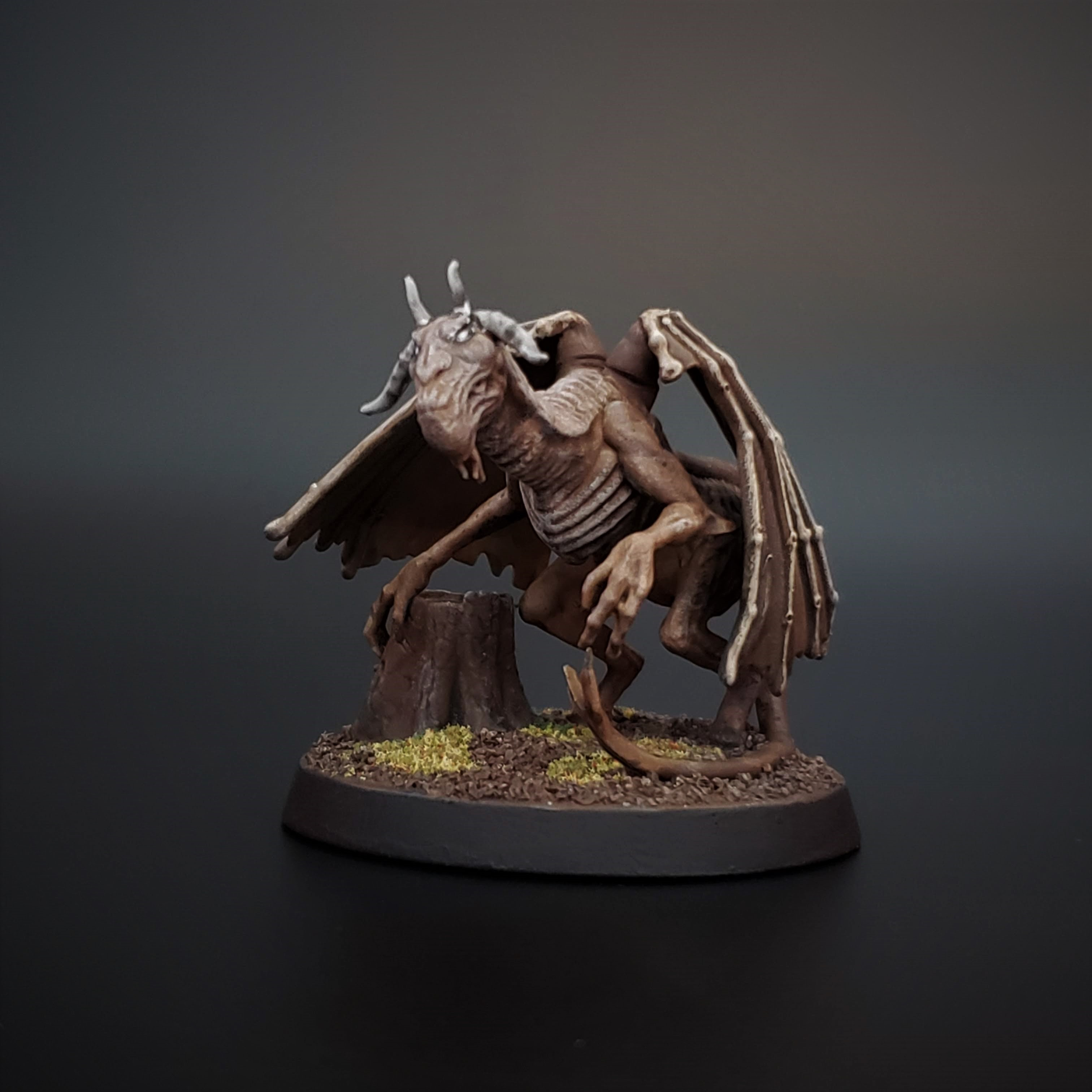
A depiction of the Jersey Devil from where the ride obtains its namesake (from the board game Fearsome Wilderness)

On August 29, 2019, Six Flags Great Adventure announced that the Jersey Devil Coaster would be constructed for the park's 2020 season, replacing the former Looney Tunes Seaport area of the park. USA Today listed Jersey Devil Coaster as one of the 10 most anticipated new roller coasters for the 2020 season.

Because of the COVID-19 pandemic in the United States, Six Flags suspended all operations on March 13, 2020. The following month, Six Flags announced that, to reduce its financial losses during the pandemic, it would defer numerous capital projects that had been scheduled for its parks during the 2020 season. Although Six Flags Great Adventure resumed operations on July 3, 2020, the park announced in June that the opening of the Jersey Devil Coaster had been delayed to the 2021 season. Many parts for the roller coaster were delayed because of manufacturing slowdowns caused by the pandemic.

The park resumed construction on the coaster in late December 2020. The following month, on January 25, 2021, the final piece of track was installed at a topping out ceremony. The roller coaster's chain lift, ride controls, and trains had yet to be installed at the time, and Six Flags also had to obtain permits from New Jersey government officials. Six Flags Great Adventure conducted its first test runs in late May 2021, simulating the weights of passengers using water-filled dummies. The ride was formally opened to the public on June 13, 2021, following a preview event for the media on June 10. It was the park's first new roller coaster since the Joker, which had opened five years prior.

== Characteristics ==
The roller coaster is 3,000 feet (910 m) long and achieves a maximum speed of 58 miles per hour (93 km/h). The ride uses RMC's single-rail I-beam Raptor Track, manufactured by TCN & Co. of Marlton, New Jersey. The track is painted orange-yellow. According to Michael Reitz, an engineer for Six Flags, the Raptor Track is sturdier than conventional roller coaster track; as such, the ride requires relatively few supports. The Jersey Devil Coaster contains three inversions: a dive loop (described as a raven drop), zero-g stall, and zero-g roll.

The Jersey Devil Coaster uses four trains, each containing 12 rows, with one passenger per row. Riders sit on low seats in a single-file arrangement, placing their legs on either side of the track. The trains are painted red and are themed to a devil. The front car of each train contains a depiction of the Jersey Devil's head; the devil represents the train's 13th "passenger", evoking the negative connotations of the number 13. Other references to the number 13 include the ride's 13-story height, its formal opening date, and the fact that the Jersey Devil Coaster was the 13th coaster in operation at Six Flags Great Adventure.

The entrance to the Jersey Devil Coaster's station is through a themed portal. There is a large statue of the Jersey Devil within the queue line; this statue had been built for the El Diablo ride at the same park, which operated between 2015 and 2017. The statue depicts a red demon with red eyes and horns, squatting atop a boulder. In addition, the queue line contains signboards describing the Jersey Devil's backstory.

== Ride experience ==
After going up the 130-foot (40 m) tall lift hill, the train goes down a 87° drop. This leads into a dive loop and then an airtime hill with 180° stall. The train next goes up into a turnaround, which drops down into a zero-G roll. After a mid-course brake run, the train travels over a few airtime hills, before fully braking at the end and turning around to go back into the station.

== Critical reception ==
When the roller coaster opened, Jeremy Schneider of NJ.com wrote: "It's safe to say the Jersey Devil Coaster is among the park's best. [...] The uniqueness of the layout, the utter smoothness of the ride and the Jersey of it all make this ride worth the inevitable long line." A reporter for CNN wrote: "This coaster doesn't linger at the top at all... Within seconds of the [first] drop, you're already back up the next hill and being thrown into a mind-bending series of inversions, twists and more hills as the single track snakes in and out of itself." A writer for Attractions Magazine said that, rather than being the tallest, fastest, or most intense roller coaster at Six Flags Great Adventure, "the Jersey Devil offers a perfect balance between incredibly exciting moments and fun twists, turns, and hills."

== See also ==
- 2021 in amusement parks
