= Six Flags Great Adventure =

Amusement park in Jackson, New Jersey

Six Flags Great Adventure Resort
- Previously known as Great Adventure (1974–1977)
- Logo used since 2025

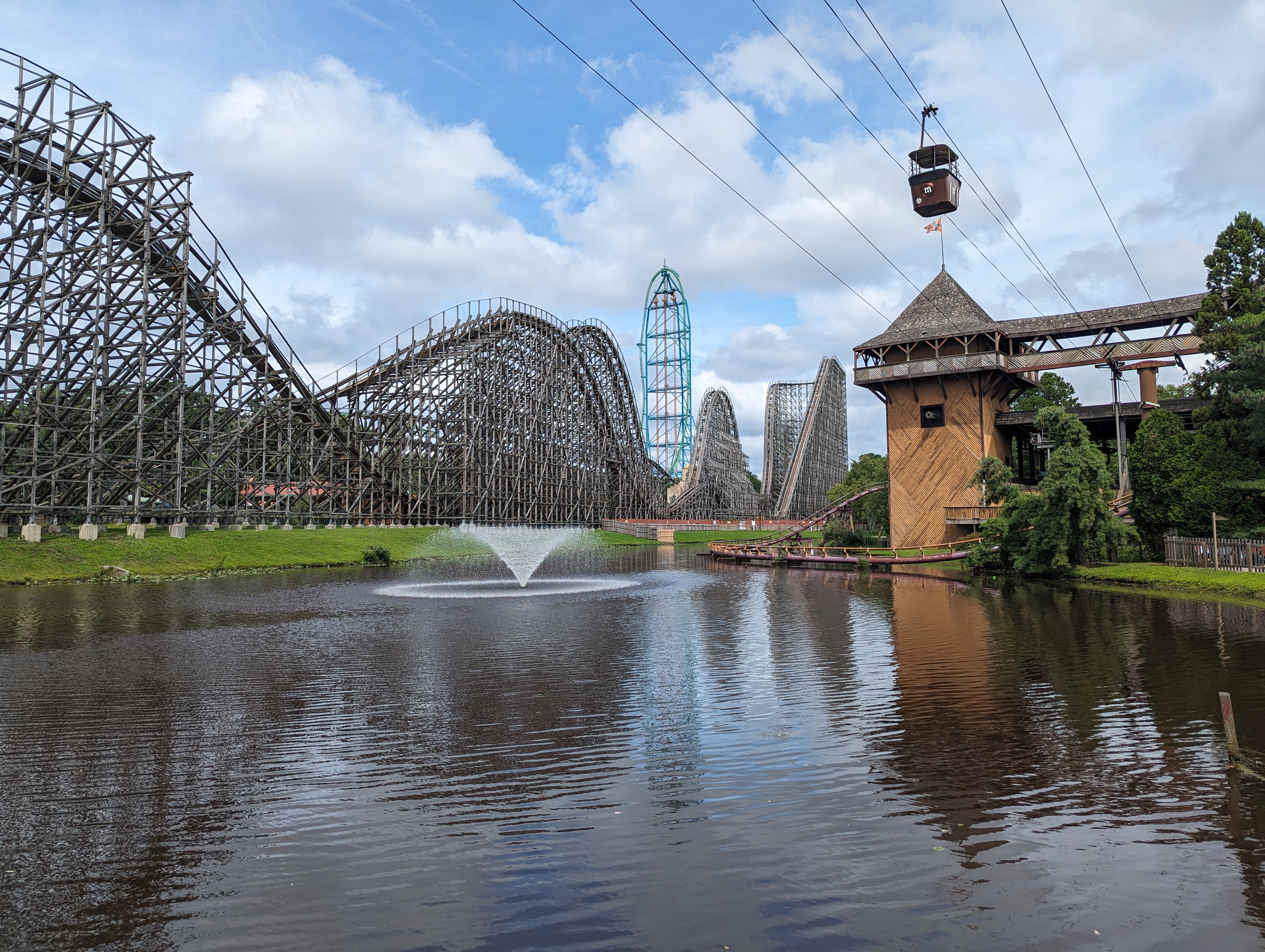
- Interactive map of Six Flags Great Adventure Resort
- Location: Jackson, New Jersey, United States
- Coordinates: 40°8′15″N 74°26′24″W
- Status: Operating
- Opened: July 1, 1974; 52 years ago
- Owner: Six Flags
- Park president: Mike Fehnel
- Slogan: "The World's Ultimate Thrill Park" "Three Parks, One Great Adventure"
- Operating season: March to December
- Attendance: ▲2.5 million in 2023 (Note: TEA did not report attendance figures in 2024 because the park did not rank in the top 20 most attended North American parks.)
- Area: 160 acres (65 ha)

Attractions
- Total: 47 (as of 2026)
- Roller coasters: 14
- Water rides: 2
- Website: Six Flags Great Adventure

Six Flags Great Adventure (also known as Six Flags Great Adventure Resort) is a 510-acre (210 ha) amusement park and resort complex in Jackson Township, Ocean County, New Jersey, between New York City and Philadelphia. Owned and operated by Six Flags, it includes an amusement park, a water park named Hurricane Harbor New Jersey, a safari park named Wild Safari Adventure, and a glamping resort named Savannah Sunset Resort and Spa. The park is located adjacent to Interstate 195, along Monmouth Road (County Route 537).

The complex first opened to the public in 1974 as simply Great Adventure, under the direction of restaurateur Warner LeRoy. The park was acquired by Six Flags in 1977. Hurricane Harbor New Jersey, an adjacent water park, was opened and added to Great Adventure in 2000. In 2012, Six Flags combined its 160-acre (65 ha) Great Adventure park with its 350-acre (140 ha) Wild Safari animal park to form Six Flags Great Adventure & Safari. The park is now the second-largest theme park in the world, following Disney's Animal Kingdom.

== History ==
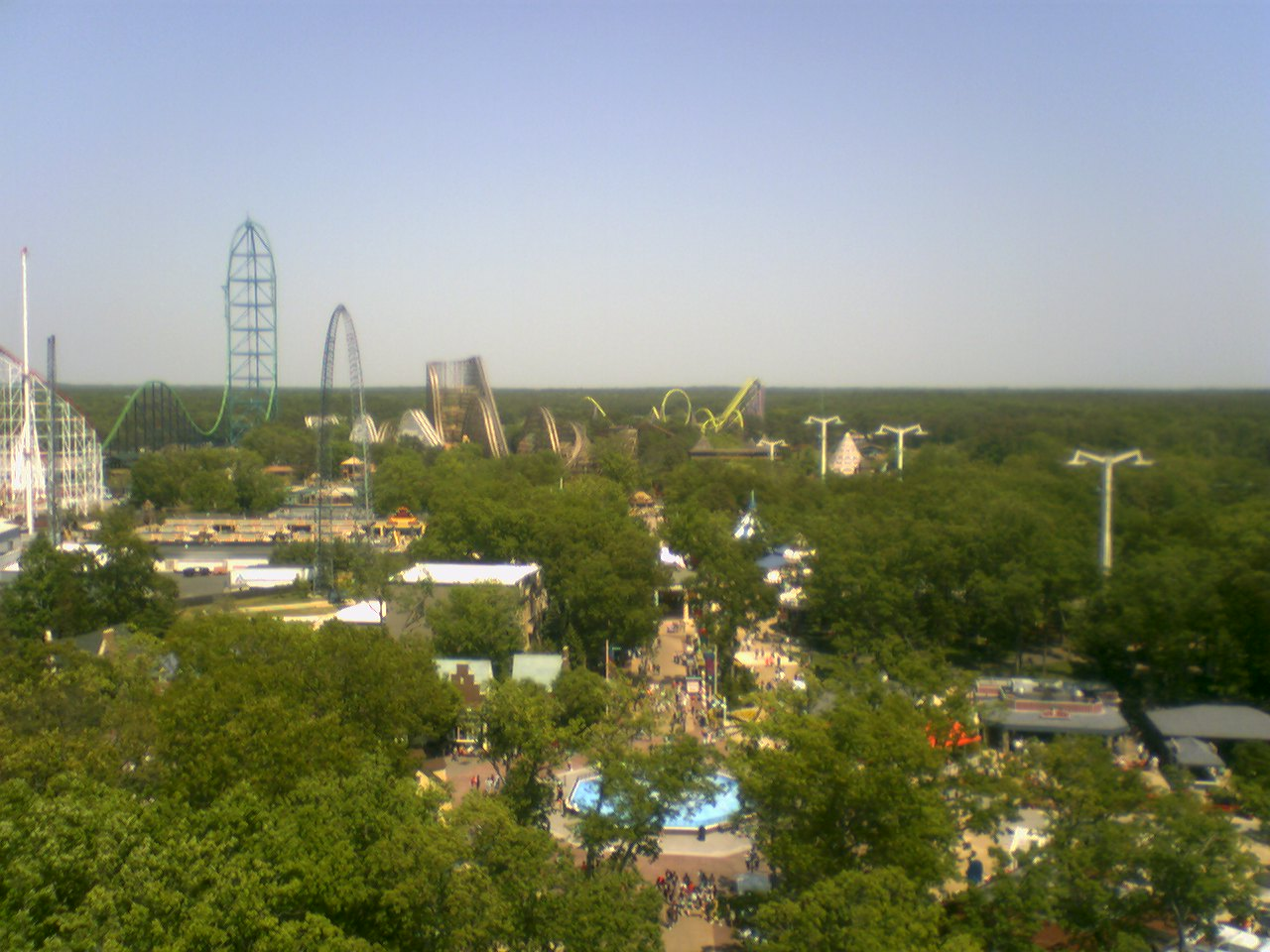
View overlooking the park facing east, taken from the top of the Big Wheel (2007)

=== Warner LeRoy era (1974–1977) ===
In 1972, entrepreneurial businessman Warner LeRoy developed concept plans for the Great Adventure entertainment complex, proposing seven parks be built within the complex: an amusement park, a safari park, a stage show and performance venue, a floral park, a sports complex, a shopping district, and a campground with a beach/water park and stables. His proposal also included plans for hotels, which were connected to the parks and could be reached by boats, buses, a sky ride and/or a monorail. LeRoy wanted his parks to flow naturally through the forest and lakes, capitalizing on the back-to-nature movement of the era. He chose a property in Ocean County, New Jersey which was then owned by the Switlik family, in an area centrally located between the New York City and Philadelphia metropolitan areas. The property on County Route 537 had easy access to the newly constructed Interstate 195, which connected Central New Jersey to the New Jersey Turnpike (Interstate 95) and would eventually (in 1981) connect to the Garden State Parkway.

Since the park's opening, it has been served by its own in-house emergency services, consisting of the Fire Department (Ocean County Station 58) and Emergency Medical Service (Ocean County Squad 80). LeRoy collaborated with Hardwicke Industries, who had previously built safari parks in Canada and Europe. Together, they set out to open the seven parks in stages over a five-year period. After a 4,500-guest invitation-only soft opening on June 30, 1974, the Great Adventure entertainment complex opened to the general public on July 1, 1974. The total cost to build the park had been about $10 million. At the time of the opening, only the Enchanted Forest area and Safari Park were operational, with elements from five of the other planned parks being used to create the Enchanted Forest.

The Enchanted Forest was designed and built to look bigger-than-life. The Big Balloon was a tethered hot-air balloon that loomed over the park's entrance and was the biggest of its kind in the world. The Log Flume was the longest log ride constructed in the world at that time and was accompanied by a giant "Conestoga Wagon", an over-sized log cabin restaurant called "Best of the West" and a huge Western Fortress, in the park's Rootin' Tootin' Rip Roarin' section. The Giant Wheel (now Big Wheel), then the tallest Ferris wheel in the world, and the Freedom Fountain, then the largest spraying fountain in the world, were located at the opposite end of the park. One of the few smaller-than-real-life attractions was an outdoor walk-through attraction called the Garden of Marvels. It used working G-scale (o-g scale) LGB trains and boats among models of American landmarks and 1/25-scale recreations of European castles.

Another view from the top of the Big Wheel facing northeast (2007). Coasters from left to right: Superman: Ultimate Flight, Great American Scream Machine (defunct), Kingda Ka (defunct), Rolling Thunder (defunct), El Toro, and Medusa.

This miniature village was an idea taken from LeRoy's proposed Over the Rainbow floral park. A tree filled with snakes, a carousel, antique cars, koi pond, children's playground (called Kiddie Kingdom), petting zoo (named Happy Feeling) and a restaurant named Gingerbread Fancy (now Granny's Country Kitchen) were also borrowed from the floral park concept to create a section of the Enchanted Forest. This section created the park's main midway named Dream Street.

Shoppe Lane was named after a proposed "shopping extravaganza" park, which LeRoy had designed for the property. It lent its large open squares, huge fountain (Main Street Fountain), street performers (clowns and stilt walkers) and shops to the Enchanted Forest. Fairy Tales was the name of a shop that opened with the park in one of the over-sized bazaar tents. It sold stuffed animals and toys, including Superman merchandise. Other influences from LeRoy's proposal would surface in the years to come.

Neptune's Kingdom was a concept for a lakeside aquatic show park. From its design came Aqua Spectacle, which featured dolphin performances and high dive shows. Later called Fort Independence, the venue stood from 1974 until its demolition in 2015. Neptune's Kingdom was designed to run the length from Runaway Mine Train to Northern Star Arena, but most of its influences appear in the park's Lakefront area.

Rootin' Tootin' opened with Runaway Mine Train on the grand opening on Independence Day. A small compact coaster named Big Fury opened later in the season. The Skyride connected two ends of the park with stations in Rootin' Tootin' and Dream Street. The double skyway ran originally at the 1964–1965 New York World's Fair. The Great Train Ride was a small train ride that brought guests through a loop of the woods, rather than to a destination of another gate. A small handful of spin rides were located in the Strawberry Fair section.

The Fun Fair area debuted in 1975 with several new spinning rides, a smaller Ferris wheel, and a Schwarzkopf Jumbo Jet roller coaster. The coaster never opened and was removed at the end of the season. A second flume called the Moon Flume was built by Arrow Dynamics to ease crowds on the Log Flume. It was built on the opposite end of the park and the station turntable is used for the stage of the Wiggles show today. The Fortune Festival was a new game section that was located where the Boardwalk section exists today.

LeRoy's original vision for the amusement park featured many dark rides. Although Man, Time and Space, The Keystone Cops and (Alice) Down the Wishing Well (among others) never came to be, the Haunted Castle Across the Moat, which was added a few years later, took its cue from the rooms and monsters of the Hotel Transylvania.

In the early 1980s, the park's entrance was moved to a new central location, which is still in use today. It was designed with an outer mall called Liberty Court, and its Federal style architecture was influenced by the celebration of the United States Bicentennial. An inner mall called Avenue of States was adorned by fifty state flags in the central corridor. Six flags remain on Main Street today. The name Enchanted Forest was changed to Great Adventure, by which name the park complex is still known today. The Strawberry Fair and Fun Fair names were discontinued and the attractions in these areas became part of the newly named Enchanted Forest section. More spin rides, "yummy yummy" food, shows, games and the Safari became a part of "the greatest day of your life". The park became a major attraction with dozens of rides, shows, and several steel roller coasters. The Big Balloon, Happy Kid Ride, The Gondola, Pretty Monster, and Super Cat were the first attractions to be removed from the park before new ownership made big changes.

=== Penn Central / Bally's / Westray Capital era (1977–1992) ===
In 1977, construction began on a steel looping shuttle coaster called Lightnin' Loops, which was removed in 1992. In late 1977, however, the park was purchased by Six Flags, a regional theme park company then owned by Penn Central, which had large stakes in the Philadelphia and New York City regions. Six Flags added rides found in bigger theme parks such as the wooden coaster Rolling Thunder in 1979, The Buccaneer (a swinging ship from Intamin), Roaring Rapids (now Congo Rapids, an Intamin river rapids ride), Parachuter's Perch (now Parachute Training Center: Edwards AFB Jump Tower, an Intamin parachute ride) and Freefall (later Stuntman's Freefall, an Intamin first-generation freefall), all before the park's tenth anniversary.

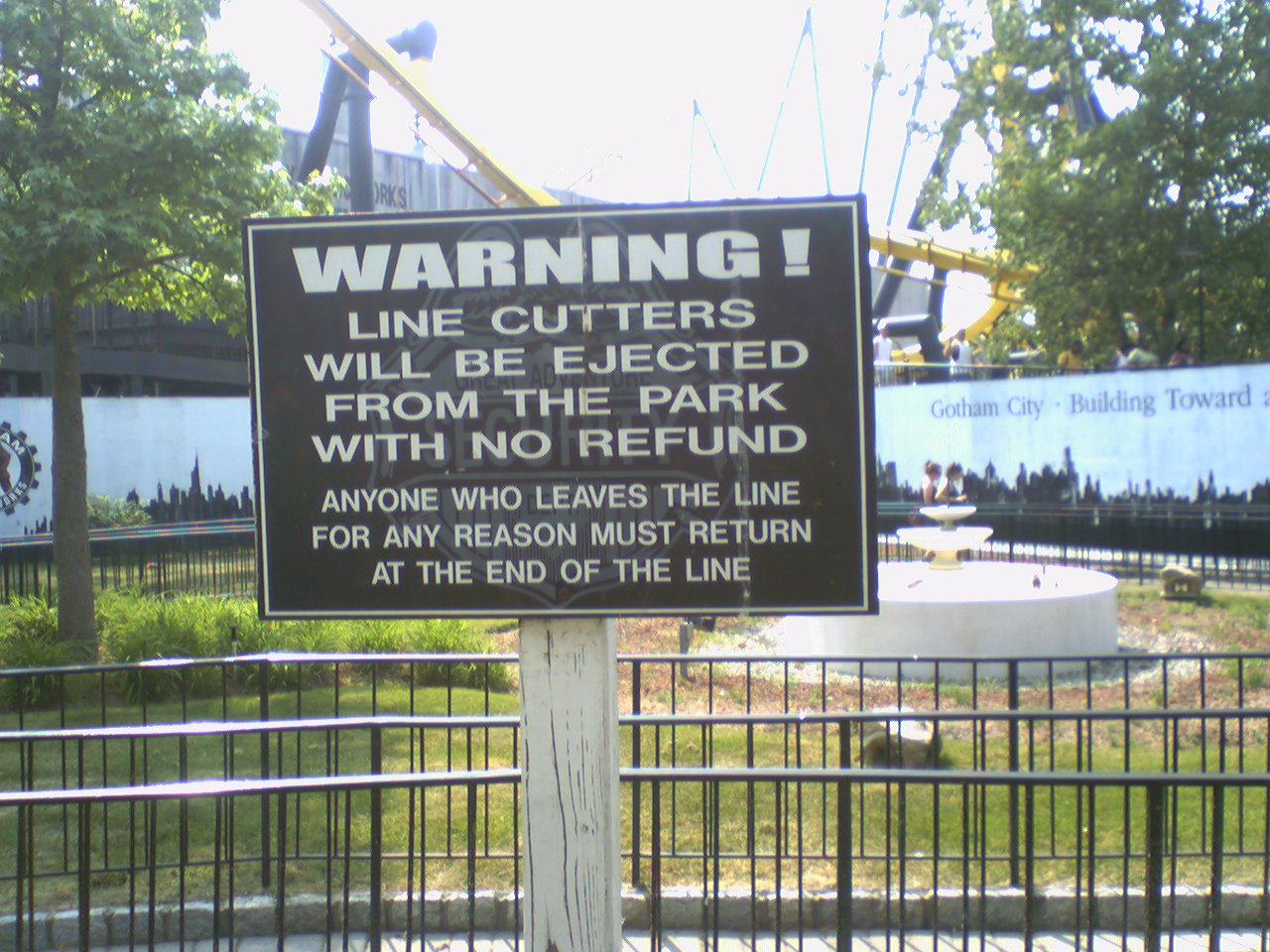
A sign warning guests not to cut “lines”

1980 saw very few changes. In 1981, the park added a water ride called Roaring Rapids (now Congo River Rapids), in 1983 a freefall ride, and in 1984 a roller coaster called the Sarajevo Bobsleds. Also in 1984 the park closed and removed Lil' Thunder, a kiddie coaster, keeping the total coaster count to four.

Eight teenagers, including four students and one graduate of Franklin K. Lane High School, lost their lives in a fire at the Haunted Castle on May 11, 1984, sparking controversy over the safety of such attractions. After the incident, new fire safety laws were passed for amusement park fun houses and dark rides.

1986 saw the addition of a second looping coaster and the park's fifth roller coaster, Ultra Twister, a design known for its spiral inline twists. The ride was built next to Rolling Thunder, partially taking away the area's western theme. Another water ride called Splashwater Falls (which became Movietown Water Effect in 1992 and has since been removed) was added in which riders rode in a large boat that was pulled uphill and then down a steep waterfall, soaking riders. The new addition was made after attendance at the park had lowered following the Haunted Castle fire, and the park realized new additions were needed to keep the park alive.

Attendance dropped even further when an accident occurred on the Lightnin' Loops roller coaster in 1987. A teenage girl was thrown from the train because she was seated on the wrong side of the shoulder restraint. After the accident, new safety features were added not only to Great Adventure's roller coasters but also to roller coasters around the world. Once again, Great Adventure set both a bad and later a good example for the amusement park world. However, the accident caused the park's attendance to drop. Attendance was so low, in fact, that in 1987 rumors began to spread that the park would close in a few years. At the end of the season, the park was slated to get a new multiple looping coaster, but by the end of the year it was decided that Six Flags Great America would get the coaster instead, since Great Adventure was not seen as a good investment. At the end of 1988, the park was about to lose its license to sell food, and attendance was so low park management realized a big new addition was necessary.

In the spring of 1988, it was announced that the park would indeed get a new coaster. Sarajevo Bobsleds was removed to make room for The Great American Scream Machine, which opened in April 1989. This coaster had multiple loops and for a month was the tallest roller coaster in the world and brought the park back to a total of five roller coasters. The Scream Machine was removed in 2010 to make room for the new Green Lantern stand-up coaster.

In 1990, as part of a ride rotation program, a stand-up looping coaster called Shockwave was added to the park. Shockwave had previously operated at Six Flags Magic Mountain. However, Ultra Twister was removed at the end of 1989 and sent to Six Flags Astroworld for the 1991 season, keeping the park's coaster count at five. In 1991, the park added a huge complex of "dry" waterslides. While guests got wet on them, they could ride these with regular clothes or swimsuits. These slides were themed after the rivers of the world. Roaring Rapids, as well as the second flume ride in the park, were incorporated into this complex. Roaring Rapids became Congo Rapids, and the Hydro Flume became Irrawaddy Riptide.

=== Time Warner era (1990–1997) ===
In 1990, Time Warner acquired a 19.5% stake in Six Flags, then by the end of 1991 acquired an additional 30.5%, giving them 50% ownership of the corporation, with the remainder divided equally by silent partners, The Blackstone Group and Wertheim Schroder. Time Warner used the opportunity to advertise and promote their movies through the Six Flags parks. Time Warner purchased the remaining 50% in 1993, then in 1995 sold 51% of the corporation to Boston Ventures. Time Warner, however, continued to manage the parks through 1997.

In 1992, the eastern area or Fun Fair area of the park was re-themed as Action Town and then as Movietown in 1993. A Batman stunt show was added and the announcement that a new inverted looping roller coaster called Batman The Ride would be added. Lightnin' Loops opened for the first half of the season but was disassembled at the end of July to begin construction of Batman. That coaster was sold to Premier Parks, which at the time was a different company than Six Flags (but would eventually buy Six Flags). Premier Parks put one of the Lightnin' Loops tracks in Frontier City located in Oklahoma City and it still operates today. Premier Parks put the other Lightnin' Loops track in their park in Largo, Maryland (near Washington, DC), then called Adventure World. That track was renamed the Python, which would be removed in 1999. At the end of 1992, the roller coaster Shockwave was removed as part of the "Ride Rotation Program" of Six Flags. Shockwave would be sent to Six Flags Astroworld and would reopen there in 1993 as Batman The Escape. So by the end of 1992, the park was down to just three coasters.

Batman, designed by Bolliger & Mabillard, opened in the spring of 1993 bringing the coaster count back up to four. In 1994, a motion simulator theatre ride was added. Initially, it was an airplane flying themed attraction but has since been changed to a Halloween theme in the fall over the years. A dinosaur theme and a three-dimensional dinosaur theme was also used for this attraction. For several years, it operated as SpongeBob the ride and then as Fly Me To The Moon. For the 2010 season, the attraction did not run and that building remained vacant for future use.

1995 saw the addition of Viper, a steel spiral looping roller coaster similar to Ultra Twister and in Ultra Twister's old spot, bringing the coaster count to five again. 1996 saw the addition of an indoor themed junior roller coaster called Skull Mountain. In 1997, a multiple looping dual track shuttle coaster called Batman & Robin: The Chiller was built but only opened for a day and encountered more technical difficulties. This coaster ended up not opening again until the spring of 1998. This coaster ran rather rough and was referred to as a "headbanger" as was Viper and to a lesser extent The Scream Machine. The Mine Train and Rolling Thunder were also rough rides by then. Also, many flat rides were removed over the years and the park was showing signs of wear and tear, as well as obsolete attractions.

=== Premier era (1998–2005) ===
Premier Parks purchased Six Flags from Time Warner and Boston Ventures on April 1, 1998. The following year, the new management team added a dozen flat rides to the park and declared a "war on lines". The Adventure River complex was retired but the flume ride and the Congo Rapids remained. A kiddie water play area also remained as part of a new kiddie ride area called Looney Tunes Seaport. A junior roller coaster called Blackbeard's Lost Treasure Train (now known as Harley Quinn Crazy Train) as well as a kiddie roller coaster called Road Runner Railway were also added, but the star attraction was a floorless steel multiple looping roller coaster called Medusa.

No changes were made at the park in 2000, but across the property on a separate parking lot, a water park named Hurricane Harbor New Jersey was built and opened at the end of May. This was also separately gated and charges a separate admission from Great Adventure. The park consists of a dozen waterslides, a kiddie water play area, and a wavepool.

In 2001, the park added another state of the art roller coaster called Nitro. Viper would not operate at all throughout the 2001 season due to increased complaints of roughness and frequent technical issues. While Viper sat dormant that year, the Robin side of Batman & Robin: The Chiller had its trains updated with lap bars, making it a smoother ride. The Batman side would receive this upgrade a year later in 2002. In 2003, Superman: Ultimate Flight was added. Exact models of this are found at Six Flags Over Georgia and Six Flags Great America. In 2004, new harnesses were added to the Runaway Mine Train and the up-charge attraction erUPtion was added to the Boardwalk.

In 2005, the park added the world's tallest coaster called Kingda Ka and also dismantled Viper. With the addition of Kingda Ka, the season pass holders entrance to the park was closed because Kingda Ka's footprint went right over it. A new children's play area called Balin's Jungleland was also added. In 2006, a wooden twister coaster called El Toro was added in the spot formerly occupied by Viper, along with a new themed area, and another kiddie ride area to replace Bugs Bunny Land which was retired at the end of 2004.

=== Shapiro era (2006–2010) ===
At the end of 2005, a proxy battle resulted in two major stockholders assuming control of the Six Flags Board. The Premier Group was ousted in December and the new board appointed Mark Shapiro as CEO. In 2007, the park added Wiggles World and removed Batman & Robin: The Chiller. The rolls were replaced with banked hills to enhance ride performance. However, the ride closed forever on June 28 due to technical problems with the ride. Disassembling occurred that September. In addition, the path leading to Chiller was blocked off and several rides including Freefall, Splashwater Falls/Movietown Water Effect, and a couple other flat rides were removed.

In 2008, in the area occupied by the Movietown Water Effect, a new junior indoor Wild Mouse rollercoaster was added called The Dark Knight. Motion Simulator Ride ended the SpongeBob theming in favor of Fly Me To The Moon. Also Glow in the Park Parade was added to the entertainment lineup.

Medusa was refurbished over the off-season and returned in 2009 as "Bizarro", a new incarnation of the same ride. The whole coaster, station, and surrounding theme elements were all changed and repainted to go with the new theme of the ride. Bizarro comic strips were put up along the queue line, and special effects and audio were added to the actual ride. The refurbishment brought crowds back to a ride that was beginning to lose its original charm and popularity.

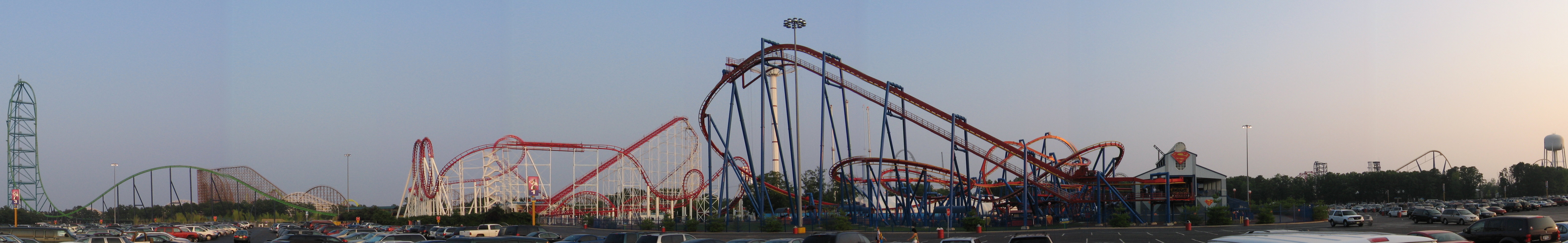
Panorama of Great Adventure's skyline in 2006. From left to right: the now-defunct Kingda Ka, El Toro, Medusa (visible in full size picture), the now-defunct Rolling Thunder, the now defunct Great American Scream Machine, Superman: Ultimate Flight, the now defunct Batman & Robin: The Chiller and Stuntman's Freefall, and operating Nitro.

=== Weber/Anderson era (2010–2019) ===
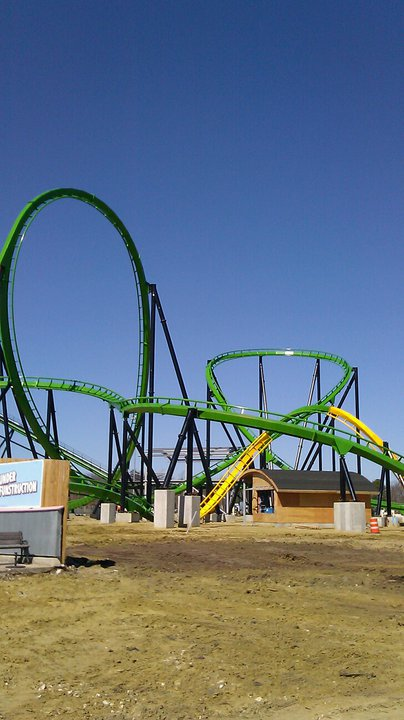
The now-defunct Green Lantern under construction in 2011, the coaster had previously operated at Six Flags Kentucky Kingdom

The theme park's parent Six Flags emerged from a 2008–2010 bankruptcy with Al Weber Jr. as an interim CEO and subsequently by Jim Reid-Anderson in August 2010. The company parent also moved its corporate headquarters from New York City back to Texas, where the company started.

For the 2010 season, the Motion Simulator ride Fly Me To The Moon did not reopen and was not replaced with anything and remained vacant. In April 2010, rumors also began that the Great American Scream Machine would be removed at the end of the season. By mid-June, rumors were that the coaster would be removed on July 1. That date came and went but on July 5, 2010, via Facebook, Six Flags confirmed the rumored removal of the Great American Scream Machine on July 18, 2010. The ride closed late on that date and was demolished immediately after to make room for "a major new attraction in 2011." On September 16, 2010, the park announced that the Green Lantern, a standup roller coaster formerly known as Chang at the recently closed Six Flags Kentucky Kingdom, would debut in the Boardwalk section for the 2011 season. Green Lantern's lift hill and first drop run parallel to the lift hill of Superman Ultimate Flight, which involved the demolition of a rarely used section of the preferred parking area.

In late 2010, Six Flags began the process of removing licensed theming from attractions. They terminated several licenses including their license with The Wiggles. Wiggles' World was renamed and rethemed to Safari Kids in time for the 2011 season. Also in 2011, eruption was removed. Construction for the new Funtime Slingshot replacing eruption started mid-June 2011 and was recently finished a few weeks after.

In 2012, Great Adventure introduced SkyScreamer, a 242-foot-tall (74 m) Funtime StarFlyer, that soars riders in a 98-foot (30 m) circle at speeds over 43 miles per hour (69 km/h), that opened in the spring of 2012, along with bumper cars, flying elephants, and a musical themed scrambler that opened in the newly transformed area Adventure Alley (formerly Fantasy Forest area around the Big Wheel). Furthermore, in 2012, Six Flags Great Adventure removed two of its four Johnny Rockets food stands, one located in Plaza Del Carnival and the other in the Boardwalk. Both were replaced with a new food stand named Totally Kickin' Chicken.

On August 30, 2012, Six Flags combined its 125-acre (51 ha) Great Adventure Park with its 350-acre (140 ha) Wild Safari animal park to form the 510-acre (210 ha) Six Flags Great Adventure & Safari park, the second-largest theme park in the world, after Disney's Animal Kingdom.

A 4th Dimension roller coaster was opened in spring 2016, called The Joker.

In 2017, Six Flags added Justice League: Battle For Metropolis a 4D dark ride.

The ride Cyborg Cyber Spin opened in spring of 2018.

Wonder Woman: Lasso of Truth, a large scale custom Zamperla pendulum ride, was opened in 2019.

During the 2018 off-season, El Diablo was removed from the park and was relocated to La Ronde, where it reopened as Chaos.

In June 2019, the park completed a 23.5 MW solar facility, the largest net-metered solar farm in New Jersey. It produces around 30 million kWh per year, equivalent to most of the park's electricity needs. The facility includes 11 MW of solar canopy over the carpark. The facility was announced in March 2015.

=== 2020–present ===
On August 29, 2019, Six Flags announced a new coaster, the Jersey Devil Coaster, to be built by Rocky Mountain Construction. Six Flags suspended all operations across all their properties due to the COVID-19 pandemic in March 2020. In mid-May, the park announced that they would reopen the Safari Off Road Adventure as a drive-thru, which reopened on May 30, 2020. Following an announcement by Governor Phil Murphy on June 23, 2020, giving permission for amusement parks to reopen, Six Flags Great Adventure announced a day later that it would reopen on July 3, 2020. However, the Jersey Devil Coaster was delayed until the 2021 season because its construction was halted due to the pandemic.

In July 2021, the park re-themed the old Road Runner Railway kiddie roller coaster to Lil' Devil Coaster, a ride themed to the Jersey Devil, like the nearby Jersey Devil Coaster. In 2022, the park announced that Bizarro would be re-themed to Medusa, the ride's original theme. The park announced in 2023 that it would build a new roller coaster, The Flash: Vertical Velocity, which was scheduled to open in 2024, but was later delayed to 2025. The park announced that it would open a luxury glamping resort within its Safari Park named Savannah Sunset Resort and Spa, in which it opened in mid-2024. The addition of Savannah Sunset Resort and Spa caused the park to change the name of the entire complex to Six Flags Great Adventure Resort.

In November 2024, the park's new parent company Six Flags—formed via a July 2024 merger between Cedar Fair and Six Flags—announced in November 2024 that the park would receive an unnamed multi-launched roller coaster. With a code name of "Project Purple," construction on the roller coaster began in 2026 and is expected to open in 2027. Amidst the announcement, Kingda Ka permanently closed in November 2024 and was demolished in February 2025. The coaster was officially announced as Bakunawa on July 28, 2026. On March 26, 2026, the park announced a new area called Shoreline Pier. It would include four attractions from the former Six Flags America, including the spinning wild mouse roller coaster Ragin' Cajun. In addition, the park's Round-Up attraction would be relocated into the Shoreline Pier now named Super Round-Up. The Shoreline Pier would soft open in June 2026 with three out of the five attractions. The Shoreline Pier would officially open on July 1st, 2026

== Concerts ==
Numerous artists have performed concerts at the park, including Bon Jovi, The Ramones, The Beach Boys, Heart, Kansas, Cheap Trick, Joan Jett, and Alice Cooper.

On September 29, 2012, Great Adventure hosted the FestEvil, a festival hosting contemporary metal and hardcore acts; Falling In Reverse and We Came As Romans coheadlined. It was Great Adventure's first and last metal show. At the end of the show, Falling In Reverse frontman Ronnie Radke threw three microphone stands into the crowd, injuring two attendees. Radke was arrested after the show, and a spokesperson for Great Adventure announced that the park would no longer host shows with metal bands.

== Attractions ==
=== Main Street ===
Main Street serves as the entry gate for Six Flags Great Adventure. It was originally entitled Liberty Court and was built when the entrance to the park was moved from near what is now the Boardwalk area to a more central location. Main Street is themed as an Early-American town, somewhere around the 18th century. Later additions to Main Street have formed it into more of a turn-of-the-century town. In the front is Main Street Fountain, which serves as a central hub for the park.

=== Dream Street ===
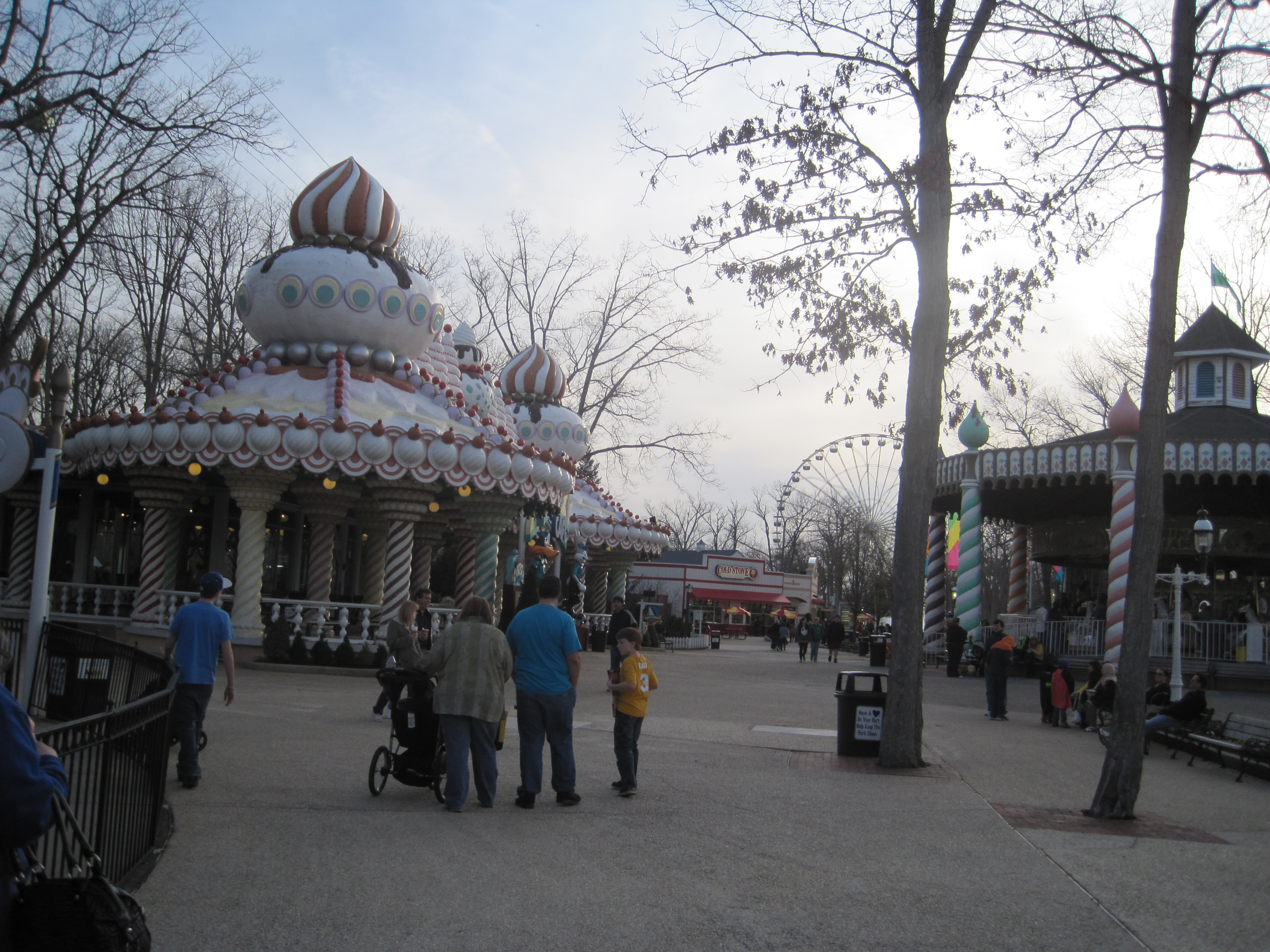
Yum Yum Cafe (left) and Patrina Williams Carousel (right)

Dream Street serves as the midway for the park and was originally part of the entrance. Dream Street is designed to make its visitors feel like children, and the section's bright colors and fanciful design give it a magical feel. The Yum Yum Cafe, (Previously "The Great Character Cafe"), which is designed to look like a giant ice cream sundae, is in this area along with the colorful Carousel and Enchanted Teacups. Originally, this section was split into two sections; Dream Street, the east side featuring the Carousel, and Strawberry Fair, the west side featuring the Giant Wheel and Fantasy Fling (now known as Swashbuckler). During Time Warner's acquisition of the park, these two sections of the park were combined into one. In 2012, the east side stayed as Fantasy Forest and the west side was re-themed and transformed to Adventure Alley. In 2025, Fantasy Forest was renamed Dream Street.

Ride	Year opened	Manufacturer	Description
Carousel	1974	Frederick Savage	The park's grand carousel. This antique carousel was originally built in 1881 by Frederick Savage in England and is named the Patrina Williams Carousel. It is one of three historic clockwise-turning English carousels in the United States.
Enchanted Tea Cups	1996	Zamperla	Tea-cups style ride with fanciful theming.
Houdini's Great Escape	1999	Vekoma	Vekoma Madhouse attraction; held in "mansion" and complete with Harry Houdini theming.

=== Adventure Alley ===
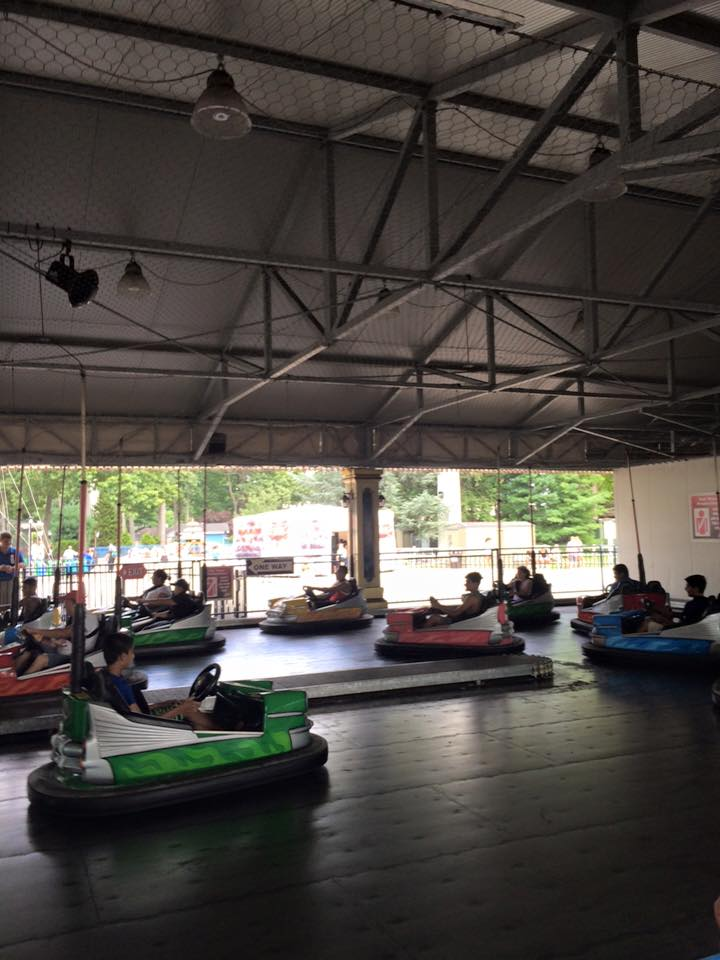
The Fender Benders ride.

Adventure Alley, made up of what used to be the right half of Fantasy Forest, opened in 2012 along with SkyScreamer, a FunTime StarFlyer. The area has a retro theme and features several classic family rides. It was built in a formerly barren area in response to complaints about there being a lack of family rides in the park. SkyScreamer, and The Scrambler (relocated from the shuttered American Adventures in Georgia), both opened in May, while Fender Benders, a bumper cars attraction, opened in early July. The area was sponsored by the Broadway show Jersey Boys and as such, features songs from the musical as its soundtrack.

Ride	Year opened	Manufacturer	Description
Fender Benders	2012	Bertazzon	Bumper cars attraction with retro theming.
Giant Wheel	1974	Anton Schwarzkopf	A large Ferris wheel that once held the title for the world's tallest Ferris wheel. Formerly called Big Wheel (1974-2023).
SkyScreamer	2012	Funtime	A Funtime Starflyer swing ride that swings riders 242 feet (74 m) high in the air at 43 miles per hour (69 km/h).
The Scrambler	2012	Eli Bridge Company	A retro-themed scrambler style attraction accompanied by a soundtrack featuring hit songs from the 1970s and 1980s. Formerly called DejaVu (2012-2024).

=== The Pine Barrens ===
The Pine Barrens opened in the park in 2021. It was called Adventure Seaport from 2011 to 2020. It is made up of a small section of the park formerly part of Movietown. Originally, The Pine Barrens also included Looney Tunes Seaport before it was removed in 2020.

Ride	Year opened	Manufacturer	Description
Jersey Devil Coaster	2021	Rocky Mountain Construction	single-rail roller coaster.
Nitro	2001	Bolliger & Mabillard	230-foot (70 m)-tall hyper-coaster
Roaring Rapids	1981	Intamin	Rapids ride; Known as Congo Rapids for a period of time. It was one of the first of its kind to open in the world.

=== Jr. Thrillseekers ===
Jr. Thrillseekers was known as Wiggles World from 2007 to 2010. Most of the rides were re-themed from Looney Tunes Seaport, while the section itself replaced an aging part of Looney Tunes Seaport and the outdated Riptide flume ride. The area was renamed and re-themed Safari Kids for 2011 when the parks rights to use the Wiggles brand expired. It was renamed to Jr. Thrillseekers in 2022.

Ride	Year opened	Description
Air Safari	2007	A red baron ride that includes planes as ride vehicles. Originally named Big Red Planes and rethemed in 2011.
Barnstormer	2022	Two mega-sized bi-planes swing high in the air, rotating on slow-moving arms that lift the planes in a relaxed circle through the sky.
Bugaboo	1976	A kiddie ride formerly located in the now defunct Balin's Jungleland themed section.
Lil' Devil Coaster	1999/2021	A Zamperla kiddie coaster that opened in 1999 as the Road Runner Railway; re-introduced in 2021 to coincide with the opening of the Jersey Devil Coaster.
Raja's Rickshaws	1982	A kiddie scrambler transferred from Balin's Jungleland themed section.
Sky Zooma	1999	A children's balloon ride that originally opened as Elmer Fudd's Seaport Weather Balloons and was later named Dorothy's Racing to the Rainbow. Rethemed in 2007 for Wiggles World and 2011 for Safari Kids.
Storm Chaser	1999	A small kids swing ride. Originally opened as Taz's Tornado. Rethemed in 2020 for Safari Kids as Tornado, then in 2022 again.
Tree Top Hopper	1999	A children's drop tower that originally opened as Sylvester's Pounce and Bounce and was later named Bouncin' With Wags then Jumpin' Joey. Rethemed in 2007 for Wiggles World and 2011 for Safari Kids.

=== Movietown ===
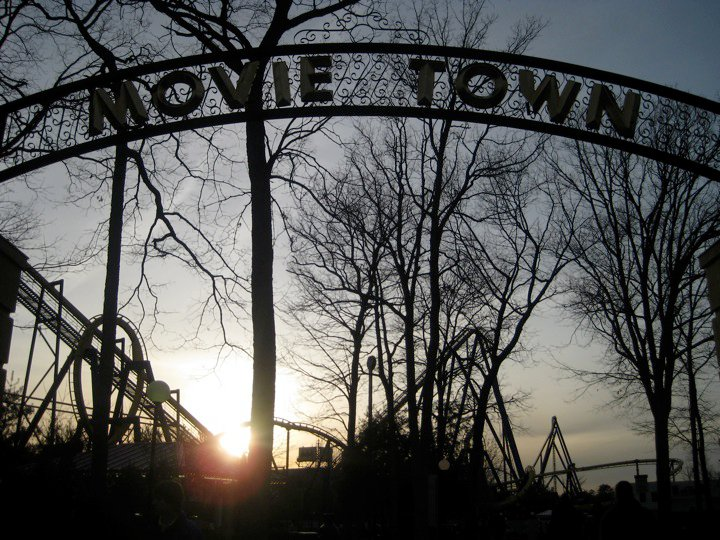
Movietown's entrance portal

This section makes up what used to be the "Fun Fair" and "Action Town" sections of the park. It is themed as a Hollywood back lot, complete with Hollywood style buildings, and movie-themed ride, shops, stalls, and other attractions. All of the attractions include DC Comics (Batman: The Ride). Over the years, many of the movie props have been removed, and all the flat rides in this section of the park have been moved or dismantled. This left the section with very few rides: the addition of The Dark Knight Coaster meant the removal of the Movietown Water Effect, a themed Splashdown ride. Batman and Robin: The Chiller and Stuntman's Freefall (an Intamin free-fall ride) had already been removed, and the "Axis Chemical" themed amphitheater, while still standing, no longer hosts stunt shows. Nitro was included in Movietown until the 2011 season when it became part of Adventure Seaport (The Pine Barrens). For a time this section of the park was essentially a dead-end, forcing patrons to turn back after the Showcase Theater. The park reopened a pathway between this ride and the Justice League attraction, and now patrons can loop through Movietown and re-emerge near the fountain and the park's main entrance.

Ride	Year opened	Manufacturer	Description
Batman: The Ride	1993	Bolliger & Mabillard	The second installation of the Bolliger & Mabillard's "Batman" inverted coaster model.
The Dark Knight Coaster	2008	Mack Rides	Indoor themed wild-mouse coaster. The coaster opened in 2008 to coincide with the release of the hit movie, The Dark Knight.

=== Metropolis ===
Ride	Year opened	Manufacturer	Description
Justice League: Battle for Metropolis	2017	Sally Corporation	A 4D interactive dark ride. Replaced Batman & Robin: The Chiller.
The Flash: Vertical Velocity	2025	Vekoma	Super Boomerang
Wonder Woman: Lasso of Truth	2019	Zamperla	Frisbee

=== Lakefront ===
Lakefront, as its name suggests, is found right on the lake in the back of the property. The rides and structures in Lakefront all have a nautical theme.

Ride	Year opened	Manufacturer	Description
Air Jumbo	2012	Zamperla	Flying elephants style ride relocated from the now-defunct Golden Kingdom section of the park.
Buccaneer	1980	Intamin	A pirate ship ride.
Harley Quinn Crazy Train	1999	Zierer	Family coaster themed as a mine train. Was previously named Blackbeard's Lost Treasure Train up until the 2016 season where it was renamed to accompany the newly added Joker.
Jolly Roger	1999	Zamperla	A pirate themed music express ride.
Skull Mountain	1996	Intamin	Indoor roller coaster themed to be an adventure into a mountain of treasures.
The Joker	2016	S&S Worldwide	A Free Spin Roller Coaster taking the place of the Grandstand, Festival Stage, and Fort Independence. Was named Total Mayhem when announced.

=== Frontier Adventures ===
Previously known as "Best of the West" and "Rootin' Tootin' Rip Roarin'", Frontier Adventures is the park's western-themed section. It is home to the Fort and the Best of the West restaurant, as well as some of the park's rides.

It stands on the former location of the Super Teepee and the Conestoga Wagon.

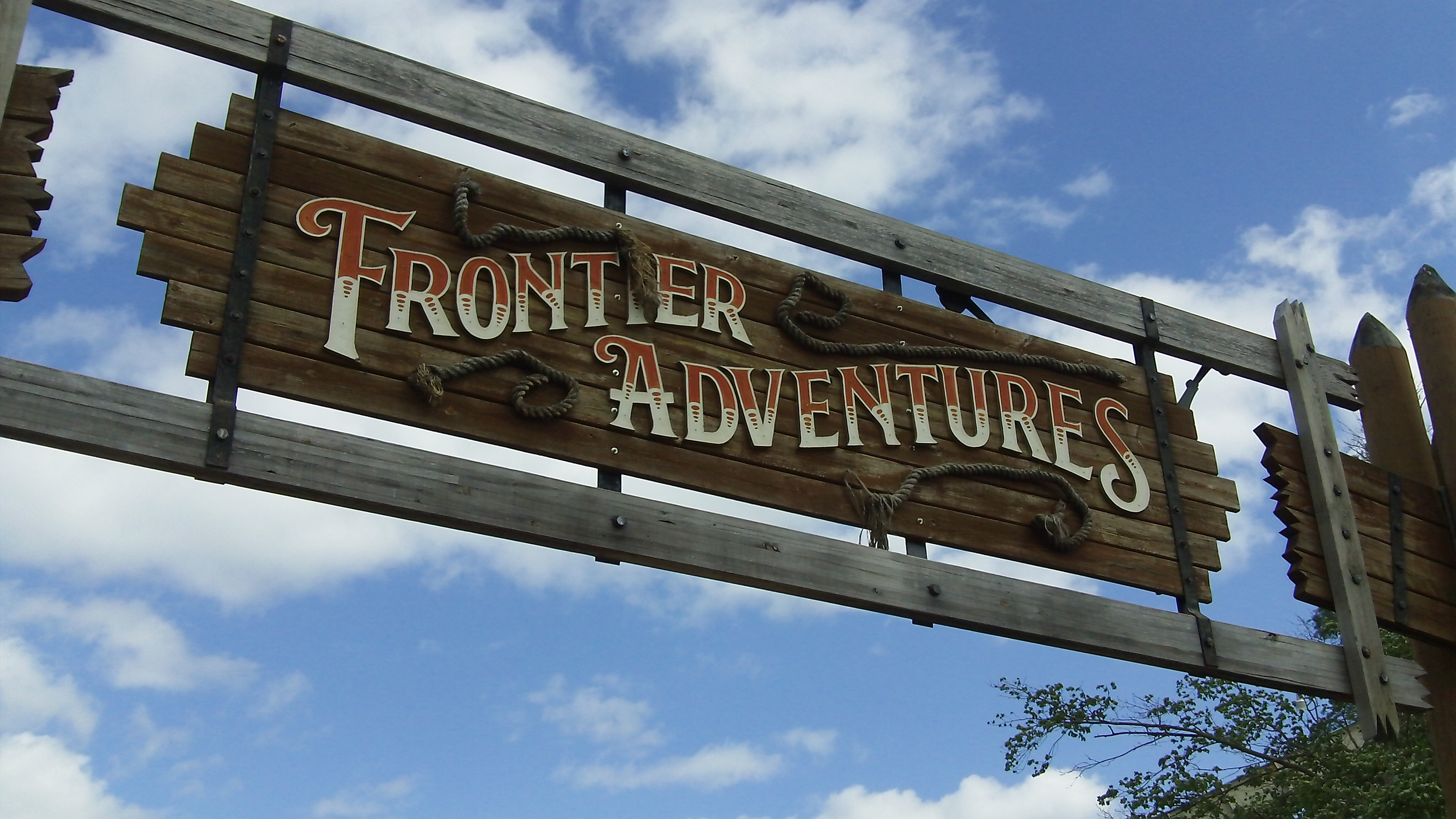
The portal to Frontier Adventures

Ride	Year opened	Manufacturer	Description
Medusa	1999	Bolliger & Mabillard	The world's first floorless coaster, featuring 7 inversions. Formerly called Bizarro 2009–2021.
Runaway Train	1974	Arrow Development	A mine train roller coaster that debuted at Great Adventure's grand opening in 1974. It is the park's first roller coaster, which takes riders through wooded areas and over water before returning to the station. The coaster was overhauled in 1995 by Larry Chickola, the first of many projects the engineer completed for Six Flags, which involved a redesign of the motor, cars, and computer operating system.
Safari Off-road Adventure	July 4, 1974		An open-air vehicle guided ride tour with nearly 1,200 animals from six continents. There are 2 separate lines to board vehicles for the tour. One boards inside the amusement park and offers a shorter 35-minute tour. The second line boards outside the amusement park at the Safari Base Camp and offers an extended tour about 10 minutes longer taking in the full safari experience including the Asia and Americas sections.
Saw Mill Log Flume	1974	Arrow Development	The park's log flume, which takes riders up and then traverses several small drops on a separate island before ending on a large drop.

=== Bugs Bunny National Park ===
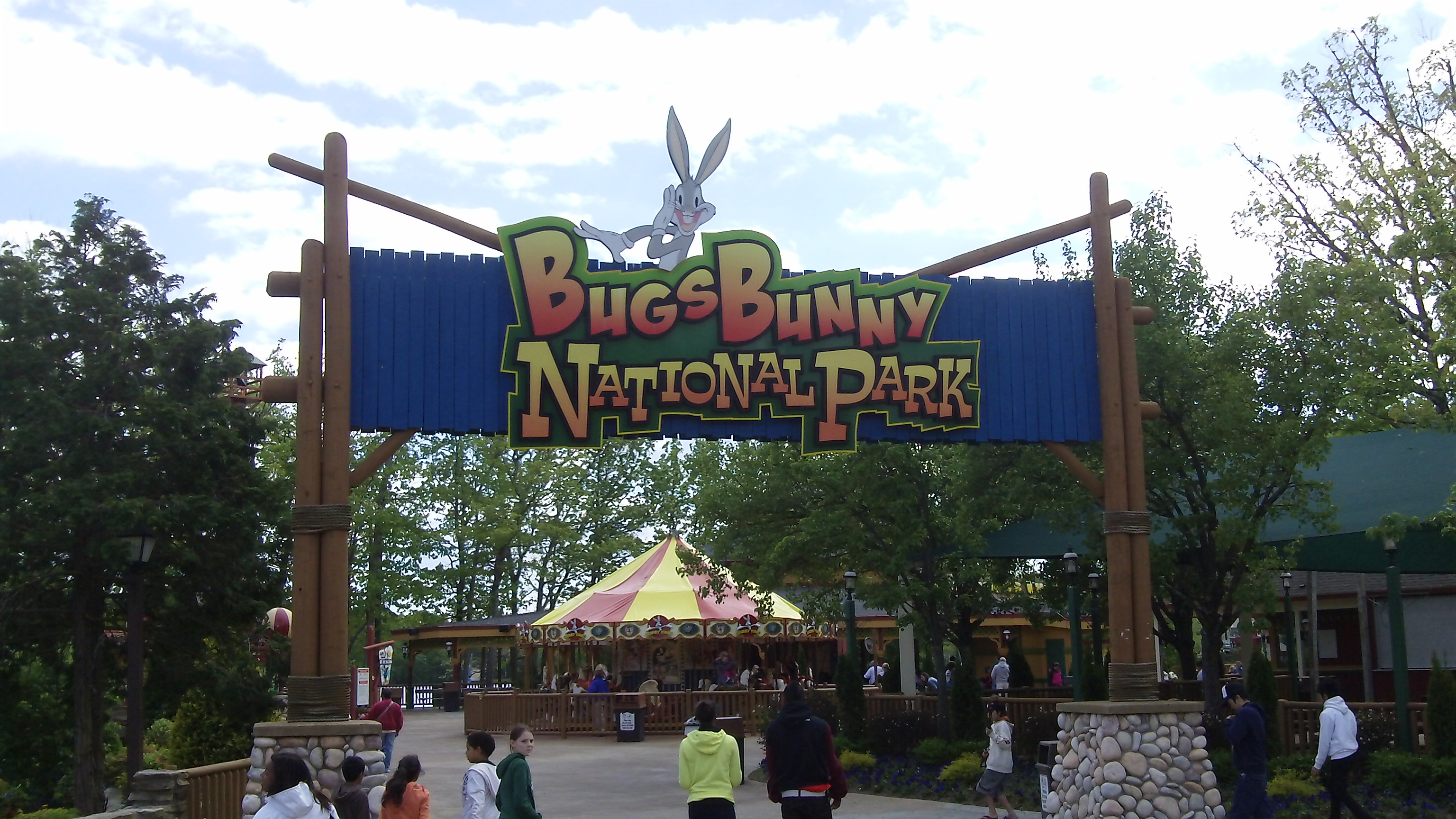
The entrance to Bugs Bunny National Park

Bugs Bunny National Park opened in 2006 along with El Toro. It has a series of camp-themed rides, all in a rustic area on the lake.

Ride	Year opened	Manufacturer	Description
Bugs Bunny Camp Carousel	1979	Allan Herschell Company	A small carousel, themed with posters for different Bugs Bunny cartoons, including "Knighty Knight Bugs".
Bugs Bunny Ranger Pilots	2006		A red baron ride that was relocated from Six Flags AstroWorld.
Daffy Duck's Hot Air Balloons	2006		A balloon ride.
Porky Pig Camp Wagons	2006		A small ferris wheel with ride vehicles themed to be wagons.
Wile E. Coyote Canyon Blaster	2006	Chance Rides	Kiddie music express ride.

=== Plaza del Carnaval ===
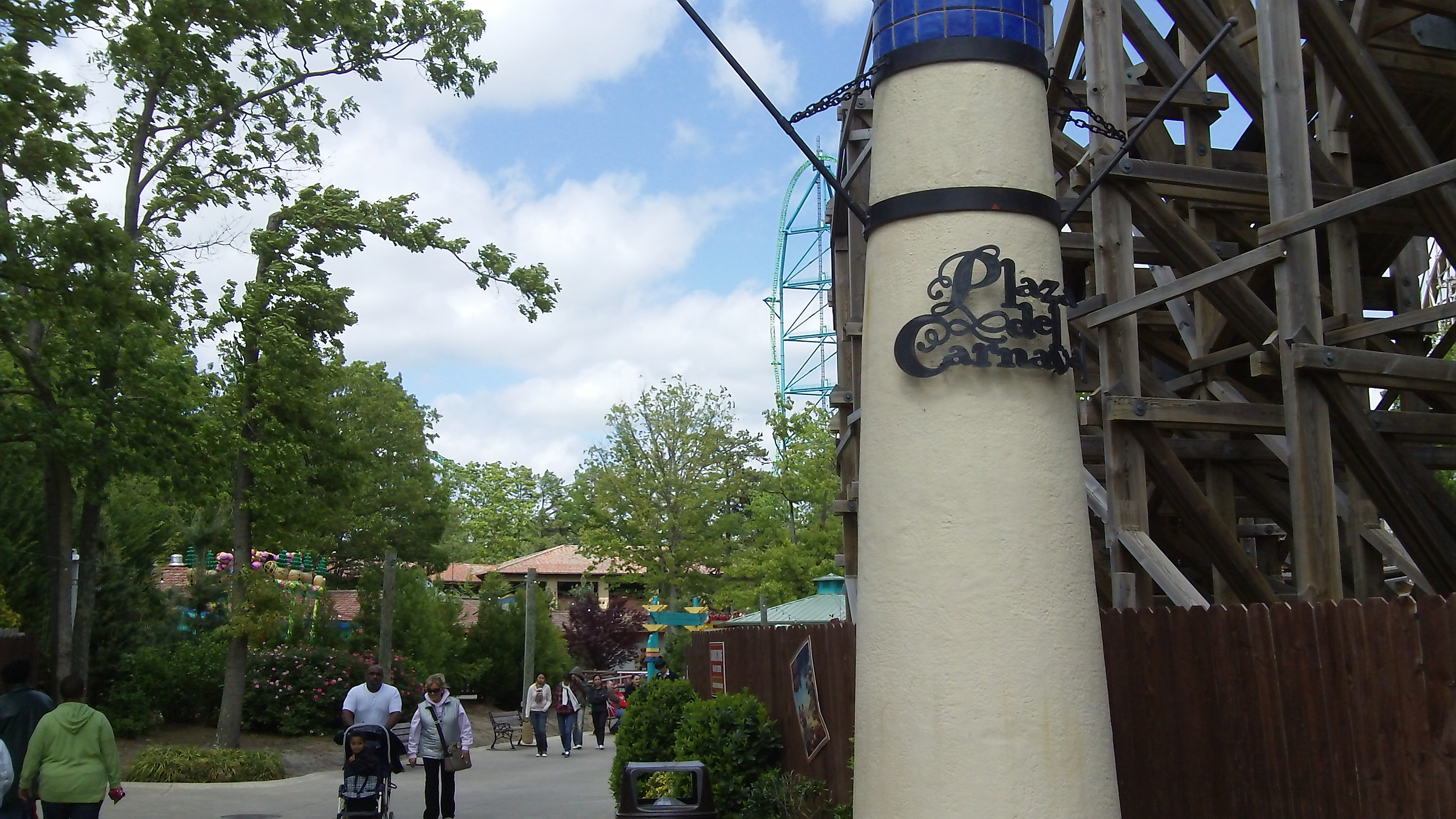
The entrance to Plaza del Carnaval

This area was originally part of Frontier Adventures, and was also called "Hernando's Hideaway" for the opening of Rolling Thunder. This section of the park has heavy Spanish and Latin American influences, including music, lights, and various structures including the station for El Toro. The whole area is very festive and is filled with vibrant colors, stucco buildings, and Spanish tile roofs.

Ride	Year opened	Manufacturer	Description
El Toro	2006	Intamin	Prefabricated wooden roller coaster with the world's fifth-steepest drop on a wooden roller coaster. Voted the world's best wooden roller coaster by the Golden Ticket Awards for 2012.
Tango	2006	Zamperla	Rockin' tug ride.

=== Shoreline Pier at the Boardwalk ===
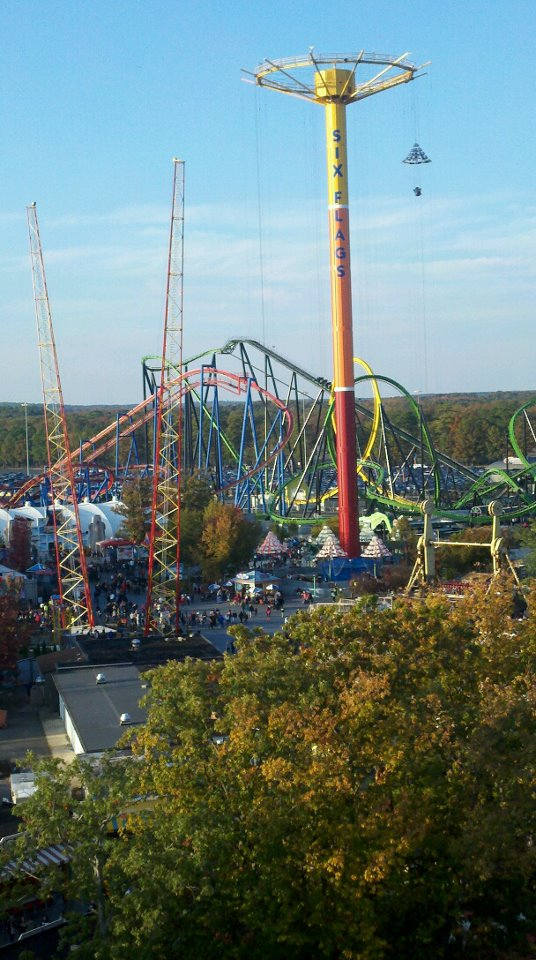
View of the Boardwalk in 2012, prior to the Shoreline Pier expansion in 2026

The area is themed around a New Jersey oceanside pier featuring amusement rides and games. It was formerly known as simply The Boardwalk before receiving its retheme and renovation in 2026.

Ride	Year opened	Manufacturer	Description
Bakunawa	2027	Mack Rides Xtreme Spin	Shuttle spinning launched roller coaster, with a height of 382 feet (116 m) and a speed of 100 miles per hour (160 km/h).
Barrels O’ Fun	2026	Reverchon/Spinning Coaster / Original	Relocated Ragin' Cajun coaster from Six Flags America.
Flying Scooters	2026	Larson International/Flying Scooters	Relocated from Six Flags America
Hypno Twister	2026	Zamperla Nebulaz	Relocated from Six Flags America
Slingshot	2011	Funtime	Tall, slingshot ride, upcharge.
Superman: Ultimate Flight	2003	Bolliger & Mabillard	Flying coaster, featuring 2 inversions.
Super Roundup	1974	Hrubetz	A round up ride, it has been relocated and repainted several times. Originally opened as "Super Round Up", also formerly known as Fantasy Fling, Swashbuckler and Tornado.
Wave Swinger	2026	Zamperla/Flying carousel	Relocated from Six Flags America

== Resort complex ==
=== Hurricane Harbor New Jersey ===
The layout of Six Flags Great Adventure Resort.

Six Flags Hurricane Harbor New Jersey is a water park located within the Six Flags Great Adventure Resort complex. A separately-gated water park, it was a $40 million expansion to Six Flags Great Adventure.

=== Wild Safari Adventure ===
Six Flags Wild Safari Adventure is a safari park located within the Six Flags Great Adventure Resort complex.

=== Savannah Sunset Resort and Spa ===
Savannah Sunset Resort and Spa is a glamping resort located adjacent to Six Flags Wild Safari Adventure. It features 20 glamping suites.

== Former attractions ==
Ride	Year opened	Year closed	Manufacturer	Description
Boats	1974	1974		Paddle boat rentals that guests were able to use in the lake.
Antique Cars	1974	1975		Antique car ride.
Jumbo Jet	1975	1975	Schwarzkopf	It was built and tested only a few times before it was removed. It is not known as to why it was never opened to the public unless if asked
Big Fury	1974	1977		
Pretty Monster	1974	1977		
Enterprise	1975	1977		
Wild Flower	1975	1977		
Gondola	1977	1977		
Super Cat	1975	1978		
Alpen Blitz	1976	1978	Schwarzkopf	Featured two cars that would push or pull the train along its course.
Haunted House	1978	1978		Replaced with Haunted Castle after a season.
Grand Prix	1974	1979		Antique car ride.
Great Train Ride	1974	1980		
Wild Rider	1978	1981	Schwarzkopf	
Super Sidewinder	1976	1983	Chance Rides	
The Screamer	1976	1983	Molina and Son's	Children's roller coaster.
Haunted Castle	1979	1984		Burned down in 1984, killing 8 people.
Matterhorn	1974	1986		
Calypso	1974	1987		
Skooter	1975	1987		Bumper car attraction.
Monster Spin	1978	1987		
Tilt-a-Whirl	1979	1987		
Paddle Boats	1983	1987		Paddle boats that park guests could use in the lake.
Sarajevo Bobsled	1984	1988	Intamin	Was moved to Six Flags Great America in 1989 and renamed Rolling Thunder. Later relocated to Six Flags Great Escape and Hurricane Harbor in 1997 and reopened the following year. It operated at Great Escape until it closed in 2023.
Ultra Twister	1986	1989	Togo	Was moved to Six Flags AstroWorld.
Condor	1988	1990	Huss	Relocated to Six Flags Great America in 1991 where it continues to operate.
Swiss Bob	1974	1991		
Traffic Jam	1974	1992		A classic bumper cars ride.
Lightnin' Loops	1978	1992	Arrow Dynamics	A roller coaster where one track was sent to Adventure World (now named Six Flags America) while the other was moved to Frontier City.
Shockwave	1990	1992	Intamin	Was moved to Six Flags AstroWorld.
Virtual Revolution	1995	1995		A flight simulator.
Panorama Wheel	1974	1996		Ferris wheel.
Joust-a-Bout	1982	1998	Schwarzkopf	Removed due to high maintenance costs. Remains in the park’s boneyard. Was replaced by Twister.
African Tower	1991	1998	New Wave Rides	Was a part of the Adventure Rivers section that was removed to make more space for the mass amount of attractions to be added the following season.
Asian Tower	1991	1998	New Wave Rides	Was a part of the Adventure Rivers section that was removed to make more space for the mass amount of attractions to be added the following season.
North American Tower	1991	1998	New Wave Rides	Was a part of the Adventure Rivers section that was removed to make more space for the mass amount of attractions to be added the following season.
Spinnaker	1999	2000		
Schwabinchen	1975	2001		Removed at the end of the 1986 season but was added back in 1993 as El Sombrero.
Scrambler	1978	2001		
Pirate's Flight	1999	2001		Was relocated to Geauga Lake in 2002 but fate is unknown after the park closed in 2007.
Time Warp	1999	2001	Chance Rides	Double Inverter
Sling Shot	2001	2001		It was a trailer mounted attraction.
Evolution	1999	2002		Was relocated to Six Flags St. Louis in 2003 where it was renamed Xcalibur and operated there until it was removed in 2023.
Speed Sports	2001	2002		
Turbo Force	2001	2002		It was a trailer mounted attraction.
Jumpin' Jack Flash	1999	2003	HUSS	
Pendulum	1999	2003	HUSS	Frisbee-style ride. Was relocated to Six Flags Great America for the 2004 season and operated there as Revolution until 2023. It was relocated to Niagara Amusement Park & Splash World in 2024 and was renamed Midway Mayhem.
Rotor	1975	2005		
Spin Meister	1979	2005		
Viper	1995	2005	Togo	Removed due to maintenance issues and low ridership. Was torn down in 2005 and would be replaced by El Toro in 2006 which would reuse Viper’s Spanish mission station.
Rodeo Stampede	1999	2005		Relocated to Six Flags Over Texas in 2006
Chaos	1999	2005		Remains in the park’s boneyard. Was replaced by Déjà Vu in 2012.
Freefall	1983	2006	Intamin	A traditional drop tower ride.
Hydro Flume	1999	2006		
Flying Wave	1974	2007		Sky Screamer would open on the former site in 2012.
Autobahn	1976	2007		Bumper cars. The ride building has been closed since 2008.
Musik Express	1976	2007		Closed from 2008 to 2014, removed mid-2014.
Looping Starship	1985	2007	Intamin	Was located next to Great American Scream Machine's batwing.
Splash Water Falls	1987	2007	Hopkins	The name was changed to Movie Town Water Effect during its life at the park.
Batman and Robin: The Chiller	1997	2007	Premier Rides	The ride was closed very often and opened almost a year behind schedule. The Batman side was troubled more than the Robin as it was rarely open throughout its lifetime.
Alcatraz	2001	2007		The ride was not very popular as its entrance was hard to locate and guests did not know what the ride was.
The Great American Scream Machine	1989	2010	Arrow Dynamics	The ride was replaced by Green Lantern.
The Right Stuff: Mach 1 Adventure	1994	2010	Iwerks	Motion simulator that had many different films throughout its lifetime. The building is currently used for storage as the theater seats have been removed from the main show room.
Eruption	2003	2010		
Turbo Bungy	2001	2011		A trampoline attraction.
Rolling Thunder	1979	2013	William Cobb & Associates	Zumanjaro: Drop of Doom and El Diablo unofficially replaced it.
Safari Tours	1999	2018		A track car ride. Formally known as the "Big Red Cars" and "Taz's Seaport Trucking Co." The tracks were removed and area is currently vacant and the queue building is abandoned. The area was used for the 2019 Fright Fest Children's Trick or Treat Trail.
El Diablo	2015	2018	Larson International	22M Giant Loop. Originally named "Looping Dragon" when announced. Relocated to La Ronde by the end of the 2018 season and renamed Chaos.
Bugs Bunny Seaport Barnstormer	1999	2019		A plane themed ride spinning on two separate axes. The ride was replaced by Jersey Devil Coaster.
Daffy's Deep Sea Diver	1999	2019	Zamperla	A submarine themed ride. The ride was replaced by Jersey Devil Coaster.
Pepe Le Pew's Hearts Aweigh	1999	2019		A miniature spinning teacups ride. The ride was replaced by Jersey Devil Coaster.
Parachute Training Center: Edwards AFB Jump Tower	1983	2022	Intamin	Gentle 23-story drop using parachutes on a tower.
Skyride	1974	2023	Von Roll Holding	A double gondola lift moved from the 1964 World's Fair, it loads in a building called "The Fort", and takes riders to Lakefront.
Cyborg Cyber Spin	2018	2023	ABC Rides	A Tourbillon model. Replaced by The Flash: Vertical Velocity in 2025.
Dare Devil Dive	1997	2024	Skycoaster, Inc.	Skycoaster, upcharge.
Twister	1999	2024	Huss Maschinenfabrik	A top spin ride.
Kingda Ka	2005	2024	Intamin	Strata-coaster, was the tallest roller coaster in the world. Themed as a bengal tiger, the queue line took riders through bamboo plants.
Green Lantern	2011	2024	Bolliger & Mabillard	Stand-up coaster, featuring 5 inversions. Formerly located at Six Flags Kentucky Kingdom as Chang.
Zumanjaro: Drop of Doom	2014	2024	Intamin	Was the world's tallest drop tower, which was built on the tower of Kingda Ka. Riders could see Philadelphia's skyline on clear days.
Great American Road Race	1999	2025	J&J Amusements	Go-karts, upcharge.
Foghorn Leghorn Stagecoach Express	2006	2025	Zamperla	A train ride themed to be horses pulling stagecoaches, with the horses having motion.

== Awards ==
Many of Six Flags Great Adventure's most thrilling roller coasters have placed in Amusement Today's annual Golden Ticket Awards. Below is a table with coasters at Great Adventure and their highest ranking in the Golden Ticket Awards.

Roller Coaster	Highest Rank
Nitro	3 (2007–2012)
El Toro	1 (2012, 2017)
Medusa	16 (1999)
Kingda Ka	25 (2008)

In 2012, Six Flags Great Adventure, along with the Garden State Film Festival, was awarded the Tourism Achievement Award. Both were presented the award for their contributions to improving the economy of the bi-county area through the use of tourism.

== Attendance ==
Although Six Flags does not release attendance figures, the Themed Entertainment Association (TEA) and other theme park industry analyst companies estimate attendance numbers for the park.

Year	Attendance (millions)
2006	2.73
2007	2.72
2008	2.76
2009	2.63
2010	2.70
2011—2012	No data (Note: TEA did not report attendance figures from 2011 through 2012 because the park was not in the top 20 most attended North American parks those years.)
2013	2.80
2014	2.80
2015	3.05
2016	3.22
2017	3.24
2018	3.40
2019	3.45
2020	0.60
2021	2.91
2022	2.15
2023	2.50
2024	No data
