= Lightnin' Loops =

Steel roller coaster

Six Flags Great Adventure
- Park section: Movietown
- Coordinates: 40.1358°N 74.4437°W
- Status: Removed
- Opening date: May 23, 1978
- Closing date: 1992
- Replaced by: Batman: The Ride
- Lightnin' Loops at Six Flags Great Adventure at RCDB

Six Flags Great Adventure
- Park section: Movietown
- Coordinates: 40°08′09.1″N 74°26′37.1″W
- Status: Removed
- Opening date: May 23, 1978
- Closing date: 1986
- Replaced by: Batman: The Ride

Six Flags America
- Park section: Southwest Territory
- Coordinates: 38.9093°N 76.7718°W
- Status: Removed
- Opening date: 1993
- Closing date: 1998
- Replaced by: Two-Face: The Flip Side

Frontier City
- Coordinates: 35°35′11.7″N 97°26′28.9″W
- Status: Operating
- Opening date: 1993

General statistics
- Type: Steel – Launched – Shuttle
- Manufacturer: Arrow Development
- Track layout: Interlocking Shuttle Loop
- Height: 56 ft (17 m)
- Drop: 47 ft (14 m)
- Length: 635 ft (194 m)
- Speed: 45 mph (72 km/h)
- Inversions: 1
- Duration: 1:06
- G-force: 4
- Height restriction: 48 in (122 cm)
- Lightnin' Loops at RCDB

Lightnin' Loops was a pair of Shuttle Loop roller coasters that were originally installed at Six Flags Great Adventure in Jackson, New Jersey. The ride consisted of two identical tracks, both of which were later relocated and renamed: the still-extant Diamondback at Frontier City in Oklahoma City and the defunct Python at Six Flags America in Largo, Maryland (near Washington, D.C.).

Manufactured by Arrow Development, the ride opened on May 23, 1978, with a unique feature at the time. Both tracks interlocked at their vertical loop element. The ride's popularity declined in the mid-to-late 1980s, and a fatal incident occurred in 1987. The ride had limited operation when it reopened later that year and was eventually dismantled in 1992.

== History ==
=== Six Flags Great Adventure ===
Lightnin' Loops was built in 1977 and opened in 1978 at Six Flags Great Adventure. Six Flags had acquired the park in 1977 and Lightnin' Loops was planned by the prior ownership as far back as 1976. The coaster was located on the west side of the park that is currently occupied by Movietown, Batman: The Ride, and Nitro.

At the time of its opening, Lightnin' Loops was the world's only dueling shuttle loop coaster, and the only one with interlocking loops. Each track featured a launch system that used an electric winch to propel the train forward. Afterwards, it traversed a steep decline, a single vertical loop, and a final ascent into another launch station at the same height as the loading area. The train was then launched backwards through the same elements before returning to the station.

The ride continued to be the star attraction at the park throughout the 1980s, although other coasters such as 1979's Rolling Thunder, 1984's Sarajevo Bobsled, and 1986's Ultra Twister also were major coasters. The popularity of Lightnin' Loops faded in 1989 when the aforementioned Sarajevo Bobsled was replaced with a brand new, state-of-the-art looping coaster also built by Arrow Dynamics: Great American Scream Machine, which was billed as the world's tallest and fastest looping coaster. Also unpopular was the 56 foot (17 m) high stair-climb to reach the loading area.

=== Closure and relocation ===
By 1990, the area occupied by Lightnin' Loops became an underused area of the park due to the lack of theming. Adventure Rivers was added nearby in 1991. A new stunt show arena was built next to Lightnin' Loops, and the area was transformed in "Action Town". In May 1992, management announced that Lightnin' Loops would close at the end of July, and it was dismantled in August. One of the loops was sold to Funtime Parks, while the other loop was moved to the site formerly occupied by Ultra Twister. Construction of Batman The Ride began on the site of the space occupied by Lightnin' Loops, and its construction led the area's conversion into Movietown.

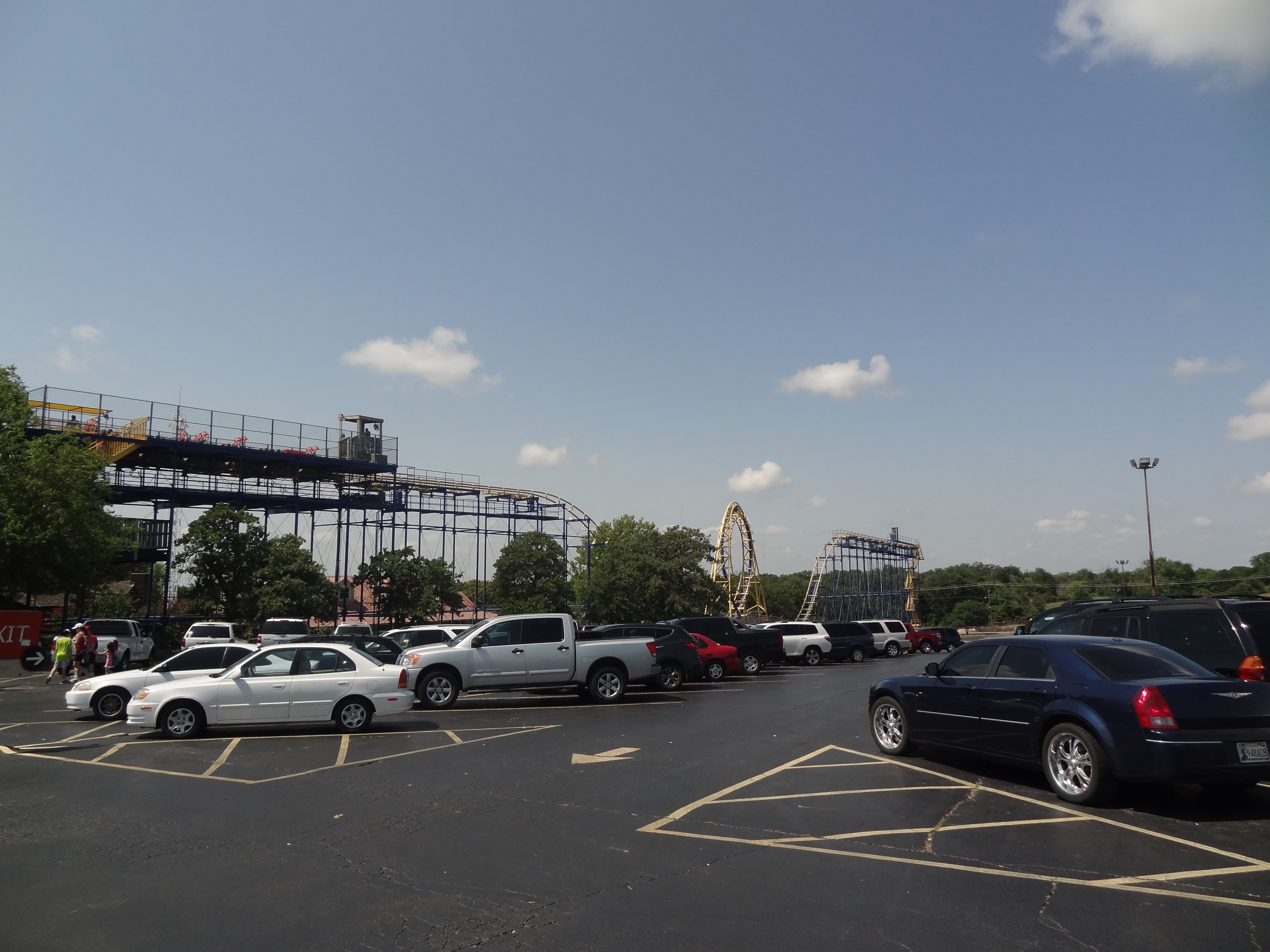
The lower track of Lightnin' Loops at its current location.

At the end of 1992, it was decided that both tracks of Lightnin' Loops would be sold to Funtime Parks. Lightnin' Loops was sent to two different parks, both then owned by Funtime. The upper track was sent to Adventure World in Largo, Maryland (near Washington, D.C.). It was rebuilt and reopened in 1994 as Python. The lower track was sent to Frontier City near Oklahoma City. It was rebuilt and reopened in 1994 as Diamondback. As of 2026, it is the only track of Lightnin' Loops still in operation.

Adventure World was renamed Six Flags America in 1999, and Python was disassembled to make room for more modern roller coasters and attractions. It was scrapped in 2005 after nearly 5 years in storage.

== Accidents ==
On June 17, 1987, a 19-year-old woman from Chester, Pennsylvania fell 75 feet (23 m) to her death as a result of not being properly secured by the over-the-shoulder harness. She was pronounced dead at a nearby hospital with Basilar skull fracture suffered from the fall. Early reports indicated that the woman tried to board late after the safety harness was locked and the attendant couldn't stop the train. An investigation found the ride itself to be operating properly, but that an error was made by the ride operator, who started the ride without ensuring all passengers were secured. The park was fined the state maximum of $1,000, and the ride reopened on October 10, 1987.

Also in June 1987, a man from New York sued Six Flags Great Adventure, claiming that he had been injured after going on the ride in 1985.
