= Wild Rider (Six Flags Great Adventure) =

Defunct compact steel roller coaster

Six Flags Great Adventure
- Location: Six Flags Great Adventure
- Park section: Enchanted Forest
- Coordinates: 40.136300°N 74.441600°W
- Status: Removed
- Opening date: 1978
- Closing date: 1980
- Replaced: Big Fury

General statistics
- Type: Steel
- Manufacturer: Anton Schwarzkopf
- Designer: Werner Stengel
- Model: Wildcat - Unknown
- Wild Rider at RCDB

The Wild Rider refers to one of two defunct rides that were located at Six Flags Great Adventure in the 1970s.

The first Wild Rider was a HUSS troika flat ride in the Fun Fair section of the park. This ride was operational for only a few seasons, and was removed in 1978.

The second Wild Rider was a compact steel roller coaster, a new 54-meter Schwarzkopf Wildcat. The ride operated from 1978 through 1980, replacing the similar-looking Italian-built carnival coaster called Big Fury. Its track was similar to a wild mouse, with single cars running on it. At the end of the 1980 season, the Wild Rider was taken out of commission. The ride was then removed before the 1982 season and never replaced.

This Wild Rider was located in the Enchanted Forest area of the park and would be seen behind Mama Flora's Cuchina if it were standing in its original location. If the two Wild Riders had existed at the same time, they would have been located across a walkway from one another.
