= Dexter Freebish =

American rock group

- Origin: Austin, Texas
- Genres: Alternative rock, pop rock
- Years active: 1995–present
- Labels: Capitol, Copper Moon
- Members: Robert Kyle; Chris Lowe; Scott Romig; Rob Schilz; Charles Martin
- Past members: Scott Thomas
- Website: www.dexterfreebish.com

Dexter Freebish is a band based in Austin, Texas, consisting of Robert Kyle (lead singer), Scott Romig (guitarist), Chris Lowe (bassist/backing vocalist), Charles Martin (additional guitarist), and Rob Schilz (drummer). They are perhaps best known for the 2000 single "Leaving Town," which peaked at number 11 on the Billboard Bubbling Under Hot 100. They have released five albums and one extended play, with their most recent release being the October 19, 2010 LP Shine On.

== History ==
The band was originally named "The Twigs" while starting out in Austin, TX playing a residency at Hondo's on 6th Street. They later changed it to Dexter Freebish. The name comes from "Dexter Frebish's Electric Roller Ride", the name of a former roller coaster at Astroworld theme park in Houston, TX. (Note that the coaster's name has only one 'e' in 'Frebish')

In 1999, the band won the John Lennon Songwriting Contest Song of the Year for their song “Leaving Town," picked from approximately 27,000 entries. They eventually signed with Capitol Records and recorded their first major label album in 2000 titled A Life of Saturdays. The lead single, "Leaving Town," was a Top 40 radio hit, peaking at 22 on the US pop charts on February 24, 2001. The song's video was played frequently on VH1 and MTV2. "Leaving Town" also peaked at #25 on the Modern Rock Charts on September 16th, 2000. The second single, "My Madonna," received moderate radio play but failed to chart. In 2001, Dexter Freebish was personally invited by Yoko Ono to play at the Rock and Roll Hall of Fame for the opening of the John Lennon Exhibit. Several of Dexter Freebish's songs have appeared on MTV's The Real World. The band has also toured the world and played several shows for the U.S. Navy stationed in the Middle East, Asia, and Europe. They also performed at the 2004 Republican National Convention.

In 2001, Dexter Freebish contributed a live performance of their song "My Madonna" to the charity album Live in the X Lounge IV. Soon after, the band decided to part ways with Capitol Records due to creative differences. Their next album, Tripped Into Divine, was released on Independent record label Sixthman Records. The lead single, "Prozak", won Best Rock Song in the 2004 John Lennon Songwriting Contest.

After a four-year hiatus, the band partnered up with Artwerk, a joint venture between Electronic Arts and the Nettwerk Music Group. The band announced the release of a 'Best Songs' album, set to be released January 13, 2009. The album consisted of re-recorded songs from the band's previous catalog, as well as four brand new tracks. October 19, 2010 the band released "Shine On", their first full-length album of new material in over six years.

Their songs have been featured in several video games, mostly with the Electronic Arts label. The song "Ghosts" is featured in Tiger Woods PGA Tour 2004, "Save Me" in Superman Returns, and both "Falling Down" and "Life of Saturdays" in NHL 2004. "Pretty People" was re-recorded in Simlish for Maxis-Electronic Arts game The Sims 2: University, and "The Other Side" is featured in The Sims 3, which was released June 2, 2009.

== Albums ==
Dexter Freebish, 1996
No.	Title	Length
1.	"Going Places"	3:58
2.	"Broken Arrow"	3:35
3.	"Together"	5:24
4.	"Love and Understanding"	4:10
5.	"Intro"	0:40
6.	"They Told Me"	3:45
7.	"Once Again"	5:15
8.	"Another World"	3:35
9.	"Images"	4:00
10.	"Grass is Greener"	5:06
11.	"Dark Screen"	4:18
12.	"Thoughts Invade"	4:34
13.	"The Giving of Time"	3:02
14.	"Loitering"	4:12

Another World (EP), 1997
No.	Title	Length
1.	"Broken Arrow"	3:25
2.	"She Is"	3:49
3.	"Rise"	4:18
4.	"Once Again"	5:10
5.	"Shadowman"	4:26

A Life of Saturdays, 2000
No.	Title	Length
1.	"Leaving Town"	3:56
2.	"My Madonna"	2:58
3.	"Higher"	3:31
4.	"What Do You See?"	5:49
5.	"Spotlight"	3:20
6.	"Tomorrow"	4:32
7.	"Deeper"	3:30
8.	"Falling Down"	2:50
9.	"Life of Saturdays"	2:39
10.	"Wonderland"	3:57
11.	"Bring Me Water"	2:51

Tripped Into Divine, 2004
No.	Title	Length
1.	"Prozak (Be Like Me)"	3:41
2.	"Pretty People"	3:26
3.	"Ghosts (Voices in My Head)"	3:24
4.	"How Do I Get Through To You?"	3:59
5.	"Heavy"	4:47
6.	"Save Me"	2:54
7.	"What I Need"	3:31
8.	"Wild Things"	3:43
9.	"Breathe"	4:02
10.	"No One Knows"	3:15
11.	"Twilight"	4:27
12.	"Breakdown"	4:49

The Other Side – The Best of Dexter Freebish, 2009
No.	Title	Length
1.	"The Other Side"	3:59
2.	"Leaving Town"	3:56
3.	"Prozak"	3:30
4.	"Twilight"	4:26
5.	"Walk on Water"	2:41
6.	"Higher"	3:31
7.	"Save Me"	2:52
8.	"Honestly"	5:09
9.	"Ghosts"	3:24
10.	"How Do I Get Through To You?"	3:52
11.	"Wonderland"	3:57
12.	"Wild Things"	3:40
13.	"Avalon"	3:38
14.	"Tomorrow"	4:32

Shine On, 2010
No.	Title	Length
1.	"Wide Awake"	3:08
2.	"Save The Last Dance"	4:38
3.	"Everybody Knows Somebody"	4:18
4.	"Do You Want To?"	4:42
5.	"Made Some Friends Along The Way"	3:24
6.	"When The Sun Shines"	4:26
7.	"Shine On"	4:57
8.	"The Need Machine"	5:56
9.	"Beautiful Girl"	4:20
10.	"Falling Off The Edge"	3:47
11.	"Come Down"	2:53
