= Apocalypse: The Ride =

Wooden roller coaster

- Previously known as Terminator Salvation: The Ride (2009–2010)
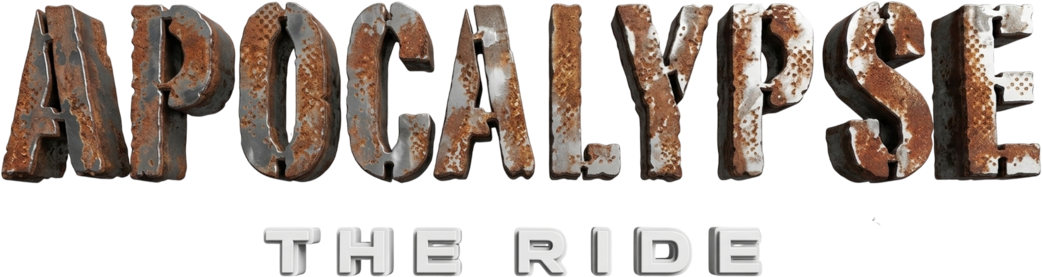

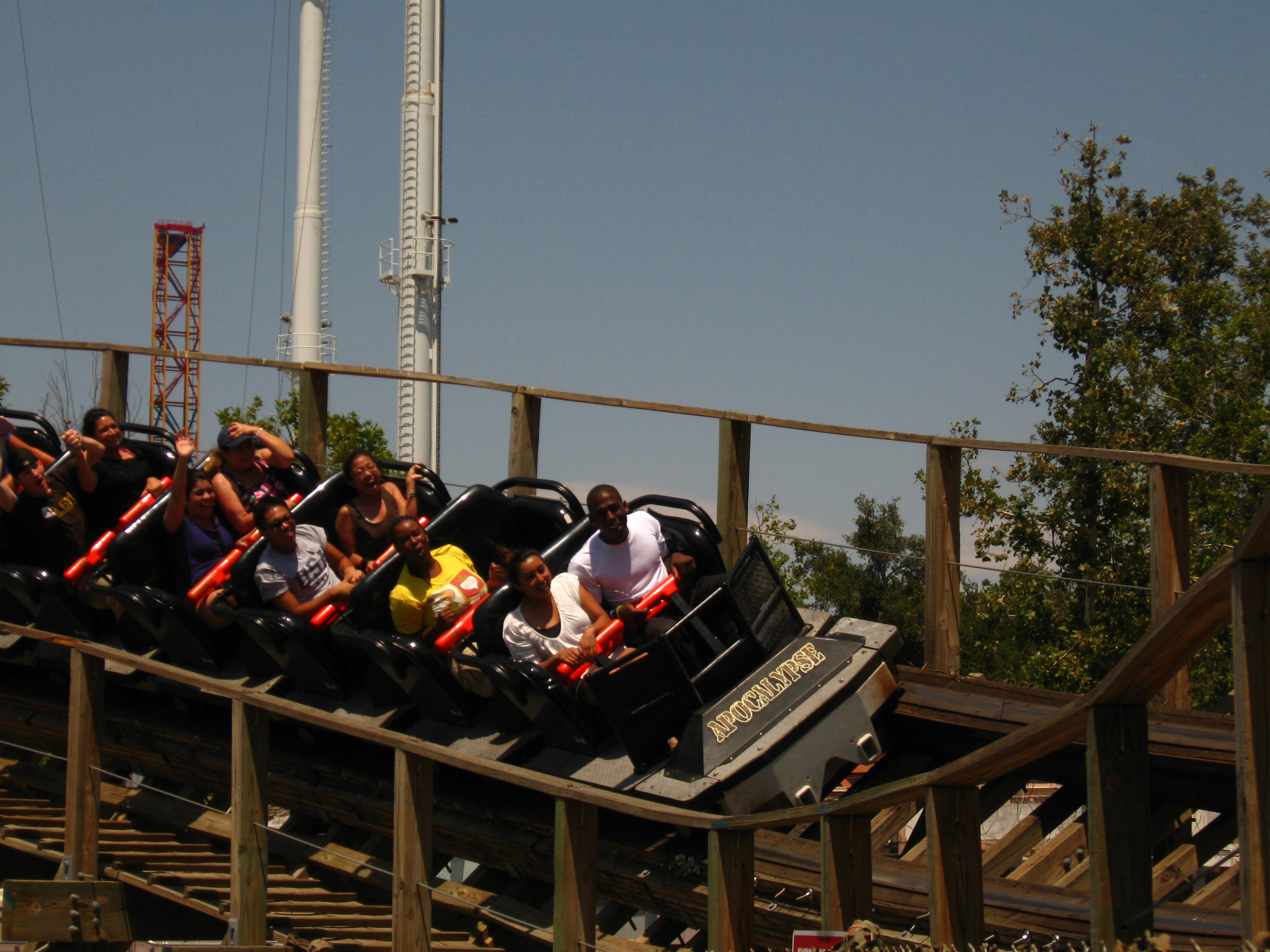
- Apocalypse running a train in 2011

Six Flags Magic Mountain
- Location: Six Flags Magic Mountain
- Park section: The Underground
- Coordinates: 34.4213°N 118.5998°W
- Status: Operating
- Opening date: May 23, 2009
- Cost: $10,000,000
- Replaced: Psyclone

General statistics
- Type: Wood
- Manufacturer: Great Coasters International
- Designer: Jeff Pike
- Lift/launch system: Chain lift hill
- Height: 95 ft (29 m)
- Drop: 87.3 ft (26.6 m)
- Length: 2,877 ft (877 m)
- Speed: 50.1 mph (80.6 km/h)
- Duration: 3:00
- Capacity: 1000 riders per hour
- Height restriction: 48 in (122 cm)
- Trains: 2 trains with 11 cars; riders arranged 2 across in a single row for a total of 22 riders per train
- Fast Lane available
- Apocalypse: The Ride at RCDB

Apocalypse: The Ride, formerly known as Terminator Salvation: The Ride, is a wooden roller coaster located at Six Flags Magic Mountain in Valencia, California. Manufactured by Great Coasters International, the roller coaster opened to the public on May 23, 2009. It is located in The Underground section of the amusement park on a plot of land formerly occupied by the Psyclone (1991–2007), Shockwave (1986–1988) and Sarajevo Bobsleds (1984–1986). It was the first wooden coaster to feature onboard audio, and its Terminator theme was short-lived following a corporate restructuring by Six Flags in 2011.

== History ==
=== Terminator Salvation: The Ride (2009–2010) ===
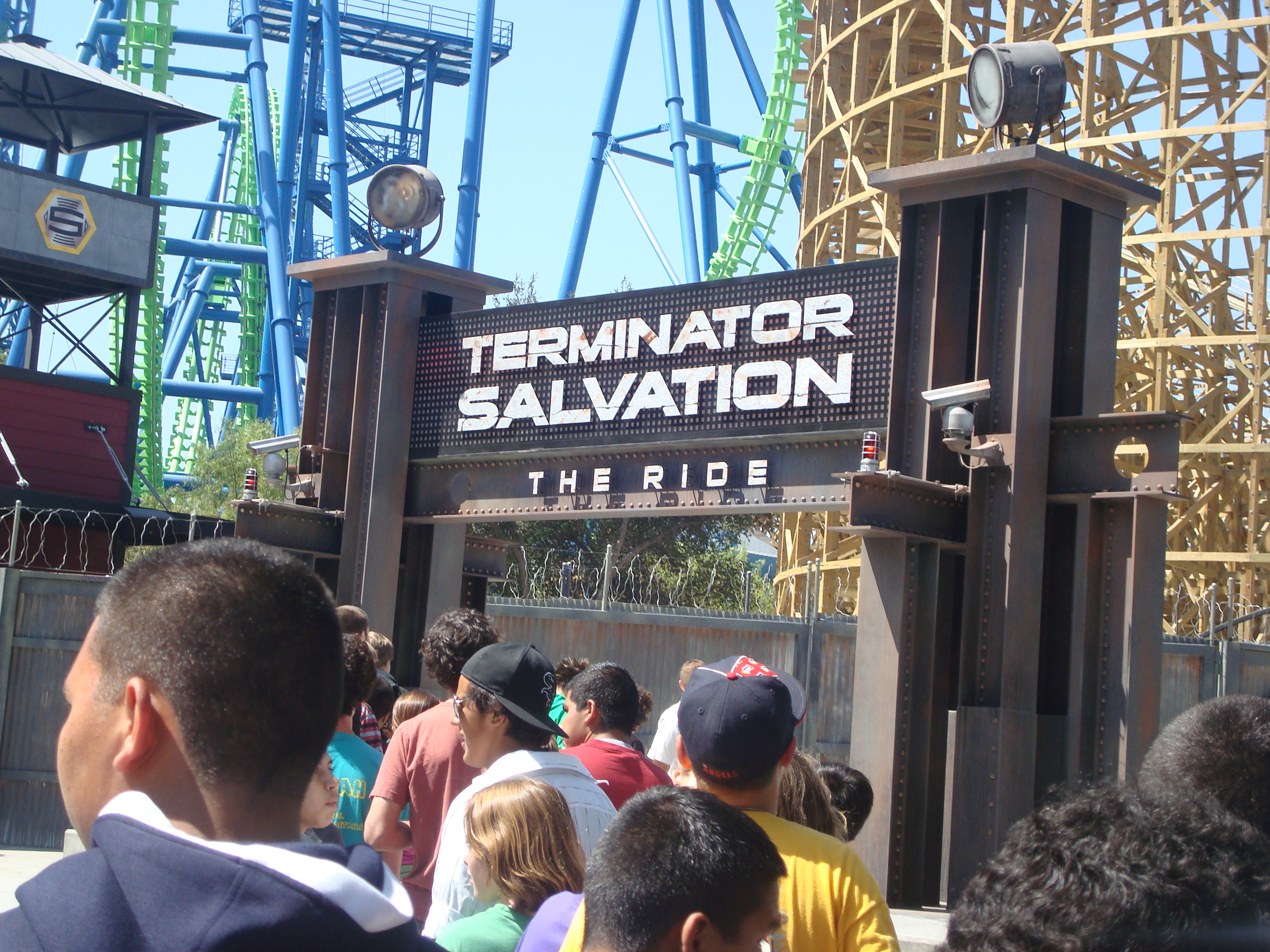
Entrance of Terminator Salvation: The Ride

Terminator Salvation: The Ride was originally announced as Terminator: The Coaster, but the name was later changed to coincide with the then-upcoming Terminator Salvation movie. Six Flags spent approximately $1 million on the ride's theme surrounding the film, most of which was placed in the line queue area. Guests waiting in line would also enter a preshow theater complete with video footage that featured actors from the film. The theme's storyline focused on trainees in a post-apocalyptic setting getting trapped by attacking machines at the amusement park, and the coaster serves as transportation to a safe house location. During the ride, the train would pass by pyrotechnic fireball effects and through three tunnels filled with a fog-like cooling mist. Each train also featured onboard audio, considered a first for a wooden roller coaster.

Terminator Salvation: The Ride debuted to the media on May 21, 2009, and opened to the public two days later. The onboard audio stopped working in early 2010 and was not repaired or replaced, although the rest of the ride's special effects remained intact.

=== Apocalypse (2011–present) ===
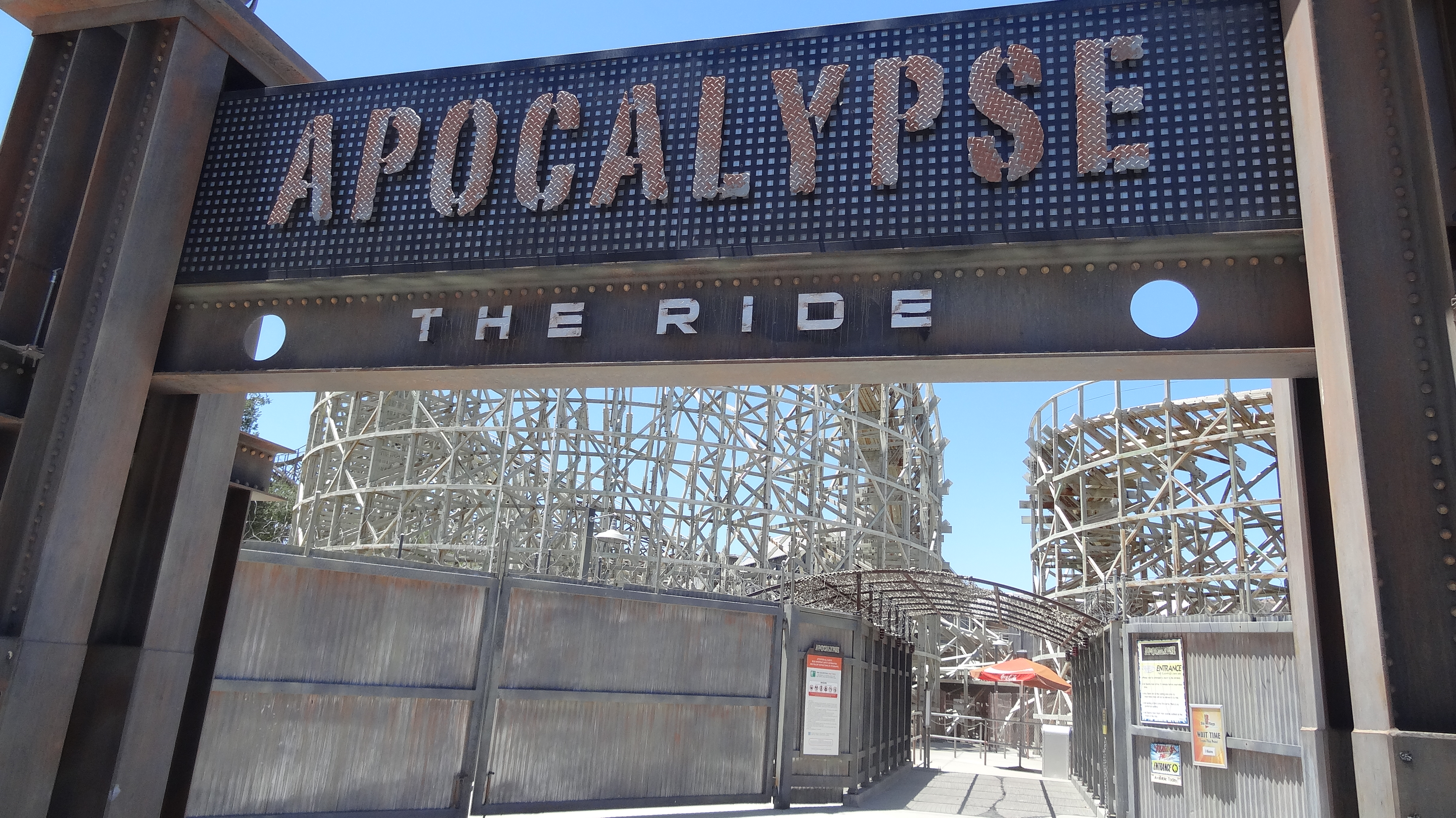
Updated entrance to Apocalypse

In late 2010 following a post-bankruptcy restructuring, Six Flags announced that it would be moving away from intellectual property licensing agreements, aside from those involving DC Comics, Hanna-Barbera and Looney Tunes. The initiative involved rebranding Terminator Salvation: The Ride to a more generic theme as a cost-saving measure. On January 8, 2011, the roller coaster began operating as Apocalypse the Ride. Terminator animatronics and themes were removed from the queue, the ride received new signage, and new video was created for the preshow room. The updated storyline centers around survivors of a global war taking refuge in a bunker, with the coaster offering a way to get there. Apocalypse retained the existing pyrotechnic and fog effects featured under the previous theme.

In 2015, Six Flags announced that Apocalypse would be temporarily renamed Shadows of Evil: The Ride as part of Activision's partnership to support the upcoming release of the highly anticipated Call of Duty: Black Ops III on November 6. The ride would be named after the game's Zombies mode. Its story would transport guests to the 1940s Film Noir-inspired Morg City, including zombie encounters and more. This lasted during the 2015 Fright Fest event from September 26 to November 1.

In early 2017, Apocalypse temporarily closed for a major re-tracking and refurbishment. The ride reopened in May 2017. Following an announcement in 2018 revealing a new roller coaster, West Coast Racers, Magic Mountain closed Apocalypse and the area it resides in. It reopened in September 2019 prior to the planned debut of West Coast Racers.

== Ride experience ==
=== Queue ===
Guests enter an industrial military research compound following a post-apocalypse. After passing underneath the entrance, guests cross a bridge over a drainage ditch. A right turn leads to the first switchback section. Some of the portions are surrounded in shading areas with rectangular tan roofs. Guests walk underneath the tracks and head into the next area, which features a jeep, barrels, water tanks and plants. On busier days, there will be an employee that controls the merge and only lets so many people beyond this point at a time, who then pass under the track again and into another holding area, just outside the pre-show building. In between the second and third switchback areas is a guard tower. Guests then gather in the staging area and as the doors open, they head into a warehouse with the first pre-show and multiple electronic devices. After this pre-show is over, guests walk through a hallway and watch the second pre-show on the television monitors. The next room features the third pre-show, yellow racks and cables. While the ride was called Terminator Salvation: The Ride, these racks held the upper torsos of Terminator robots, as if they were rolling through the assembly line. They would even roll back and forth a few inches in each direction as the guests were standing there. Following this area, guests climb up the stairs that lead to the loading station.

=== Layout ===
As the train exits the station, riders make their way through a 180-degree left turn and begin climbing a 95-foot (29 m) chain lift hill. At the top, the train turns left and drops 87.3-foot (26.6 m), reaching 50.1 miles per hour (80.6 km/h). The train speeds underneath the exit bridge followed by a right-handed banked turn. Riders drop towards the first drop and turn left, passing by a fire effect mounted in the engine compartment of a truck. After the fire effect, the train zooms through the Sector 3 Transport Tunnel, the first two tunnels. Inside, there are red lights and fog effects. This tunnel also wraps around the outside of the first drop. Upon exiting the Sector 3 Transport Tunnel, the train flies through the station. Then, riders go through the Sector 12 Transport Tunnel. After this, the train emerges on the other side of the ride and moves through a 360-degree right turn around the queue line. Riders pass under the second tunnel and make a 360-degree left turn into the final brake run. The train slowly makes a left turn past the maintenance shed and transfer track. After a left turn, riders return to the station, where they exit the train.

== Awards ==
Apocalypse: The Ride was ranked in the Amusement Today's Golden Ticket Awards for best new ride of 2009 with 7% of the vote, to come in fourth place.

Golden Ticket Awards: Best New Ride for 2010
Ranking	4

Golden Ticket Awards: Top wood Roller Coasters
Year									1998	1999
Ranking									–	–
Year	2000	2001	2002	2003	2004	2005	2006	2007	2008	2009
Ranking	–	–	–	–	–	–	–	–	–	43
Year	2010	2011	2012	2013	2014	2015	2016	2017	2018	2019
Ranking	27	36 (tie)	28	49	–	–	–	–	–	–
Year	2020	2021	2022	2023	2024	2025	2026			
Ranking	N/A	–	–	–	–	–	–			
