= Alpine Sleigh Ride =

Former amusement ride in Texas

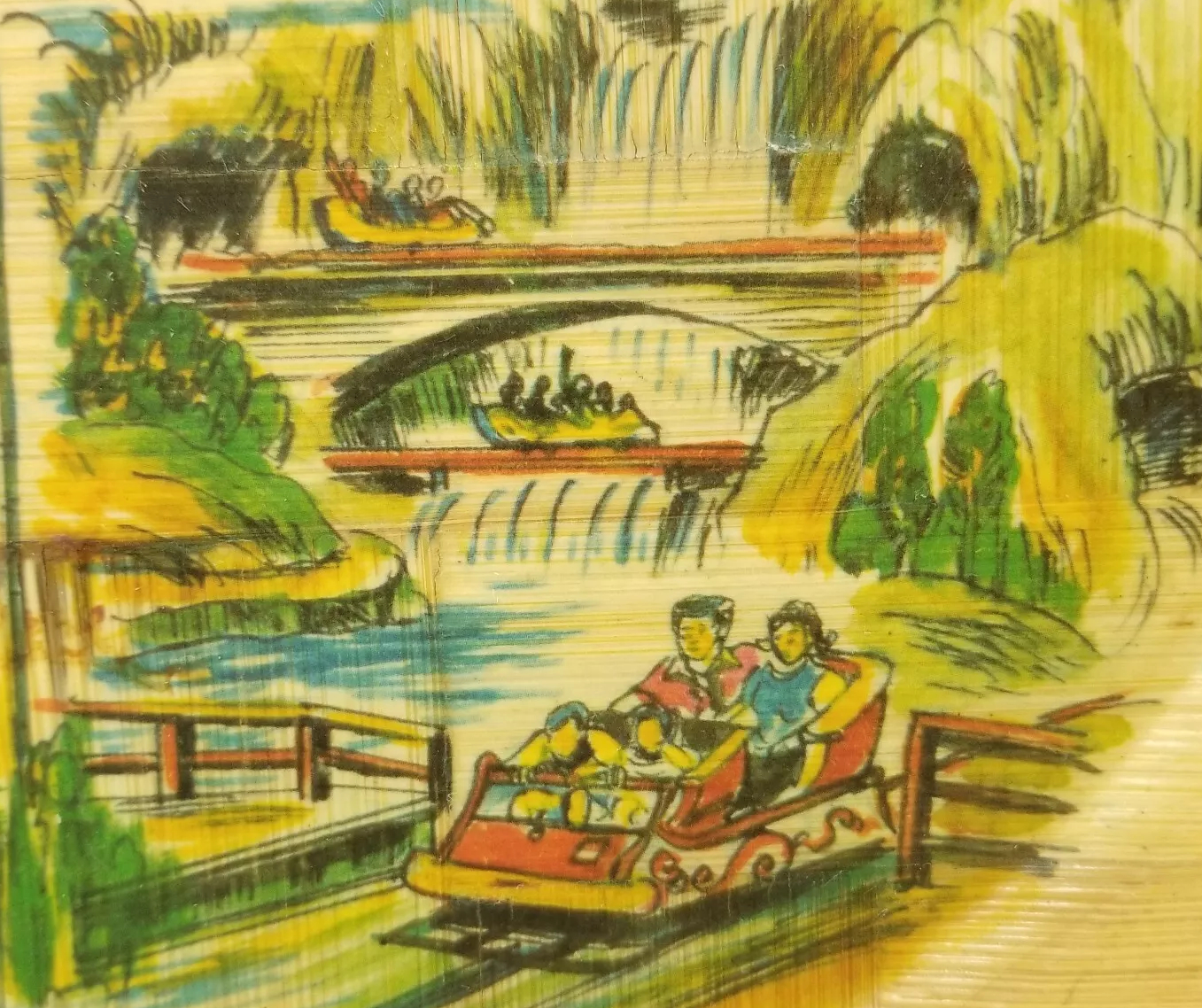

Six Flags AstroWorld
- Coordinates: 29.6755°N 95.4074°W
- Status: Removed
- Opening date: June 1, 1968
- Closing date: 1983
- Replaced by: Batman The Escape

The Alpine Sleigh Ride was a dark ride located in the Alpine Valley section of AstroWorld in Houston, Texas. It was one of the original attractions of the park and operated from 1968 until the end of the 1983 operating season. Featuring a ride control system and vehicles (ArrowGlide) designed by Arrow Dynamics, the attraction's initial concept and design was by amusement park planner and architect Randall Duell. Duell’s company had been hired by Judge Roy Hofheinz to plan AstroWorld. The attraction took riders through an alpine themed forest before reaching the show building which was designed to resemble a large mountain capped with snow.

The ride had elements of both a dark ride and a roller coaster. During the first part of the ride, the sleighs moved through a pine forest, past a towering waterfall, and into the “Der Hofheinzberg” mountain. The second half of the ride took riders through dark tunnels and icy caverns. A waterfall cascaded from atop the mountain and down into a catch pool below. After passing the waterfall, the sleigh themed vehicles entered the mountain's base and traveled through various chambers and tunnels inside. These included an echo-tunnel, an avalanche room with simulated snow, an appearance by an "abominable snowman" character, and a chamber themed with "Alpie" characters, among others. The avalanche room kept cooled down to approximately 10 °F (−12 °C) and contained an elaborate snow machine. This system was developed for the park by Carrier, the company responsible for Astroworld’s famous “outdoor air conditioning” in the park’s queues and other areas. In the Cold Room were two giant air curtains blowing down onto the track from above, one at the entrance of the room and one at the exit. After passing through the second level inside the mountain, the vehicles would exit and travel around the exterior of the mountain themed show building. Exterior features included the high bridge passing in front of the waterfall and a downhill canyon run. Vehicles were powered by an electrical bus bar along sections of track that ascended, and they were gravity powered along the descents which featured several surprise drops.

Closed due to high maintenance costs in 1983, the attraction became part of the Enchanted Kingdom children's area, and later part of the Batman The Escape.

== See also ==
- History of Houston
