= Excalibur (Six Flags AstroWorld) =

Defunct roller coaster

Six Flags AstroWorld
- Location: Six Flags AstroWorld
- Coordinates: 29.675°N 95.407°W
- Status: Removed
- Opening date: 1972
- Closing date: 1998

General statistics
- Type: Steel – Mine Train
- Manufacturer: Arrow Dynamics
- Model: Mine Train
- Lift/launch system: Chain lift hill
- Height: 88 ft (27 m)
- Drop: 80 ft (24 m)
- Length: 2,637 ft (804 m)
- Speed: 46 mph (74 km/h)
- Inversions: 0
- Duration: 2:51
- Trains: 2 trains with 5 cars. Riders are arranged 2 across in 3 rows for a total of 30 riders per train.
- Excalibur at RCDB

Excalibur was a mine train roller coaster at Six Flags AstroWorld in Houston, Texas. Built by Arrow Dynamics, the ride opened in 1972 as Dexter Frebish's Electric Roller Ride, until the name was changed in 1980. At the time of its closure, it was the 2nd oldest roller coaster at the park after Serpent.

== Ride experience ==
After leaving the station, the ride would turn right, entering a tunnel that doubled as a storage area for extra trains for the coaster. Riders would then enter the lift hill and would turn around before finally going through the first drop. The ride would then go through a banked left turn before going through a left downward helix. Riders would then turn left again before going down a slight drop and over a bunny hop. Another banked turn to the right would lead riders to another bunny hop followed by another banked drop to the right. Finally, the coaster would enter the brake run, leading riders back into the station.

== Closure ==
At the end of the 1998 season, Excalibur was removed in order to be sent to Frontier City in Oklahoma City, Oklahoma. Between the dismantling process and the shipping to Frontier City, the ride was damaged and would end up never being built at the park. The trains were eventually sent to Six Flags Over Texas and the track for the ride was scrapped in 2005. The same year Excalibur was scrapped, Six Flags AstroWorld would shut down for good.
