= Coney Island Cyclone =

Wooden roller coaster in New York City

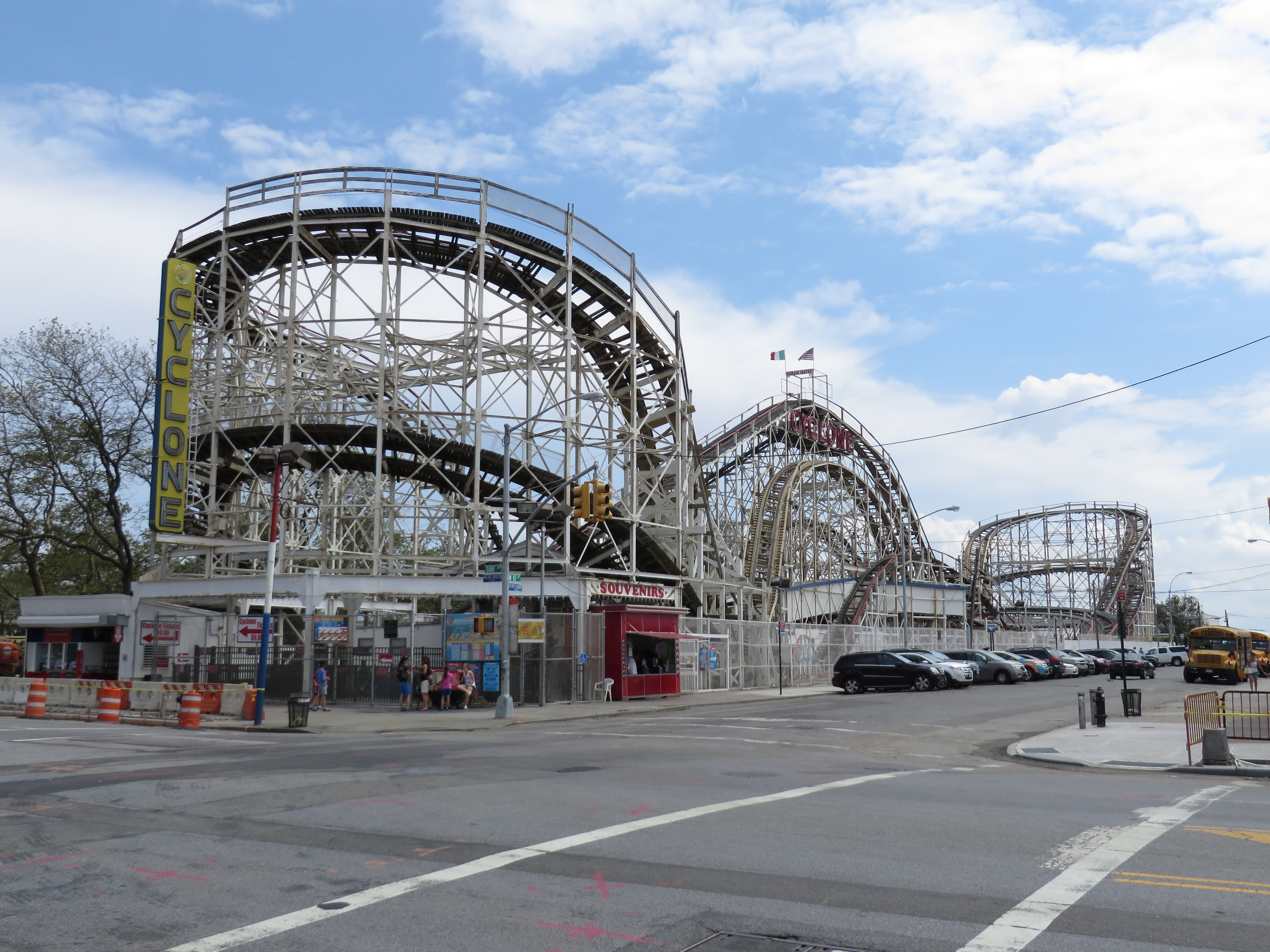
- Seen from Surf Avenue in 2013

Luna Park, Coney Island Brooklyn, New York, U.S.
- Location: Luna Park, Coney Island; Brooklyn, New York, U.S.
- Coordinates: 40°34′27″N 73°58′40″W
- Status: Operating
- Opening date: June 26, 1927; 99 years ago
- Cost: $175,000
- Replaced: Giant Racer

U.S. National Register of Historic Places
- Designated: June 25, 1991
- Reference no.: 91000907

New York State Register of Historic Places
- Designated: June 13, 1991
- Reference no.: 04701.000501

New York City Landmark
- Designated: June 12, 1988
- Reference no.: 1636

General statistics
- Designer: Vernon Keenan
- Track layout: Triple out-and-back
- Lift/launch system: Chain lift
- Height: 75 ft (23 m)
- Length: 2,640 ft (800 m)
- Speed: 60 mph (97 km/h)
- Inversions: 0
- Duration: 2:30
- Max vertical angle: 58.1°
- Capacity: 1440 riders per hour
- G-force: 3.75
- Height restriction: 54 in (137 cm)
- Trains: 3 trains with 3 cars; riders arranged 2 across in 4 rows for a total of 24 riders per train
- Pay-per-use attraction
- Coney Island Cyclone at RCDB

The Cyclone, also called the Coney Island Cyclone, is a wooden roller coaster at Luna Park in the Coney Island neighborhood of Brooklyn in New York City. Designed by Vernon Keenan, it opened to the public on June 26, 1927. The roller coaster is on a plot of land at the intersection of Surf Avenue and West 10th Street. The Cyclone reaches a maximum speed of 60 miles per hour (97 km/h) and has a total track length of 2,640 feet (800 m), with a maximum height of 75 feet (23 m). (Note: Some sources cite a height of 85 ft (26 m), though the Roller Coaster DataBase reports that this is the measurement to the sign above the lift hill and that track is 10 ft (3 m) shorter.)

The roller coaster operated for more than four decades before it began to deteriorate, and by the early 1970s the city planned to scrap the ride. On June 18, 1975, Dewey and Jerome Albert, owners of the adjacent Astroland amusement park, entered an agreement with New York City to operate the ride. The roller coaster was refurbished in the 1974 off-season and reopened on July 3, 1975. Astroland Park continued to invest millions of dollars in the Cyclone's upkeep. The roller coaster was declared a New York City designated landmark in 1988 and was placed on the National Register of Historic Places in 1991. After Astroland closed in 2008, Cyclone Coasters president Carol Hill Albert continued to operate it under a lease agreement with the city. In 2011, Luna Park took over the Cyclone.

== History ==
Coney Island was the largest amusement area in the United States from about 1880 to World War II, attracting several million visitors per year. At its height, it contained three amusement parks (Luna Park, Dreamland, and Steeplechase Park) and many independent amusements. The Cyclone site was occupied by the Giant Racer from 1911 to 1926.

=== Early history ===
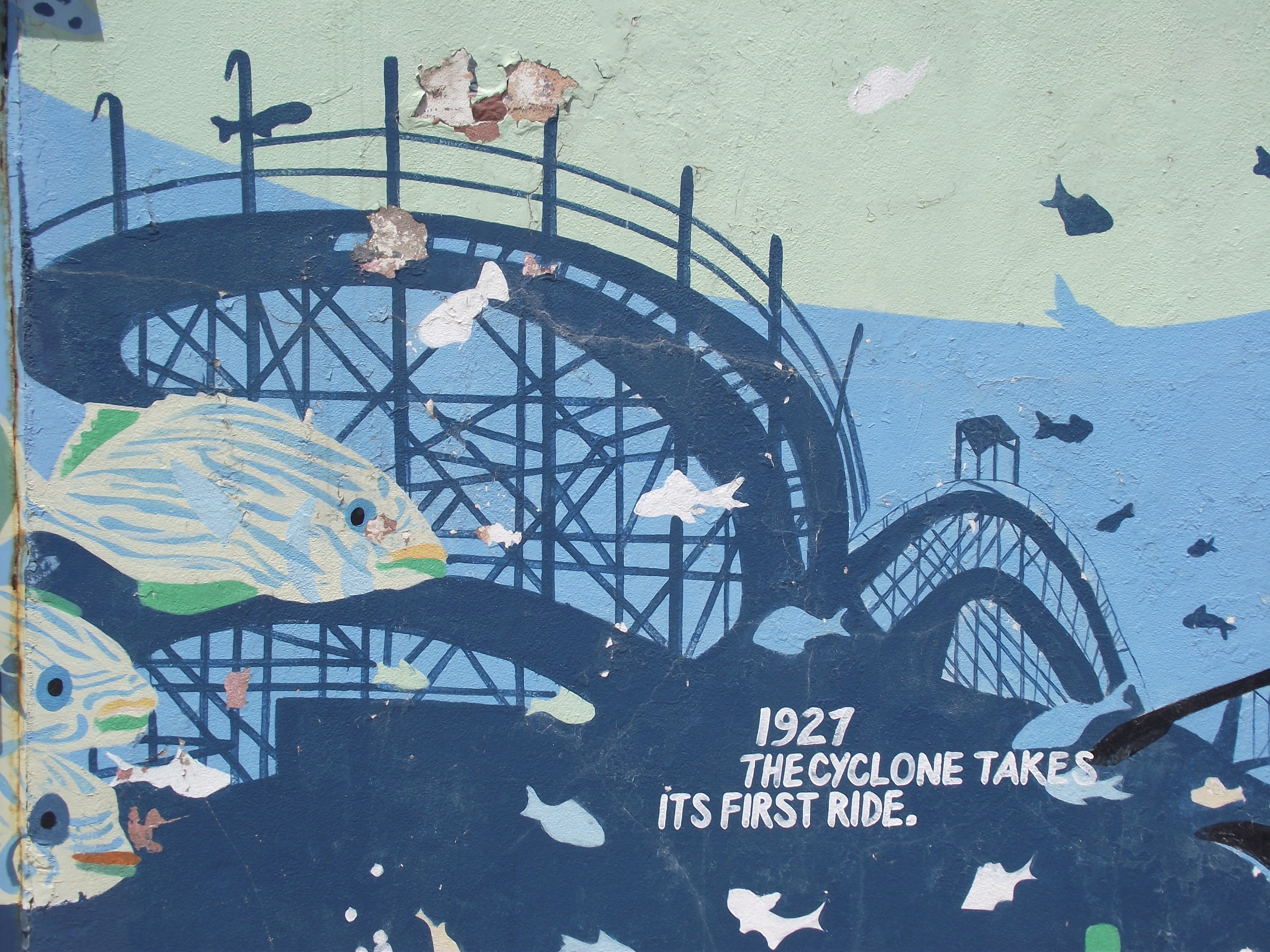
South wall of the New York Aquarium, commemorating the Cyclone's 1927 opening

The success of the Thunderbolt and Tornado roller coasters, which respectively opened in 1925 and 1926, led Irving and Jack Rosenthal to acquire land at the intersection of Surf Avenue and West 10th Street for a coaster of their own. The Rosenthal brothers leased a land lot for 19 years from the Coast Holding Company, a syndicate composed of "many prominent business and amusement men of Coney".

With a $100,000 investment, they hired leading coaster designer Vernon Keenan to design a new ride. Harry C. Baker supervised the construction, while local companies provided the material, including steel contractor National Bridge Company and lumber contractor Cross, Austin, & Ireland. Its final cost was reportedly $146,000 to $175,000. When the Cyclone opened on June 26, 1927, a ride cost 25 cents (equivalent to $4.63 in 2025), except on Sundays and holidays, when the Rosenthals charged 35 cents. With the success of the Cyclone, the Rosenthals installed a similar ride at Golden City Park in Canarsie, Brooklyn, in 1928.

In 1935, the Rosenthals took over the management of New Jersey's Palisades Park. The Cyclone was placed under the supervision of Christopher Feucht, a Coney Island entrepreneur who had built Drop the Dip in 1907. Feucht performed minor retracking work on the Cyclone The ride's first drop was reduced by 5 feet (1.5 m) in 1939. By that time, New York City parks commissioner Robert Moses planned to clear a 100-foot-wide (30 m) area inland of the Riegelmann Boardwalk, which would have required the relocation or closure of the Cyclone. These plans were subsequently modified to preserve the amusement area there. The ride remained extremely popular. A person with dwarfism would originally zap disembarking riders with an electric paddle, a practice which ended during the 1950s.

=== Decline ===
Sylvio and Al Pinto acquired the Cyclone in March 1959. By the 1960s, attendance at Coney Island was declining. Increased crime, insufficient parking, poor weather, and the post-World War II automotive boom were all cited as contributing factors in the decline. Coney Island's last remaining large theme park, Steeplechase Park, was closed in 1964 and subsequently demolished. The Cyclone was sold to the New York City Department of Parks and Recreation (NYC Parks) in 1965. Around that time, the New York City government wanted to construct an expansion to the New York Aquarium, which had been constructed east of the Cyclone in 1954. The city began planning to acquire the Cyclone via eminent domain in 1967. Its owners, East Coaster Corporation, unsuccessfully fought the city; they did minimal long-term maintenance, enough to keep the ride operating safely. The city bought the Cyclone for $1.2 million in 1969.

The Cyclone was then operated under contract by East Coaster Corporation while the city worked with the New York Aquarium on plans to redevelop the site. There was a lack of long-term maintenance by the city, and the coaster soon received 101 safety violations. In 1972, aquarium officials announced that they would replace the Cyclone with a swamp display. Opponents of the plan organized a "Save the Cyclone" campaign to contest the proposed demolition of the coaster. This created a conflict between the aquarium, which supported the Cyclone's demolition, and the Coney Island Chamber of Commerce, which opposed it. The owners of the AstroWorld theme park in Houston were considering buying the Coney Island Cyclone and moving it to Houston. This was eventually rejected as being too expensive, and AstroWorld's owners instead built a replica, which they branded as the Texas Cyclone.

By 1974, city officials doubted their decision to purchase the Cyclone and considered leasing the coaster to a private operator. The proposed demolition of the Cyclone was seen as potentially disastrous to Coney Island's economy. The city changed its plans to dismantle the coaster and, in April 1975, invited sealed bids to lease operation of the ride. The owners of the Astroland amusement park won the lease, with a bid of $57,000 per year. After Astroland spent $60,000 to refurbish the Cyclone, the coaster reopened on July 3, 1975.

=== Preservation ===
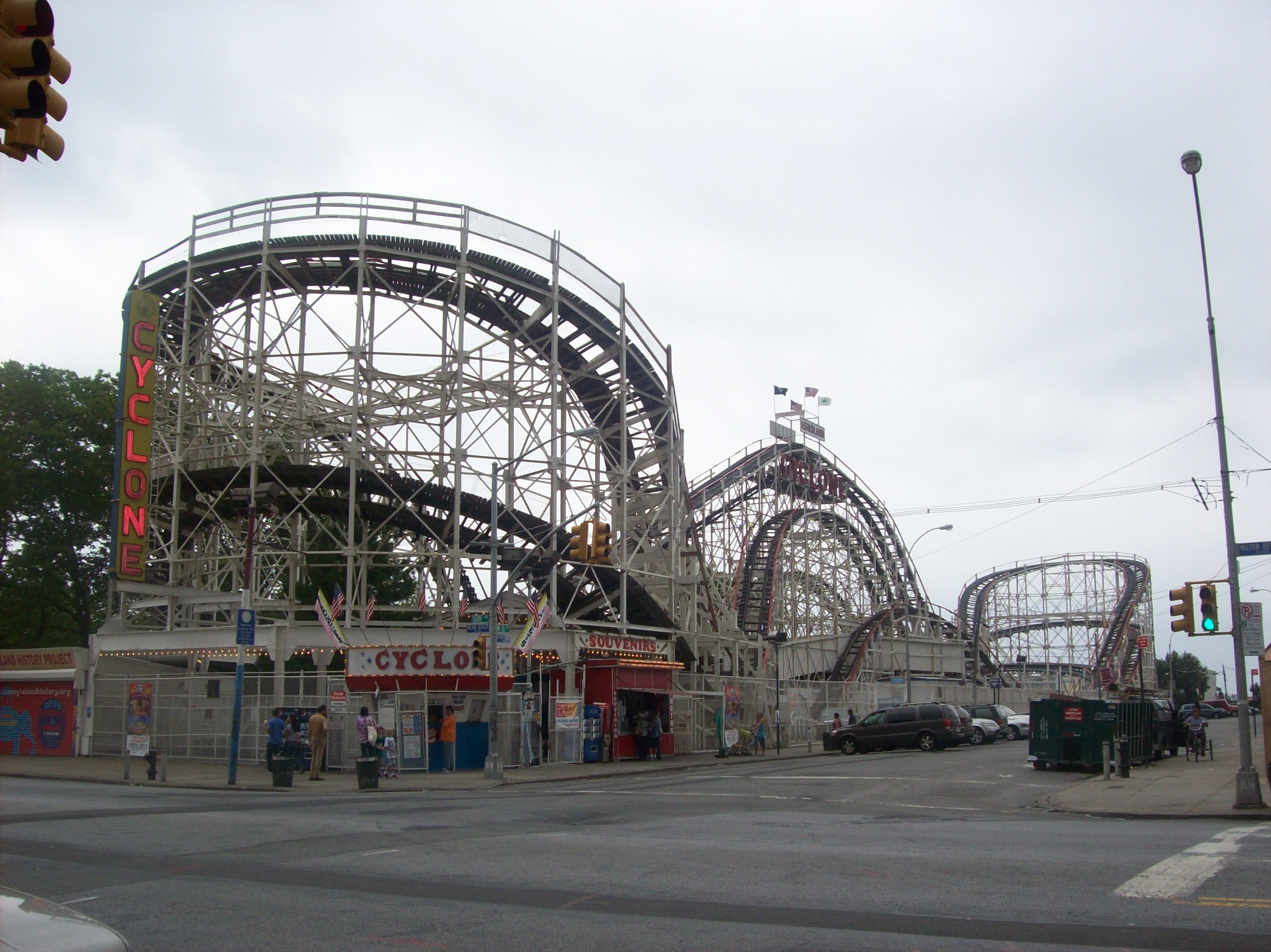
The Cyclone in 2010

During the 1986 season, insurance disputes forced the Cyclone to stay closed until July. The Cyclone remained in operation as a separate enterprise following the 2008 closure of Astroland and during the single operating season of Dreamland in 2009.

The adjacent Luna Park took over management of the Cyclone in 2011 and began a major refurbishment of the coaster during the off-season. The ride had not been refurbished since the 1970s, and various planks and other elements of the structure had come loose. Although Luna Park officials said the Cyclone's maximum speed and layout would remain unchanged, roller coaster enthusiasts expressed concern that the refurbishment would make the ride experience smoother, saying that the Cyclone's roughness was a major characteristic of the ride. Luna Park hired Great Coasters International (GCI) to refurbish the roller coaster.

The roller coaster remained largely intact after the surrounding area was flooded during Hurricane Sandy in late 2012. GCI completed its refurbishment of the Cyclone in 2016. The Cyclone did not operate during the 2020 season due to the COVID-19 pandemic in New York City; it reopened during the 2021 season.

== Characteristics ==
The wooden roller coaster (Note: The Roller Coaster DataBase cites the ride as being a hybrid roller coaster. The track is made of wood, while the support structure is made of steel.) covers 75 feet (23 m) at 834 Surf Avenue and 500 feet (150 m) on West 10th Street, which is owned by NYC Parks. The former concession stands (built into the coaster's structure) was home to the Coney Island History Project, which was moved to a space near the Wonder Wheel. A souvenir stand selling Cyclone-based shirts, hats, and on-ride photos remains. The Cyclone is considered an "irreplaceable" structure, since timber-supported coasters can no longer be built under modern New York City building codes.

The track is 2,640 feet (800 m) long, including six fan turns and twelve drops. The ride's top speed is 60 miles per hour (97 km/h), and each ride takes about one minute and fifty seconds. The brown wooden track has red wood fencing alongside it and has a white structural framework, giving it a distinctive appearance. The steel framework is composed of vertical I-beams, horizontal tie bars, and diagonal cross-bracing beams, connected by riveted steel plates. "Cyclone" appears in large, red, incandescent letters on the east and west sides of the lift hill; the letters on this sign were originally 10 feet (3.0 m) high. The coaster is surrounded by a fence. Before 2000, the Cyclone's 58.1-degree initial drop was the third-steepest drop of any wooden coaster in the world. As of 2014, it has the ninth-steepest drop of any wood coaster worldwide.

The Cyclone has three trains, each with three cars; one train can run at a time. Riders are arranged two across in four rows, for a total of 24 riders per train. The trains have bench seating (rather than individual seats for each passenger), and a single-position lap-bar restraint system which drops across the entire row. The seats do not have headrests.

The Cyclone is a pay-per-use attraction, since each ride in Luna Park charges a number of credits for admission. Ride admission is also included in Luna Park's fixed-date and any-date passes. "Bonus credits" accumulated by the purchase of ride credits cannot be used for the coaster. The station is accessed from the ticket booth on West 10th Street. It consists of two wooden platforms, one on each side of the track; the outer (western) platform is for riders who are boarding, and the inner (eastern) platform is for exiting riders. The station is under a gable roof canopy supported by a steel arch frame, which has segmented arcades along its sides. A mechanical room is partly underneath, and next to, the platform. Outside the station is a vertical sign with incandescent letters spelling "CYCLONE", which measures 45 feet (14 m) high.

== Ride experience ==
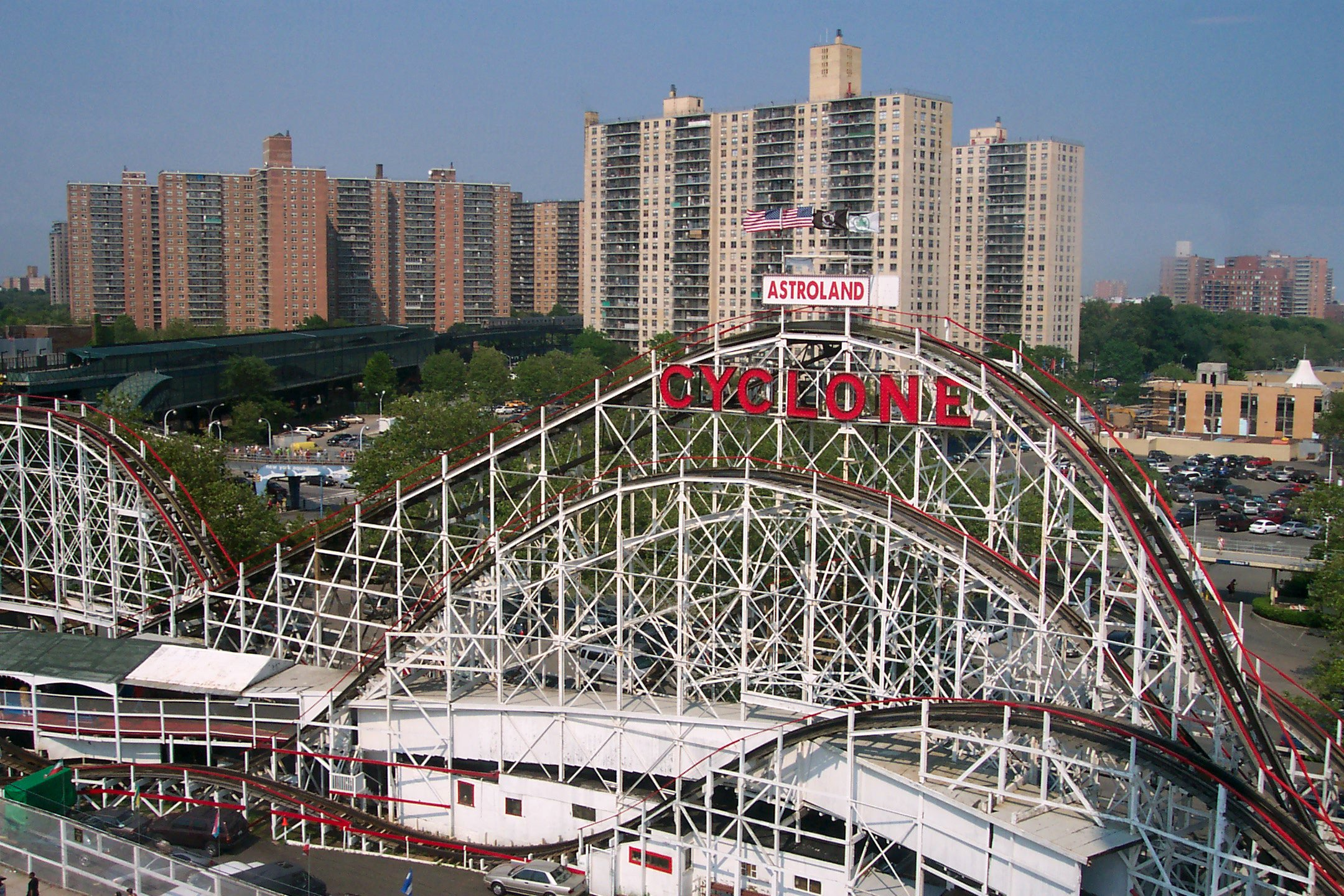
Seen from the west

The train leaves the station heading north and immediately turns right at an almost 180-degree angle, which leads to an 75-foot (23 m) lift hill. It then moves over the first 58.1-degree drop; as the train reaches the bottom of the drop, it comes close to the track above for a headchopper effect. The train then ascends into the first high-speed U-turn to the left, descending again beneath the lift hill and rising to the second 70-foot-tall (21 m) U-turn to the right. It descends parallel to the lift hill, enters a camelback hill and rises to a smaller banked right U-turn, where it dives under the first high-speed curve. After the third U-turn, the train enters a second camelback hill with a fan turn and a smaller airtime section as it approaches a fourth U-turn to the right. The train hops several times more, paralleling the second drop, before entering a final right curve. It drops slightly, ascends into a tunnel with a small left fan turn, and enters a brake run just before re-entering the station.

== Incidents ==
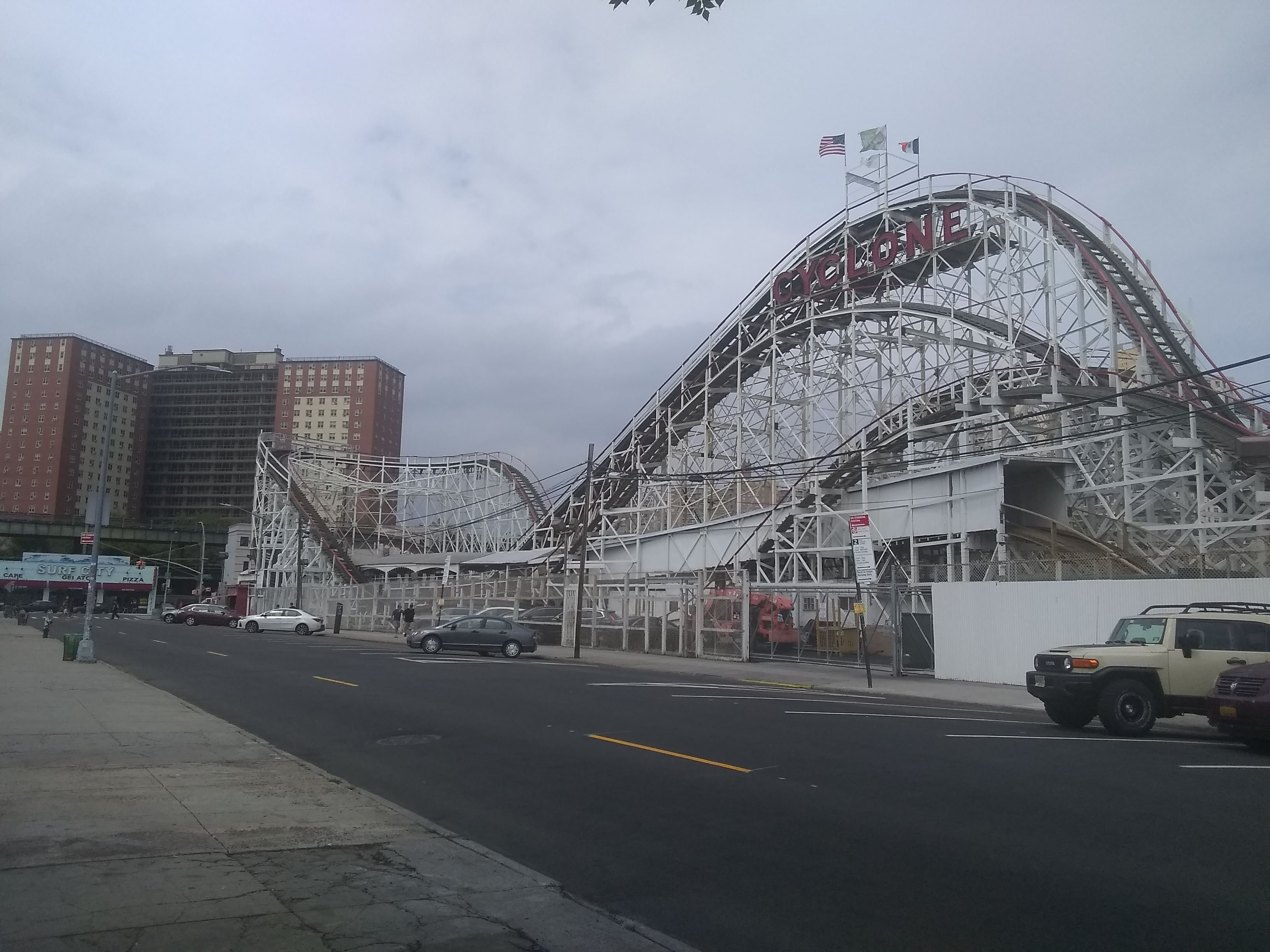
The ride seen from West 10th Street

At least three people have died after riding the Cyclone. On May 26, 1985, a 29-year-old man was killed when he stood up and hit his head on a crossbeam. On August 23, 1988, a 26-year-old maintenance worker, riding in the back seat during his lunch break, was killed after falling 30 feet (9.1 m) from the coaster and landing on a crossbeam of a lower section of track. Witnesses reported that he was standing up while riding. The ride was closed after the incident but reopened a day later after safety inspectors concluded it was safe. Keith Shirasawa, a 53-year-old man, suffered several crushed vertebrae in his neck while riding the Cyclone on July 31, 2007, and died four days later due to complications during surgery.

On June 12, 2008, a woman rode the Cyclone and later claimed that she had been seriously injured due to the ride. She was awarded $1.5 million in damages in 2015, despite being found partly at fault.

On August 22, 2024, the Cyclone was halted mid-ride upon discovery of a crack in the lift hill chain's sprocket, forcing the evacuation of several riders without injury. The New York City Department of Buildings (DOB) subsequently issued Luna Park two violations for failure to maintain the ride and immediately notify the DOB of the incident. The Cyclone was repaired and reopened two weeks later on September 7.

== Notable riders and records ==
Aviator Charles Lindbergh was said to have ridden the Cyclone two years after it opened, and reportedly called the experience "greater than flying an airplane at top speed". Emilio Franco, a mute coal miner with aphonia, visited Coney Island in 1948 and reportedly screamed while going down the Cyclone's first drop. Franco also reportedly said, "I feel sick" as his train returned to the station. According to multiple accounts, he fainted after realizing that he had spoken. Although one version of the story reported that Franco had been mute since birth, a contemporary New York Times story said that he had been mute for five years.

Michael Boodley, future co-founder of Great Coasters International, set a record in 1975 for the most consecutive trips on the Cyclone, riding it 1,001 times over a 45-hour period. Nineteen-year-old Richard Rodriguez broke the record from August 18 to 22, 1977, riding the coaster for 104 hours. He took short bathroom breaks between rides, eating hot dogs and M&Ms and drinking shakes during the ride itself. Rodriguez broke his own record for the longest roller-coaster marathon in 2007, riding for 405 hours and 40 minutes at Blackpool Pleasure Beach in the United Kingdom. In 2009, the Coney Island History Project gave an award to Howie Lipstein, who had ridden the Cyclone for 50 consecutive years. In 2019, Luna Park honored him for riding for 60 consecutive years.

== Impact ==
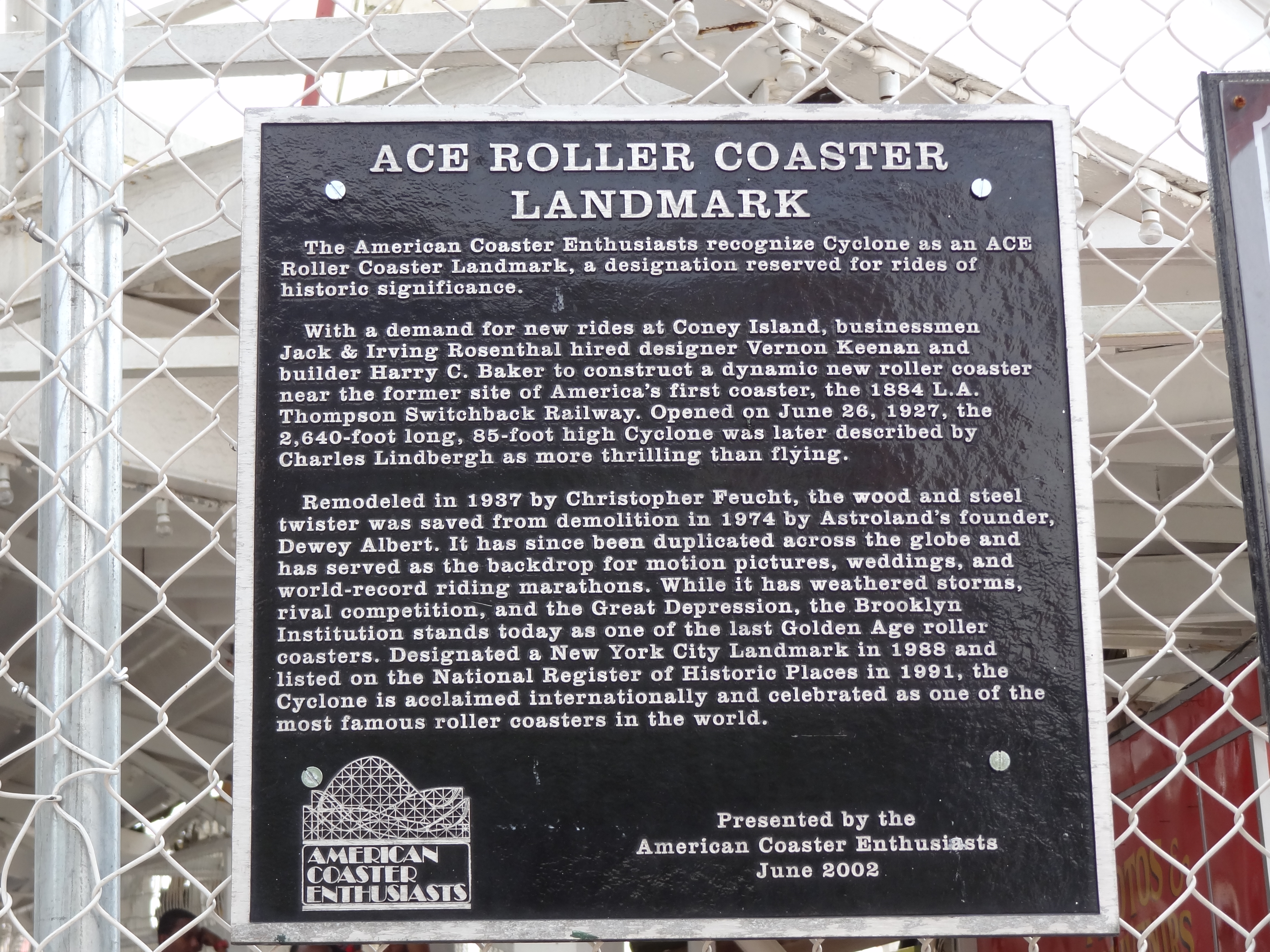
American Coaster Enthusiasts plaque

The Cyclone was named a city landmark in 1988 and a National Historic Landmark in 1991. An ACE Coaster Classic and Coaster Landmark, it inspired the name of the Brooklyn Cyclones baseball team, which plays at nearby Maimonides Park. In 2025, the Cyclone was nominated for the Las Culturistas Culture Award for Most Iconic Building or Structure.

=== Replicas ===
The popularity of the Cyclone has inspired eight replica coasters that share (or mirror) a similar layout. Four replicas of the Cyclone were built at Six Flags parks: Viper at Six Flags Great America; Psyclone at Six Flags Magic Mountain; the Texas Cyclone at Six Flags AstroWorld; and the Georgia Cyclone at Six Flags Over Georgia. Of these, only Viper is still operational in its original state. (Note: The Texas Cyclone was demolished with AstroWorld's closure in 2005, Psyclone was demolished in 2007, and the Georgia Cyclone was converted by Rocky Mountain Construction into Twisted Cyclone in 2018.) International replicas include Bandit at Movie Park Germany; the defunct White Canyon at Yomiuriland in Japan, and the defunct Aska at Japan's Nara Dreamland.

The Riverside Cyclone, built in 1983 at Riverside Amusement Park (now Six Flags New England), was inspired by the design of the Coney Island Cyclone. Later known as the Cyclone, it was closed in 2014 and replaced with Wicked Cyclone, constructed by Rocky Mountain Construction. Despite the shared name, the Riverside Cyclone was not a replica of the Coney Island Cyclone.

=== Rankings ===
Golden Ticket Awards: Top wood Roller Coasters
Year									1998	1999
Ranking									7	8
Year	2000	2001	2002	2003	2004	2005	2006	2007	2008	2009
Ranking	11	11	13	16	16	14	16	14	16	14
Year	2010	2011	2012	2013	2014	2015	2016	2017	2018	2019
Ranking	13	15	14	19	22	16	27	22	29	28
Year	2020	2021	2022	2023	2024	2025	2026			
Ranking	N/A	13 (tie)	17	16	12	15	16			

== See also ==
- Amusement rides on the National Register of Historic Places
- List of New York City Designated Landmarks in Brooklyn
- National Register of Historic Places listings in Brooklyn

== Notes ==
Preceded by Giant Dipper	World's Fastest Roller Coaster; June 1927 – April 1976	Succeeded by Screamin' Eagle
