= Astroneedle =

Defunct gyro tower

AstroNeedle

Six Flags Astroworld
- Status: Removed
- Opening date: 1968
- Closing date: 1999

Ride statistics
- Attraction type: Gyro tower
- Manufacturer: Willy Bühler Space Towers Company
- Model: Gyro tower
- Height: 340 ft (100 m)

AstroNeedle was a 340-foot-tall gyro tower located in Houston's Six Flags Astroworld, in the U.S. state of Texas. The ride opened in 1968 and was located in the amusement park's European Village section. The landmark closed in 1999 and was dismantled in February 2000, five years before the park closed permanently. The ride was to be relocated to Six Flags Mexico in Mexico City but never commenced. It was the tallest ride in the park when it was completed, as well as one of the tallest rides in the world when it opened in 1968.

== Ride experience ==
The ride featured a double-decker cabin with 32 passengers each level, giving a 360-panoramic view of the park. The original cabin was supplied by Von Roll, then later retrofitted with an Intamin cabin in 1979.

== History ==
Construction for the tower started in 1967, and opened in 1968. It opened as one of the original attractions when Six Flags Astroworld opened in 1968. The ride originally opened as Skyrama, then later renamed to AstroNeedle.

The ride originally had a gold paint scheme, but then later repainted white in the late 1970s.

The ride closed in 1999, then dismantled in February 2000. The ride was to be relocated to Six Flags Mexico in Mexico City, with intentions of being utilized at said park.
