= Sky Screamer (Six Flags AstroWorld) =

Defunct Intamin Freefall ride

Six Flags AstroWorld
- Area: Plaza de Fiesta
- Coordinates: 29.675°N 95.407°W
- Opening date: 1983
- Closing date: 1997

Ride statistics
- Manufacturer: Intamin
- Model: Freefall
- Height: 131 ft (40 m)

Sky Screamer was a first-generation Intamin Freefall ride at Six Flags AstroWorld in Houston, Texas. Opening in 1983, the ride was closed and dismantled in the late 1990s.

Sky Screamer consisted of a 131 feet (40 m) tower with a horizontal braking runout. It featured eight gondolas, each holding four riders.

== Description ==
The gondola used one set of wheels to go up the lift and down the drop (four large wheels at each back corner) However, it used a second set of wheels in the transfer and loading and unloading area of the ride. These were smaller rollers located on the bottom of the gondola.

The ride lifted gondola up through a shaft in the tower's center by a lift chain. Once at the top, the gondola was disengaged from the lift chain and pushed forward into the drop position. After the sounding of the klaxon, the gondola was released into freefall. The freefall drop into the horizontal curve applied a g-force of 4.5 on the riders.

A pair of guide rails ran downward along the outside of the Sky Screamer tower before curving into the horizontal braking runout.

== Modifications ==
In late 1983, 50% more anti-rollback devices were installed on Sky Screamer. The additional anti-rollbacks were staggered on each side of the lift. These modifications were intended to improve stopping ability in wet conditions and were a response to an accident on a similar ride at a different park. In 1986, the Sky Screamer "G-Block" was moved farther down the horizontal braking runout. The end of "H-Block" was extended to the beginning of the station conveyors in 1994.

Sky Screamer was dismantled sometime after 1997.
