= Psyclone (roller coaster) =

Defunct ride at Six Flags Magic Mountain

- Promotional image for Psyclone

Six Flags Magic Mountain
- Location: Six Flags Magic Mountain
- Coordinates: 34.420985°N 118.600252°W
- Status: Removed
- Opening date: March 23, 1991
- Closing date: 2006
- Cost: $5 million
- Replaced: Shockwave
- Replaced by: Apocalypse: The Ride

General statistics
- Type: Wood
- Manufacturer: Dinn Corporation
- Designer: Curtis D. Summers
- Track layout: Twister
- Lift/launch system: Chain lift hill
- Height: 95 ft (29 m)
- Drop: 77 ft (23 m)
- Length: 2,970 ft (910 m)
- Speed: 50 mph (80 km/h)
- Inversions: 0
- Duration: 1:50
- Max vertical angle: 53°
- Capacity: 1200 riders per hour
- G-force: 3
- Height restriction: 48 in (122 cm)
- Trains: 2 trains with 6 cars. Riders are arranged 2 across in 2 rows for a total of 24 riders per train.
- Psyclone at RCDB

Psyclone was a wooden roller coaster located at Six Flags Magic Mountain in Santa Clarita, California. Designed by Curtis D. Summers and constructed by the Dinn Corporation, the roller coaster opened to the public on March 23, 1991. Psyclone's design was modeled after the well-known Coney Island Cyclone roller coaster, a historical landmark located at Coney Island in New York City. It featured eleven hills, five high-speed banked turns, and a 183-foot-long (56 m) dark tunnel. Bolliger & Mabillard, a company that builds steel roller coasters, manufactured the trains for Psyclone.

== History ==
Following the debut of Georgia Cyclone at Six Flags Over Georgia in 1990, Six Flags again hired Curtis D. Summers and Charles Dinn of Dinn Corporation to design and construct a similar wooden roller coaster at Six Flags Magic Mountain. Georgia Cyclone had caused multiple injuries in the short time since its opening and had to undergo several modifications to tone down the ride's profile. For Magic Mountain, Six Flags requested a gentler version.

On December 27, 1990, Six Flags Magic Mountain announced that Psyclone would be added to the park. It would be located towards the back of the park in the former site of Shockwave.

Summers incorporated eleven hills and five banked turns into the design of Psyclone. It was constructed of unpainted, Southern Yellow pine and opened to the public on March 23, 1991.

=== Decline ===
The ride sustained structural damage after the Northridge earthquake in 1994 and though repaired to operate safely again, the ride dynamics suffered greatly in regard to vehicle tracking. Major modifications happened, including adding trim brakes that slowed the trains down to the point of making the trains crawl through each turn. A 2006 poll of roller coaster enthusiasts ranked Psyclone 178th out of 179 wooden roller coasters worldwide.

On January 23, 2007, the park announced that Psyclone along with Flashback would be removed from the park for future expansion. The following month after the announcement, Psyclone was demolished and piles of wood remained at the site for several days until construction walls were erected at the site. According to RCDB, Psyclone last operated in 2006. Apocalypse: The Ride opened in its place in 2009.
