= Southern Star Amphitheatre =

Closed amphitheatre

- Interactive map of Southern Star Amphitheatre
- Location: Houston, Texas
- Coordinates: 29.6755°N 95.4074°W
- Owner: Six Flags AstroWorld

Construction
- Opened: 1985
- Closed: October 30, 2005
- Demolished: 2006

Southern Star Amphitheatre was an amphitheatre located at AstroWorld in Houston, Texas. It opened in the southeast corner of the theme park in 1985. The venue was frequented by notable performers including The Beach Boys and Kansas. Prior to the Southern Star opening, concerts were held in the same area on a flat field with the stage at the east end. The Southern Star saw a decline in the number of top-billed acts when the Cynthia Woods Mitchell Pavilion opened in 1990. Reserved seating was available and a grassy lawn was provided to guests with general admission. The venue closed along with the theme park in 2005.

== Concerts ==
Act	Date	TBA1	TBA2	Source	Notes
The Grass Roots	May 7, 1971			A	predates Southern Star Amphitheater
Anne Murray	November 9, 1973			B	predates Southern Star Amphitheater
Crosby, Stills & Nash	August 26, 1977			B	predates Southern Star Amphitheater
The Beach Boys	June 19, 1982			B	predates Southern Star Amphitheater
Joan Jett and the Blackhearts	July 8, 1982			B	predates Southern Star Amphitheater
Blue Öyster Cult	July 16, 1982			B	predates Southern Star Amphitheater
John Cougar Mellencamp	August 20, 1982			A	predates Southern Star Amphitheater
Kansas	July 16, 1983			A, B	predates Southern Star Amphitheater
Huey Lewis & The News	May 4, 1984			B	predates Southern Star Amphitheater
Billy Idol	May 26, 1984			A	predates Southern Star Amphitheater
Cheap Trick	June 2, 1984			B	predates Southern Star Amphitheater
Heart	June 16, 1984			A	predates Southern Star Amphitheater
Bryan Adams	May 12, 1985			A	
John Denver	May 18, 1985			A	
Howard Jones	June 15, 1985			A	
Kenny Loggins	July 12, 1985			A	
Crosby, Stills & Nash	July 14, 1985			A	
Power Station	July 19, 1985			A	
David Sanborn	August 1, 1985			A	
Paul Young	August 3, 1985			A	
Dire Straits	August 17, 1985			A	
Heart	August 18, 1985			A	
REO Speedwagon	August 29, 1985				
Grateful Dead	August 30, 1985			A	
Wham!	September 4, 1985			A	
Tears for Fears	September 15, 1985			A	
Squeeze	September 21, 1985			A	
AC/DC	October 12, 1985			A	
Night Ranger	October 25, 1985			A	
Jefferson Starship	October 25, 1985			A	
Adam Ant	October 26, 1985			A	
Simple Minds	April 5, 1986			A	
Robert Palmer	June 6, 1986			A	
Bob Dylan	June 20, 1986			A	
Tom Petty	June 20, 1986			A	
The Monkees	June 27, 1986			A	
Mike and the Mechanics	June 28, 1986			A	Opening band was "Keep it Dark"
Depeche Mode	June 29, 1986			B	
Joe Jackson	July 6, 1986			A	
Julian Lennon	July 12, 1986			A	
The Cure	July 20, 1986			B	
Emerson, Lake and Powell	August 10, 1986			B	
The Moody Blues	September 21, 1986			A	Opening band was The Fixx
Steve Winwood	October 5, 1986			A	
Bruce Hornsby	October 5, 1986			A	
Crowded House	May 1, 1987			B	
Howard Jones	May 9, 1987			A	
The Bangles	June 5, 1987			A	
The Monkees	July 18, 1987			A, B	
"Weird Al" Yankovic	July 18, 1987			B	
Depeche Mode	May 14, 1988			B	
Richard Marx	July 29, 1988			A	
Throwing Muses	April 21, 1989			B	
New Order	April 21, 1989			B	
New Kids on the Block	July 2, 1989			A	
Fine Young Cannibals	September 30, 1989			A	
Morrissey	June 19, 1991				
"Weird Al" Yankovic	August 14, 1992			B	
Glenn Frey & Joe Walsh	July 2, 1993			A	
The Flaming Lips	November 27, 1993			B	
Selena	July 31, 1994			A	
Ringo Starr	May 25, 1997			A	
Alice Cooper	October 3, 1998			A	
Delirious?	March 30, 2002			B	

- Source A is: http://www.rockinhouston.com/venues/astroworld-southern-star/604/
- Source B is: http://www.setlist.fm/venue/astroworld-houston-tx-usa-3bd6d840.html
