= Texas Cyclone =

Defunct roller coaster

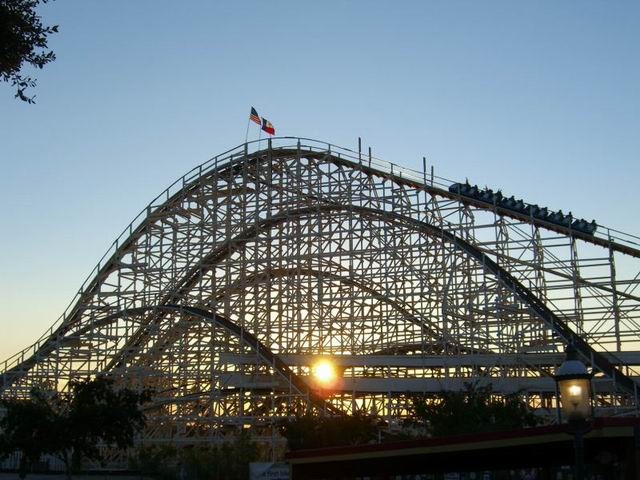
- A Texas Cyclone train ascending the lift hill

Six Flags AstroWorld
- Location: Six Flags AstroWorld
- Coordinates: 29°40′36″N 95°24′35″W
- Status: Removed
- Opening date: June 12, 1976
- Closing date: October 30, 2005

General statistics
- Type: Wood
- Manufacturer: Frontier Construction Company
- Designer: Don Rosser, William Cobb
- Track layout: Cyclone
- Lift/launch system: Chain lift hill
- Height: 93 ft (28 m)
- Drop: 80 ft (24 m)
- Length: 3,180 ft (970 m)
- Inversions: 0
- Duration: 2:15
- Max vertical angle: 53°
- Height restriction: 48 in (122 cm)
- Trains: 6 cars. Riders are arranged 2 across in 2 rows for a total of 24 riders per train.
- Texas Cyclone at RCDB

Texas Cyclone was a wooden roller coaster at the defunct Six Flags AstroWorld in Houston, Texas. Designed by Don Rosser and William Cobb, it was manufactured by Frontier Construction Company and opened to the public on June 12, 1976. Well-known for its airtime, the roller coaster was 93 feet (28 m) tall, 3,180 feet (970 m) long, and had a ride time of two minutes and fifteen seconds. Texas Cyclone was modeled after the original Coney Island Cyclone, which AstroWorld had originally intended to purchase and move to their park before realizing the process would be too expensive.

== History ==
In the 1970s the Coney Island Cyclone was in a state of disrepair and was in danger of being demolished to expand the nearby New York Aquarium. AstroWorld did not have a wooden roller coaster at the time, and the owners attempted to buy and move it to Houston. After further study, the owners decided that a move would be prohibitively expensive, and so settled on building a replica of it.

AstroWorld hired William Cobb to design the replica of the Cyclone. He created a mirror image of it, which was also larger and faster than the original. During its construction, which was done by the Frontier Construction Company, the north end turnaround was damaged by a tropical storm, which delayed its opening until 1976. When it first opened, it was one of the tallest and fastest wooden coasters in the world. In 1979, the first turn was lowered by two feet to prevent stalling, so that it could operate safely in higher winds.

On July 29, 1983, an accident occurred in which one park employee was killed and several injured during a test run of the coaster. A new train was being added to increase ride capacity due to the large crowds. This process involves moving a section of track (transfer track) and manually moving a train from a storage/work area up into the station. The transfer track is moved back to the running position and the roller coaster capacity is doubled by running 2 trains. In this accident, the manager who took charge of the procedure forgot to move the track back into the running position. The train was loaded with employees and dispatched. The train went back through the storage shed, where it careened off the end of the work track killing an employee and injuring 14 others on the train. No one on the ground was injured.

=== Closure and demolition ===
In September 2005, Six Flags announced that AstroWorld would be permanently closed and would not reopen for its 2006 season. The coaster was demolished on March 9, 2006. The Texas Cyclone trains were shipped to La Ronde in Montreal, Quebec, Canada and can be seen in the middle of Le Monstre. A small section of the track was also removed after the ride had closed and sent to the National Roller Coaster Museum in Texas, where it is currently stored.
