= Six Flags AstroWorld =

Defunct theme park in Houston, Texas, U.S.

- Previously known as AstroWorld (1968-1975)

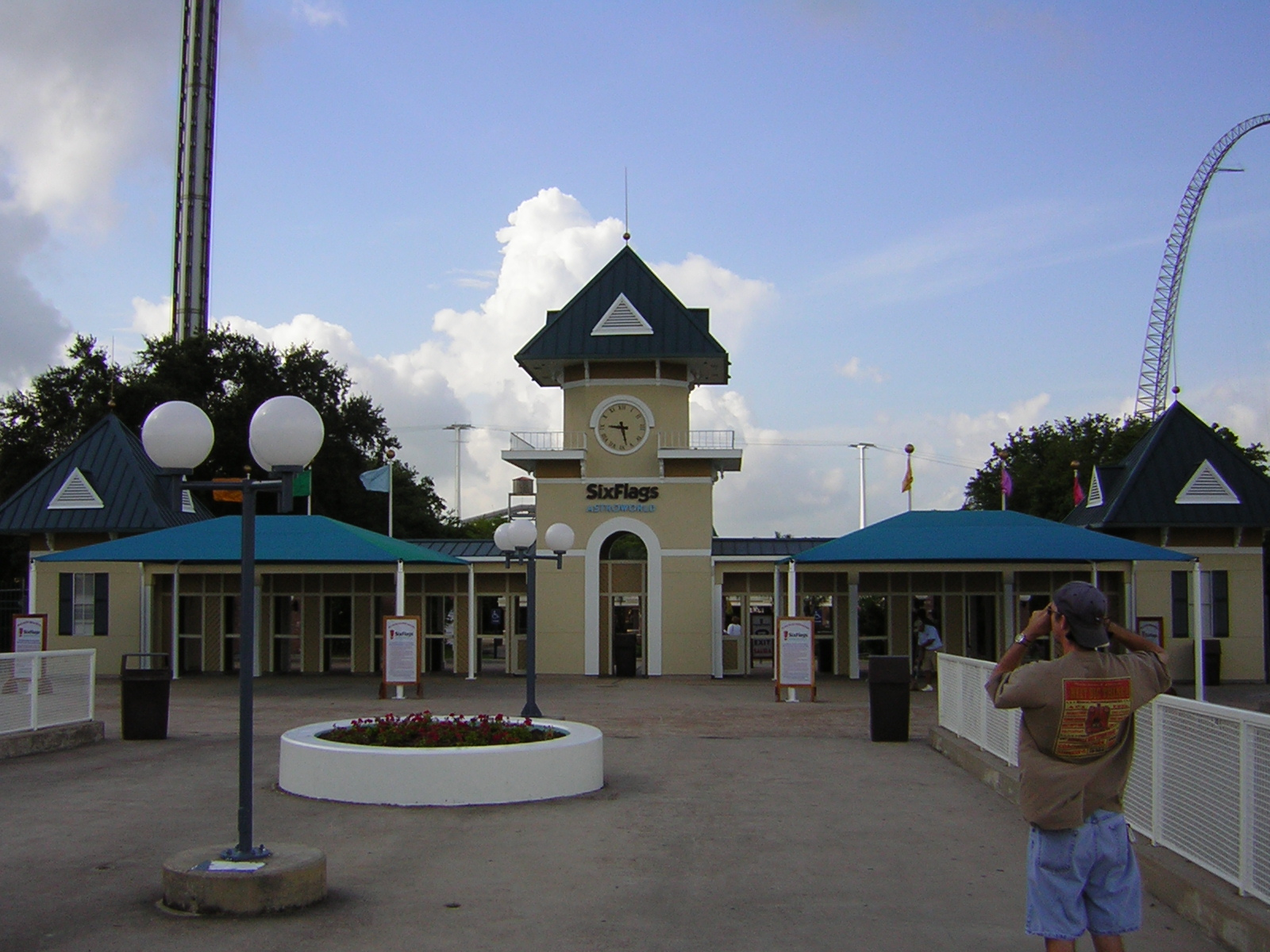
- Entrance gate, 2004, one year before demolition

- Location within Texas
- Location: Houston, Texas, U.S.
- Coordinates: 29.6755°N 95.4074°W
- Status: Defunct
- Opened: June 1, 1968; 58 years ago
- Closed: October 30, 2005; 21 years ago
- Owner: Hofheinz family (1968–1975); Six Flags (1975–2005)

Six Flags AstroWorld, also known simply as AstroWorld, was a seasonally operated amusement park in Houston, Texas. Owned and operated by Six Flags, the park was situated between Kirby Drive and Fannin Street, directly south of I-610. The park opened on June 1, 1968, and was developed originally and constructed as part of the Astrodomain, the brainchild of local philanthropist and former Houston mayor Roy Hofheinz, who intended it to complement the Astrodome. The Hofheinz family sold AstroWorld to Six Flags in 1978.

Notable rides featured at the park included the Texas Cyclone, a wooden roller coaster built in 1976 that was modeled after the well-known Coney Island Cyclone, and Thunder River, considered the world's first successful river rapids ride when it opened in 1980. WaterWorld, an adjacent water park, was acquired and added to AstroWorld in 2002. Following declining revenue, rising property value, and other issues facing Six Flags, the company closed AstroWorld permanently after its final day of operations on October 30, 2005, the final night of Fright Fest. Many rides were sold at auction or relocated to other Six Flags' properties, and demolition of the remaining structures was completed by mid-2006.

== History ==
=== Planning and construction ===
Judge Roy Hofheinz, who was one of the original owners of the Houston Astros baseball team and spearheaded the lobbying effort that resulted in Harris County financing the construction of the Astrodome, founded the "Astrodomain" holding company after the Astrodome's opening in 1965. It owned 116 acres (47 ha) in south Houston surrounding the Astrodome. Hofheinz continued to develop the Astrodomain, creating AstroWorld (1968), the Astrohall convention center (which hosted twice-daily stagings of the Ringling Bros. and Barnum & Bailey Circus in 1969; Hofheinz had acquired the circus in December 1967), and four hotels with a capacity of 5,600 guests to serve visitors: the Astroworld Motor Hotel (with a private suite for Hofheinz on the ninth floor), Holiday Inn-Astroworld, Howard Johnson Motor Lodge-Astroworld, and Sheraton Inn-Astroworld.

In 1967, Hofheinz initially denied that preliminary work for an amusement park had been underway, but later announced on September 16 that approximately half of the remaining land, 57-acre (23 ha), was being developed for a park to be named "Astroworld". Hofheinz showed an architectural model of the park and announced that Randall Duell and Associates had designed it; Duell, a Hollywood set designer and architect, had previously designed Six Flags Over Texas. An initial $25 million investment paid for extensive landscaping and a long pedestrian viaduct spanning the I-610 freeway, the first privately owned, publicly accessible span over a federal highway. Lloyd, Morgan & Jones designed the bridge.

Additional design work for the park was performed by I. A. Naman & Associates (air conditioning); Lockwood, Andrews & Newnam (electrical); Walter P Moore (structural); Turner, Collie & Braden (civil engineering); and Linesch & Reynolds (landscape architects). 500,000 yd^{3} (380,000 m^{3}) of fill was required for the site, because of its low elevation and drainage issues. Dozier Specialty, who had previously worked on Colt Stadium, was the general contractor. The name AstroWorld was selected following Houston's designation as the home of the Johnson Space Center in 1965, paying homage to the nation's crewed space programs.

Executives commissioned Ed Henderson, a Disney animator, to build a scale replica of the park and design maps for park guests. Henderson's model of AstroWorld, measuring 8 by 10 feet (2.4 m × 3.0 m), was built as a publicity preview of the park in 1967. Architecture students at Rice University and the University of Houston sculpted many of the buildings. It was displayed in the window of Foley's, a downtown department store, then moved to Hofheinz's Astrodome suite once the park opened; as an Easter egg, a model of Hofheinz's black Cadillac is parked in a private lot in the northwest corner of the park's model. After the park closed in 2005, the model was discovered, sawed into six pieces in a warehouse, then returned to Henderson. He stored it in his garage before it was displayed in fall 2010 at the Optical Project gallery, operated by artists Bill Davenport and Francesca Fuchs. In 2011, it was sold to I. A. Naman and Associates, the same firm that had designed the park's outdoor air conditioning; they donated the model to the Houston Public Library.

=== Hofheinz family ===
AstroWorld early ephemera

Original logo, from bumper sticker

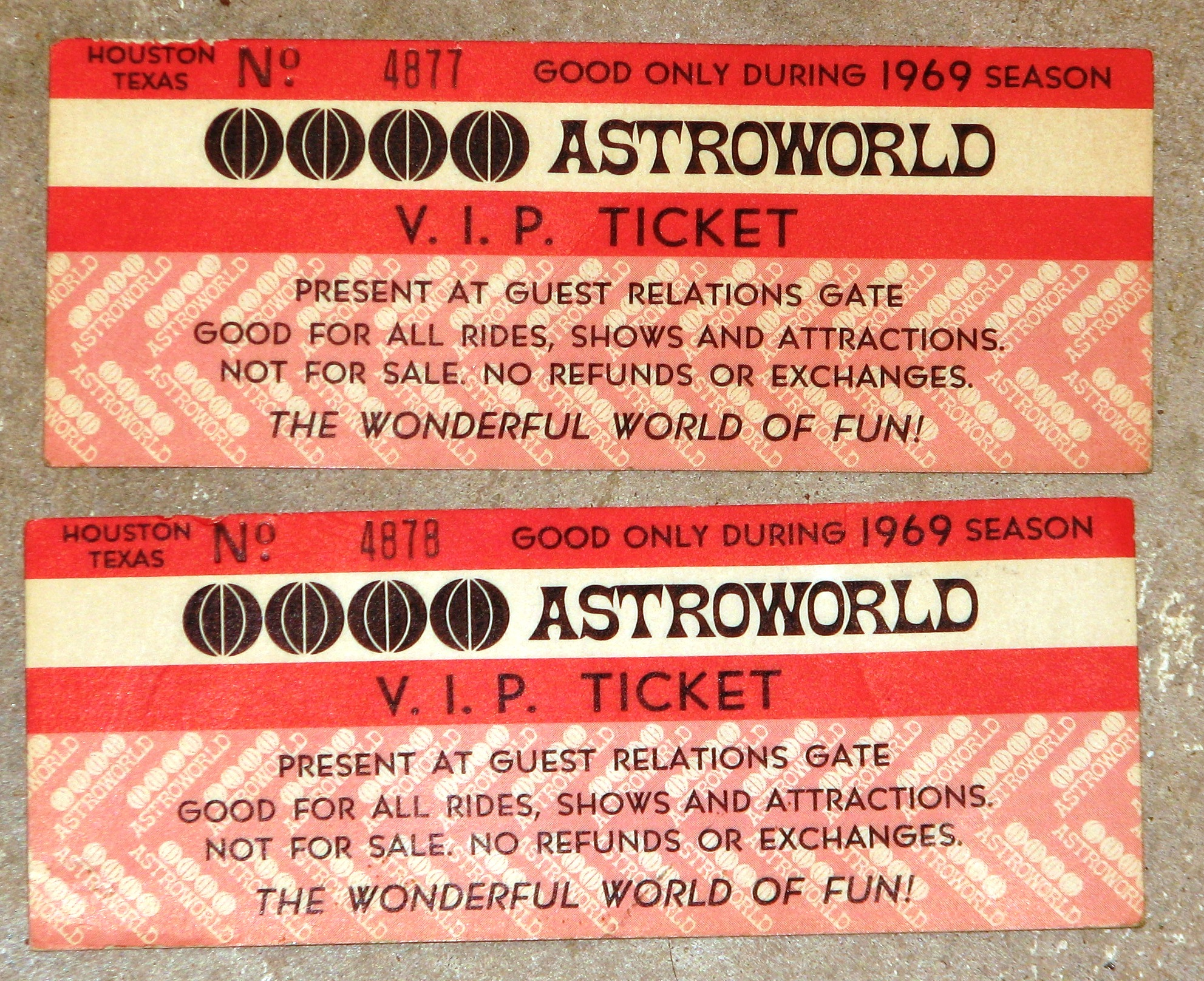
V.I.P. admission tickets, 1969

The Hofheinz family, Roy and his three children (Roy Jr., Fred, and Dene), shared ownership of the park. Hofheinz hosted a press preview in May 1968; Leonard Traube wrote the park "has a beautifully realized continuity and layout calculated to move traffic in such a way as to make practical the policy of a single gate admission for virtually everything on the grounds", referring to the Duell loop that routes visitors through each part of the park.

AstroWorld opened on June 1, 1968, just south of the Astrodome, creating a multi-facility entertainment complex; 50,000 guests visited the park during the first weekend. Hofheinz enlisted two of his grandchildren to launch the amusement park with the release of 2,000 balloons. An initial workforce of 1,200 collected tickets at a price of $4.50 for adults and $3.50 for children. Stan McIlvaine, who had formerly operated Six Flags Over Texas, was the first general manager of AstroWorld. Two of the park's sixteen attractions were not operational on opening day.

Marvel McFey, the park's official mascot (branded the "Ambassador of Happiness"), was introduced in 1972. He was accompanied by a menagerie of "animal gypsies": Winston Wolf (the sheriff of AstroWorld); Pigs One, Two, and Three (mischievous tricksters named Quiz, Chiquito, and Harpo); Percy Penguin; Pierre Le Rat (the resident artist); Flopper Rabbit (a country bumpkin); Beethoven Bear (a checkers champion); Samantha Skunk ("a bright purple and pink flower child"); Frieda Frog (McFey's secretary); and Lester Lion (a frustrated baseball player). In addition to their in-park greeting and show duties, Marvel and his caravan of Enchanted Animals represented AstroWorld at many civic functions. Rolly Crump designed and built the character costumes.

In 1970, just two years after the opening of Astroworld, Hofheinz survived a stroke that left him in a wheelchair. The enterprise announced a $38 million long-range financing program in 1972, with notes held by General Electric Credit Corp., Ford Motor Credit Co., and HNC Realty. Those creditors assumed control of the Astrodomain in 1974. Astrodomain sold the hotels to Servico Inc. in May 1976. Hofheinz liquidated his interest in the company a short time later.

=== Six Flags ===
Six Flags purchased a 20-year operating lease for AstroWorld in mid-1975. The park was renamed AstroWorld, A Six Flags Theme Park. The following year, Six Flags AstroWorld introduced a new, high-speed roller coaster, the Texas Cyclone. A new playground named "The Magical World of Marvel McFey" was added to Children's World for the 1977 season. That same year, Robert Cartmell named the Texas Cyclone the best roller coaster in the world. The formal purchase of AstroWorld by Six Flags concluded in 1978. In 1978, the new attraction was Greezed Lightnin', a high-acceleration loop roller coaster.

McFey's tenure as the park's mascot ended in 1984 as Bugs Bunny and other Looney Tunes characters moved into the Enchanted Kingdom for the 1985 season; AstroWorld's parent corporation, Six Flags, had acquired the license to use the Looney Tunes characters in 1984 for its theme parks from Marriott along with the Great America in Gurnee theme park; Marriott had held the license since 1976 for its twin Great America parks.

Six Flags continued to change ownership, being purchased by Bally Manufacturing in 1982, then by a private equity firm, Wesray Corporation, in 1987. Time Warner acquired a minority stake in 1990 and owned the company outright by September 1993. During Astroworld's first twenty years, it entertained more than thirty million visitors. The amusement park persisted while new competitors in Houston emerged and failed, including Busch Gardens, Hanna–Barbera Land, and SeaArama Marineworld. Attendance increased during these earlier years. In the early 1990s, the Six Flags parks gained access to DC Comics characters through its corporate owner, Time Warner; Batman: The Escape was installed at AstroWorld for the 1993 season. In 1994, the park was renamed Six Flags AstroWorld, as Six Flags branding shifted under the new management. In February 1998, Premier Parks, led by CEO Kieran Burke, acquired Six Flags Entertainment Corporation. In 1984, Premier, originally Tierco, a property management group, hired Gary Story to rehabilitate one of its properties, an older park named Frontier City in Oklahoma City; Story's successful turnaround of that park started the company's theme park acquisition program.

=== Closure and demolition ===
The Six Flags acquisition was part of an ambitious Premier Parks purchasing program, which bought 31 amusement parks in four years, including the 12 Six Flags parks. Burke received a $2 million bonus for completing the Six Flags acquisition. However, Six Flags failed to turn a profit for five straight years after the 1998 acquisition, announcing a $122 million loss for the first half of 2003; capital expenditures began to be scaled back because of its debt load. In August 2005, Six Flags announced it was selling its chain of parks. One month later, on September 12, Burke announced AstroWorld would be closed and demolished at the end of the 2005 season. The company cited issues such as dwindling attendance, rising property value, and conflicts involving off-site parking at Reliant Stadium, which houses the Houston Texans football team and the Houston Livestock Show and Rodeo (HLSR). In 1997, the combined attendance of AstroWorld and Water World was 2.27 million visitors; AstroWorld alone was ranked as the 28th most attended theme park in the United States with 1.99 million guests. AstroWorld attendance ranked 35th overall among all theme parks in 2000, 37th overall in 2002, 36th overall in 2003, and 39th overall in 2004, which was eighth among all Six Flags parks in 2004. A contractual agreement that allowed Six Flags patrons to park at Reliant Stadium expired in August 2005, and attempts to extend it failed. CFO Jim Dannhauser cited the expired parking arrangement as a "contributing factor" in the decision to close. Burke later explained in 2014 the decision was based on "[AstroWorld's] condition and location and the costs to modernize ... we had big offers pouring in for the land at the time and it just made more sense to close it." The final date of park operation was October 30, 2005. Following the closure, most of the park's assets, including rides and equipment, were sold during a three-day public auction held January 6–8, 2006.

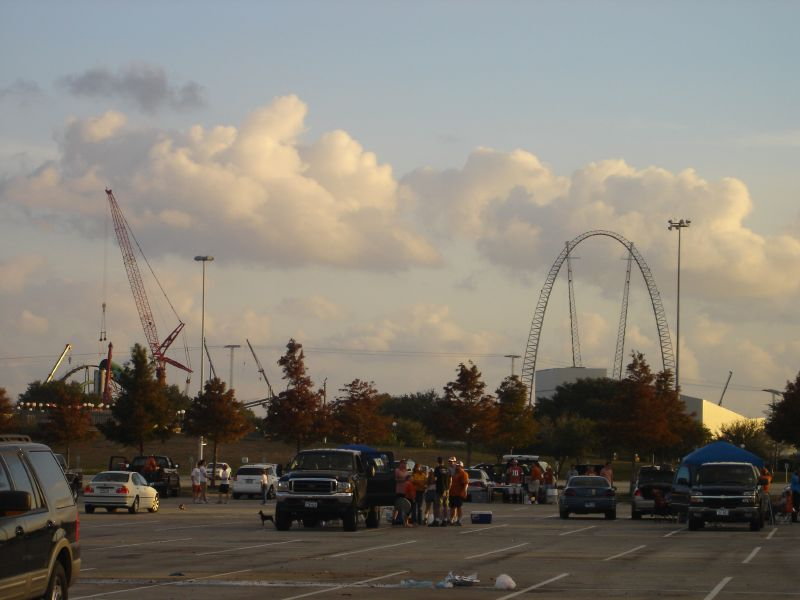
Demolition of Six Flags AstroWorld in December 2005

Company executives expected to sell the land for as much as $150 million, but ultimately received less than half that amount. After spending $20 million to demolish the park and clear the land, Six Flags sold the cleared property for $77 million in 2006 to Angel/McIver Interests, a land development firm based in Conroe, Texas. By that time, Burke had been removed as CEO. In 2009, the former Astroworld site was still vacant. The land tract was reported as taking up 104 acres (42 ha). The land owners hired real estate consultants, Croswell Torian Commercial Properties, to subdivide and market the property to other developers under the "SouthPoint" brand, though no development had yet occurred. The original 110-acre (45 ha) tract purchased by Hofheinz was reduced by 8 acres (3.2 ha): 5 acres (2.0 ha) were acquired by Harris County Metro and another piece of the tract on the northwest corner sold to a car dealership.

The Houston Livestock Show and Rodeo (HLSR) are the owners of a record-holding 102 acres (41 ha) of cleared land bounded by West Bellfort Drive, Fannin Street, Kirby Drive, and I-610. The original amusement park site occupied 57 acres (23 ha) of that. Parts of the tract were developed, and other parts were undeveloped; the HLSR was using some of that property for overflow parking and conveying those visitors over the long pedestrian viaduct, the last remnant of the former amusement park. Though the site includes a great field of grass, the land is stabilized and partly paved with asphalt, so it can be used for parking.

== Areas and attractions ==
Themed areas and key locations within AstroWorld

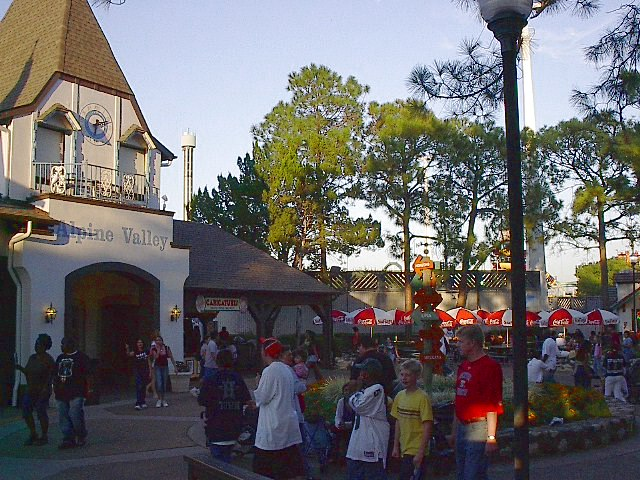
Alpine Valley

There were ten themed areas by the early 1980s. WaterWorld, an adjacent water park built in 1983, became part of AstroWorld in 2002. The park's outdoor concert venue, the Southern Star Amphitheatre, opened in 1980. Well-known musicians and bands performed at the amphitheater over the years, including The Beach Boys, the Grateful Dead, and Bob Dylan.

At the time the park closed, the themed areas were:

- WaterWorld
- Oriental Village (originally Oriental Corner)
- Mexicana (originally Plaza de Fiesta; included Children's World, which was removed to install XLR-8 in 1984)
- Nottingham Village (1972 expansion initially named Country Fair; renamed in 1981)
- Western Junction
- Americana Square
- European Village (originally included Alpine Valley)
- USA (originally Mod Ville; Coney Island expansion (featuring Texas Cyclone) added in 1976; later renamed International Plaza in 1977)

=== Ride history ===
The Alpine Sleigh Ride, Astrowheel, and Mill Pond were among the park's original sixteen rides. The Alpine Sleigh Ride "[took] passengers in roller coasters fashion over a mountain and through snow storms and waterfalls". Its opening was delayed by three weeks after the park's opening day. The water skimmer ride Mill Pond was not operational on opening day for mechanical reasons as well as the late arrival of two "water bug" cars. The Black Dragon debuted within the first year.

To compensate for the humidity in Houston, the park included more than 2,400 tons of cooling with vents in the shaded areas of the park, which AstroWorld called "the largest outdoor air conditioning system in the world" at its opening. Additional air conditioning systems were fitted to the Alpine Sleighs, blowing gusts of refrigerated air over guests at 10 °F (−12 °C).

The "610 Limited" was the park's perimeter railroad, originally operating two steam locomotives, each 5/8-scale 4-4-0, which were built by Guiberson-Harpur Corp., a company owned by famed live steam builder and Walt Disney imagineer Bob Harpur. Each original train had an engine, tender, and four cars for a capacity of 250 passengers, carrying them at speeds up to 10 mph (16 km/h) over 5,002 ft (1,525 m) of track. The No. 2 train was sold for scrap to Gary Norton in 1986 and served at Silverwood Theme Park briefly before the engine was sold to private owners and restored in Georgetown, California; the coaches remain in service at Silverwood. No. 1 remained in limited operation after diesel locomotives were relocated from Six Flags Magic Mountain; after AstroWorld closed, No. 1 was sold in January 2006, restored, and returned to service on the Pacific Coast Railroad at Santa Margarita Ranch in April as Caroline. In addition, Harper Goff designed a custom railcar for Judge Hofheinz, named the Astrodoma, designed to run on the same tracks; it was stored alongside its locomotive in 1976 after the park was sold to Six Flags, and remained undisturbed before it was sold in 2018.

Original rides and attractions (1968)
Name	Closed	Manufacturer	Type	Location	Notes	Ref(s)
"610 Limited" Train	2005	Guiberson-Harpur Corp.	3 ft (0.91 m) narrow gauge miniature railroad	Western Junction, Oriental Corner	Two-station perimeter railroad; 10-minute ride on a 1 mi (1.6 km) track. Open for the park's final season in 2005.	
Alpine Sleighs	1983	Arrow Development	Aero Glide / Dark ride	Alpine Valley	Guests ride sleighs down the 65 ft (20 m) tall "Der Hofheinzberg" over a 1,250 ft (380 m) track and encounter the Abominable Snowman; 16 sleighs with four passengers each. Replaced with Enchanted Kingdom in 1984. The artificial mountain later was repurposed as the Batcave for Batman: The Escape in 1993.	
Astro Go-Go	Unknown	—N/a	Live performance venue	Mod Ville	Renamed from original as Music Pavilion for the 1969 season and 300 seats added.	
Astroway	2005	Von Roll	Gondola lift	Alpine Valley, Oriental Corner	Initially announced as Skyway. Two-station gondola lift; stations were 1,080 ft (330 m) apart. 34 cars.	
Astrowheel	1979	Astron International Group	Double Ferris wheel	Mod Ville	First of its kind, with two arms allowing one side to be loaded at a time. Each arm had eight spokes; each spoke carried an eight-passenger cabin. Closed in 1979 and replaced by Warp 10 in 1981.	
Astroneedle	1999	Willy Bühler Space Towers Company	Gyro tower	(Skyrama Plaza) European Village	340 ft (100 m) tall observation tower, which opened as Skyrama and was renamed Astroneedle. Featured a double-decker cabin with 32 passengers each level — original cabin supplied by Von Roll; retrofitted with Intamin cabin in 1979. Dismantled in February 2000, with the intent to ship it to Six Flags Mexico.	
Barnyard	1984	—N/a	Petting zoo	Children's World	Removed to make room for XLR-8.	
The Black Dragon	1977	Eyerly	Monster	Oriental Corner	Six arms, 48 passenger capacity. Relocated to Coney Island and renamed Razz Ma Tazz in 1976.	
Boot Slide	1984		Slide	Children's World	Enclosed slide 10 ft (3.0 m) high and 22 ft (6.7 m) long in a giant boot; Featured in a modeling shoot for Life magazine, 1969. Removed to make room for XLR-8.	
Crystal Palace	Unknown	—N/a	Live performance venue	Western Junction	800-seat theater, 10 live shows per day until 1982, when performers were replaced by animatronic livestock for The Great Texas Longhorn Revue and the venue was renamed the Cow Palace.	
The Happening	2005	Eli Bridge	Scrambler	Mod Ville	Initially announced as Scrambler. Enclosed in a dome for the 1971 season and renamed Orbiter in 1972. Later relocated to Oriental Corner and renamed Runaway Rickshaws, then moved to Nottingham Village in 1989 and renamed JoustaBout; returned to Oriental Village by the park's final season. After the park's closure, transferred to Six Flags Over Texas as Sidewinder.	
Le Taxi	1983	Arrow Development	Driving simulator	European Village	Similar to Spin Out, but featuring "vintage" French taxis; also designed by Duell. 35 vehicles, track was 2,901 ft (884 m) long. Initially announced as French Taxi. Replaced with Enchanted Kingdom in 1984. Taxi vehicles were moved to Spin Out and that ride was renamed Antique Taxis.	
Lost World Adventure	1988		River boat	Lost World	Set on the "Rio Mysterio"; tells the story of Prof. A. Tiddle Gooley in nine scenes, culminating in an ancient temple ruin. Rethemed as River of No Return in 1976, then The Wetlands in 1985. Replaced by Tidal Wave in 1988.	
Maypole	1977	Arrow Development	Teacup ride	Children's World	Replaced by Aquarena Theatre.	
Mill Pond	1975	Arrow Development	Aquatic bumper car	European Village	Initially announced as Water Bug. 40 boats, two passengers each; half were deployed on the course while the other half loaded visitors. Replaced by Gunslinger, a yo-yo ride.	
Rub-A-Dub	1976	Arrow Development	Channel boat ride	Children's World	Initially announced as Storybook. Floating tubs in a 400 ft (120 m) long trough themed as a storybook. Ride removed and the area was used for the Season Pass processing booth, added in 1979.	
Shooting Gallery	Unknown	—N/a	Shooting gallery	Western Junction	Electronic shooting gallery, first of its kind. Originally branded as "Shoot 'em Up" and "Fast Draw Saloon".	
Spin Out	2005	Arrow Development	Driving simulator	Mod Ville	Similar to Le Taxi, but featuring sports cars; designed by Randall Duell & Associates. 46 cars on a 1,458 ft (444 m) track. Later renamed Antique Taxis. Open for the park's final season in 2005.	
Wagon Wheel	2005	Chance Rides	Trabant	Western Junction	Shaped like a wheel from a Conestoga wagon. 20 seats with two passengers each. Open for the park's final season in 2005.	

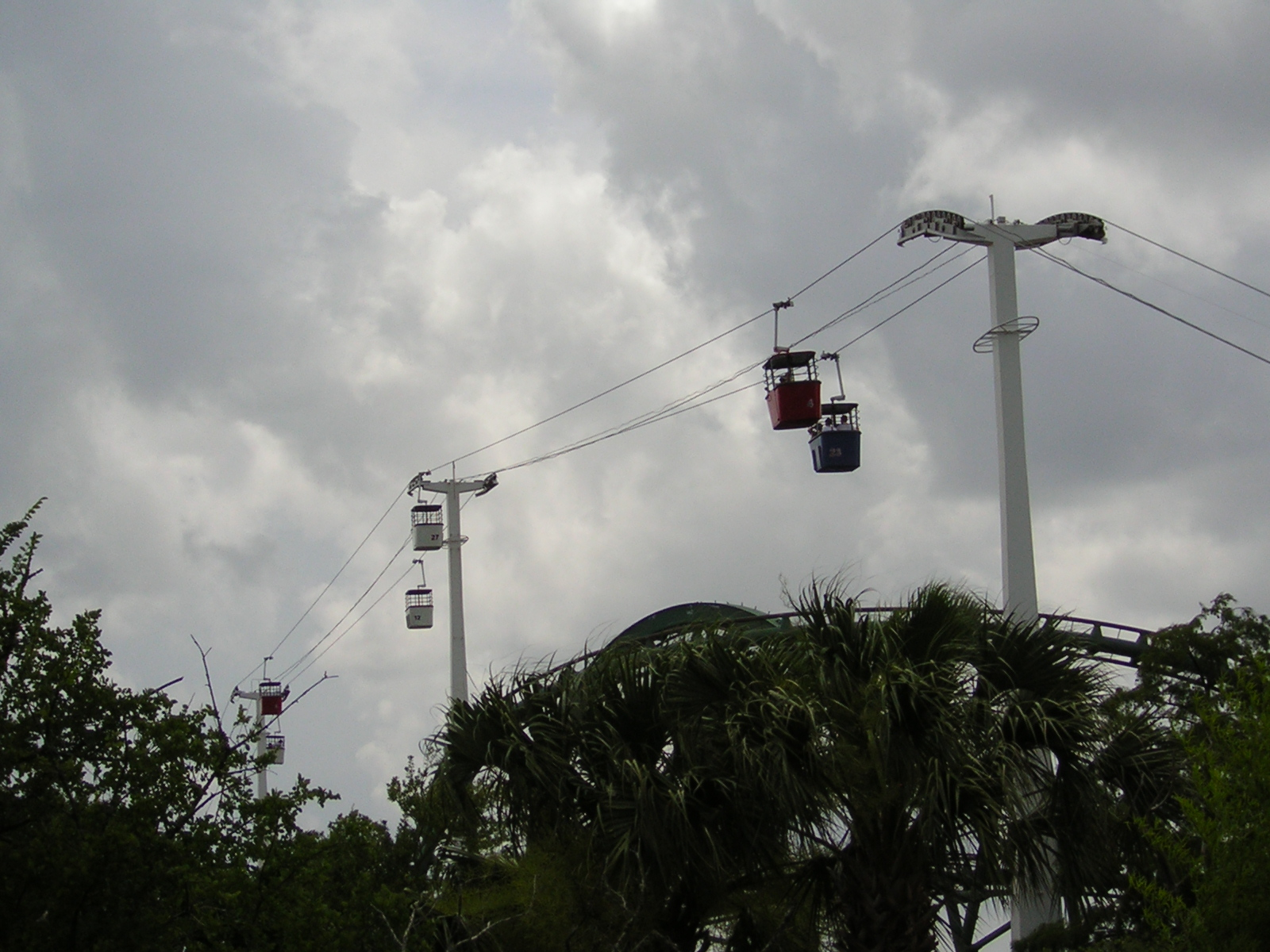
Astroway, a Von Roll skyride (2004)

Bamboo Shoot (a log flume later named Ozarka Splash) and the Serpent junior coaster were installed in 1969. Bamboo Shoot took riders on a 1,500 ft (460 m) course at speeds up to 30 mph (48 km/h); each of the 25 boats carried four adults or six children. Serpent carried 24 passengers on a 722 ft (220 m) track in six cars. The Alpine Carousel (also known as the Dentzel Carousel, after its manufacturer) in Alpine Village also was added for the 1969 season. It was originally built in 1895 and operated from 1907 to 1967 in Forest Park (formerly Eichelberger Park) in Hanover, Pennsylvania. After Forest Park was sold to make way for a shopping center, AstroWorld purchased the carousel and moved it to Houston. It retained its original pipe organ and drums, and the menagerie of animals included lions, ostriches, pigs, camels, horses, rabbits, giraffes, and tigers. Some animals on the outside ring were swapped from a D. C. Muller and Bros. carousel that had previously operated at Pen Mar Park between 1907 and 1943; August Karst operated both the Pen Mar and Forest parks. The Brass Ring Carousel Company of Sun Valley, California, purchased the carousel before the 2006 auction of AstroWorld assets, and restored it for a private museum.

The Swamp Buggy (a dark ride with a 55 ft (17 m) drop over a spiral track "wrapped around a huge tree"), Magnetic House (a fun house) and a wooden bridge were added for the 1970 season to an island (themed "Fun Island") in the lagoon between the Astroneedle and Plaza de Fiesta. The first major park expansion opened in 1972 with a new area themed Country Fair between Americana Square and Oriental Corner. Country Fair included typical midway attractions and the first major roller coaster in the park, the Dexter Frebish Electric Roller Ride (renamed "Excalibur" in 1981 with the retheming of the expansion to Nottingham Village). The park added a second antique carousel at this time in Country Fair, originally built in 1907 by Borelli. Installed in 1976 as part of the 7-acre (2.8 ha) "Coney Island" expansion, Texas Cyclone was among the largest wooden roller coasters in the U.S. and featured a 92 ft (28 m) drop at 53 degrees, achieving a speed of 65 mph (105 km/h). During construction, a tropical storm damaged a portion of the ride, delaying its opening. After the park closed, the coaster's trains were relocated to La Ronde. Greezed Lightnin', installed in 1978, could accelerate from 0 to 60 miles per hour (97 km/h) in four seconds. Joe Bob Briggs (writing under his given name, John Bloom) covered the looping coaster in Texas Monthly that year, noting the ride only lasts 28 seconds, adding the second half of the ride is carried out in reverse: "If there is anything more frightening than entering a 360-degree loop in a coaster car, it is entering a 360-degree loop backwards in a coaster car".

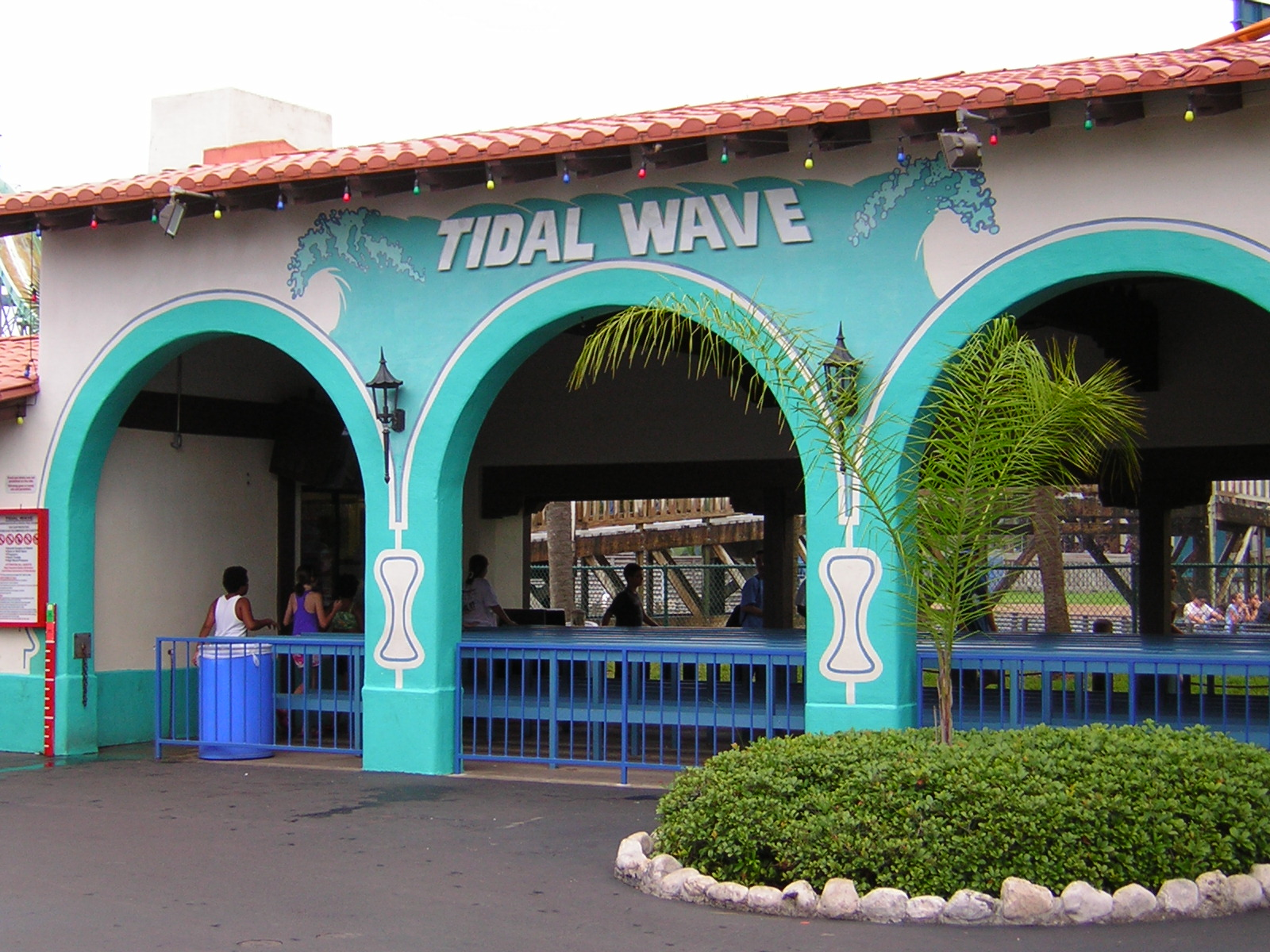
Entrance to Tidal Wave, 2004

Thunder River, installed in 1980, has been described as the "first commercially successful river-rapids ride". Warp 10 took over the former site of the Astrowheel in 1981; it was later moved to Plaza de Fiesta in 1987 and renamed Warp 2000. Warp 2000 was operating as Crazy Legs at Six Flags Over Texas in Arlington, as of 2016. The ten-story Sky Screamer debuted in 1983. Louis B. Parks of the Houston Chronicle said of the ride at the time: "After being shot to the top of the tower in a super fast elevator ride, you are now about to free fall back to the bottom. As you reach the base of the tower, several weeks ahead of your stomach, you will be swooshed along a curving track, changing your horizon and your bearings, and braked to a quick stop while lying on your back." In 2013, the newspaper's J. R. Gonzalez recalled, this "crash course in physics ... wasn't as scary as the Texas Cyclone, nor as drenching as Thunder River, but it did make for a quick thrill". AstroWorld removed the ride during the 1990s. XLR-8 was installed in 1984. Looping Starship was installed in 1986. Arrow-Huss originally manufactured Tidal Wave as "Shoot the Chute" for the 1984 World's Fair in New Orleans. Six Flags purchased the ride after the fair's bankruptcy and installed it at AstroWorld in 1988, replacing the Lost World riverboat ride. It was described as "a flume designed to plunge passengers down a series of slides in a small boat" and "dependent upon a stream of pumped water".

Ultra Twister was installed in 1990. The ride stood nine stories tall and had a vertical drop followed by a series of barrel rolls. Mayan Mindbender was installed originally as Nightmare at Boblo Island in 1995, becoming the park's first indoor roller coaster. The 1,148-foot (350 m) coaster was housed inside a Mayan pyramid. The ride's trains had twelve cars made by the Dutch company Vekoma, with T-bars used as restraints. In 2004, Josh Harkinson of the Houston Press wrote, "the coaster resembles Indiana Jones skiing Space Mountain: It caroms in total darkness inside a faux Mayan temple. Teens are delightfully horrified." In 2019, the newspaper's Jef Rouner opined, "The line setting was fantastic, too. It wound through a jungle past skeletons in crashed jeeps and was probably the best themed wait outside of Batman: The Escape." The ride later operated as The Hornet at Amarillo's Wonderland Park. In 1997, AstroWorld added Dungeon Drop, an Intamin drop tower, to Nottingham Village; that ride let passengers fall, reaching approximately 60 mph (97 km/h) in three seconds, before slowing the descent via large magnets. The ride's entry was based on a medieval torture chamber. It was repainted and operated as Superman: Tower of Power at Six Flags St. Louis. It closed at the end of the 2020 season and was demolished during the 2021 season. Serial Thriller originally operated at AstroWorld starting in 1999. The ride was placed into storage in 2005 and began operating as Ednör at La Ronde in 2010.

SWAT opened in 2003 in Plaza de Fiesta, along with Diablo Falls, a spinning rapids ride; after the closure of AstroWorld, both rides were relocated to Six Flags New England as Catapult and Splash Water Falls, respectively. S&S Worldwide manufactured SWAT, and only two rides of this type were built; the other was installed at Thorpe Park in England.

=== List of roller coasters ===
Name	Image	Opened	Closed	Manufacturer	Type	Location	Notes
Batman The Escape	Batman the Escape	1993	2005	Intamin	Stand-up roller coaster	European Village	The Batman-themed roller coaster was being stored at Six Flags Darien Lake in Darien, New York, as of 2016, and was eventually scrapped.
Excalibur	—	1972	1998	Arrow Development	Mine train roller coaster	Nottingham Village	Formerly known as Dexter Frebish's Electric Roller Ride, the roller coaster was stored at Frontier City in Oklahoma City, and was eventually scrapped.
Greezed Lightnin'	Greezed Lightnin'	1978	2005	Schwarzkopf	Shuttle Loop	Western Junction	The roller coaster was relocated to Joyland Amusement Park in Lubbock, Texas, and remains in storage in nearby Mackenzie Park. Ownership was transferred to Cliff's Amusement Park in Albuquerque.
Mayan Mindbender	Mayan Mindbender	1995	2005	Vekoma	Custom MK-700	Oriental Corner	The roller coaster was relocated to Wonderland Park in Amarillo, Texas, as Hornet.
Serial Thriller	Serial Thriller	1999	2005	Vekoma	Suspended Looping Coaster (689m)	Nottingham Village	The roller coaster was relocated to Montreal's La Ronde amusement park as Ednör – L'Attaque.
Serpent	Serpent	1969	2005	Arrow Development	Mini-mine train roller coaster	Oriental Corner	Serpent was the park's first roller coaster and the last junior mine train made by Arrow Development. It was demolished following the park's permanent closure.
Swamp Buggy Ride	Serpent	1970	c. 1972	Chance Rides	Toboggan	Fun Island	The ride carried guests "55 feet up above the center of a giant swamp tree and then slide dizzily down a spiraled track wrapped around a huge tree".
Texas Cyclone	Texas Cyclone	1976	2005	William Cobb	Wooden roller coaster	USA	Modeled after the Coney Island Cyclone, the coaster was demolished, with trains relocated to Montreal's La Ronde amusement park.
Texas Tornado	Texas Tornado	1998	2002	Schwarzkopf	Sit down roller coaster	Plaza de Fiesta	The roller coaster did not operate during 2001–2002, and was later relocated to Six Flags Discovery Kingdom in Vallejo, California, as Zonga.
Ultra Twister	Ultra Twister	1990	2005	TOGO	Pipeline roller coaster	European Village	The roller coaster was relocated to Six Flags America in Woodmore, Maryland, and eventually scrapped.
Viper	Viper	1989	2005	Schwarzkopf	Looping Star	Oriental Corner	The roller coaster operated as Jet Scream at Six Flags Over Mid-America in Eureka, Missouri, from 1981 to 1988.
XLR-8	XLR-8	1984	2005	Arrow Dynamics	Suspended roller coaster	Plaza de Fiesta	The roller coaster was demolished, with trains relocated to Six Flags Magic Mountain in Santa Clarita, California.

== WaterWorld ==
WaterWorld, Houston's first water park, opened in June 1983. Although it shared an entrance with AstroWorld, a separate $8.95 admission charge was required for entry; by comparison, the one-day ticket price for AstroWorld at the time was $12.50.

The 10-acre (4.0 ha) 1.9 million-gallon water park featured a 200 ft-long (61 m) wave pool called Breaker Beach. According to the Houston Chronicle, other attractions included the Lagoon, "a lush swimming area with waterfalls and diving platforms". Water slides included Wipe-Out, Typhoon, Tidal Wave, and Hurricane, which offered twisting and turning rides as long as 400 ft (120 m) while patrons slid back down to earth. Wipe-Out, in particular, had a vertical drop of 60 ft (18 m) over a straight 300 ft (91 m) length and claimed to accelerate riders to 40 mph (64 km/h). "Squirt's Splash was strictly for the kids and parents with water pistols and mazes. Runaway River was an attraction that saw riders float through a series of pools and thrilling drops that eventually lead back to the Lagoon." Two rides were added to the park in 1999, including Big Kahuna.

Peak attendance reached approximately 20,000 people on Saturdays. AstroWorld and WaterWorld merged in 2002.

== Events ==
The park's Southern Star Amphitheater opened in 1980 and hosted a variety of performers, including The Beach Boys, The Cure, Destiny's Child, Bob Dylan, the Grateful Dead, Heart (1985), Billy Idol, The Monkees, and Selena. The music video for the Debbie Gibson song "Staying Together" was filmed at the concert venue in 1987. The venue hosted music festivals such as Joyfest, featuring Christian groups Jars of Clay and Point of Grace (1990s).

Six Flags AstroWorld originated the "Fright Nights" special event for the Halloween season in 1986, designed to help drive attendance during the otherwise light fall season. The event was renamed "Fright Fest" in 1993, and continued until the park closed in 2005. Holiday in the Park was held around Christmas. The park had other seasonal attractions, like Alice Cooper's Brutal Planet. The singer also performed at AstroWorld.

== Personnel ==
Dan Dunn and Jeff Martin worked as a caricaturists at the park. Daniel Johnston operated River of No Return.

In 2018, former employees organized the AstroWorld 50th Anniversary Employee Reunion.

== Media and legacy ==
On December 28, 1968, ABC aired the children's television special The Pied Piper of Astroworld, starring Soupy Sales, Lesley Gore, and Kenny Rogers and The First Edition, featuring Patrick Swayze in a bear costume and The Muppets. Robert Altman directed Bud Cort as a reclusive inventor living in the Astrodome for the cult classic film Brewster McCloud, released in 1970, with scenes from AstroWorld including the Lost World Adventure riverboat ride.

The model of AstroWorld built by Ed Henderson in 1967 was displayed publicly again at the Houston Public Library Central Library's Julia Ideson Building starting in 2011. In 2016, the library announced the model would be exhibited there permanently.

In 2015, the bar Moving Sidewalk launched an AstroWorld-themed cocktail menu.

American rapper and singer Travis Scott, born and raised in Houston, called his third studio album Astroworld (2018) to commemorate his hometown. In an XXL interview, he said of the park's closure and demolition, "They took AstroWorld away from us in Houston." Scott announced a festival taking Astroworld's name for 2018. Scott mentioned one of the motivations of the festival was to "bring back the beloved spirit and nostalgia of AstroWorld, making a childhood dream of Travis' come true".

In 2019, Craig Hlavaty of the Houston Chronicle called the Astroneedle a Houston landmark.

== See also ==
- History of Houston
- List of defunct amusement parks
- Six Flags Hurricane Harbor SplashTown
