= Serpent (roller coaster) =

Defunct roller coaster

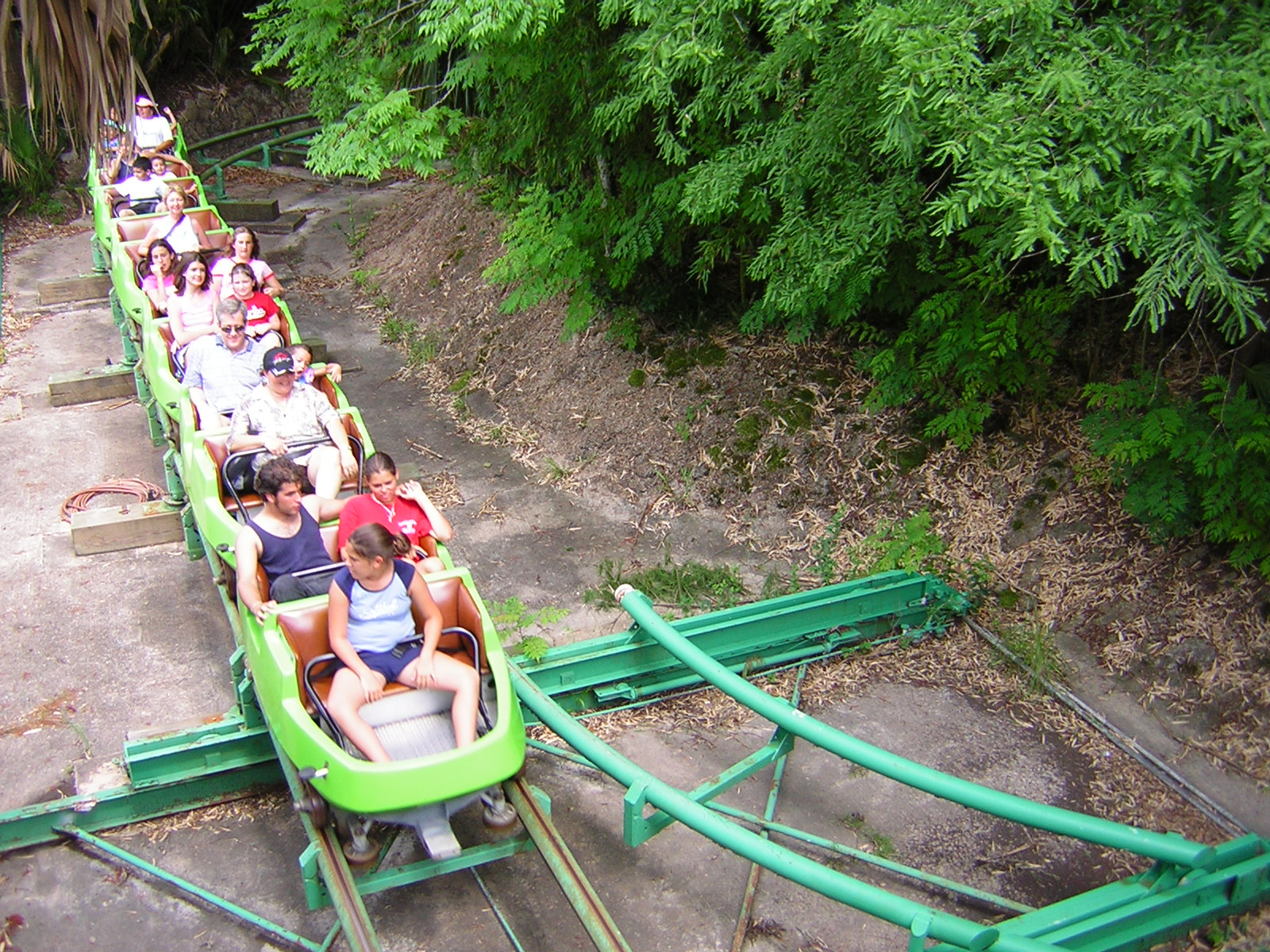
- Serpent in 2004

Six Flags AstroWorld
- Location: Six Flags AstroWorld
- Coordinates: 29.676°N 95.407°W
- Status: Removed
- Opening date: 1969
- Closing date: October 30, 2005

General statistics
- Type: Steel
- Manufacturer: Arrow Dynamics
- Model: Mine Train
- Lift/launch system: Chain lift hill
- Height: 20 ft (6.1 m)
- Length: 810 ft (250 m)
- Speed: 14 mph (23 km/h)
- Inversions: 0
- Duration: 1:29
- Capacity: 500 riders per hour
- Height restriction: 36 in (91 cm)
- Serpent at RCDB

Serpent was a steel roller coaster at Six Flags AstroWorld. It was built by Arrow Dynamics in 1969, which made it the park's first roller coaster and the last junior mine train made by Arrow Dynamics. After AstroWorld closed at the end of the 2005 operating season on October 30, 2005, the ride was demolished.

== Reception ==
Cory Garcia of the Houston Press described the coaster as "chill" and "so laid-back, even those of us most afraid of rides could probably handle it with grace, or at least only a few screams".

== See also ==
- List of Arrow Dynamics rides
