= Batman The Escape =

Defunct roller coaster

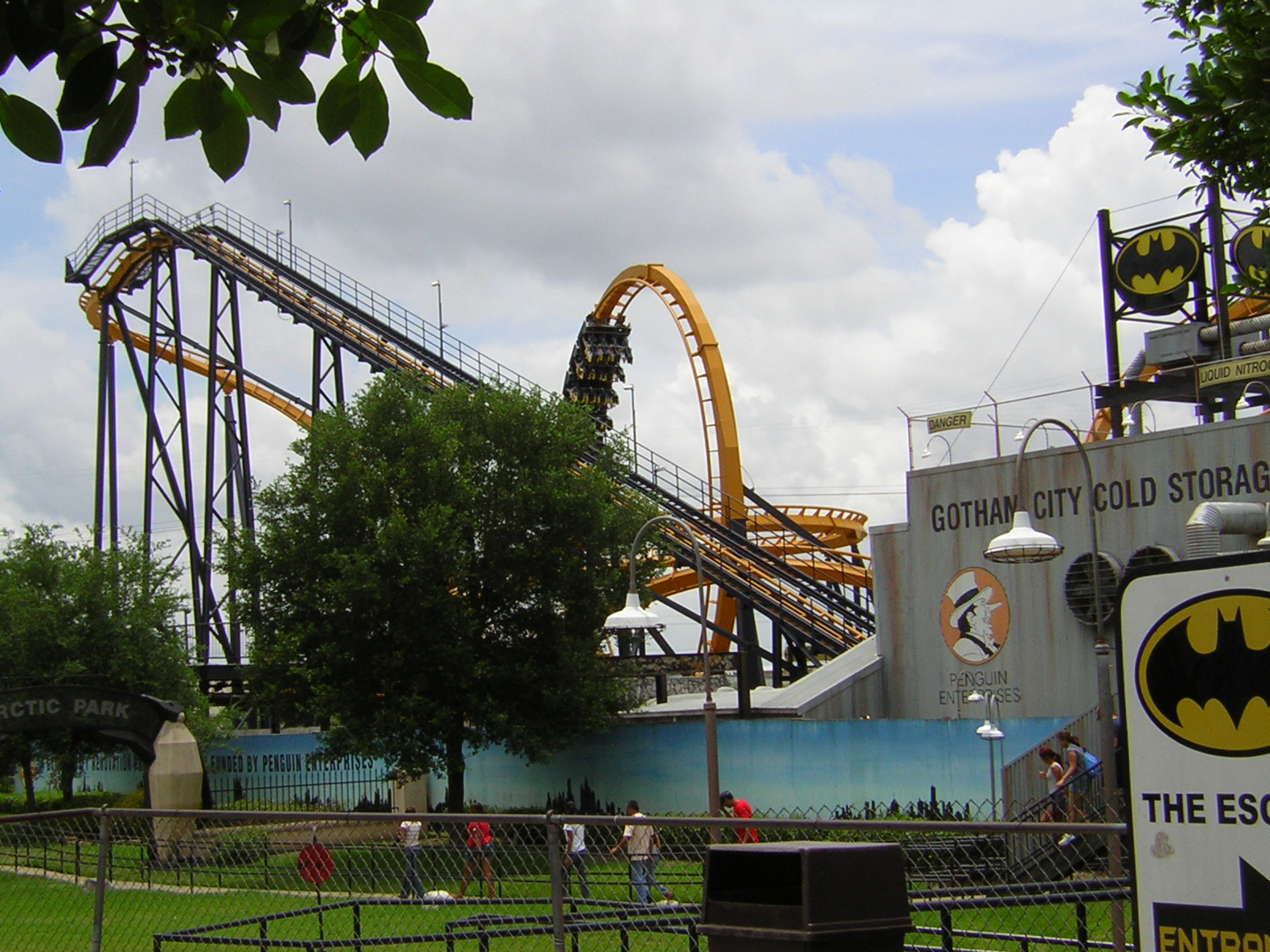
- Batman The Escape in 2004 at Six Flags Astroworld.

Six Flags AstroWorld
- Coordinates: 29.673375°N 95.409454°W
- Status: Removed
- Opening date: April 24, 1993
- Closing date: October 30, 2005
- Batman The Escape at Six Flags AstroWorld at RCDB

Six Flags Great Adventure
- Name: Shockwave
- Coordinates: 40.138°N 74.438°W
- Status: Removed
- Opening date: April 21, 1990
- Closing date: September 1992
- Replaced by: Houdini's Great Escape Slingshot
- Shockwave at Six Flags Great Adventure at RCDB

Six Flags Magic Mountain
- Name: Shockwave
- Coordinates: 34.421056°N 118.600196°W
- Status: Removed
- Opening date: May 16, 1986
- Closing date: 1988
- Replaced: Sarajevo Bobsleds
- Replaced by: Psyclone
- Shockwave at Six Flags Magic Mountain at RCDB

General statistics
- Type: Steel – Stand-up
- Manufacturer: Intamin
- Height: 90 ft (27 m)
- Drop: 85 ft (26 m)
- Length: 2,300 ft (700 m)
- Speed: 55 mph (89 km/h)
- Inversions: 1
- Duration: 2:18
- G-force: 3.4
- Height restriction: 54 in (137 cm)
- Trains: 2 trains with 5 cars; riders arranged 4 across in a single row for a total of 20 riders per train

Batman The Escape was a stand-up roller coaster located at Six Flags AstroWorld in Houston, Texas, United States. Manufactured by Intamin, the ride featured one inversion and originally opened as Shockwave at Six Flags Magic Mountain in 1986. After briefly operating at Six Flags Great Adventure, it was moved a second time to AstroWorld, where it reopened in 1993 as Batman The Escape. The coaster operated there until the park's permanent closure in 2005. The track was eventually moved to Six Flags Darien Lake, placed into storage, and never reassembled.

== History ==
=== Six Flags Magic Mountain ===
The ride was originally known as Shockwave at Six Flags Magic Mountain. It was a prototype stand-up coaster that was purchased from the Intamin testing facility in Switzerland. Over fifty trucks delivered the 771,618 lb (350,000 kg) ride to Los Angeles in 40-foot (12 m) long containers. Shockwave officially opened to the public on May 16, 1986. The coaster was a very popular attraction at Magic Mountain regardless of its roughness due to the positions of the restraints. At the time, Six Flags had a ride rotation program, in which some coasters would remain at a park for a couple years and then transferred to another park.

=== Six Flags Great Adventure ===
Shockwave closed in 1988 and was relocated to Six Flags Great Adventure, where it reopened in 1990. Its former location at Magic Mountain would be repurposed for the wooden twister roller coaster, Psyclone, which opened in 1991. Shockwave operated at Great Adventure through 1992. It was dismantled in the offseason and relocated to Six Flags AstroWorld.

=== AstroWorld ===
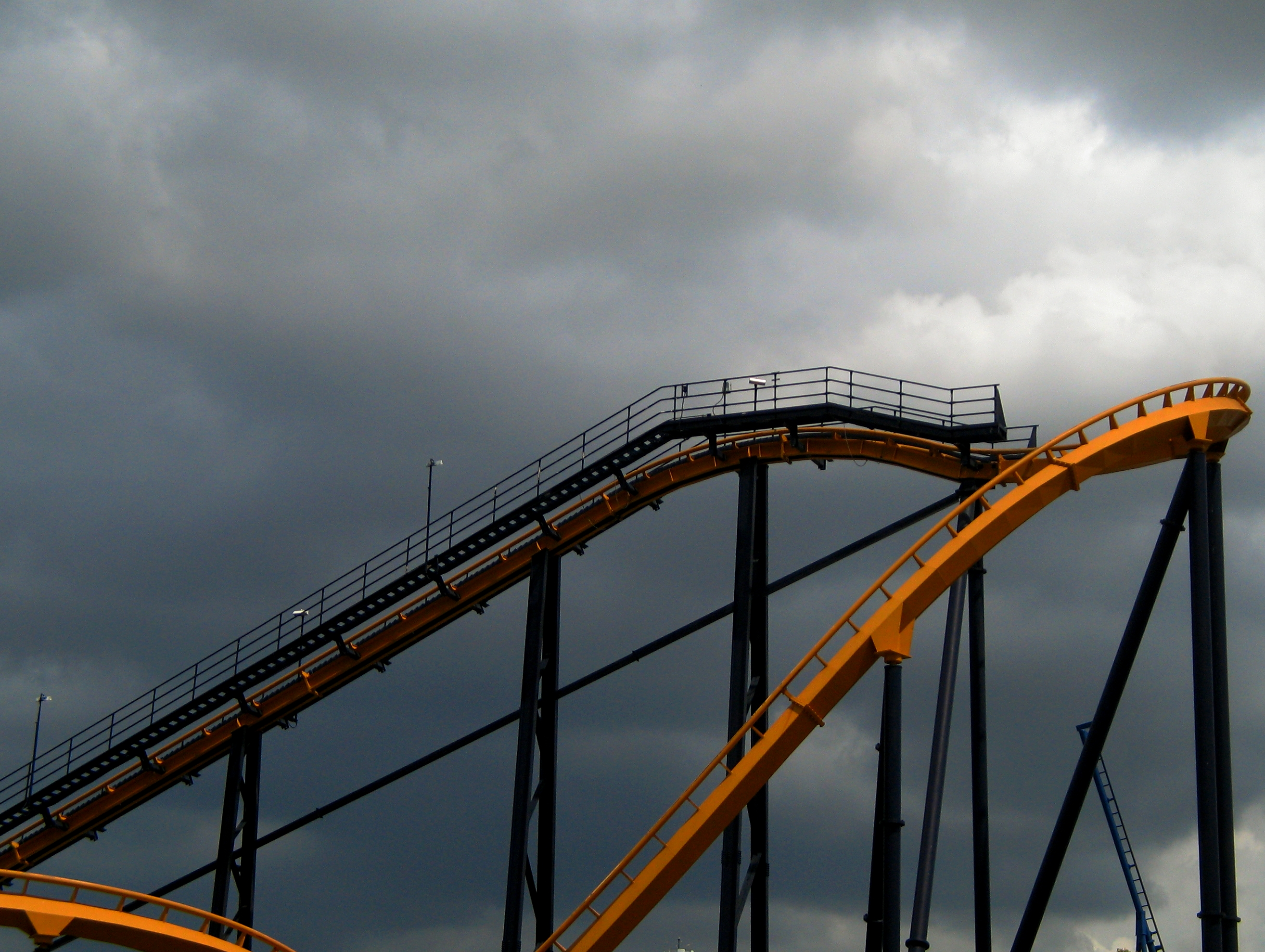
Batman The Escape, 2005

In December 1992, AstroWorld announced that they would be receiving Batman The Escape for the park's 25th anniversary. The ride was given a new color scheme and featured over 100 special effects. It reopened on April 24, 1993. A Batcave adjacent to the coaster was created out of an artificial mountain for a previous attraction and heavily themed as guests would prepare to ride the coaster – its theme would later be removed in 1998.

On September 12, 2005, Six Flags CEO, Kieran Burke, announced that AstroWorld would be closed permanently at the end of the 2005 season on October 30 and be later demolished. The company cited issues such as the park's performance, and parking challenges involving the Houston Texans football team, Reliant Stadium, and the Houston Livestock Show and Rodeo leveraged with the estimated value of the property upon which the park was located. Company executives were expecting to receive upwards of $150 million for the real estate, but ended up receiving less than half of that amount. After spending $20 million to demolish the park and clear the land, Six Flags received $77 million when the bare property was sold to a development corporation in 2006 (reported in a corporate earnings report). This transaction contributed to the decision by shareholders of the company to remove CEO, Kieran Burke, from his position on the board. He was replaced by Mark Shapiro formerly of Disney and ESPN.

=== Six Flags Darien Lake ===
After being dismantled, Six Flags placed the track in storage at Six Flags Darien Lake. It remained in storage through the sale of the park to PARC Management and CNL Income Properties. No mechanical parts, including engine components, were salvaged, and as of 2018 there are no plans to install the ride at Darien Lake.

== Facts ==
- The ride featured a 66-foot-tall (20 m) vertical loop.
- The ride was painted blue and black when it opened. It was painted white in 1994 but was re-painted yellow and black in 2004.
