= Ultra Twister (Six Flags) =

Defunct roller coaster

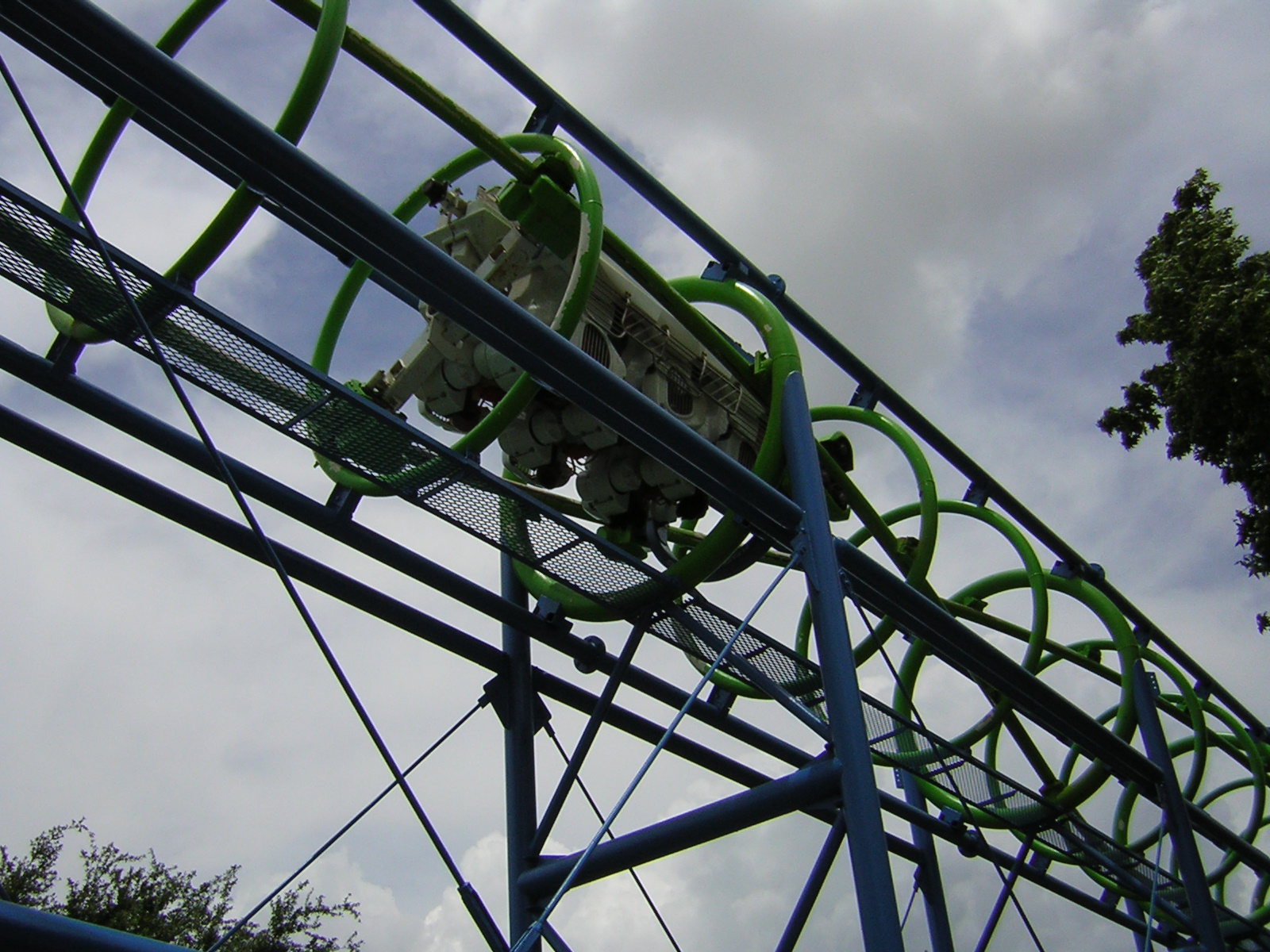
- Ultra Twister at AstroWorld

Six Flags AstroWorld
- Coordinates: 40.1397°N 74.4376°W
- Status: Removed
- Opening date: 1990
- Closing date: October 30, 2005

Six Flags Great Adventure
- Park section: Frontier Adventures
- Coordinates: 40.1386°N 74.4344°W
- Status: Removed
- Opening date: June 6, 1986
- Closing date: 1988
- Cost: $3,000,000
- Replaced by: Viper
- Ultra Twister at Six Flags Great Adventure at RCDB

General statistics
- Type: Steel – Pipeline
- Manufacturer: TOGO
- Model: Ultratwister
- Lift/launch system: Chain lift hill
- Height: 96.8 ft (29.5 m)
- Drop: 92 ft (28 m)
- Length: 1,421 ft (433 m)
- Speed: 44 mph (71 km/h)
- Inversions: 3
- Duration: 1:40
- Max vertical angle: 85°
- Height restriction: 48 in (122 cm)
- Trains: 7 cars. Riders arranged 2 across in 3 rows for a total of 6 riders per car.
- Ultra Twister at RCDB

Ultra Twister was a steel roller coaster located at Six Flags Great Adventure from 1986 to 1988 and then at Six Flags AstroWorld from 1990 until that park was closed and demolished by Six Flags in 2005. The ultratwister-design is that of a pipeline roller coaster, created by Japanese company TOGO.

== History ==
=== Six Flags Great Adventure (1986-1988) ===
Ultra Twister was previously located at Six Flags Great Adventure under the same name. It was located at Six Flags Great Adventure's "Frontier Adventures" section along a path going from Rolling Thunder down to Runaway Mine Train.

Construction of the ride began in November 1985. On June 6, 1986, Ultra Twister opened to the public. Upon its opening, it was the first heartline roll coaster in the United States, as well as the coaster with the steepest ascent. There was also a "chicken exit" in the queue for guests who refused to ride.

Despite the positive reception and unique ride experience, Ultra Twister was plagued with an assortment of issues during its time at Great Adventure. Reoccurring stress fractures required constant rewelding of the track, which led to frequent downtime. Evacuating passengers from trains that became stuck on the vertical lift hill was a difficult and dangerous task. A small elevator was installed behind it, but it was limited to evacuating one guest at a time. The ride's hourly capacity was also limited, making it unsuitable for long lines.

Ultra Twister was disassembled in 1989 and moved to a smaller Six Flags property, Six Flags AstroWorld, where the small footprint of the ride would be more advantageous. This was also selected in accordance with Six Flags' ride rotation program, which often shuffles rides from park to park as their novelty wears off. A new roller coaster called Great American Scream Machine opened the same year at Great Adventure, and six years later in 1995, Viper was built in Ultra Twister's former location.

=== Six Flags AstroWorld (1990-2005) ===
Ultra Twister reopened under the same name at AstroWorld in 1990. Its lift hill was modified from a 90-degree vertical ascent to an angle of 45 degrees. The coaster was changed from its bluish-white color scheme to green and blue in 2004. The ride continued to operate until AstroWorld closed permanently on October 30, 2005. Subsequently, the coaster was dismantled and brought to Six Flags America in Largo, Maryland, where it was placed in storage until its removal in 2010.
