= El Toro (Six Flags Great Adventure) =

Wooden roller coaster

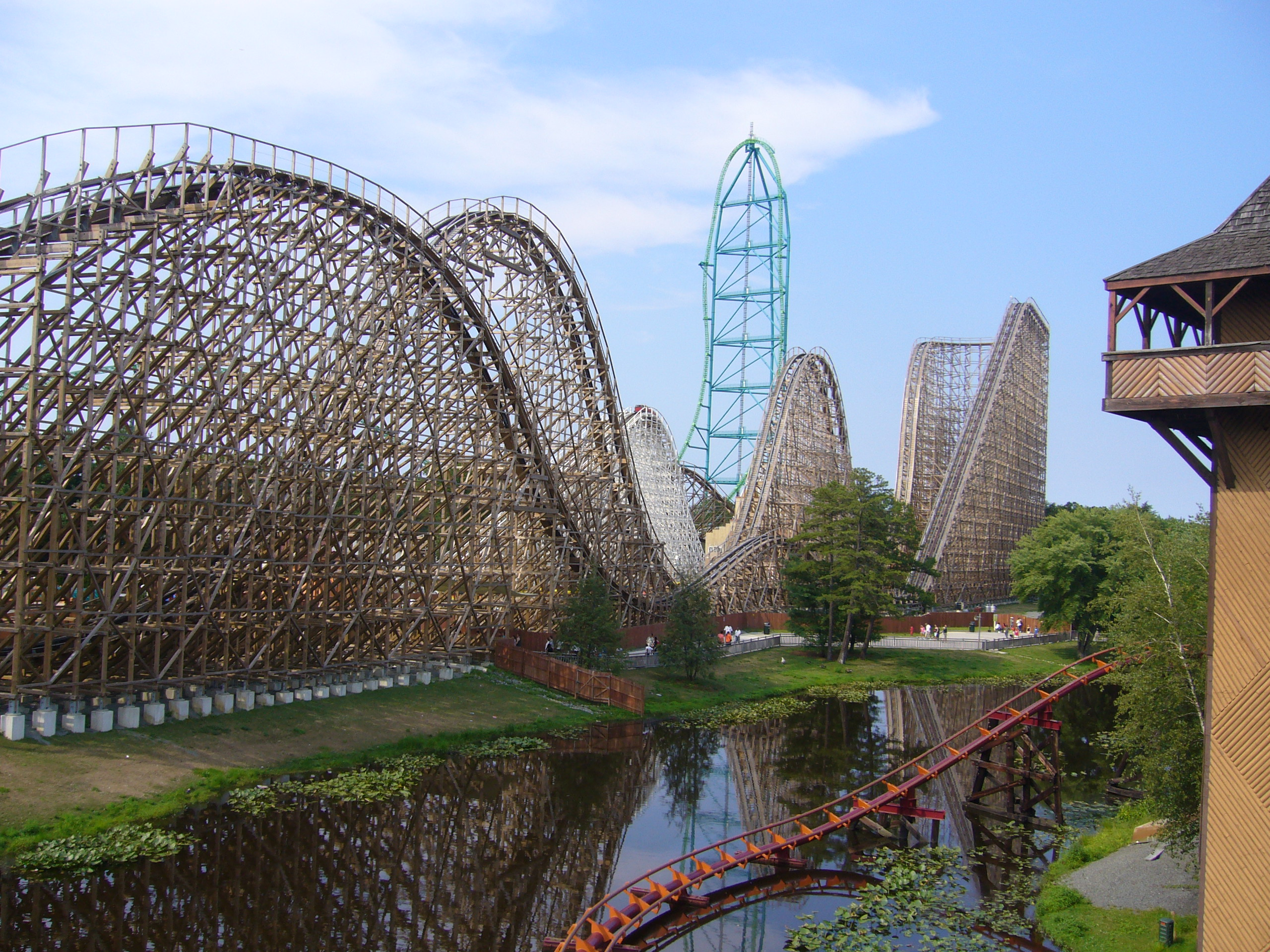
- Out and back layout of El Toro (2007)

Six Flags Great Adventure
- Location: Six Flags Great Adventure
- Park section: Plaza del Carnaval
- Coordinates: 40°8′19.90″N 74°26′4.67″W
- Status: Operating
- Soft opening date: June 11, 2006
- Opening date: June 12, 2006
- Replaced: Viper

General statistics
- Type: Wood
- Manufacturer: Intamin
- Designer: Werner Stengel
- Model: Wooden Coaster (Prefabricated Track)
- Track layout: Out and Back
- Lift/launch system: Cable lift hill
- Height: 181 ft (55 m)
- Drop: 176 ft (54 m)
- Length: 4,400 ft (1,300 m)
- Speed: 70.0 mph (112.7 km/h)
- Inversions: 0
- Duration: 1:42
- Max vertical angle: 76°
- Capacity: 1400 riders per hour
- Height restriction: 48–77 in (122–196 cm)
- Trains: 2 trains with 6 cars; riders arranged 2 across in 3 rows for a total of 36 riders per train
- Fast Lane available
- El Toro at RCDB

El Toro (Spanish for The Bull) is a wooden roller coaster located at Six Flags Great Adventure in Jackson Township, New Jersey, United States. Designed by Werner Stengel and manufactured by Intamin, the ride opened to the public on June 11, 2006. Intamin subcontracted Rocky Mountain Construction to build the ride, and the coaster's track was prefabricated, allowing for quicker installation and lower construction costs. El Toro is the main attraction of the Mexican-themed section of the park, Plaza Del Carnaval. It replaced another roller coaster, Viper, which closed following the 2004 season.

When it opened, El Toro had the steepest drop of any wooden roller coaster in the world at 76 degrees, a record that was later broken by T Express at Everland in 2008. Among wooden coasters, its height of 181 feet (55 m) ranks third, its drop height of 176 feet (54 m) ranks second, and its maximum speed of 70 mph (110 km/h) ranks third. The coaster has been well received, and has consistently ranked in the top three of the annual Golden Ticket Awards publication from Amusement Today.

== History ==
El Toro sits on the former site of Viper, which closed in 2004. All components of Viper were removed in early 2005, except for the station. El Toro was announced on September 28, 2005, along with Bugs Bunny National Park, a new themed area for children. It was also announced El Toro would be part of a new themed area known as Plaza del Carnaval, which would also include the adjacent wooden racing coaster, Rolling Thunder. Al Rubano, the director of Six Flags Great Adventure's construction committee, oversaw the ride's construction. The lift hill was topped out on December 20, 2005, at a height of 188 feet (57 m). The ride started testing on Memorial Day weekend in 2006. The ride had a surprise opening on June 11, then held its grand opening on June 12.

El Toro uses the same station as Viper, the coaster that formerly stood on the site. El Toro also sits partially on land once shared by Great Adventure's first wooden coaster, Rolling Thunder.

== Description ==
El Toro carries a Mexican theme, and its name translates to "The bull" in Spanish. The ride's queue is surrounded by Southwestern-style buildings of Plaza del Carnaval, and it features abandoned "wagon wheels" and Spanish posters along a wall separating the queue from the ride.

=== Ride layout ===
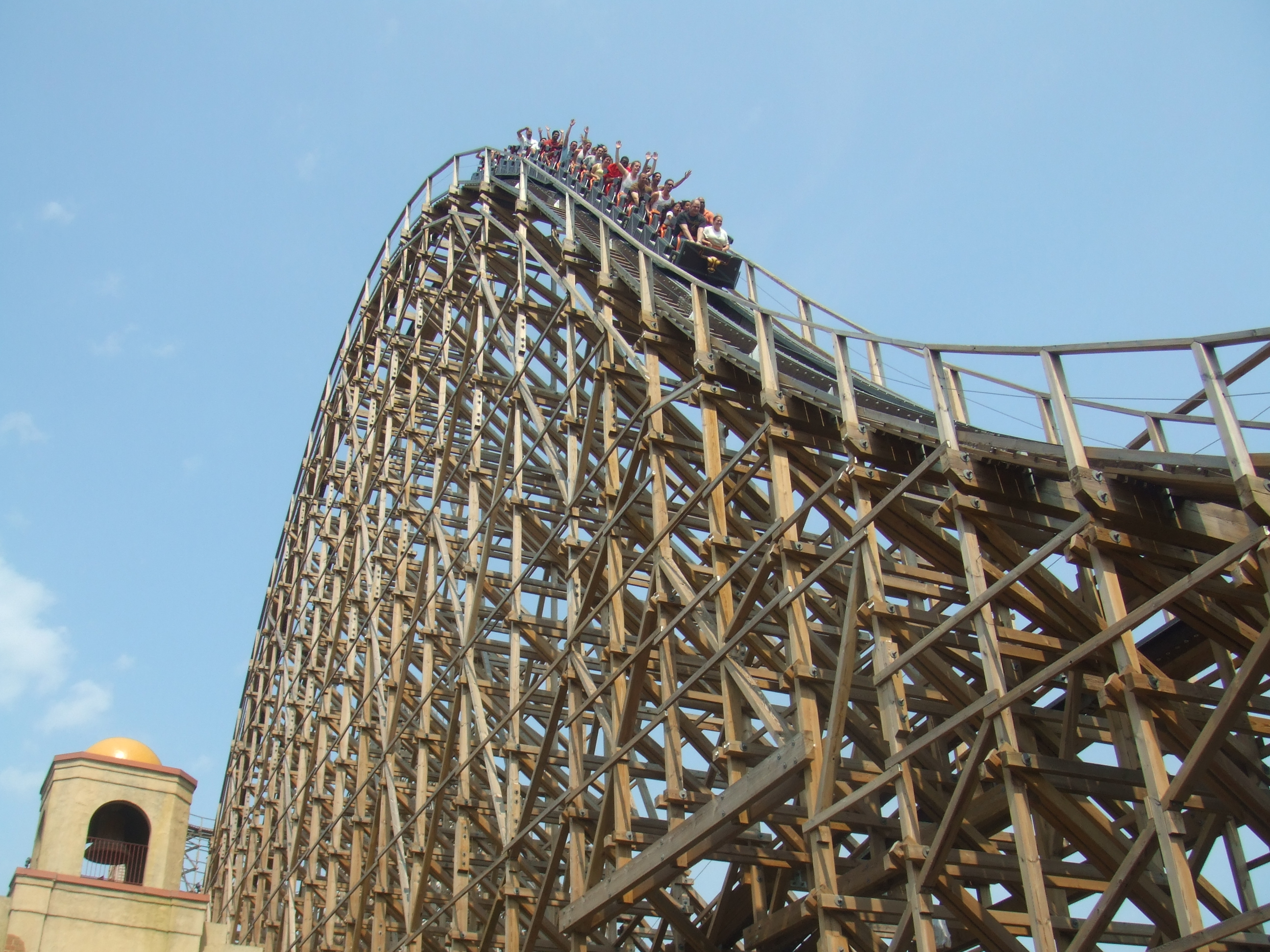
Train A on the second hill

After departing from the station, the train makes a turn to the left, passing through the ride's structure. It then begins to climb the 181-foot (55 m) tall cable lift hill. Once the entire train is on the lift the cable increases its speed to around 13 mph. Once at the top of the lift the speed of the cable gently slows down, but it is barely noticeable on the ride. After cresting the top of the lift, the train briefly travels forward and makes a 180-degree turn to the left. It then drops 176 feet (54 m) at a 76-degree angle, reaching a top speed of 70 miles per hour (110 km/h). As the train reaches the bottom of the drop, it comes close to the track above, creating a headchopper effect. It then travels up a 112-foot (34 m) camelback hill followed by a second camelback hill at 100 feet (30 m). It then rises and then travels through a 180-degree downward-banked turn to the right, and up another banked turn to the left. The train goes through a small second hill that speeds past the station and the lakeside. The train then makes another turn and up a smaller hill where riders experience -2 g forces on an ejector airtime hill, crossing over the former Rolling Thunder track. After coming down the drop, the train snakes through twists and turns. After coming out of the twister section, the train slows down as it moves through small "S" curve camelback hills and into the brake run.

=== Trains ===
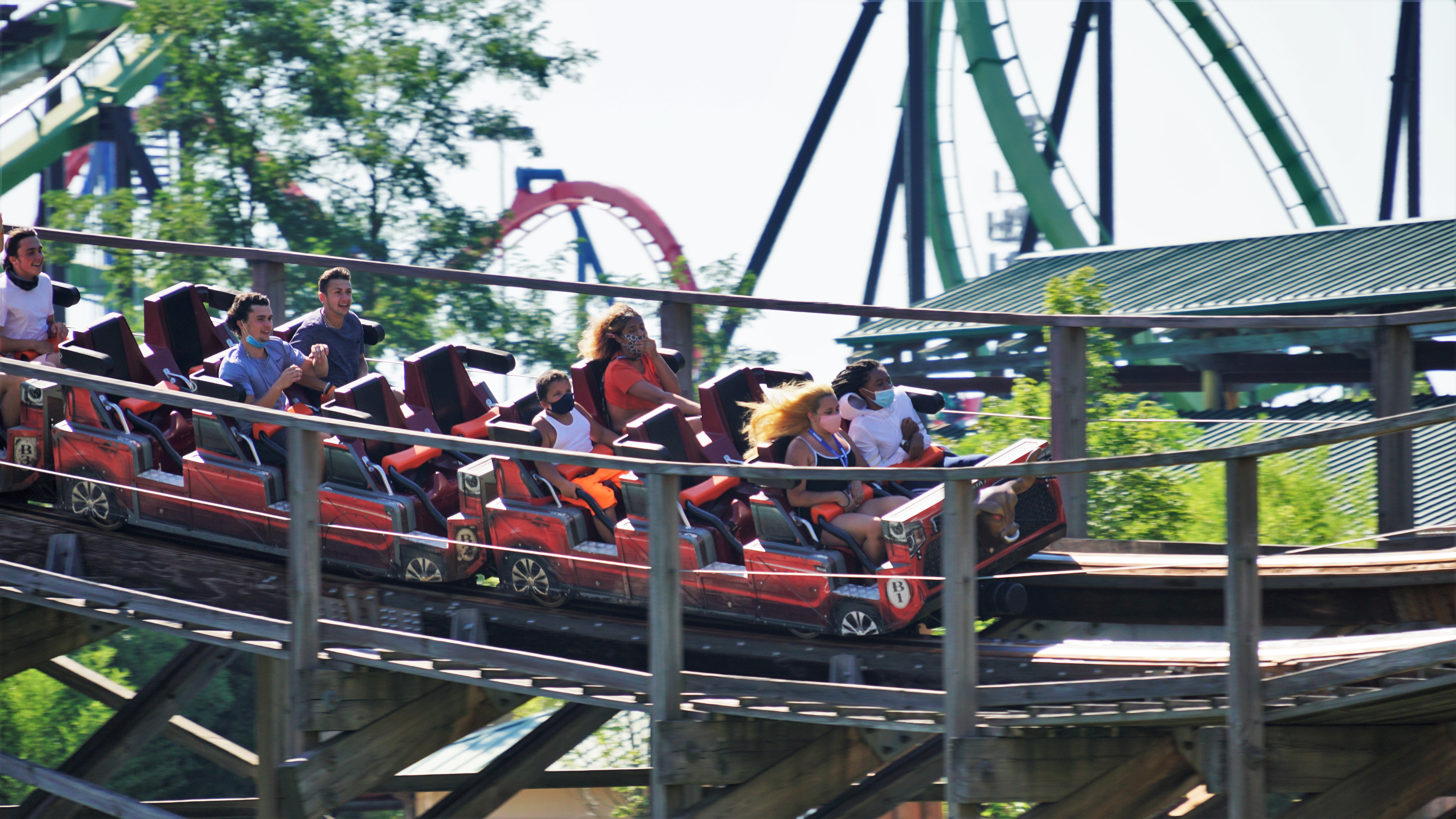
Train B maneuvering through the camelback hill finale

El Toro operates two trains, labeled A and B, each with six cars per train. Riders are arranged two across in three rows for a total of 36 riders per train. It has a theoretical capacity of 1,200 guests per hour. Both trains contain a cosmetic bull head mounted on the front car. The trains have padded "wings" at shoulder level to prevent riders from being injured during moments of strong lateral forces.

=== Track ===
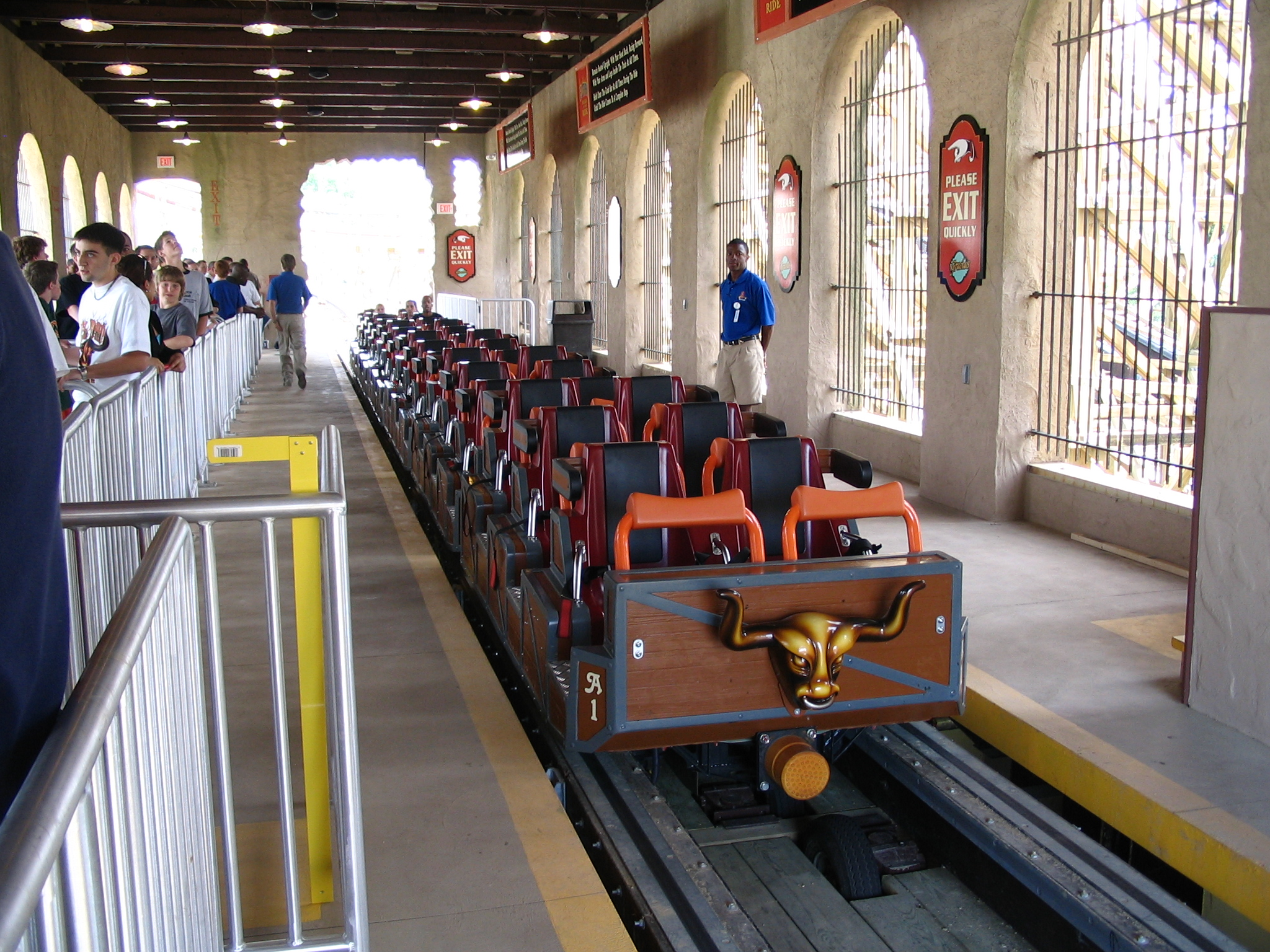
Train A in the station

The wooden track is approximately 4,400 feet (1,300 m) in length, and the height of the lift is approximately 181 feet (55 m). El Toro is very different from a traditional wooden roller coaster because it uses prefabricated wooden track. It was built and designed by Intamin, who also worked with employees of Rocky Mountain Construction to build the ride. Instead of carpenters cutting, shaping, and laying down the track on site by hand, the track is laser cut in a factory. This means that the track is manufactured to a higher degree of precision than could be achieved by hand. The "Plug and Play" aspect of the coaster speeds its construction, since track does not have to be completely manufactured on site. In addition, because of the speed of construction, the costs of building the coaster are lowered due to fewer man-hours spent on its construction. The riders are subject to a coaster whose track is as smooth as steel. El Toro is the first Intamin "Plug and Play" (Pre-Fab) wooden roller coaster in the United States and one of four in the world. The other three are Colossos at Heide Park in Germany, Balder at Liseberg in Sweden, and T Express at Everland in South Korea.

== Records ==
When El Toro debuted, it broke records as the second-tallest and fastest with the second-longest drop of a wooden roller coaster in the United States. As of October 2023, El Toro is the third fastest wooden roller coaster in the world with a maximum speed of 70 mph (110 km/h). It is also the third-tallest with the second-longest drop among wooden coasters.

== Incidents ==
After suffering a malfunctioning lift motor in early August 2013, El Toro was closed for several weeks. The motor was sent to Intamin's American headquarters in Maryland for repairs.

On June 29, 2021, a train partially derailed after the rear car's up-stop wheels—which sit underneath the train and below the track—moved out-of-place to the top of the track. The cause of the incident was not released publicly (as the information was considered "proprietary"), but all riders were able to safely exit the ride. El Toro was closed for most of Six Flags Great Adventure's 2021 operating season, pending the outcome of an investigation from Intamin. Although the park was not fined for the accident itself, the park was fined $5k for failing to immediately notify the New Jersey Department of Community Affairs post-incident. In early 2022, it was announced that El Toro would reopen on April 2, 2022.

On August 25, 2022, a malfunction occurred near the end of the ride, causing minor injuries to 14 riders, with five taken to a nearby hospital. The park closed the ride indefinitely, pending an investigation into the incident. An anonymous ride operator alleged that issues from previous incidents had not been fixed, saying in an interview with WCBS-TV: "The employees keep telling them that there is an issue with the pothole and maintenance has done nothing about it." Six Flags officials reported on August 30, 2022, that El Toro's safety systems were working properly and that the ride would reopen after it had been repaired. In September 2022, the New Jersey Department of Community Affairs (DCA) said El Toro was "structurally compromised", which would force El Toro to remain closed indefinitely. The DCA said it would also conduct an engineering review of El Toro and consult with Intamin. Six Flags officials said they expected to reopen the ride for the 2023 season, and it reopened on June 17, 2023.

== Awards and rankings ==
When the ride debuted, it ranked 3rd for "Best New Ride of 2006" in the Golden Ticket Awards.

Golden Ticket Awards: Top wood Roller Coasters
Year									1998	1999
Ranking									–	–
Year	2000	2001	2002	2003	2004	2005	2006	2007	2008	2009
Ranking	–	–	–	–	–	–	13	9	4	3
Year	2010	2011	2012	2013	2014	2015	2016	2017	2018	2019
Ranking	2	3	1	2	2	2	3	1	2	3
Year	2020	2021	2022	2023	2024	2025	2026			
Ranking	N/A	3	3	3	6	3	3			

Preceded by Son of Beast	World's Fastest Wooden Roller Coaster; November 20, 2012 – June 19, 2014	Succeeded by Goliath
