= Monimo Rush =

Wooden roller coaster in South Korea

Monimo RUSH
- Previously known as T Express (2008–2026)
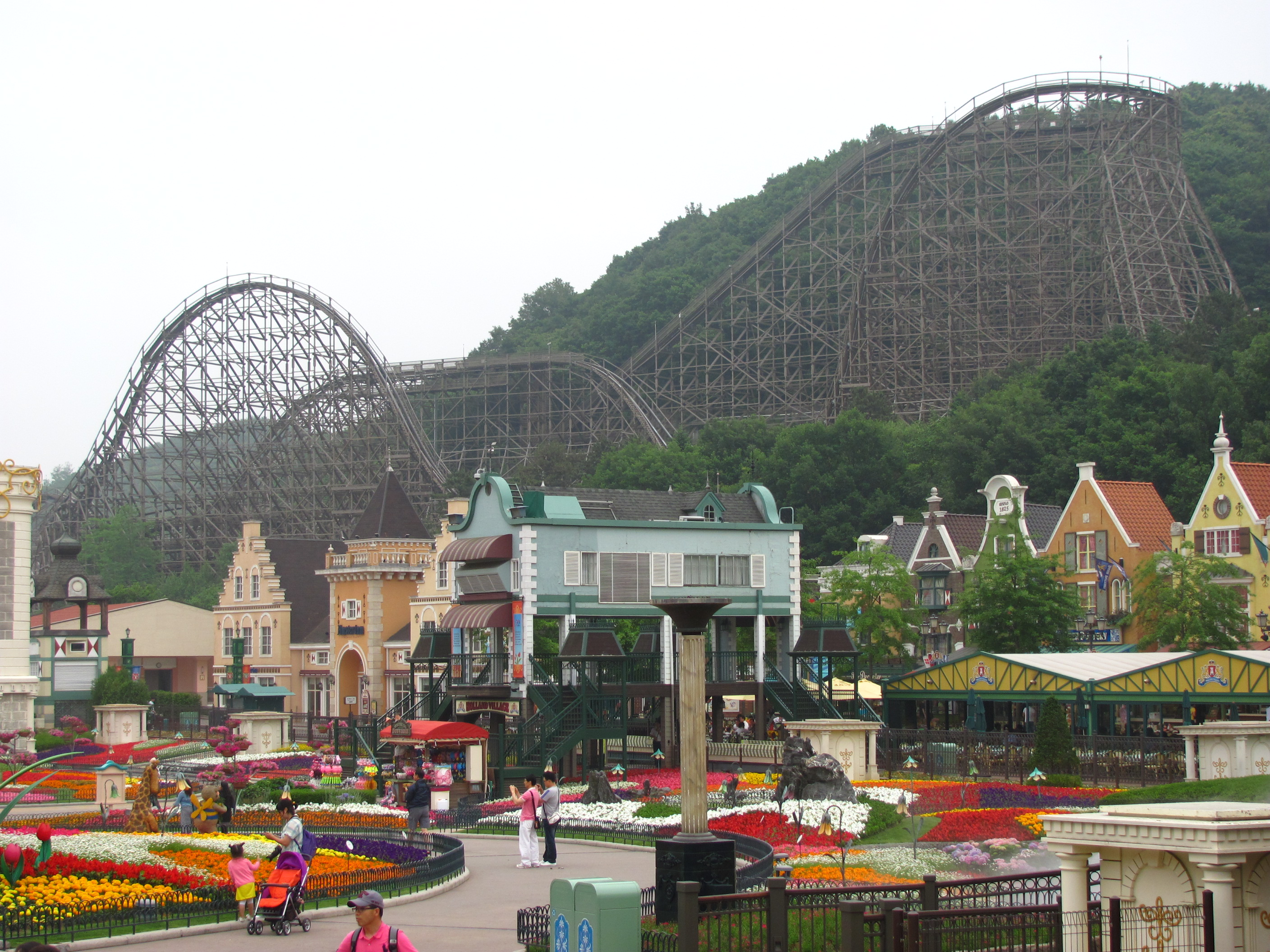
- The ride in June 2011

Everland
- Location: Everland
- Park section: European Adventure
- Coordinates: 37.2900°N 127.2025°E
- Status: Operating
- Opening date: March 14, 2008

General statistics
- Type: Wood
- Manufacturer: Intamin
- Designer: Ing.-Büro Stengel GmbH
- Model: Wooden Coaster (Prefabricated Track)
- Track layout: Terrain / Twister
- Lift/launch system: Cable lift
- Height: 56.02 m (183.8 ft)
- Drop: 45.99 m (150.9 ft)
- Length: 1,641 m (5,384 ft)
- Speed: 103.9 km/h (64.6 mph)
- Max vertical angle: 77°
- Capacity: 1,500 riders per hour
- Trains: 3 trains with 6 cars; riders arranged 2 across in 3 rows for a total of 36 riders per train
- Monimo RUSH at RCDB

Monimo RUSH (Korean: 모니모RUSH), formerly known as T Express (Korean: 티 익스프레스), is a wooden roller coaster at the Everland theme park in Yongin, South Korea. It opened on March 14, 2008, in the European Adventure section of the park, and is themed after a small town in the Alps. The coaster was constructed by Intamin, a Swiss manufacturing company, and designed by Ing.-Büro Stengel GmbH, a German roller coaster design facility. In April 2024, parts of its track underwent a steel retracking by Rocky Mountain Construction. The coaster was renamed to its current name on April 27, 2026.

Within its first six months of operation, it had over a million riders. The ride holds a number of past and current records. It is South Korea's first-ever wooden roller coaster and is also the longest and second-fastest of any roller coaster in the country. As of 2023, it is tied (with Wildfire) for the world's tallest wooden roller coaster, and is also the longest, tallest, fastest, and steepest wooden coaster in Asia.

== History ==
Everland conducted market research and decided to construct a wooden coaster. After developing the concept and plans for three years, and with a budget of 28 billion South Korean won, the park began construction on the ride around February 2007.

It was constructed by Intamin, a Swiss manufacturing company, and designed by Ing.-Büro Stengel GmbH, a German roller coaster design company. Everland first announced the ride in a March 12, 2008 press release, which stated that the ride would help the park "compete with other theme parks such as Universal Studios". The ride opened on March 14, 2008. The roller coaster replaced a snow slope attraction that was previously in the same area.

In June 2022, T Express, as well as the rest of Everland, opened in the metaverse. The ride and park are based in PlayDapp Land, a Roblox-based metaverse blockchain platform. Everland and PlayDapp announced in 2022 that it would also open NFT services. The metaverse version of Everland was designed to make users interact with the system instead of simply looking at the virtual theme park.

T Express was closed for around 5 months prior to a reopening in April 2024 to undergo a steel retracking dubbed "The Iron Rebirth" by Everland officials. About 380 meters of track, including the initial drop, were retracked using steel tracks by Rocky Mountain Construction.

T Express was named after T World, the SK Telecom-owned Korean phone company that sponsored the ride's construction. On April 14, 2026, it was announced by Samsung Financial Networks that T Express would be renamed to Monimo RUSH on April 27, 2026, after Samsung's Monimo app, in addition to Monimo gaining functionalities that allow users to check information about Everland attraction operations, line times, and parking availability. On April 27, 2026, the coaster's rename to Monimo RUSH was made official.

=== Records ===
T Express was the first wooden roller coaster in South Korea. At time of opening, it was the tallest, fastest, and steepest roller coaster in the country, until it was superseded by Draken at Gyeongju World in 2018. However, it is still the longest and third fastest in the country.

It was the third wooden roller coaster constructed in Asia. As of 2026, among wooden roller coasters in Asia, it is the longest, tallest, fastest, and steepest, and also has the largest drop. Among the world's wooden roller coasters, it is the tallest (tied with Wildfire in Sweden), third longest, and tenth fastest as of 2026.

== Characteristics ==
The ride is located in the European Adventure section of Everland, which is based on a European aesthetic. It is themed as a scenic railway in an Alpine village; the area around it was further decorated before the ride's opening. The ride closes its operations in the winter and reopens in the spring.

It is 56.02 metres (183.8 ft) tall, and has 1,641 m (5,384 ft) of prefabricated tracks that are made of nine layers of compressed and laminated Finnish fir wood. The total materials used to create the ride include 670 tons and 45,000 blocks of wood, as well as 50,000 bolts.

It has three trains made of steel and fiberglass. Each train can seat 36, as they each have six cars that have three rows of two seats. Per hour of operation, the ride seats 1,500 people. Riders experience airtime twelve times throughout the ride, with the largest drop being 45.99 m (150.9 ft). The ride has a top speed of 103.9 km/h (64.6 mph).

== Ride experience ==
When the train leaves the station, it climbs up a 56.02 m (183.8 ft) lift hill using a cable lift system, then curves to the right. It then drops to the ground at a 77-degree angle. It then goes back up to a 46 m (151 ft) tall hill and then drops into an intense right-hand turn drop. It then transitions into a left-hand turn and then climbs into a 28 m (92 ft) mid-course brake run, and then drops again. It then goes into an airtime hill, turns right, then climbs a larger airtime hill. It then turns right, going into two back-to-back airtime hills. It then turns left, climbs an airtime hill, and then turns right. It then goes into 2 further back-to-back airtime hills, turns left, two more airtime hills, a slight left-hand turn, an airtime hill, a left-hand turn, and into the final brake run. It runs for about 3 minutes, including the lift hill.

== Incidents ==
In 2018, a group of 6 visitors, including 3 visually impaired people, were prevented from riding the roller coaster because park employees were concerned it would be less safe for them. The visitors filed a disability discrimination lawsuit and won the case. The judge stated that there was no evidence or statistics to demonstrate that blind people were in more danger on the rides.

== Reception ==
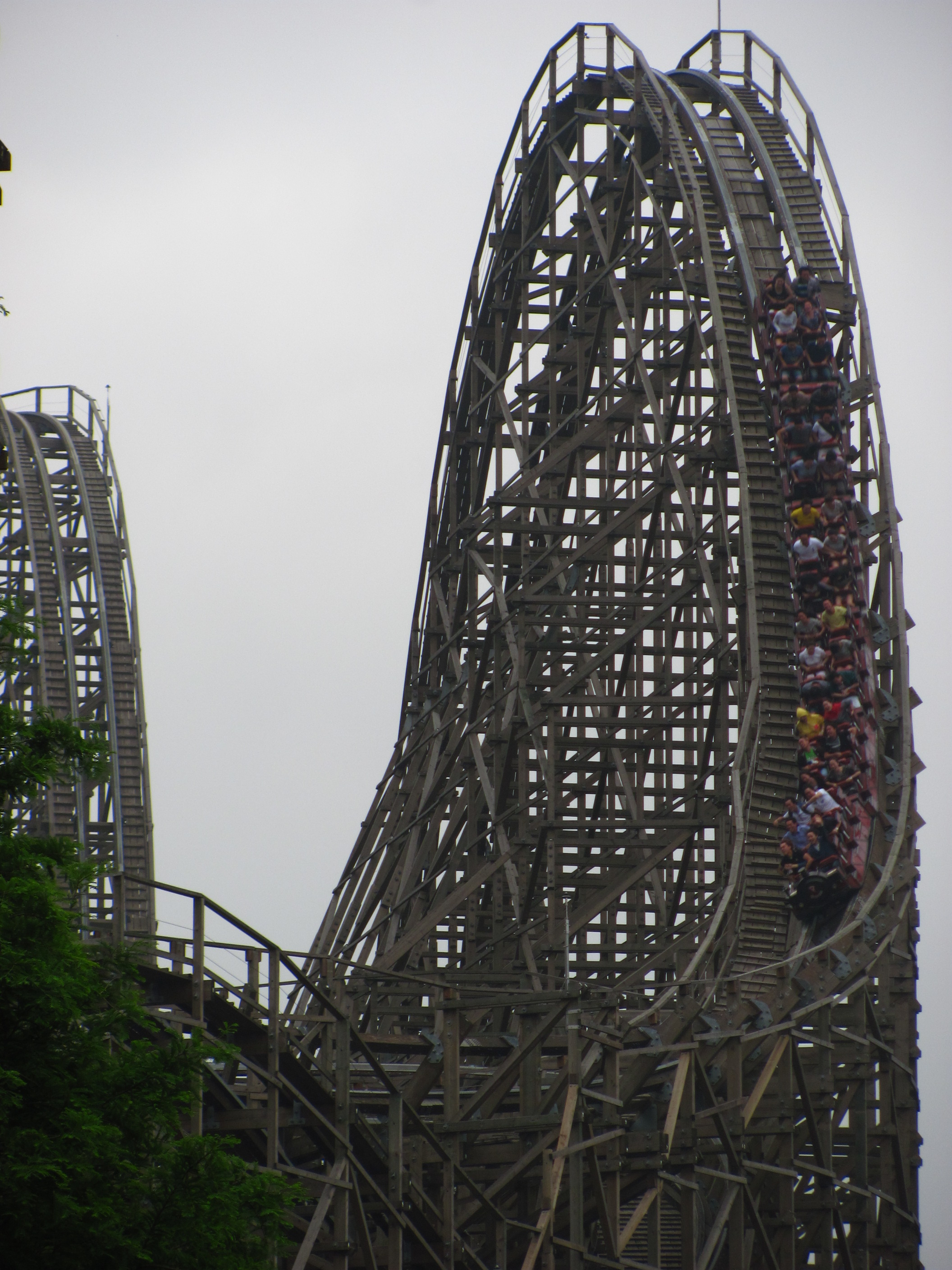
Riders on a drop in June 2011

The ride caused more people to visit Everland. According to a 2009 press release, the number of teenagers who visited the park increased by 73% and the number of college students by 14%. That same press release noted that three out of ten visitors to Everland rode T Express.

It had more than one million total riders within six months, more than 1,758,800 within its first year, around 3,000,000 within two years, and close to 5,000,000 by 2011. In 2010, it was reported that an average of 4,500 people rode the roller coaster each day.

=== Awards ===
Golden Ticket Awards: Top wood Roller Coasters
Year									1998	1999
Ranking									–	–
Year	2000	2001	2002	2003	2004	2005	2006	2007	2008	2009
Ranking	–	–	–	–	–	–	–	–	–	46
Year	2010	2011	2012	2013	2014	2015	2016	2017	2018	2019
Ranking	36	39	46 (tie)	41 (tie)	–	47	44	–	45	37
Year	2020	2021	2022	2023	2024	2025	2026			
Ranking	N/A	50	39	38	44	42	34 (tie)			

Preceded by El Toro	World's Steepest Wooden Roller Coaster; June 2009 – March 2013	Succeeded by Outlaw Run
