= Herky and Timmy's Racing Coaster =

Junior coaster in Everland, South Korea

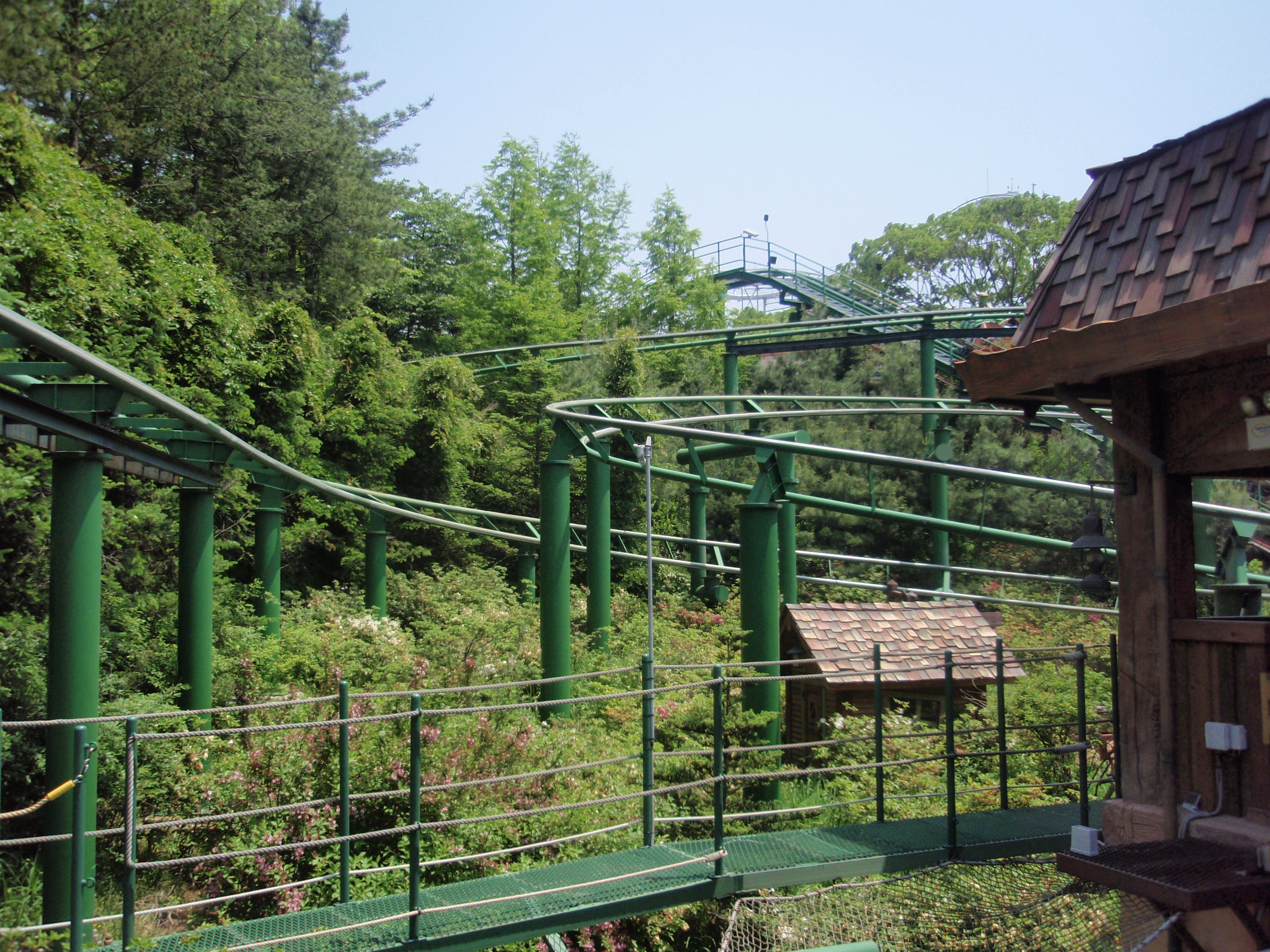

Everland
- Location: Everland
- Park section: Magic Land - Aesop's Village
- Coordinates: 37.2938°N 127.2005°E
- Status: Operating
- Opening date: October 1, 2005

General statistics
- Type: Steel – Family
- Designer: Vekoma
- Model: Junior Coaster
- Length: 1,030.2 ft (314.0 m)
- Inversions: 0
- Duration: 1.02 min
- Herky and Timmy's Racing Coaster at RCDB

Herky and Timmy's Racing Coaster (Korean: 레이싱코스터) is a Vekoma Junior Coaster in Everland, Yongin, South Korea which opened on October 1, 2005. It is located in the Aesop's Village section of the park, which was created to celebrate Everland's 30th anniversary. The ride itself is themed after The Tortoise and the Hare, an Aesop fable. The roller coaster initially went forwards, but after a New Year's Day event during December 2019 to February 2020, it started to go backwards. Herky and Timmy's Racing Coaster is South Korea's first roller coaster to go backwards.

== History ==
In February 2005, Everland started developing its Aesop's Village section, which is a children's zone with themes referencing Aesop's Fables. The section was created to celebrate the 30th anniversary of Everland, which would be the following year. Aesop Village was set to be finished around October 1 the same year. In September the same year, Herky and Timmy's Racing Coaster, which was set to be themed after The Tortoise and the Hare, was revealed. The roller coaster opened on October 1 along with the rest of Aesop's Village. The coaster was designed by Stefan Holtman and constructed by Vekoma.

== Ride experience ==
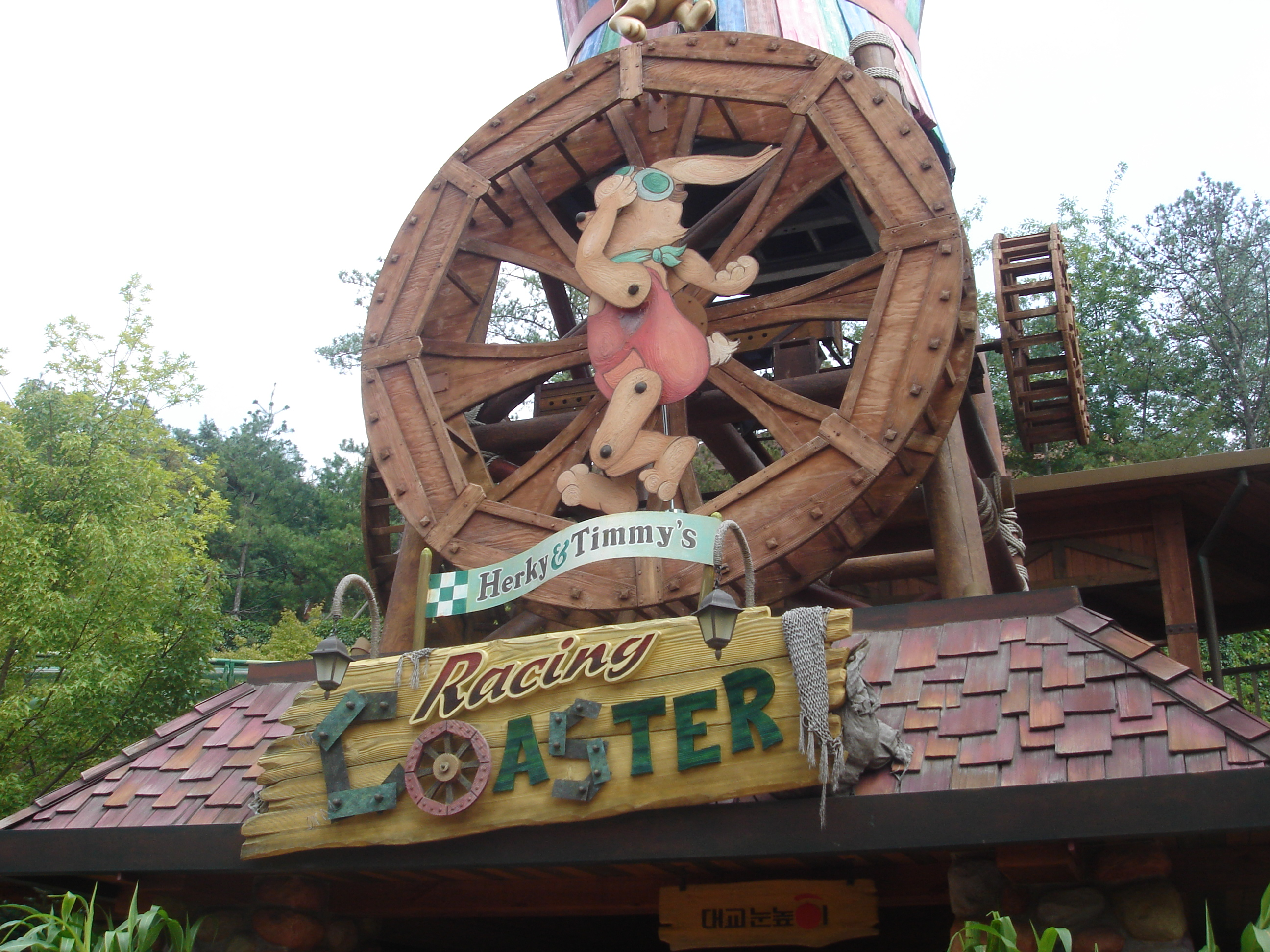
Entrance to Herky and Timmy's Racing Coaster

The coaster initially goes up a lift hill, then falls slightly to the left. It then falls down another time, goes right, then left and right again and returns to its station. The coaster has two trains with ten cars per train, with two riders across per row, and thus can have 20 riders per each run. Herky and Timmy's Racing Coaster's tracks are 1030.2 ft long and made of steel, and the ride runs for 1.02 min. The coaster is themed after The Tortoise and the Hare, an Aesop fable, due to its location in Aesop's Village. The ride initially went forwards, but starting from December 2019 to February 2020, the rollercoaster went backwards as part of Everland's New Year's Day event. Herky and Timmy's Racing Coaster was the first roller coaster in South Korea to go backwards. The rollercoaster currently continues to go backwards after the New Year's Day event.
