= Rolling Thunder (roller coaster) =

Defunct amusement ride

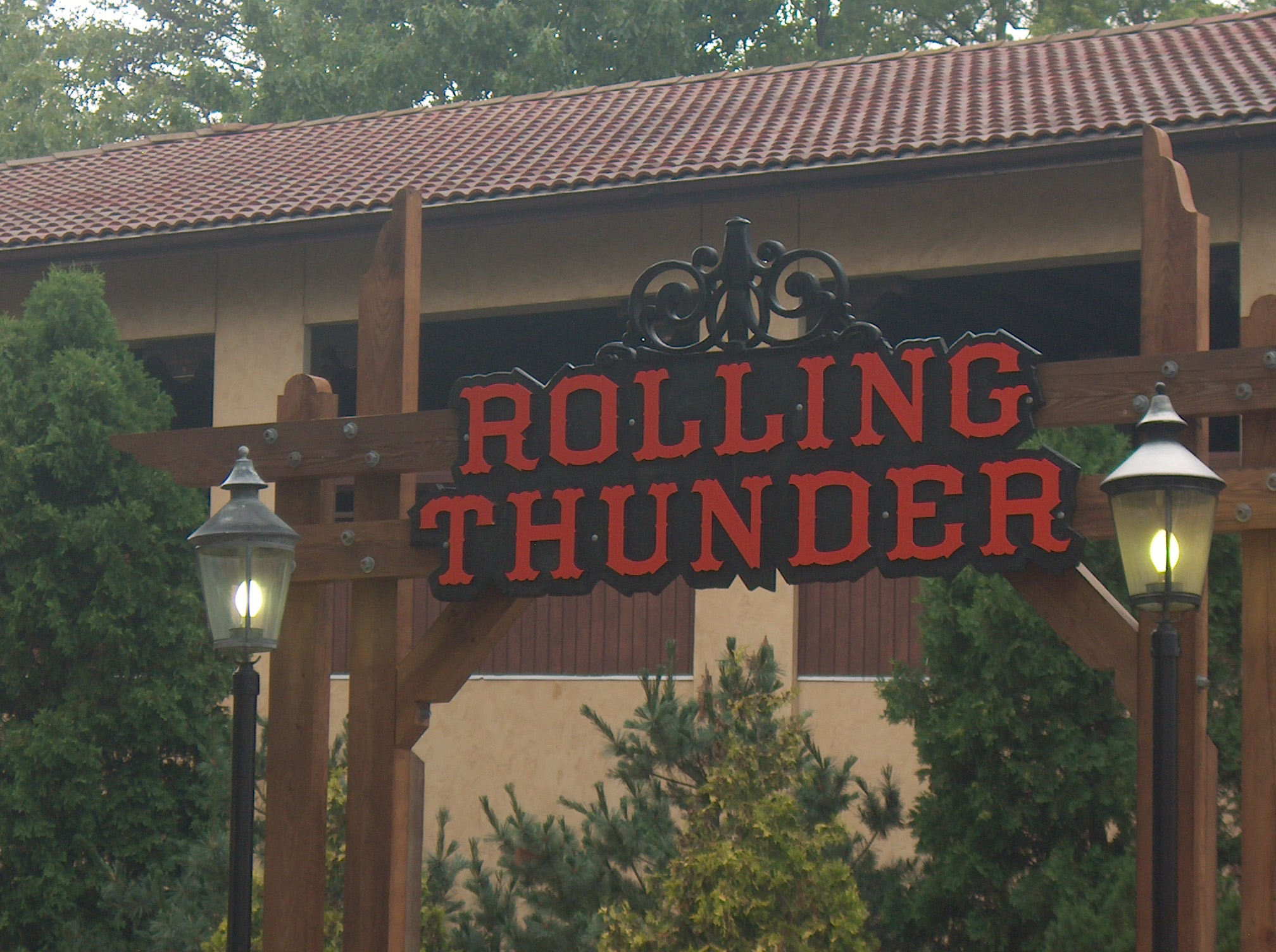
- Rolling Thunder's entrance (2006)

Six Flags Great Adventure
- Park section: Plaza del Carnaval
- Coordinates: 40°08′21.70″N 74°26′3.40″W
- Status: Removed
- Opening date: June 6, 1979
- Closing date: September 8, 2013
- Replaced by: Zumanjaro: Drop of Doom; El Diablo

General statistics
- Type: Wood – Racing
- Manufacturer: William Cobb & Associates
- Designer: Don Rosser & William Cobb
- Model: Racing roller coaster
- Track layout: Figure 8/Out and back
- Lift/launch system: Chain lift hill
- Height: 96 ft (29.3 m)
- Length: 3,200 ft (975.4 m)
- Speed: 56 mph (90.1 km/h)
- Inversions: 0
- Duration: 2:10
- Max vertical angle: 45°
- Capacity: 3840 riders per hour
- Height restriction: 44 in (112 cm)
- Trains: 4 trains with 4 cars. Riders are arranged 2 across in 3 rows for a total of 24 riders per train.
- Flash Pass was Available
- Rolling Thunder at RCDB; Pictures of Rolling Thunder at RCDB

Rolling Thunder was a racing roller coaster located at Six Flags Great Adventure in Jackson Township, New Jersey. Designed by William Cobb, it opened in 1979 as the park's first wooden coaster during its fifth operating season. Rolling Thunder closed permanently in 2013 to make room for Zumanjaro: Drop of Doom, which opened in 2014 and was removed in 2024.

== History ==
Rolling Thunder opened on June 6, 1979. To mark the 100th anniversary of roller coasters in the US, Rolling Thunder's Coaster 2nd side was renamed "Rednuht Gnillor", the backwards spelling of "Rolling Thunder", in 1984. The trains were turned around so that riders could view the ride while riding backwards. During this season, Rednuht Gnillor's warning signs were placed in the back of the station and on the back of the lift hill so that riders could see them.

Rolling Thunder did not operate from Fall 2005 through Spring 2006 due to construction of the "Plaza del Carnival" section of the park and the new El Toro roller coaster. The ride closed permanently on September 8, 2013, to "make room" for Zumanjaro: Drop of Doom, which opened the following year in 2014. Despite being attached to Kingda Ka's support structure and not itself interfering with Rolling Thunder, the queue for Zumanjaro partially crosses through an area where Rolling Thunder once stood. In 2015, the entrance sign and former queue line for Rolling Thunder were reused for "El Diablo", a Larson International ride similar to the Larson "Fire Ball" carnival ride, a flat ride that Six Flags has classified as a roller coaster in several of their parks.

== Ride experience ==
=== Queue ===
The line for the ride began at an adjoining entrance and had separate queues for each track. The queue to the right of the entrance lead to the Coaster 1 track and Coaster 2 was reached by the queue on the left. Guests who were not tall enough for coasters with 54-inch (137 cm) minimum height rode Rolling Thunder, which had a 44-inch (112 cm) height requirement.

=== Layout ===
Unlike most racing coasters, Rolling Thunder's tracks were not always next to each other, they separated at several points in the ride. After the first drop, the left track traveled over a big hill, followed by a small hill, whereas the second track reversed that. On the turnaround at the back, the left track traveled up and made a level turn, while the right track traveled up and dropped while turning. The hills on the return segment were also staggered. The trains were not always raced.

=== Track ===
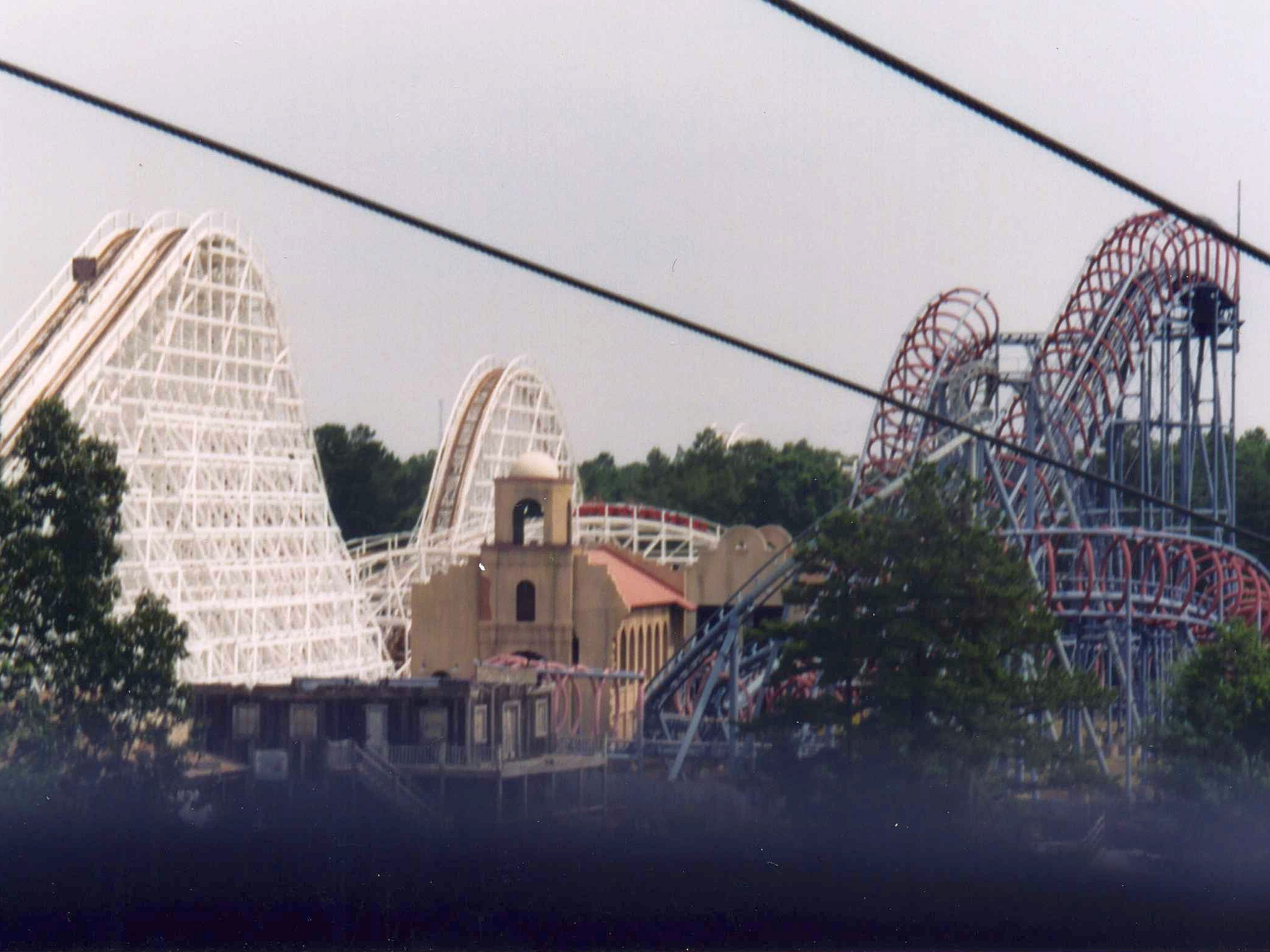
2003 photo showing lift hill and portion of Rolling Thunder's tracks on left (Viper is on the right)

The structure and track were mostly built from 850,000 feet (259,080 m) of Douglas fir. In the past, the Douglas fir had been treated with pesticides which were not considered environmentally friendly and the track and supports were slowly being replaced with southern yellow pine.

The track was made by bolting seven layers of wood. In most places on the ride, there were two layers of southern yellow pine, which sat on top of five layers of Douglas fir. Older sections of track still had seven layers of Douglas fir (mostly on the lift) and there were refurbished sections of track with seven layers of southern pine. A 7-inch-wide (180 mm) strip of steel was bolted onto the top layer of wood track and three-inch-wide pieces of steel were bolted onto the sides.

==== Brakes ====
Rolling Thunder used skid brakes to stop the trains rather than modern fin brakes. The trains had brake pads underneath each car which slid against the brakes to lift the train's wheels off the track. The brakes were always in the up position unless the operator, in conjunction with the rear unloader attendant, advanced a train. The road wheels were heard spinning at the end of the ride and continued to spin until the operator, in conjunction with the unload attendant, advanced the train.

There were three sets of brakes. The trim and ready brakes were located in the tunnel at the end of the ride. The trim brake slowed and stopped the train and served as a holding place for one train until the second train left the station. The train was advanced off the trim and onto the ready brake. The ready brake held the train until the second train reached the top half of the lift hill. The dispatch brake held the train in the station while it was being unloaded and loaded for the next ride. The trains were stopped manually and were not always aligned with the queue stalls in the station. Therefore, the attendants had to direct the guests to their rows from time to time before the airgates were opened.

When the brake pads and wheels were wet, there was little friction to stop the trains and they slid too far onto the brakes. For safety reasons, only one train ran per side in rainy weather.

=== Trains ===
There were four trains that were distinguishable by color: red, blue, yellow and green. Each train had four three-bench Philadelphia Toboggan Coasters cars held together by hitch bars. Each car contained six seats. Each train held a maximum of 24 riders.

The trains used buzz bars that locked in one position. Seat dividers and headrests were added in 1981 to prevent people from standing on the ride while it was in operation. Seat belts were added on the ride's 30th anniversary.

There were three types of wheels used on the trains. Sixteen road wheels rode on the steel layer on top of the track. Sixteen guide wheels guided the trains around the turned on a separate steel track located on the sides of the wooden track. Sixteen upstop wheels rode on the bottom of the track.

== Accident ==
On August 16, 1981, a 20-year-old park employee from Middletown, New Jersey, fell from the coaster to his death during a routine test run. An investigation by the New Jersey Labor Department concluded that he may not have secured himself with the safety bar. A park representative later confirmed this conclusion, saying that the employee "may have assumed an unauthorized riding position that did not make use of safety restraints". The ride was inspected and the Labor Department concluded that the ride was "operationally and mechanically sound".

== See also ==
- 2013 in amusement parks
