= Everland =

Theme park in Yongin, South Korea

- Previously known as Yongin Farmland
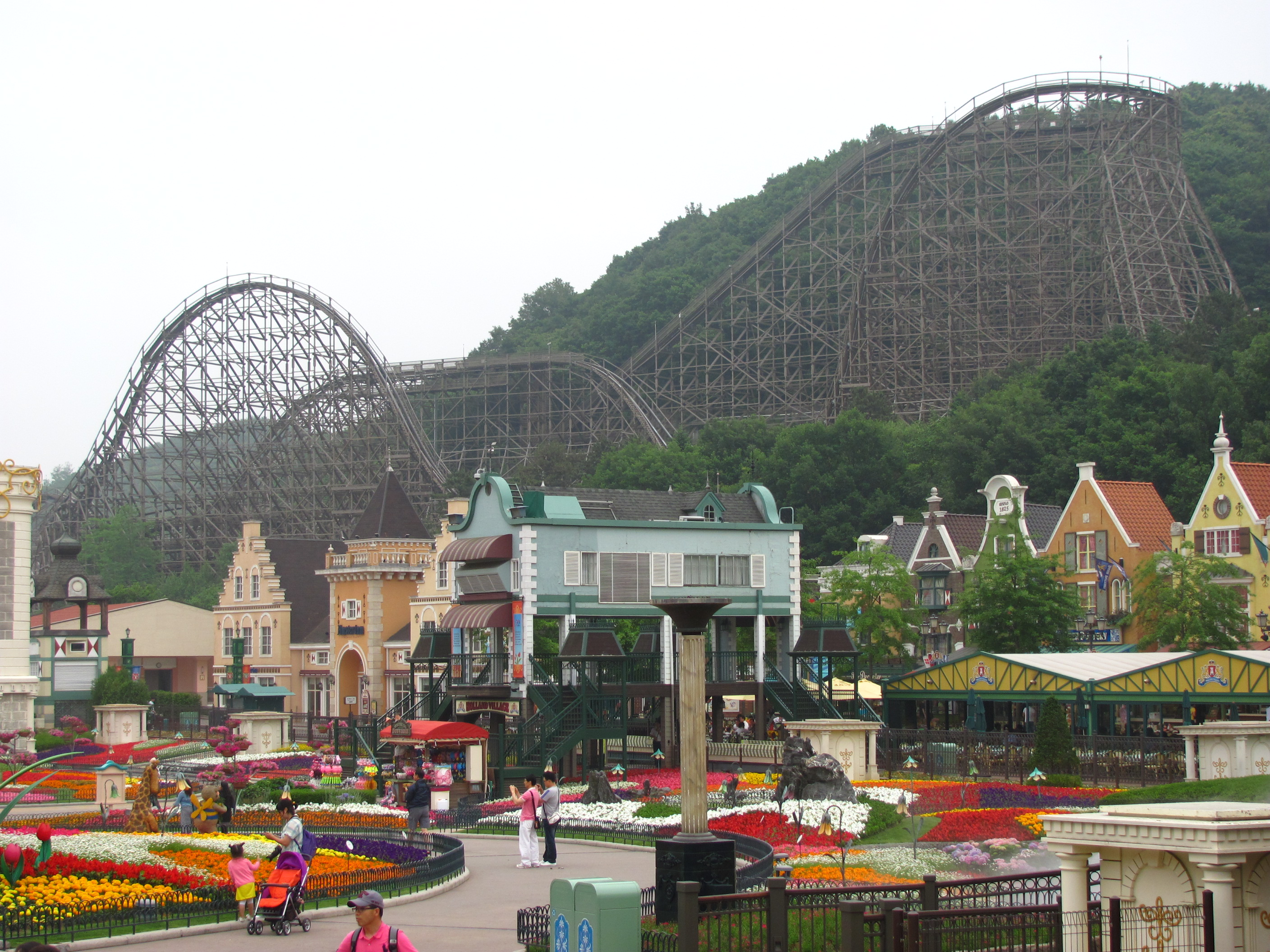
- Interactive map of Everland
- Location: Everland Resort, Yongin, Gyeonggi Province, South Korea
- Coordinates: 37°17′38″N 127°12′10″E
- Opened: 1976
- Owner: Samsung C&T Resort & Construction Group
- Operating season: Year-round
- Attendance: 5.85 million
- Area: 250 acres

Attractions
- Roller coasters: 4
- Website: Official website

Everland (Korean: 에버랜드) is South Korea's largest theme park. It is located at the Everland Resort in Yongin, Gyeonggi Province. In 2018, it received 5.85 million visitors and was ranked 19th in the world for amusement park attendance. As of 2010, Everland is measured to be approximately 1,200,000 square yards. Along with its main attractions, Everland includes a zoo and water park known as Caribbean Bay. Everland is operated by Samsung C&T Corporation (formerly known as Samsung Everland, Cheil Industries), a subsidiary of the Samsung Group.

It first opened under the name Yongin Farmland (용인자연농원; lit. 'Yongin Natural Farm'), and received its current name in 1996.

The park is accessible by public transportation (buses and the EverLine railway), as well as by dedicated shuttle buses that stop by various places in Seoul.

== History ==
Construction on the park first began in 1968. Initially, plans existed to build the park in Anseong, but that city ultimately declined to host it. It eventually opened to the public on April 18, 1976 under the name "Yongin Farmland" (용인자연농원; lit. 'Yongin Natural Farm'). At the time of its opening, admission fees were 600 won for adults and 300 won for children. (Note: For reference, the subway fare in Seoul at the time was 40 won.) For its first year in operation, it received 880,000 visitors.

The park initially had an area of 1,500 ha (3,700 acres), and was mostly themed around nature. It had around 200 species of animals and an orchard with fruit trees. The park was also agriculturally productive, and shipped products abroad. Visitors were able to go on "safaris" to see exotic animals, such as lions, tigers, and giraffes. The park was the first in East Asia to offer a safari experience with free ranging lions. Until the 1990s, an acrobatics show featuring boars was a popular attraction in the park. The park also had a rose garden with 3,500 roses of 122 species.

The park initially offered 9 rides: the "Jet Coaster" (제트열차), a carousel, a sports car ride, boat rides, a chair swing ride, and spinning teacups. Around the 1980s, the number of rides was significantly expanded. Additions included a flume ride (1981), Space Ferris Wheel (우주관람차; 1982), Viking (1983), Flying Dragon Train (비룡열차; 1986), and Fantasy Express (환상특급; 1988). A facility for sledding now called "Snow Buster" (스노우 버스터) also opened in January 1988; it was the first of its kind in South Korea. In 1989, it opened an exhibition about dinosaurs, and in 1991 it opened an exhibition about mummies. In 1992 it opened the roller coaster Eagle's Fortress (독수리 요새). The Amazon Express (아마존 익스프레스) opened in 1994.

They introduced several more safari options, including a tiger safari (1980), a bear safari (1990), and a herbivore safari (2010). In June 1986, they began running a Rose Festival, which one JoongAng Ilbo reporter claims was the first flower festival in South Korea. The park also began a tulip garden, which began hosting its own festivals in April 1992.

For its 20th anniversary in 1996, the park changed its name to "Everland". That July, it also opened its water park Caribbean Bay: the first such water park in South Korea. Caribbean Bay reached 1 million visitors 13 months after opening.

In 2001, it had 9.1 million visitors, making it the sixth most visited theme park in the world.

In 2008, it opened South Korea's first wooden roller coaster, T Express. The ride has since remained popular.

For the 45th anniversary of the park in 2021, it opened a Natural Farm Homage Garden (자연농원 오마주 가든) as a tribute to the park's beginnings. It also had a number of events and exhibits that evoked the technology of the time, as well as the history of the park.

By 2024, the park had around 270 million visitors total throughout its history.

== Themed areas ==
Everland is divided into five zones: Global Fair, Zootopia, European Adventure, Magic Land, and American Adventure.

=== Global Fair ===
Global Fair is primarily a place for food, souvenirs, and pictures as visitors enter and exit the park. There are shops and restaurants, also services such as rental stroller and lockers.

=== Zootopia ===
Zootopia is an animal-themed zone. There is a small zoo with a variety of animals including birds, giant pandas, sea lions, penguins, bears, lions, tigers, and primates. A safari bus ride is also available, allowing visitors to watch some of the animals while on the move, such as ligers and bears, roaming in a contained habitat. The visitors stay on the bus. Amazon Express is a raft ride, where most visitors get splashed with water. There was also a petting zoo contains farm animals and small domestic animals such as goats and sheep to pet. Kosik, one of Zootopia's elephants, made it to the headlines when he demonstrated an ability to imitate Korean words. In 2016, giant pandas Aibao and Lebao arrived at Everland. In 2020, Aibao gave birth to her daughter Fubao. Fubao is the first giant panda to be born in South Korea, In 2023, Aibao gave birth to twin daughters Ruibao and Huibao.

=== European Adventure ===
European Adventure has restaurants with European architectural styles. There is a flower garden encircled by a train, games and arcades. It includes the Mystery Mansion attraction, in which visitors can shoot at ghosts. In March 2008, a ride named "T Express" was added. It is the first roller-coaster in South Korea to be constructed out of wood.

=== Magic Land ===
Magic Land encloses a display of buildings and rides. There is a section called Aesop's Village where the characters and themes are primarily drawn from the fables of Aesop. The Ferris wheel provided views of the whole park until it closed in 2011 to allow for more rides. There is a log flume, a futuristic flying ride, and a robot ride. Along with the rides, there are restaurants and stands.

=== American Adventure ===
Themes from American history are presented in this portion of the park. There is one Western themed ride located in this section called 'Rodeo'.

In Rock Ville, the theme is the 1950s and its music. The Double Rock Spin is a main attraction where live bands play near the Rolling X-Train, one of the roller coasters in the park.

== Attractions ==
=== Roller Coasters ===
Ride	Year opened	Manufacturer	Description
T Express, now MonimoRUSH	2008	Intamin AG	South Korea's longest and second-fastest coaster, and the country's first wooden coaster. It is the steepest wooden coaster in Asia.
Eagle's Fortress (now defunct)	1992	Arrow Dynamics	South Korea's first suspended coaster. Limited to 40 miles per hour (64 km/h) by a trim brake on the drop when opening, but later reached 52 miles per hour (84 km/h) when the trim brake was eliminated.
Rolling-X Train	1988	Arrow Dynamics (Trains built by Vekoma)	Built to celebrate the 1988 Seoul Olympics. Two loops and two corkscrews. It was formerly named Fantasy Express.
Herky and Timmy's Racing Coaster	2020 (Built in 2005)	Vekoma	A Family backdrop roller coaster placed in Aesop's village.
Blue Dragon Coaster	1987	Zamperla	A two circuit powered roller coaster.

==== T Express ====
T Express, which opened in 2008, is the first wooden roller coaster and the largest in South Korea. It is the 3rd longest wooden coaster in the world at 5,838 feet (1,779 m) long. The steepest point is the first drop, having an angle of 77 degrees. Its name is based on T World, a Korean wireless phone company run by SK Telecom which sponsored the ride.

=== Jigu Maul (Global Village) ===
The Jigu Maul (which means "Global village") was established in August 1985 as the first dark boat ride in South Korea. It shows worldwide traditions, cultural customs, scenery with dolls and iconic miniatures from more than 18 countries, similar to the "It's a Small World" attraction at Disney Parks. However, due to safety reasons, it was torn down in 2016. Currently, there is a children's playground in the same location, called "Hide Away".

==== Characteristics of Jigu Maul ====
- Europe has dolls representing Netherlands, Germany, Austria, Italy, France, England, Spain and Sweden.
- The Arctic and North Pole feature dolls representing Scandinavia.
- America has dolls representing Brazil, Mexico and the United States with a miniaturized Golden Gate in San Francisco, Times Square and the Statue of Liberty in New York City.
- Africa has wild animals with natural forests and dolls representing Egypt, South Africa, Ethiopia, Uganda and Kenya's ethnic group of Maasai people.
- Asia has dolls representing India, China with a miniaturized Tiantan (Temple of Heaven) in Beijing, Japan with Matsuri folk-dancing, Korea with traditional percussion performance named Samulnori and fan dancing named Buchaechum at a miniaturized Namdaemun in Seoul.

=== Tulip Festival ===
Everland hosts the Tulip Festival from March to April each year. There are also special performances such as musicals and parades.

=== Winter Festival ===
Everland also hosts seasonal events during winter, including the Christmas Fantasy festival.

== Attendance ==
2008	2009	2010	2011	2012	2013	2014	2015	2016	2017	2018	Worldwide rank
6,600,000	6,169,000	6,884,000	6,570,000	N/A	7,303,000	7,381,000	7,423,000	7,200,000	6,310,000	5,850,000	19

== Gallery ==
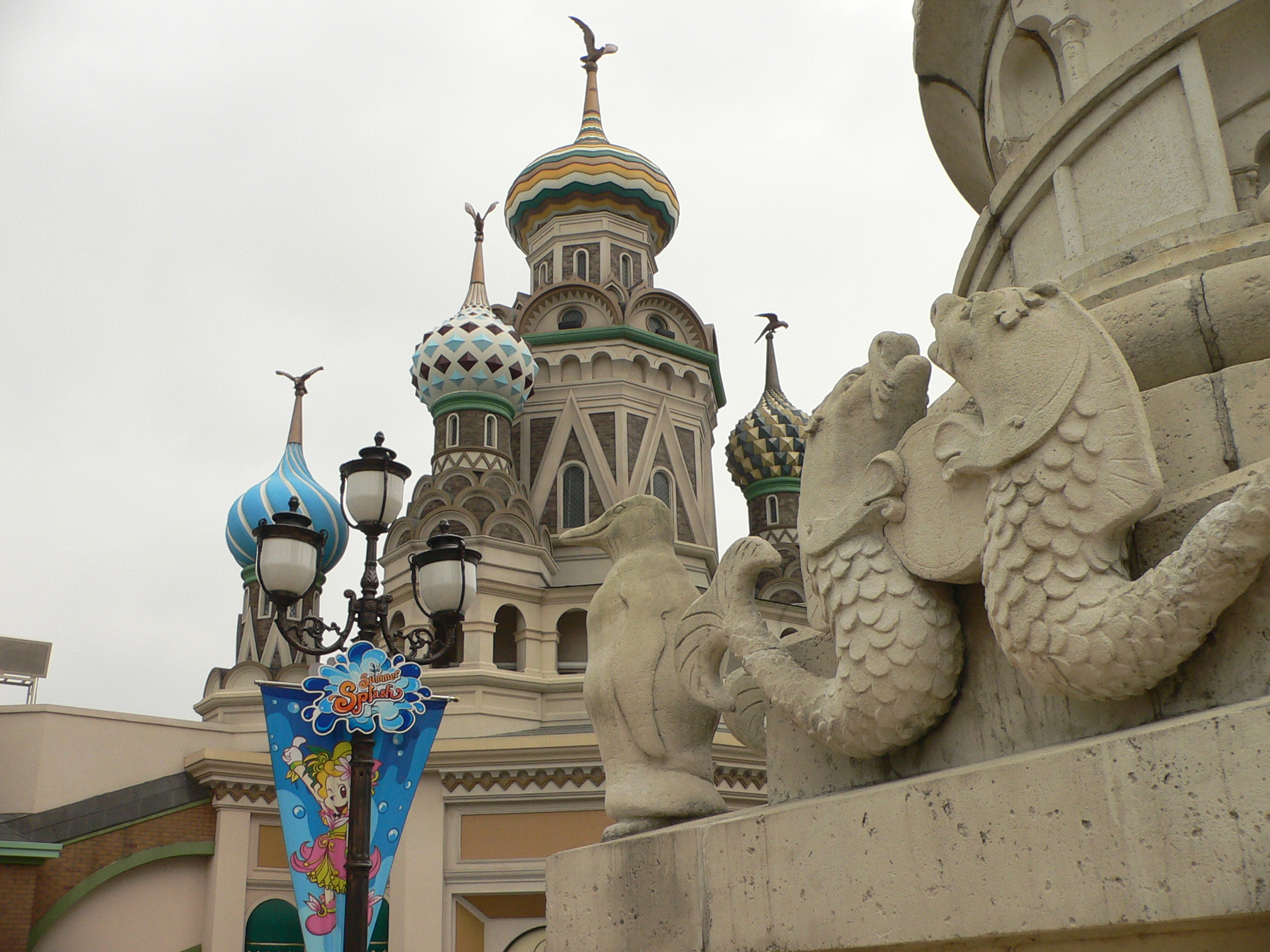

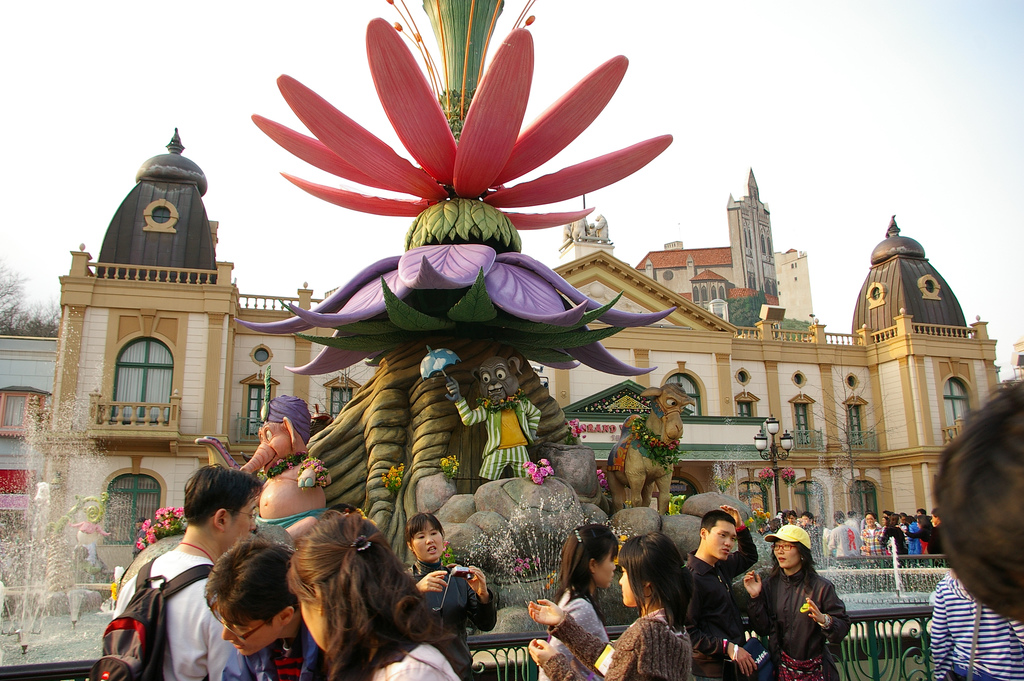

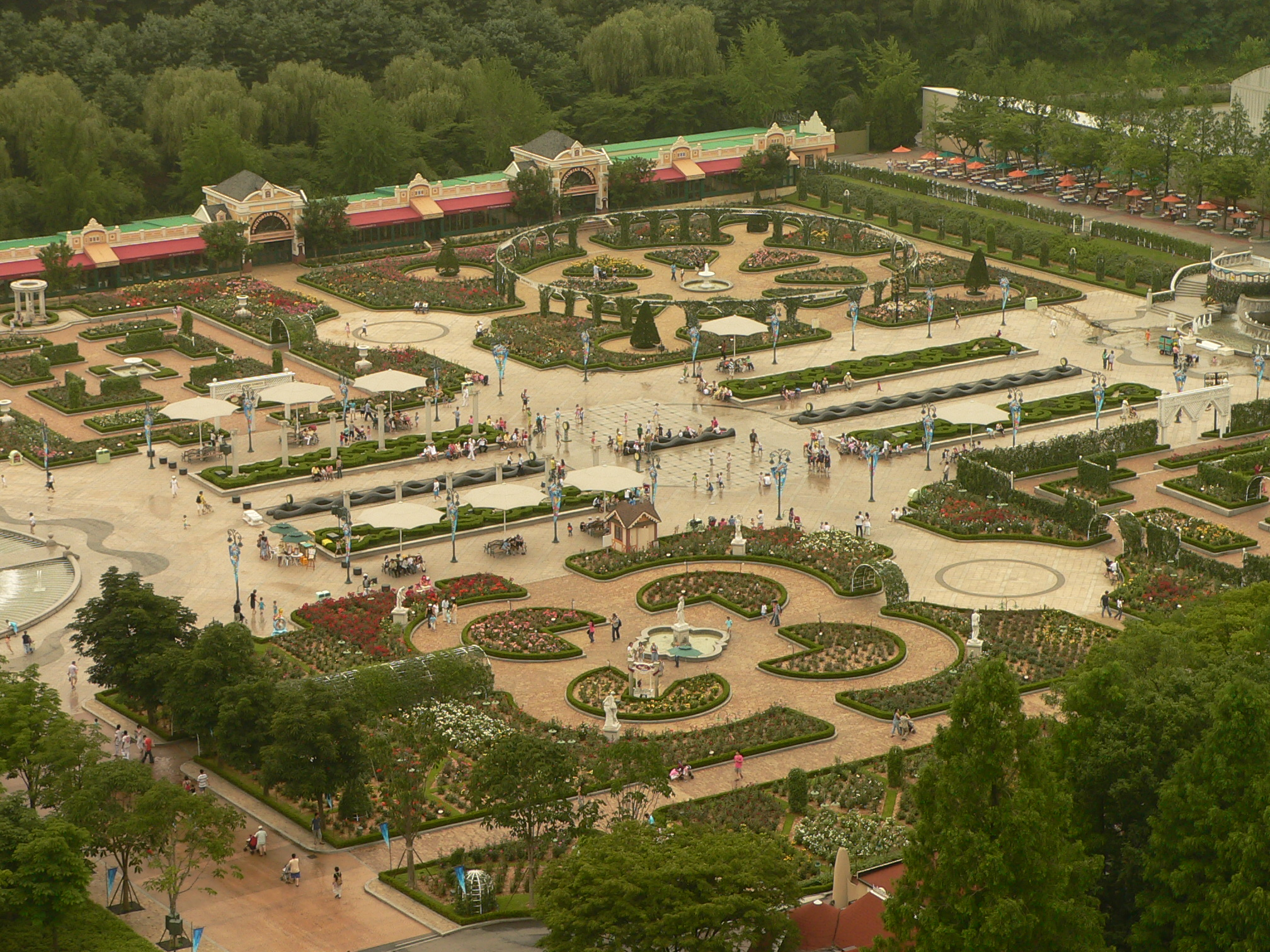

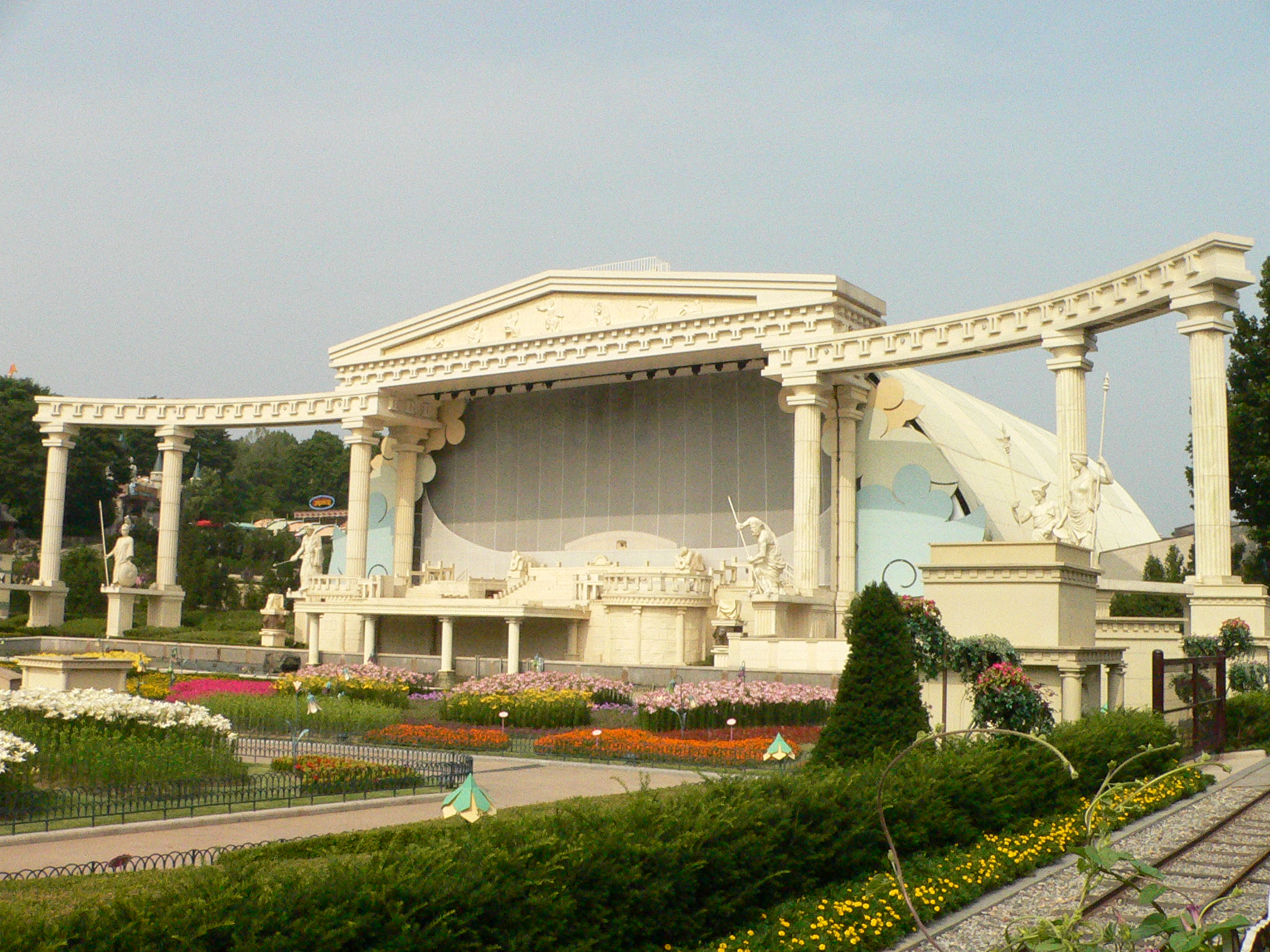

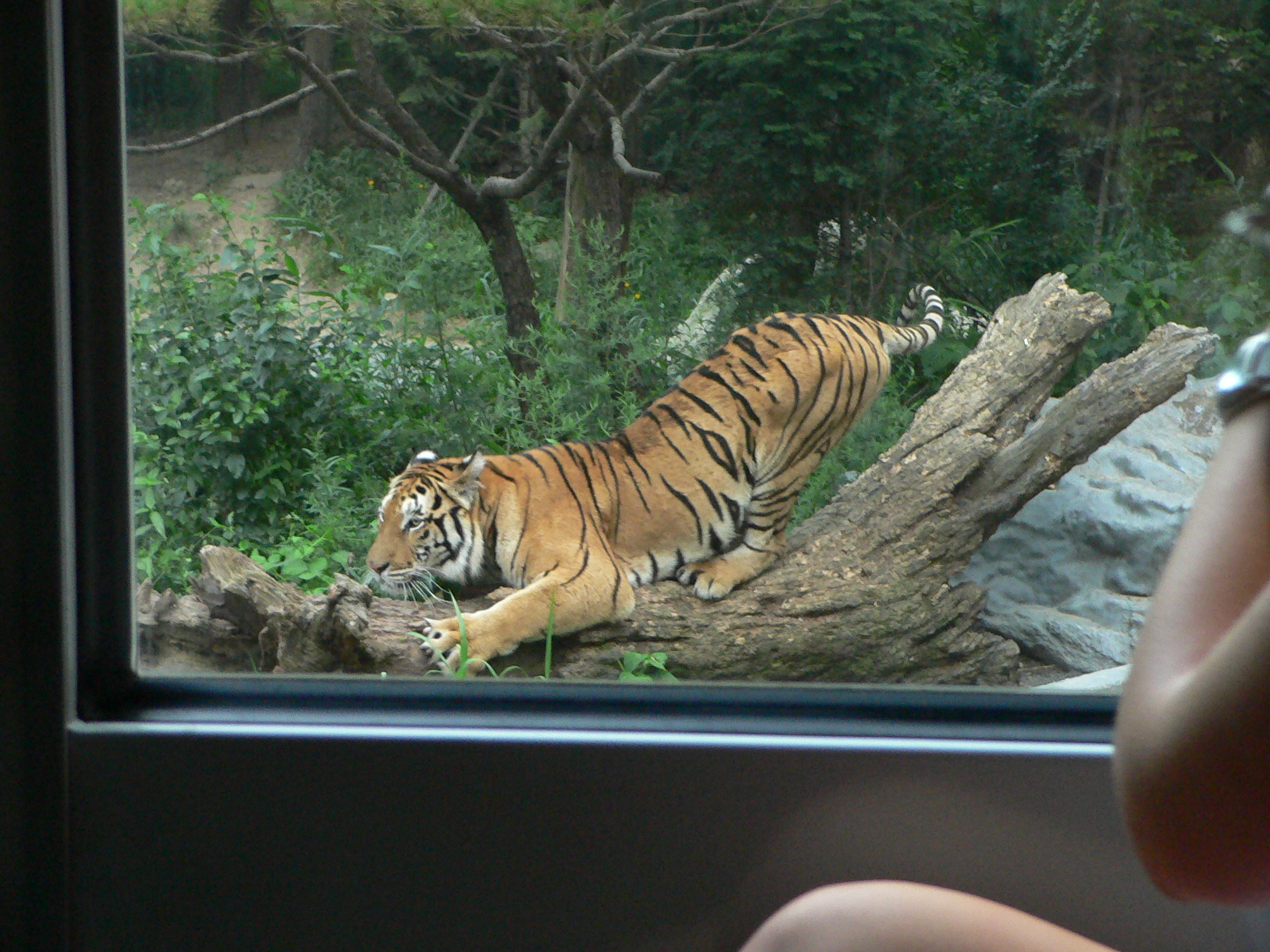
View of a crouching tiger from a Safari Adventure bus

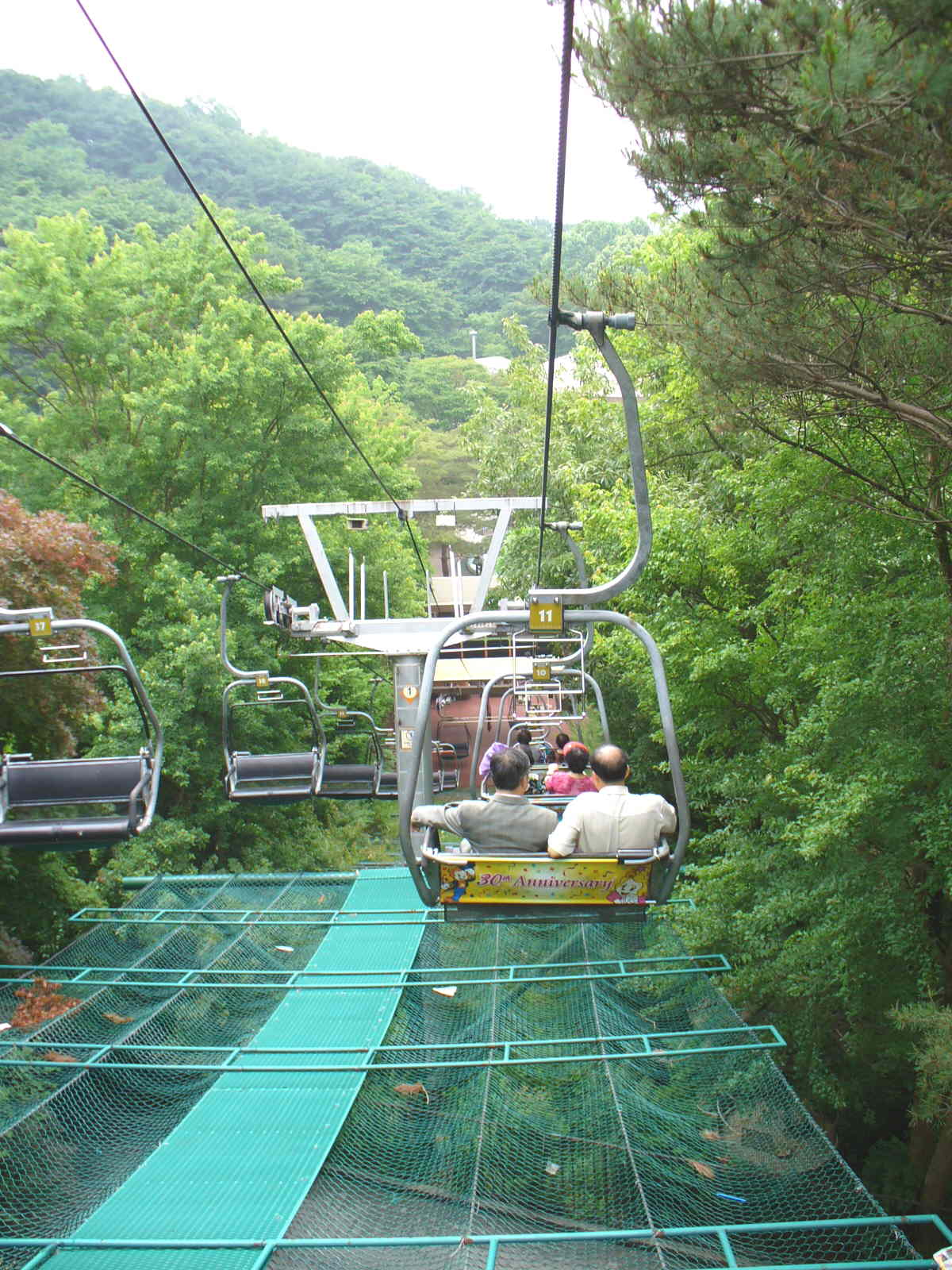
The skyline ride (like a ski lift) is a popular way to get from one section of Everland to another

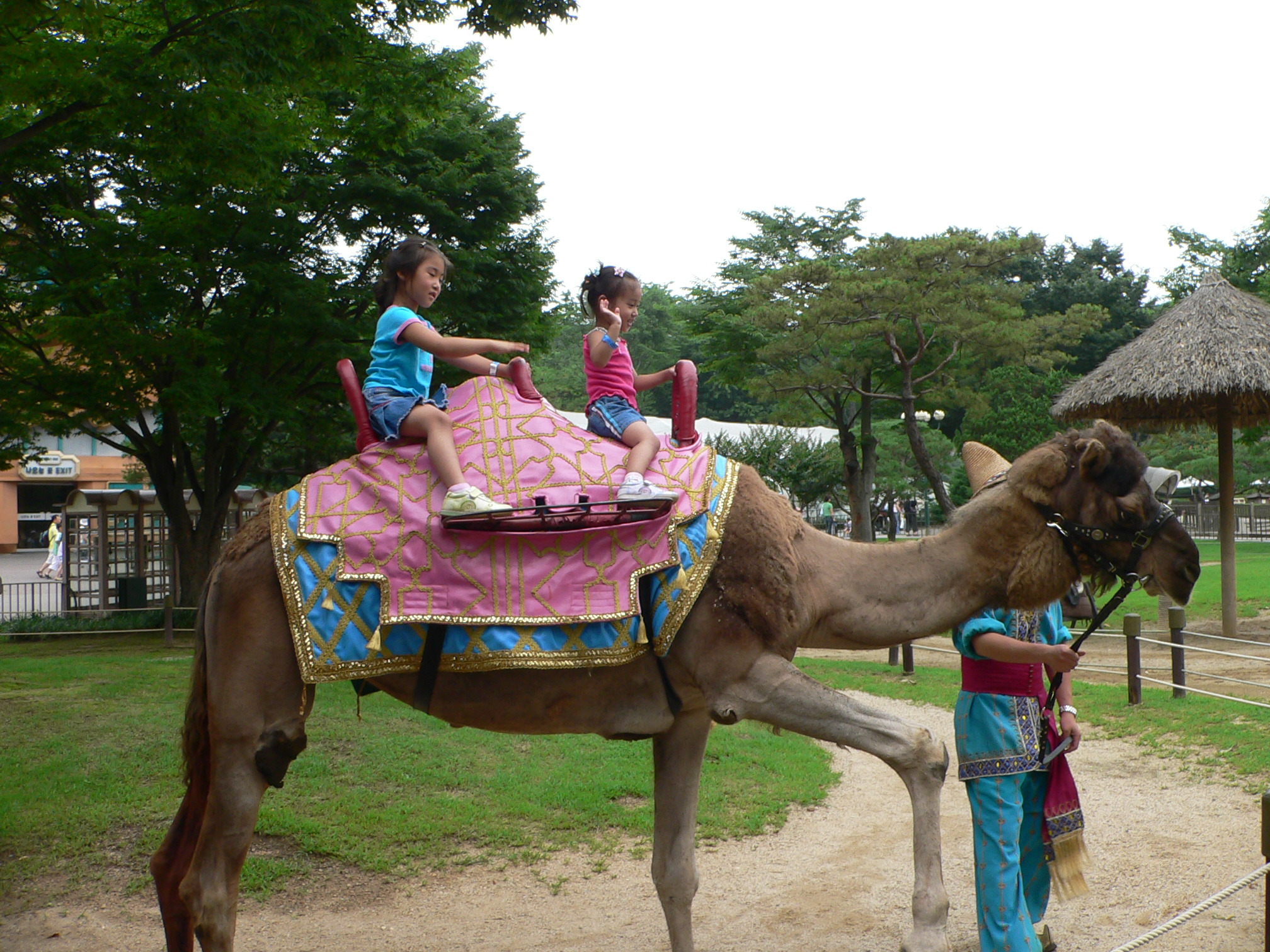
Children riding on the dromedary at Everland

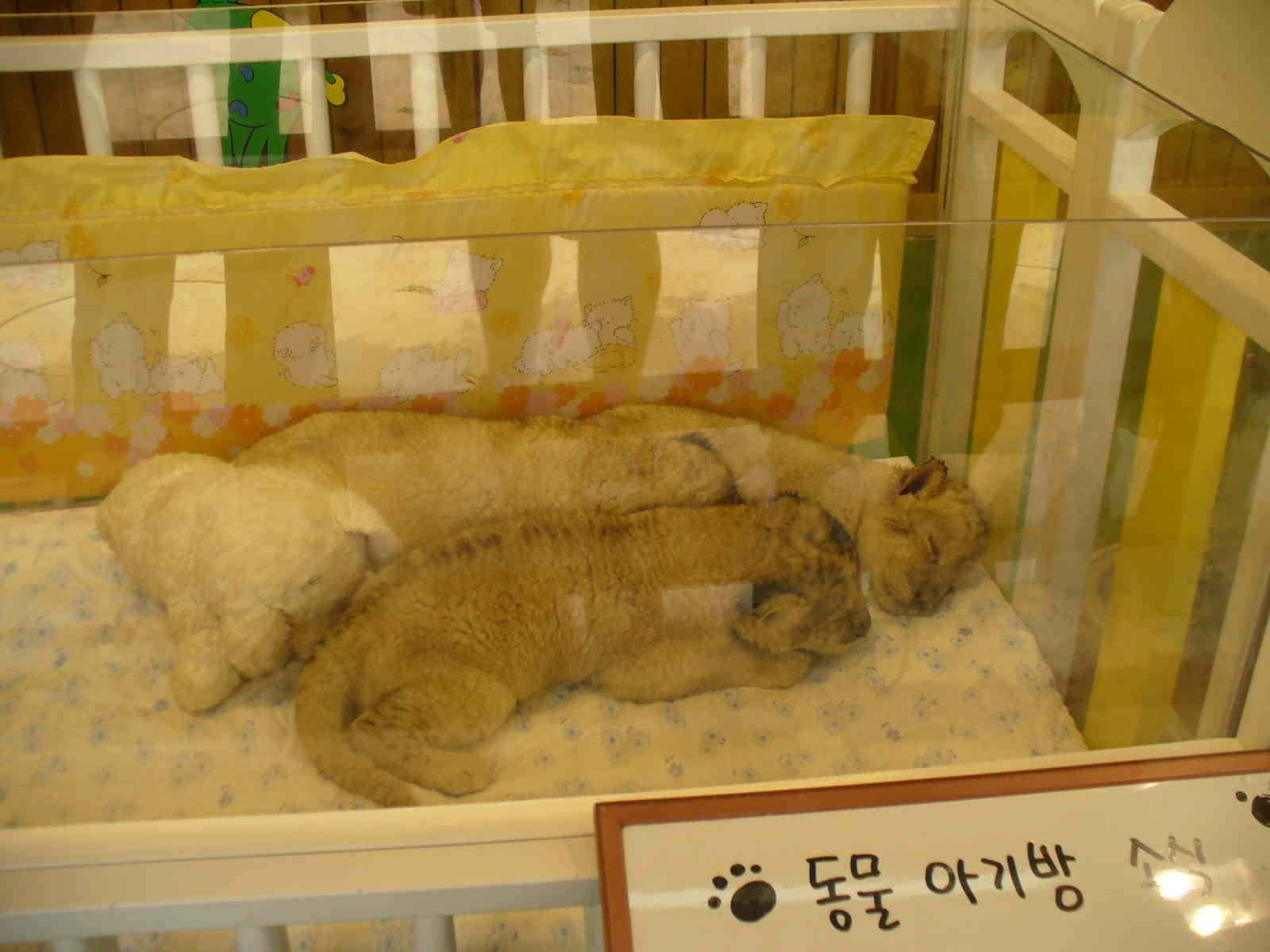
A scene of the animal nursery at the zoo at Everland

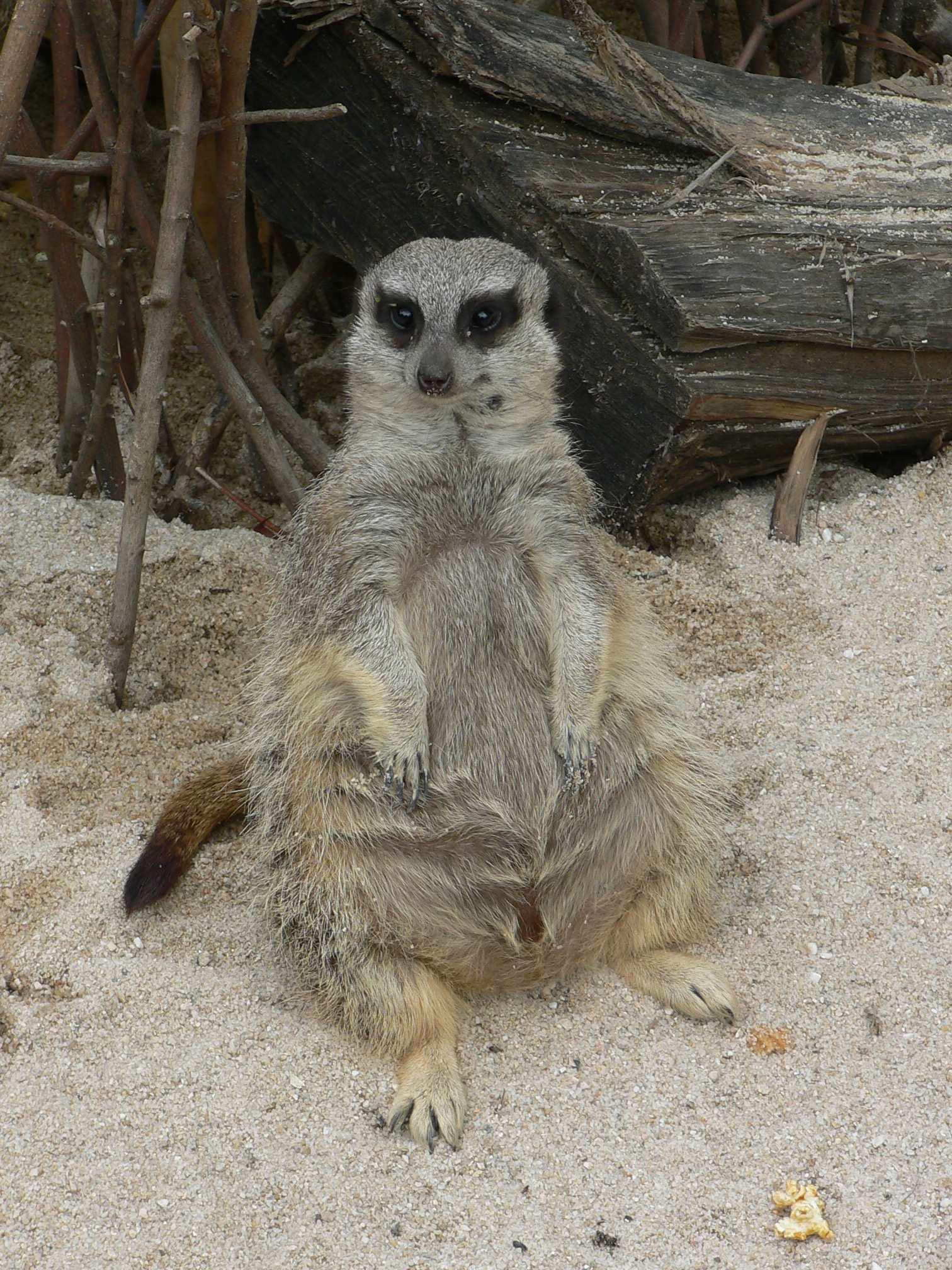
A meerkat at zootopia at Everland

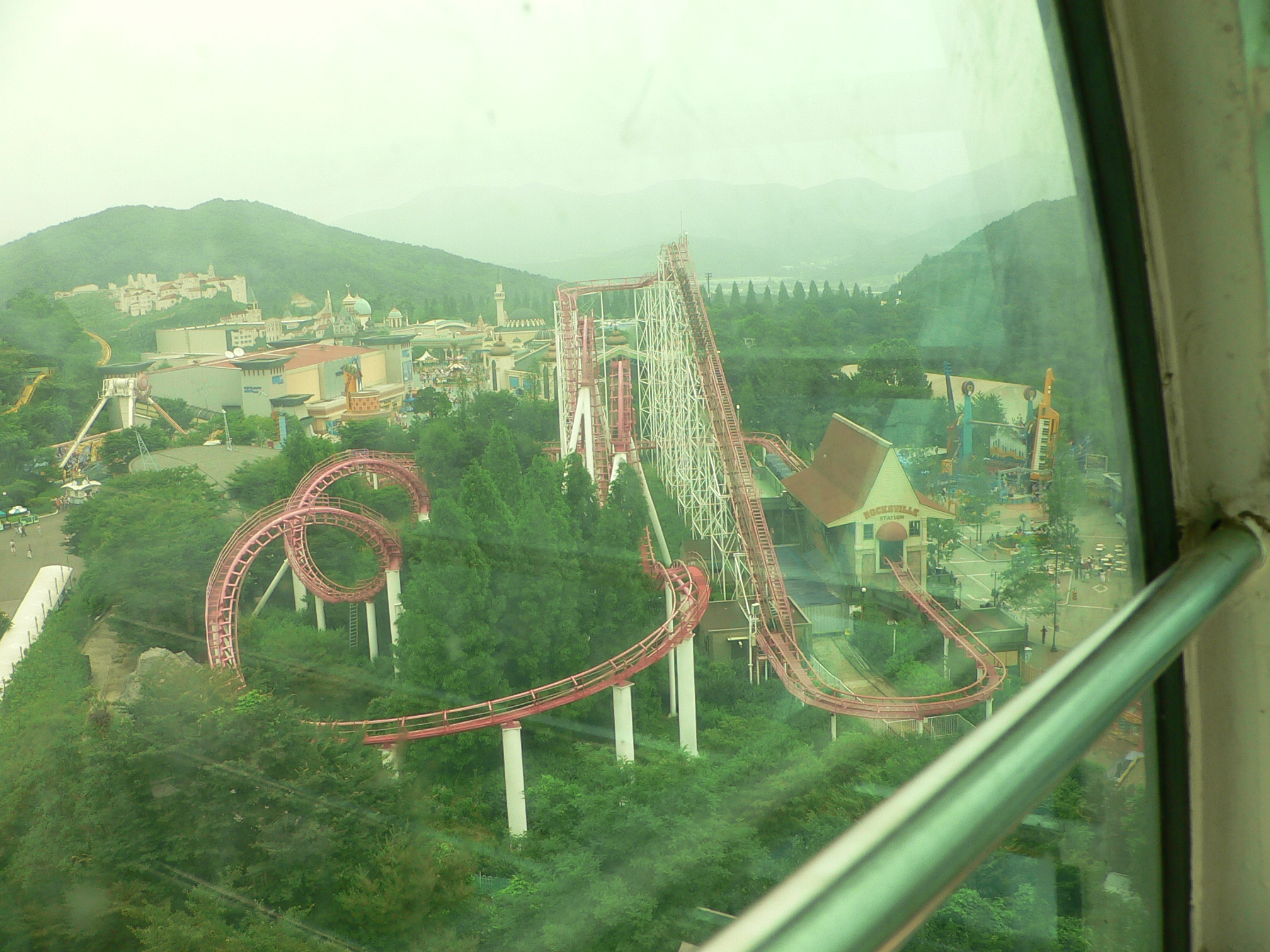

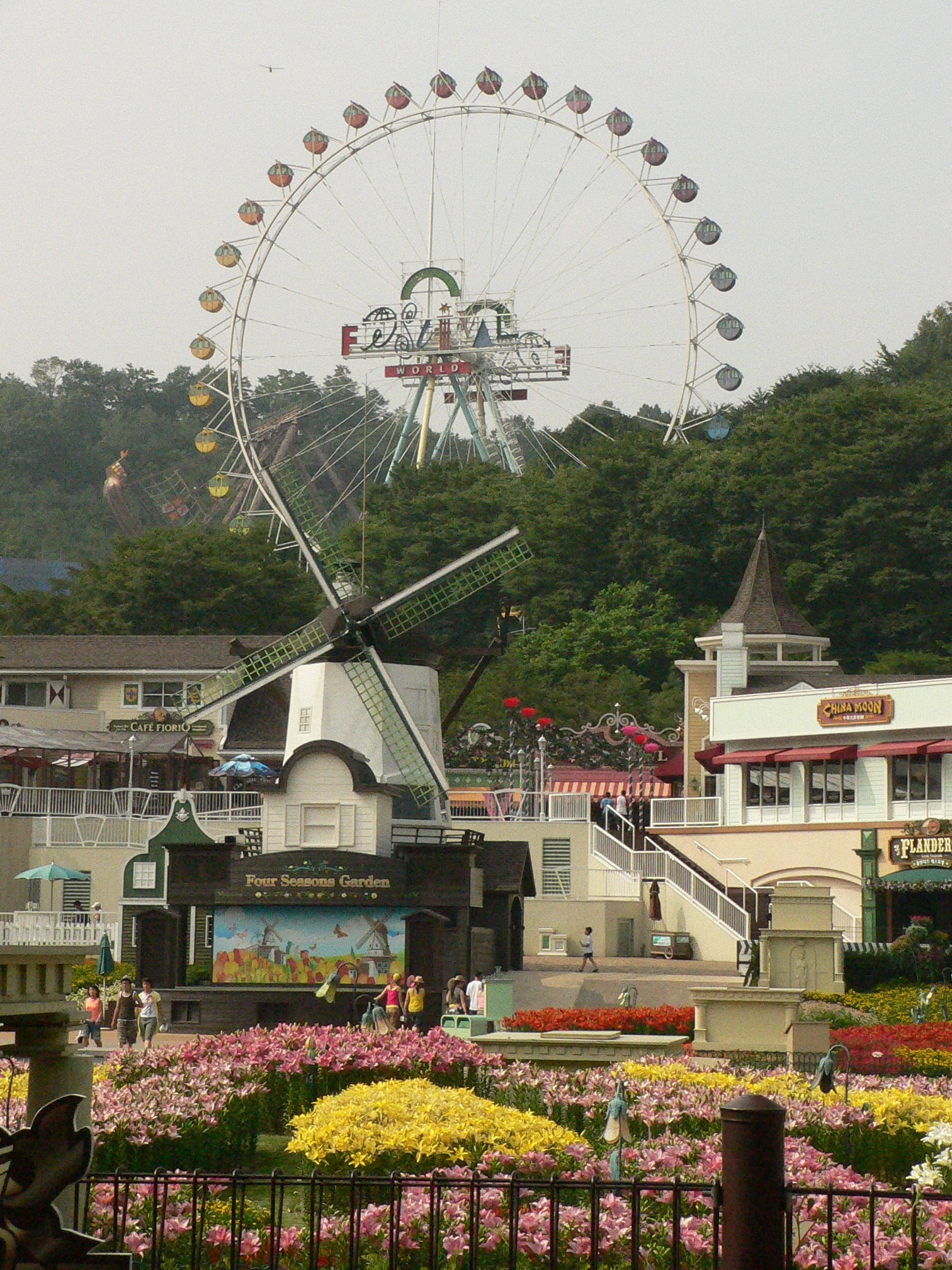

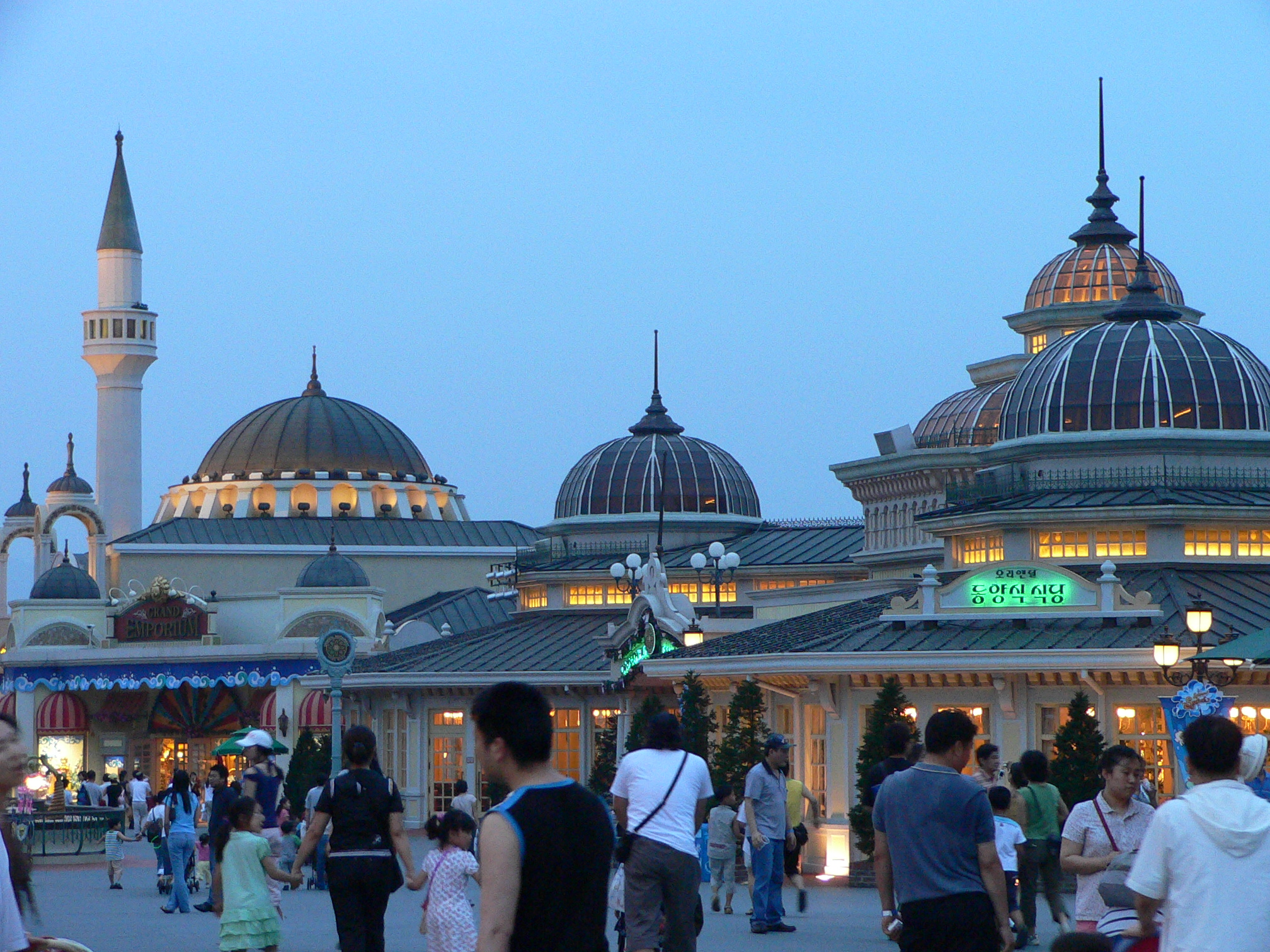
Everland at dusk

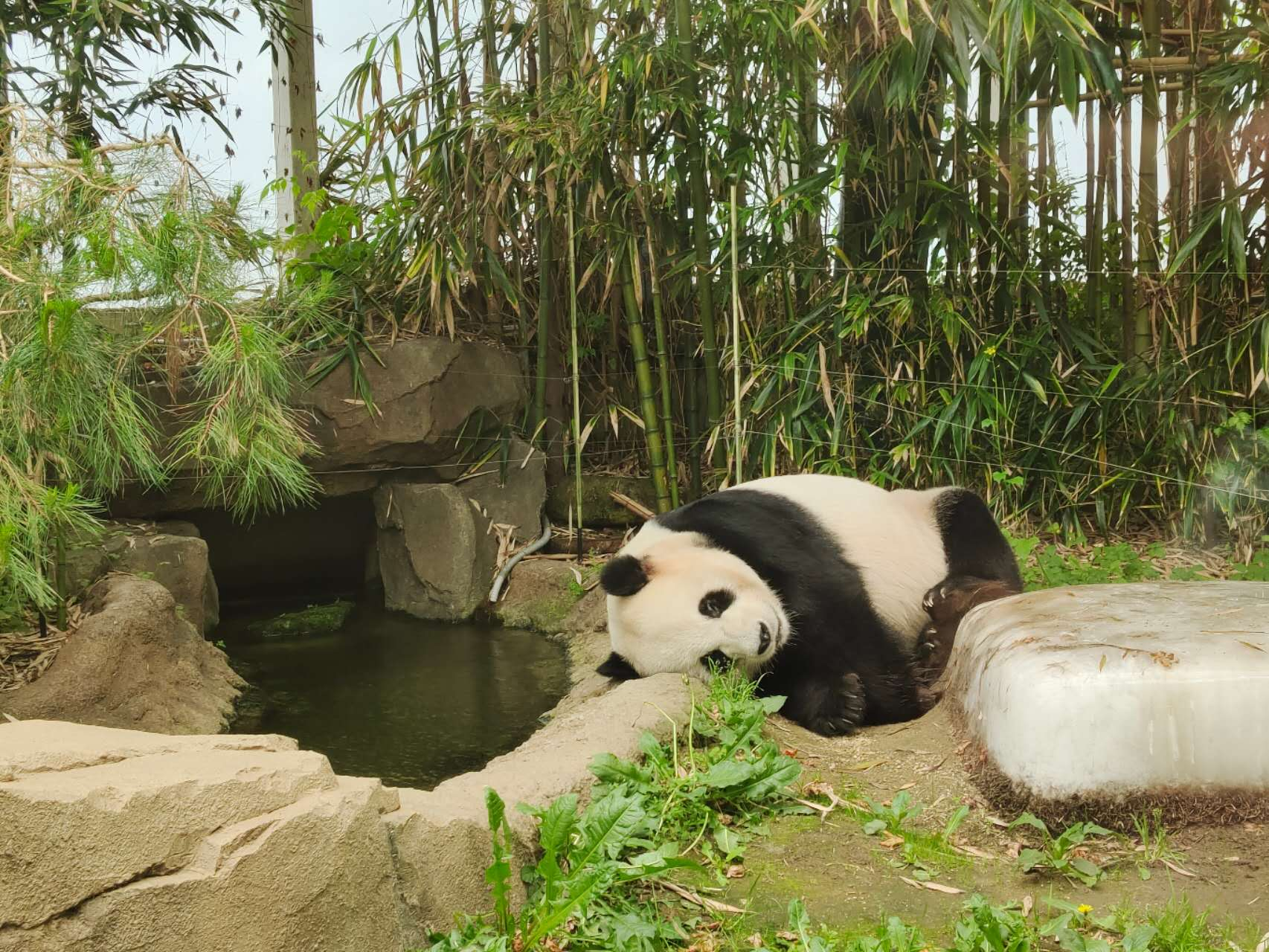
Giant Panda

There are no longer any ligers in Everland

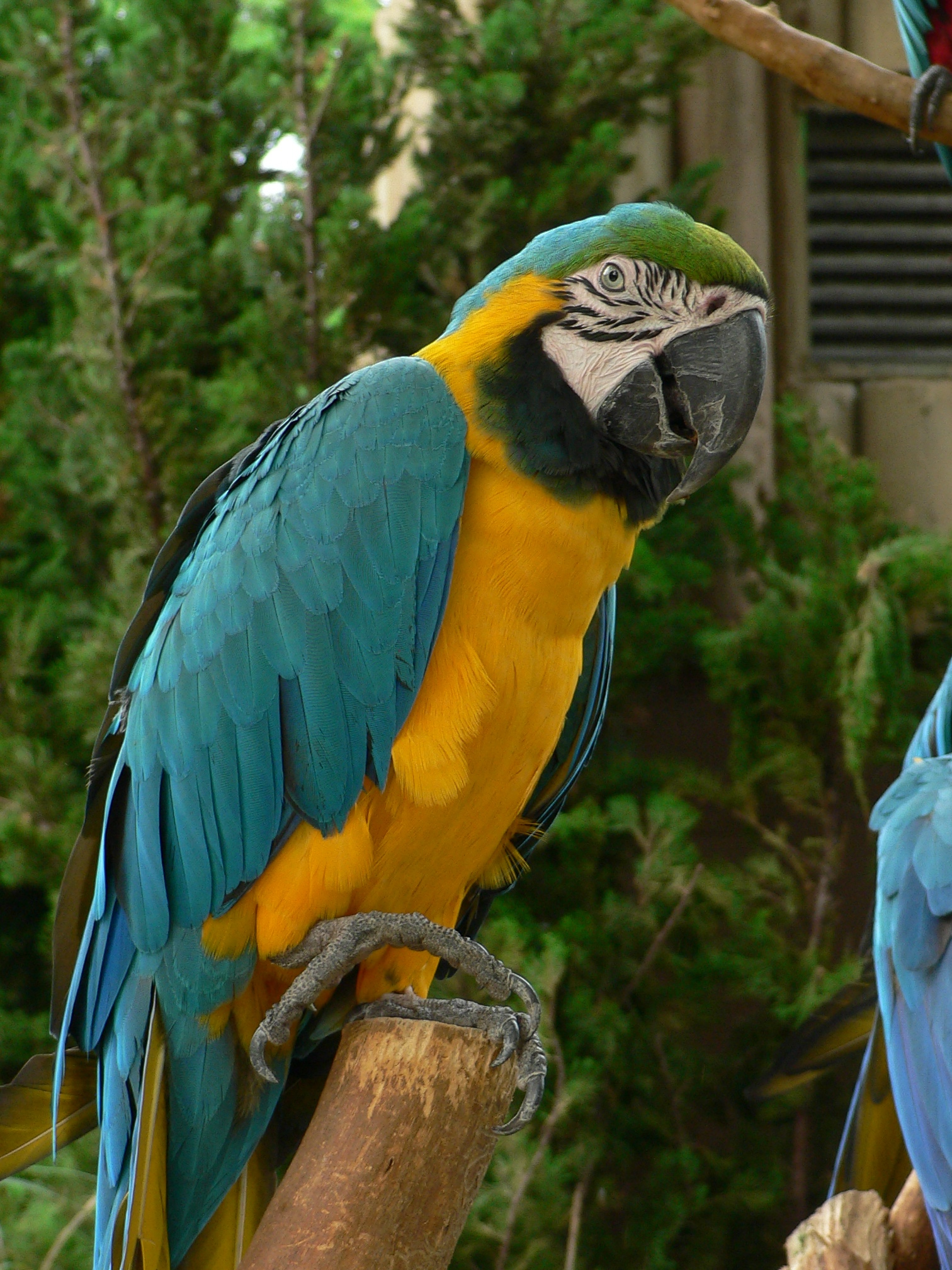
A blue and yellow macaw in Everland

== See also ==
- Lotte World
- Seoul Land
- Children's Grand Park, Seoul
