= Viper (Six Flags Great Adventure) =

Defunct Six Flags roller coaster

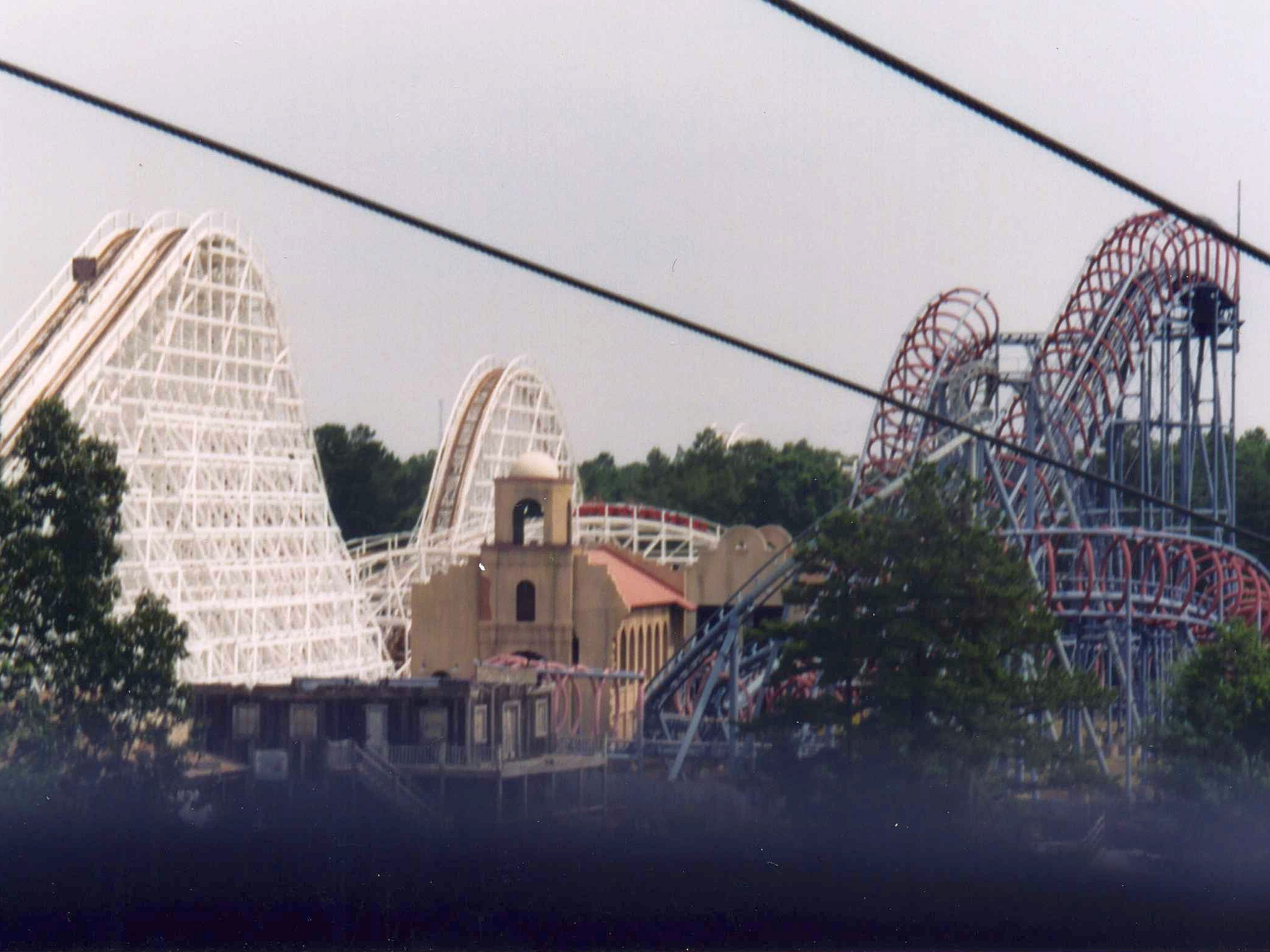
- Viper (on the right) next to Rolling Thunder in 2003

Six Flags Great Adventure
- Location: Six Flags Great Adventure
- Park section: Frontier Adventures
- Coordinates: 40.139°N 74.435°W
- Status: Removed
- Opening date: June 2, 1995
- Closing date: September 6, 2004
- Cost: $4 million
- Replaced: Ultra Twister
- Replaced by: El Toro

General statistics
- Type: Steel
- Manufacturer: TOGO
- Model: Mega Coaster
- Track layout: Twister
- Lift/launch system: Chain lift hill
- Height: 88.6 ft (27.0 m)
- Length: 1,670 ft (510 m)
- Speed: 48 mph (77 km/h)
- Inversions: 2
- Duration: 2:24
- Height restriction: 54 in (137 cm)
- Trains: 3 trains with 4 cars; riders arranged 2 across in 2 rows for a total of 16 riders per train
- Viper at RCDB

Viper was a steel roller coaster located at Six Flags Great Adventure in Jackson Township, New Jersey. Manufactured by TOGO at an estimated cost of $4 million, the ride opened to the public in June 1995. It replaced another steel coaster manufactured by TOGO, Ultra Twister, which was removed in 1989. Viper stood nearly 89 feet (27 m) tall and reached a maximum speed of 48 mph (77 km/h). It featured two inversions, including a heartline roll and a dive loop. Following maintenance issues, extensive downtime, and low ridership due to roughness, Viper was permanently closed after the 2004 season and demolished the following year. The El Toro wooden roller coaster opened in its place in 2006.

== History ==
Following Time Warner's purchase of Six Flags in 1992, the decision was made to enhance theming within the amusement park. A new section called Frontier Adventures was among the changes, which combined the "Best of the West" and "Hernando's Hideaway" areas. Prior to the change, this section of the park previously housed Ultra Twister, the first pipeline roller coaster to open in the United States, which was removed in 1989 and relocated to Six Flags AstroWorld. Ultra Twister's manufacturer, TOGO, built a full-scale prototype of a new coaster model at their testing facility in Ohio. The prototype model introduced a new element that TOGO called the "dive loop", which contained an inline twist maneuver at the top of a half vertical loop. Six Flags Great Adventure bought into the concept and hired TOGO to build one in the former location of Ultra Twister.

Time Warner originally wanted the new ride to be based on the 1992 Clint Eastwood film Unforgiven, but the theme did not perform well during market research. Six Flags ultimately chose the name Viper to pair its snake-like branding with the western-themed Frontiers Adventures. During construction, which began near the end of the 1994 season, officials asked TOGO to install additional steel rings on the lift hill and first drop to enhance its snake-like appearance. Throughout the queue, aged western props and other western-themed elements were added to give it a ghost town appearance. A steel structure left behind from the removal of Ultra Twister was covered with a rustic wood frame and placed near Viper's entrance.

Viper opened to the public on June 2, 1995, and cost an estimated $4 million to construct. Despite a warm reception, it faced maintenance issues and extensive downtime during its operation. Coupled with ride quality issues and gaining a reputation for being extremely rough, guest satisfaction declined.

In 1998, Viper was closed for most of the season, as Six Flags was having difficulty procuring replacement parts needed for maintenance. Behind the scenes, TOGO was struggling financially due to issues regarding Windjammer Surf Racers, which opened at Knott's Berry Farm in 1997. The overall track design was also a factor in many of the ride's issues, with joints along the track unable to properly handle the stress from the trains. Sections of track were rewelded often and sometimes replaced altogether.

After years of increasing complaints of roughness and operating sporadically, Viper would be closed indefinitely in 2001, not operating at all throughout the season. It was subsequently removed from the park's promotional materials and maps. TOGO filed for Chapter 7 bankruptcy that same year and shuttered their American offices. Six Flags considered removing Viper altogether and replacing it with an attraction from another park, but they were unsuccessful finding one that would properly fit its footprint. They pushed forward with modifications to the trains and track, and the coaster reopened to the public on March 29, 2002. The modifications failed to resolve ongoing issues, however, and Viper was down to one operating train by 2004. That season would prove to be its last, and the roller coaster was demolished in June 2005. They kept the station intact and repurposed it for El Toro, a wooden coaster that opened in 2006.

== Ride experience ==
=== Queue ===
Guests passed underneath the entrance sign and entered a western-themed desert. This area featured many props, such as a well, cacti, wagons and more. Along the way, guests walked past a village with shade. Between 1997 and 1998, the site was home to a comedy show called The Legend of Venom Gulch, which would entertain guests while waiting in line. This show utilized the set pieces of the ghost town as backdrop and props for the show with a set of steps from the second floor, where actors could enter and exit the stage area. Guests then approached the station, which resembled an abandoned Spanish church complete with buttressed walls, arched windows and a bell tower. It featured state-of-the-art technology with a special elevator adjacent to the entrance stairs, making the ride handicapped accessible. The placement of the elevator meant guests with disabilities could then wait on the regular queue line. The train shed featured the same exterior as the station. Once guests climbed a set of stairs, they entered the station, which was split into loading and unloading sections. Finally, guests boarded the ride.

In 1999, a portion of the original queue line was taken over by Rodeo Stampede, a Breakdance ride by German manufacturer HUSS. The area was no longer needed as the popularity of Viper had decreased.

=== Layout ===
As the train departed the station, it made a left turn and headed up the 88.6-foot (27.0 m) lift hill. At the top, the train made a left turn, followed by the first drop. After dropping, the train reached a maximum speed of 48 mph (77 km/h) and entered a 65-foot (20 m) dive loop. This is followed by a left turn and a heartline roll inversion. The train then made a left turn into the final brake run before returning to the station.
