= Wicked Cyclone =

Roller coaster at Six Flags New England

- Previously known as Cyclone (1983–2014)
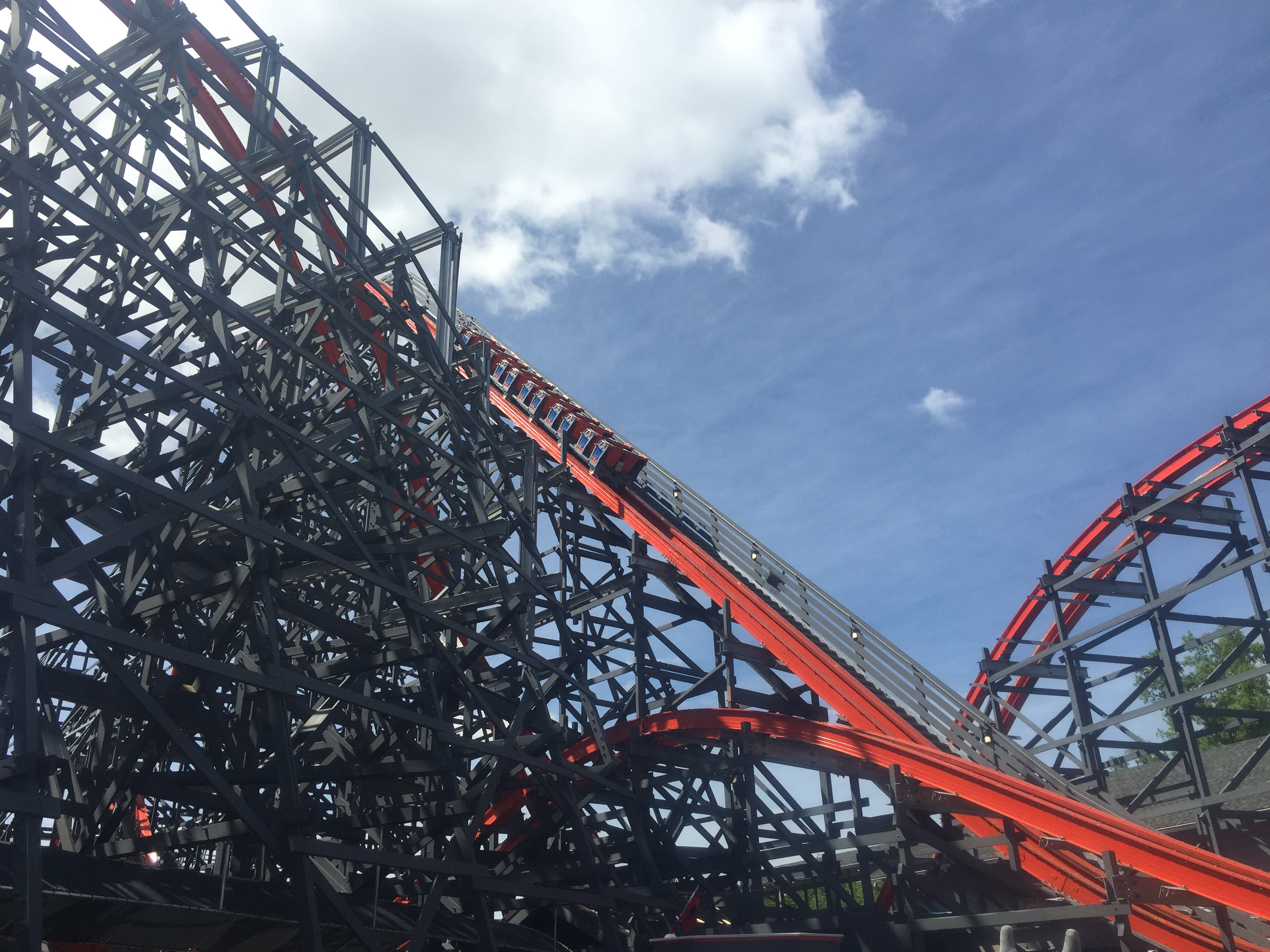

Six Flags New England
- Location: Six Flags New England
- Park section: North End
- Coordinates: 42°2′25″N 72°36′56″W
- Status: Operating
- Opening date: May 24, 2015
- Cost: US$10 million
- Replaced: Cyclone

General statistics
- Type: Steel
- Manufacturer: Rocky Mountain Construction
- Designer: Alan Schilke
- Model: I-Box
- Track layout: Twister
- Lift/launch system: Chain lift hill
- Height: 109 ft (33 m)
- Length: 3,320 ft (1,010 m)
- Speed: 55 mph (89 km/h)
- Inversions: 3
- Max vertical angle: 78°
- Height restriction: 48 in (122 cm)
- Trains: 2 trains with 6 cars. Riders are arranged 2 across in 2 rows for a total of 24 riders per train.
- Fast Lane available
- Wicked Cyclone at RCDB

Wicked Cyclone (formerly Cyclone) is a hybrid roller coaster built by American manufacturer Rocky Mountain Construction located at the Six Flags New England amusement park in Agawam, Massachusetts. The ride originally opened as a wooden roller coaster named Cyclone on June 24, 1983. Its name and design were inspired by the 1927 Coney Island Cyclone in Brooklyn, New York. In 2014, Cyclone was closed and converted into a steel roller coaster, reopening as Wicked Cyclone on May 24, 2015.

== History ==
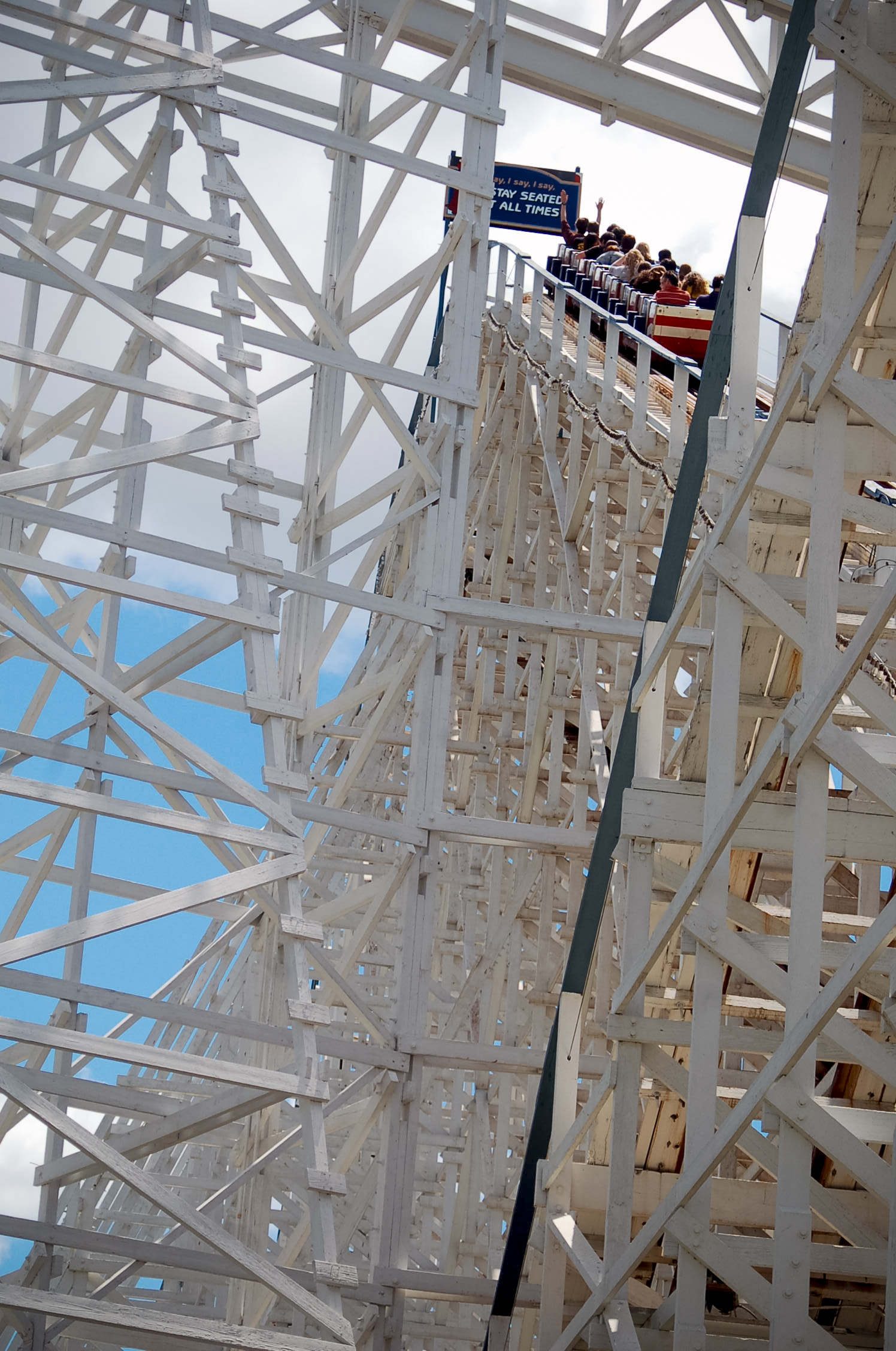
The original incline in 2008.

=== Original Cyclone ===
In 1983, Riverside Amusement Park decided to open a wooden roller coaster named the Riverside Cyclone. The ride was the second full-sized roller coaster to open at the park since its re-opening in 1940, following the installation of Thunderbolt in 1941. The $2.5 million Riverside Cyclone was designed by William Cobb & Associates and built by the Frontier Construction Company. The ride officially opened to the public on June 25, 1983, with Cobb as well as Norm Howells from Frontier Construction in attendance. The opening of Riverside Cyclone was expected to increase park attendance by more than 10% to 1 million annual visitors.

During its first season of operation, Riverside Cyclone featured two trains from Philadelphia Toboggan Coasters (PTC) where riders were restrained via a lap bar. Part-way through the first season, shoulder belts were added; however, these were removed prior to its second season. During its second season, the ride's trains were damaged, forcing the park to combine parts from both trains to form a single operational train. Two new replacement trains were purchased from D. H. Morgan Manufacturing in 1985.

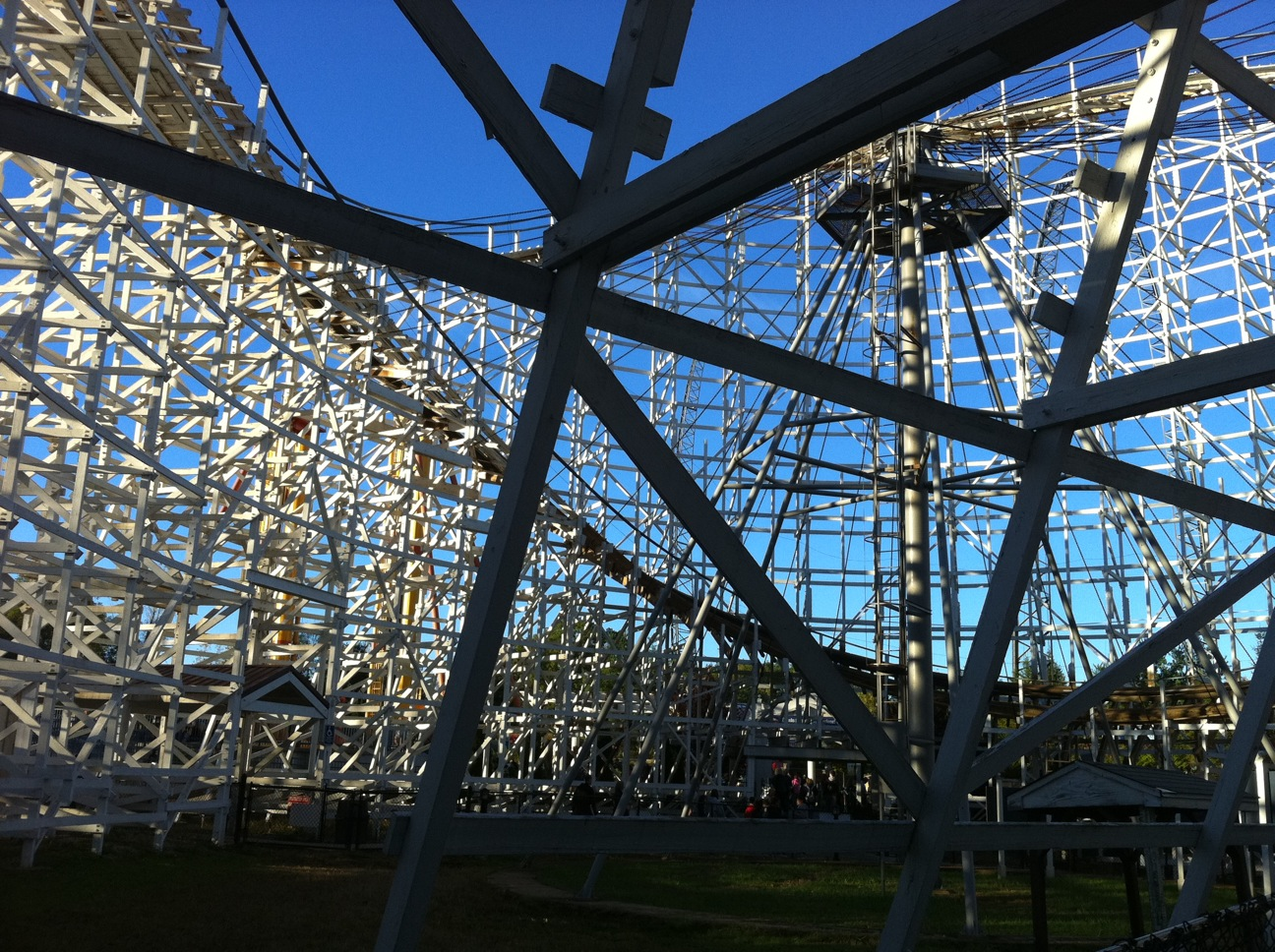
A view of the original Cyclone from inside its footprint

In the late 1990s, Premier Parks (later Six Flags) purchased Riverside Amusement Park. Over a period of four years, approximately $100 million was invested in the renovation and expansion of the park, culminating in its rebranding to Six Flags New England in 2000. As a result, the Riverside branding was dropped, with the ride being renamed to the Cyclone. The D.H. Morgan Manufacturing trains were replaced with two PTC trains. The new operators made modifications to the track in 2001, shortening the first drop by between 15 and 20 feet (4.6 and 6.1 m).

A refurbishment of the Cyclone in 2011 saw Topper Track from Rocky Mountain Construction added to sections of the ride. Topper Track is steel plating that replaces the upper layers of laminated wooden track. This track style is designed to reduce the maintenance typically required for a wooden roller coaster and provide a smoother ride experience.

=== Conversion to steel track ===
Over the years, the popularity of Cyclone began to decline. In June 2014, Six Flags New England announced that the ride would close permanently on July 20, 2014. A closing ceremony and farewell celebration was held on its last day of operation. Enthusiasts, including members of American Coaster Enthusiasts, were onboard for the media shoot, as John Winkler and the mayor of Agawam hosted a small ceremony to cut the cake. Fireworks were set off that night during the last ride, with wait times to ride reaching 90 minutes long. After the last rides were given, Six Flags showcased a future announcement scheduled in August using construction signs and a sandwich board near Cyclone's entrance. During its 31 seasons in operation as a wooden coaster, Cyclone was ridden by more than 15 million riders. The decision to close the ride was made over a period of one and half years.

On August 28, 2014, it was announced that Cyclone would undergo a transformation into Wicked Cyclone, converting its wooden track to steel. Manufactured by Rocky Mountain Construction and designed by Alan Schilke, it features a 10-story drop, a maximum speed of 55 mph (89 km/h), and the world's first "double-reversing bank airtime hill" element. Dubbed a hybrid coaster, it is the first hybrid on the East Coast, and the only one to feature a 200-degree stall and two Zero G Rolls. The ride reopened as Wicked Cyclone in May 2015.

== Characteristics ==
Statistic	Cyclone	Wicked Cyclone
Years	1983–2014	2015–
Manufacturer	Frontier Construction Company	Rocky Mountain Construction
Designer	William Cobb & Associates	Alan Schilke
Track	Wood	Steel
Height	112 ft or 34 m	109 ft or 33 m
Length	3,600 ft or 1,100 m	3,320 ft or 1,010 m
Speed	45 mph or 72 km/h	55 mph or 89 km/h
Max vertical angle	54°	78°
Trains	Philadelphia Toboggan Coasters (PTC)	Rocky Mountain Construction

== Reception ==
Golden Ticket Awards: Best New Ride for 2015
Ranking	2

Golden Ticket Awards: Top steel Roller Coasters
Year									1998	1999
Ranking									–	–
Year	2000	2001	2002	2003	2004	2005	2006	2007	2008	2009
Ranking	–	–	–	–	–	–	–	–	–	–
Year	2010	2011	2012	2013	2014	2015	2016	2017	2018	2019
Ranking	–	–	–	–	–	23	18	14 (tie)	33	39
Year	2020	2021	2022	2023	2024	2025				
Ranking	N/A	42 (tie)	45	–	–	–				
