= DC Universe (themed area) =

DC Comics themed land at Six Flags parks

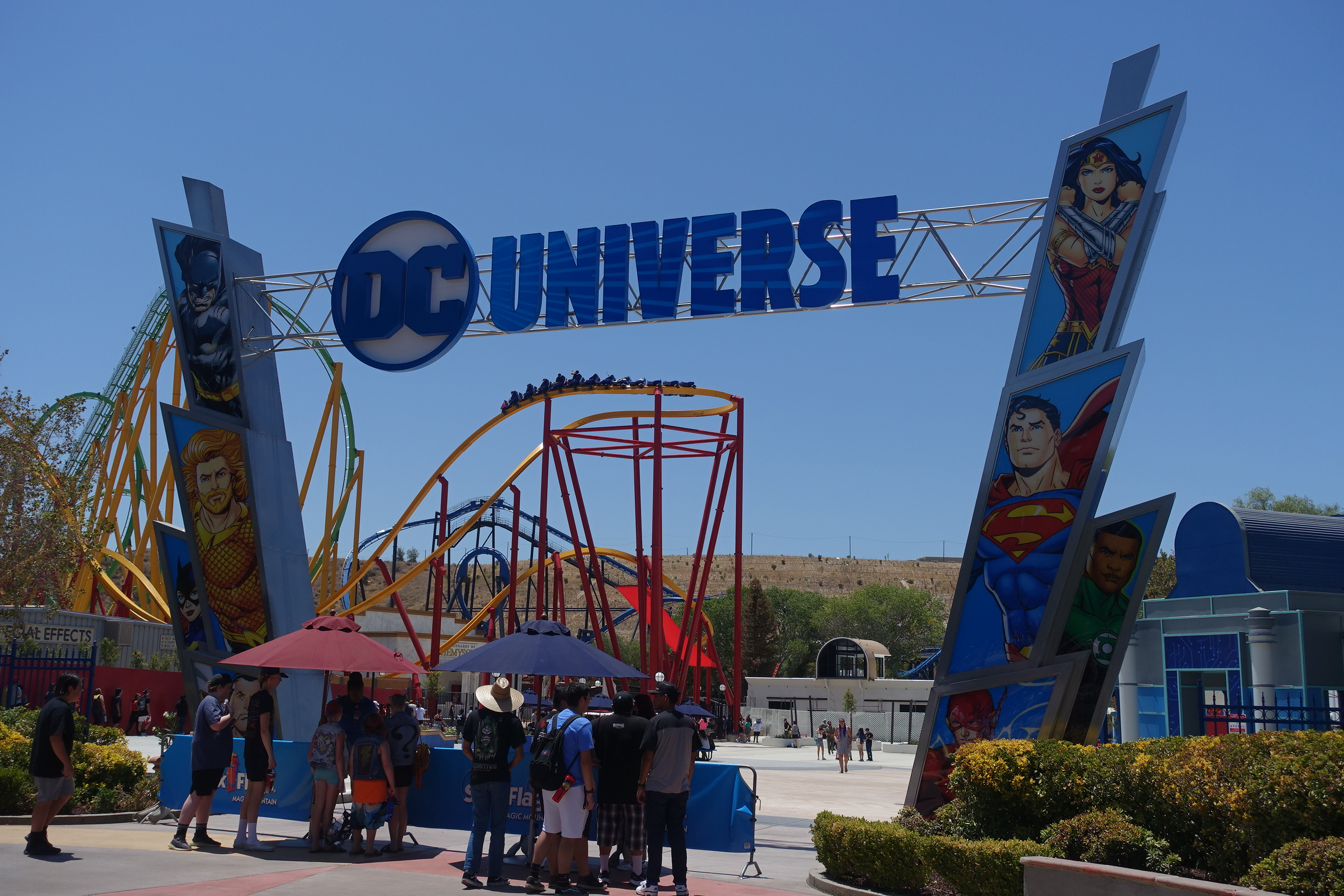
- The entrance portal to DC Universe, seen at Six Flags Magic Mountain
- Theme: DC Comics

DC Universe (stylized DC UNIVERSE) is a DC Comics themed area at several Six Flags amusement parks. First opening at Six Flags Magic Mountain in 2011, the themed area has since expanded into multiple Six Flags amusement parks in North America. Although the layout and attractions are not identical and vary at each park, they all thematically connect with each other.

Shared attractions located within the themed area include Batman: The Ride, an inverted roller coaster at Six Flags Great America and Six Flags Magic Mountain and DC Super-Villains Swing, a swing ride at Six Flags Fiesta Texas and Six Flags Great America.

== History ==
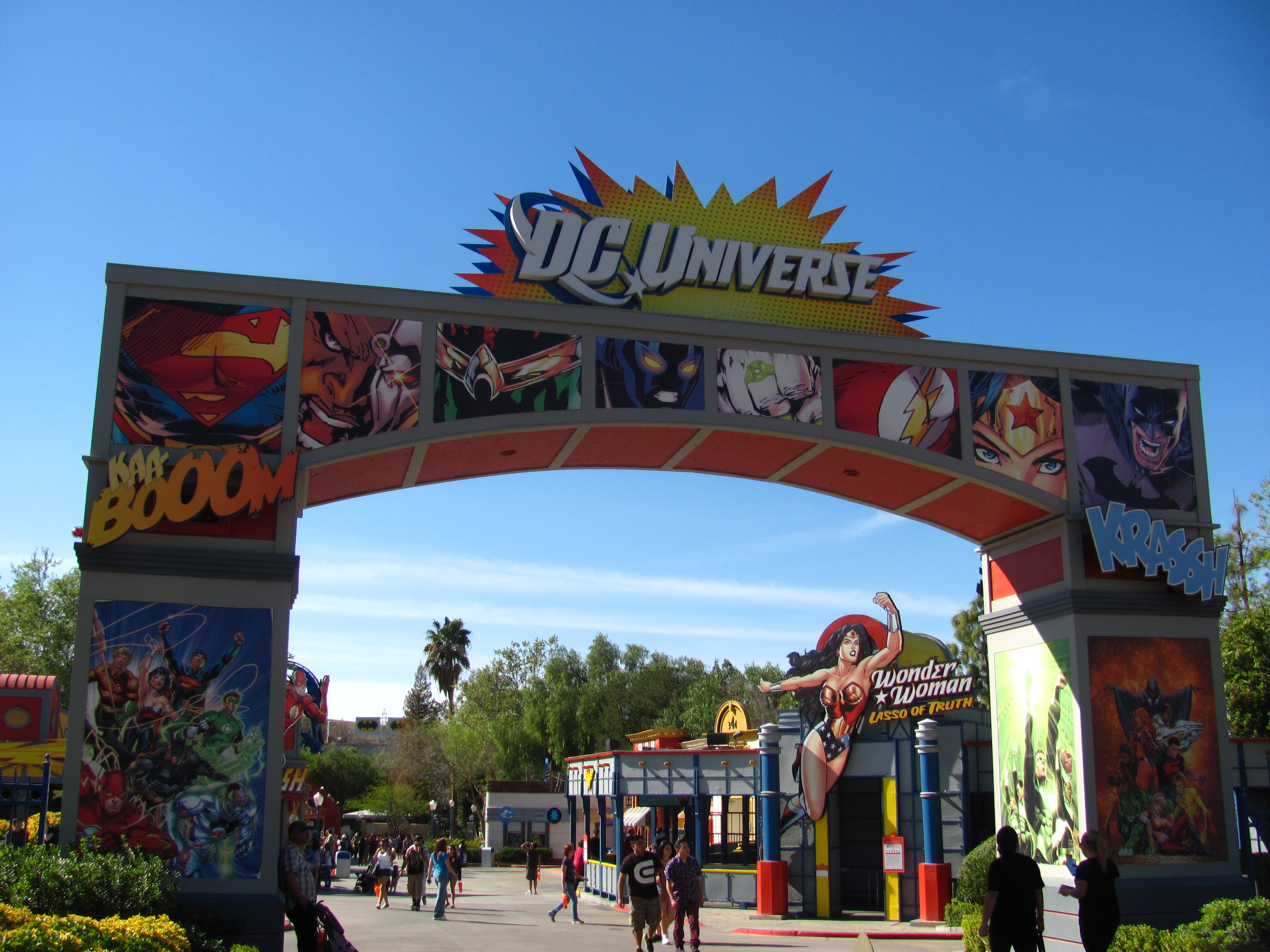
The entrance to DC Universe at Six Flags Magic Mountain in 2014, before its overhaul in 2022.

A new attraction at Six Flags Magic Mountain was announced on October 20, 2010, when Green Lantern: First Flight was revealed to the public. The attraction would be placed within a new themed area replacing Gotham City Backlot, a themed area based on the fictional city Gotham City. The themed area would be a major change from the former Gotham City Backlot, and an editor for Theme Park Tourist noted that it switched themes from "dark and gritty" to a "typical comic-style punch of color."

The next DC Universe wouldn't come until more than half a decade later, in 2018, which would be at Six Flags México. When Wonder Woman Coaster opened, it caused the partial re-theme of the Villa Hollywood area, with the re-theme of two rides within the park, with SkyScreamer becoming Supergirl Sky Flight and Splash becoming Aquaman Splashdown, joining existing DC Comics themed rides Batman: The Ride and Justice League: Battle for Metropolis.

The third DC Universe themed area would come with the introduction of Batman: The Ride was introduced at Six Flags Discovery Kingdom. With the announcement for Batman: The Ride on August 30, 2018, the themed area was not announced until later the following year, in March 2019. Major changes to the area would include the re-theme of multiple rides and shops, including V2: Vertical Velocity, which, with the theme change, would become The Flash: Vertical Velocity. These changes would fit in with other rides already themed to DC Comics, such as The Joker, Harley Quinn Crazy Coaster and Superman: Ultimate Flight.

Another DC Universe themed area also opened in 2019, at Six Flags Fiesta Texas. This area would comprise both the Rockville and Spassburg areas within the park, and is still connected to the remaining parts of those two areas. The area was also introduced on August 30, 2018, and was officially announced along with The Joker Wild Card (later renamed The Joker Carnival of Chaos), a pendulum ride themed to super-villain the Joker. Other changes to the area would include the re-theme of Whirligig, which would be renamed Crime Wave, but plans never came through and the ride instead became DC Super-Villains Swing. DC Universe being separate from Rockville and Spassburg would be unclear though, as there is no delineation between the areas.

Six Flags New England would announce a Zamperla Endeavour attraction on August 29, 2019, with Supergirl Sky Flyer. The attraction, which is based on the super-hero Supergirl, would be a part of DC Universe, which replaced DC Comics Super Hero Adventures. The opening of both the attraction and the themed area was delayed until 2021, due to the effects of the COVID-19 pandemic.

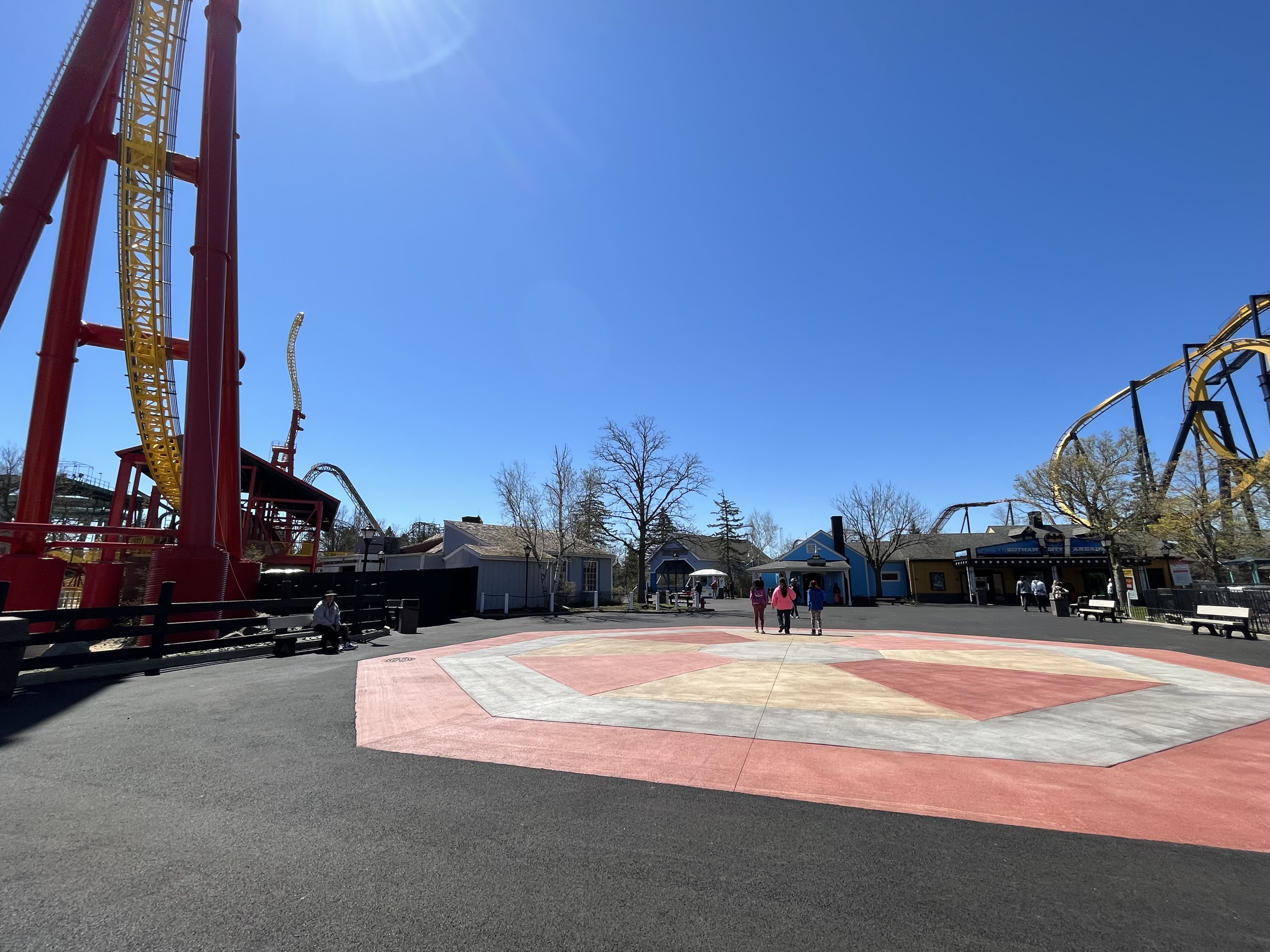
The plaza section of DC Universe at Six Flags Great America on April 23, 2022.

At Six Flags Great America, after multiple teasers about the re-theme about the park's impulse roller coaster, Vertical Velocity, The Flash: Vertical Velocity and DC Universe was officially announced to the public on March 24, 2022, overhauling the Yankee Harbor section of the park, an original themed area which opened with the park in 1976. Besides the re-theme of Vertical Velocity, the newly themed area would feature re-themed versions of original rides, including DC Super-Villains Swing and Aquaman Splashdown. These attractions would join already-existing DC Comics themed rides, including Batman: The Ride and The Joker. DC Universe was planned to open on April 15, 2022, but due to supply chain issues and excessive rain, the area opened on April 23, 2022.

On April 28, 2022, in honor of National Superhero Day, Six Flags Magic Mountain announced their plans to renovate their DC Universe, due to the addition of Wonder Woman Flight of Courage, which was announced on October 21, 2021. The themed area would receive a new entrance portal sign and the re-theme of the flat ride Wonder Woman Lasso of Truth, in which it would become Teen Titans Turbo Spin.

Fiesta Texas announced for the 2024 season, the park will expand its DC Universe into more parts of Spassburg and Thrillseeker Park. The new expansion of the land brought in more themed rides and three new attractions.

== Locations ==
Location	First season	Notes
Six Flags Magic Mountain	2011	Replaced the Gotham City Backlot area
Six Flags México	2018	Replaced parts of Villa Hollywood area
Six Flags Discovery Kingdom	2019	Replaced parts of the Sky area
Six Flags Fiesta Texas	2019	Replaced parts of the Spassburg area
Six Flags New England	2021	Replaced the DC Comics Super Hero Adventures area
Six Flags Great America	2022	Replaced the Yankee Harbor area

== Attractions ==
=== Flat rides and roller coasters ===
Attraction name	Ride type	Manufacturer	Locations (Note: Locations will only include attractions located within DC Universe, and will not include other locations if the same attraction is located at a different park under a different themed area.)	Ref.
Aquaman Splashdown	Hydroflume	Arrow Dynamics	Great America	
Batgirl Coaster Chase	Junior roller coaster	Vekoma	Fiesta Texas	
Batman: The Ride	Inverted roller coaster	Bolliger & Mabillard	Magic Mountain, Great America	
Batman: The Ride	Fourth-dimension roller coaster	S&S – Sansei Technologies	Discovery Kingdom	
Batman: The Ride	Suspended Looping Coaster	Vekoma	México	
Catwoman's Whip	Tivoli - Large	Zierer	New England	
Cyborg Cyber Revolution	NebulaZ	Zamperla	Fiesta Texas	
Cyborg: Hyper Drive	Free Style	Chance Rides	New England	
DC Super-Villains Swing	Swing ride	Zamperla	Fiesta Texas, Great America	
Gotham City Gauntlet	Wild mouse roller coaster	Maurer AG	New England	
Green Lantern Emerald Flight	Aero Top Jet	Zamperla	Fiesta Texas	
Justice League: Battle for Metropolis	Dark ride	Sally Corporation	México	
Lex Luthor: Drop of Doom	Drop Tower	Intamin	Magic Mountain	
Metropolis Transit Authority	Aerial Ride (monorail)	Zamperla	Fiesta Texas	
Poison Ivy Toxic Spin	Samba Tower	Zamperla	Fiesta Texas	
The Flash: Vertical Velocity	Impulse roller coaster	Intamin	Great America	
The Flash: Vertical Velocity	Impulse roller coaster	Intamin	Discovery Kingdom	
Wonder Woman Flight of Courage	Single-rail roller coaster	Rocky Mountain Construction	Magic Mountain	
The Joker	Fourth-dimension roller coaster	S&S – Sansei Technologies	Great America	
The Joker	Hybrid roller coaster	Rocky Mountain Construction	Discovery Kingdom	
The Joker Carnival of Chaos	Pendulum ride	Zamperla	Fiesta Texas	
Teen Titans Turbo Spin	Round Up	Hrubetz	Magic Mountain	
Superman: Ultimate Flight	Sky Rocket II	Premier Rides	Discovery Kingdom	
Superman: Krypton Coaster	Floorless coaster	Bolliger & Mabillard	Fiesta Texas	
Superman The Ride	Mega Coaster	Intamin	New England	
The Penguin	Teacups	Mack Rides	Discovery Kingdom	
The Penguin: Gotham City Getaway	Convoy Ride	Zamperla	Fiesta Texas	
Shazam! Tower of Eternity	Sky Tower	Zamperla	Fiesta Texas	
Supergirl Sky Flyer	Endeavour	Zamperla	New England	
Supergirl Sky Flight	Star Flyer	Funtime	Fiesta Texas, México	

=== Restaurants ===
Restaurant name	Location	Ref.
Steelworks Pub (Note: The same restaurant can be found at Six Flags America as well, but the restaurant is not located in a DC Universe area, and is instead located in a Gotham City area.)	Great America	
Big Belly Burger	Discovery Kingdom	
Captain Cold Ice Cream	Great America	
Johnny Rockets	New England, Fiesta Texas	
Central City Snacks	Great America	
Aztek the Ultimate Nachos	Fiesta Texas	
Gotham City Snacks	Discovery Kingdom, Great America	
Dippin' Dots booths	Great America	

=== Shops ===
Shop name	Locations	Ref.
Justice League: Battle for Metropolis Shop	México (part of Villa Hollywood)	
DC Super Heroes Store	New England	
Comics Shop	México (part of Villa Hollywood)	
DC Universe Store	Magic Mountain, Great America	
Daily Planet Gifts	Discovery Kingdom	
The Daily Planet Gift Shop	New England	
Daily Planet Newsstand & Gifts	Fiesta Texas	

== See also ==
- Media related to DC Universe at Wikimedia Commons
- DC Comics Super Hero Adventures, defunct themed lands at the abandoned Six Flags New Orleans and Six Flags New England
- Gotham City (themed area), themed lands at various parks around the world
