= Gotham City (themed area) =

Themed land at various amusement parks

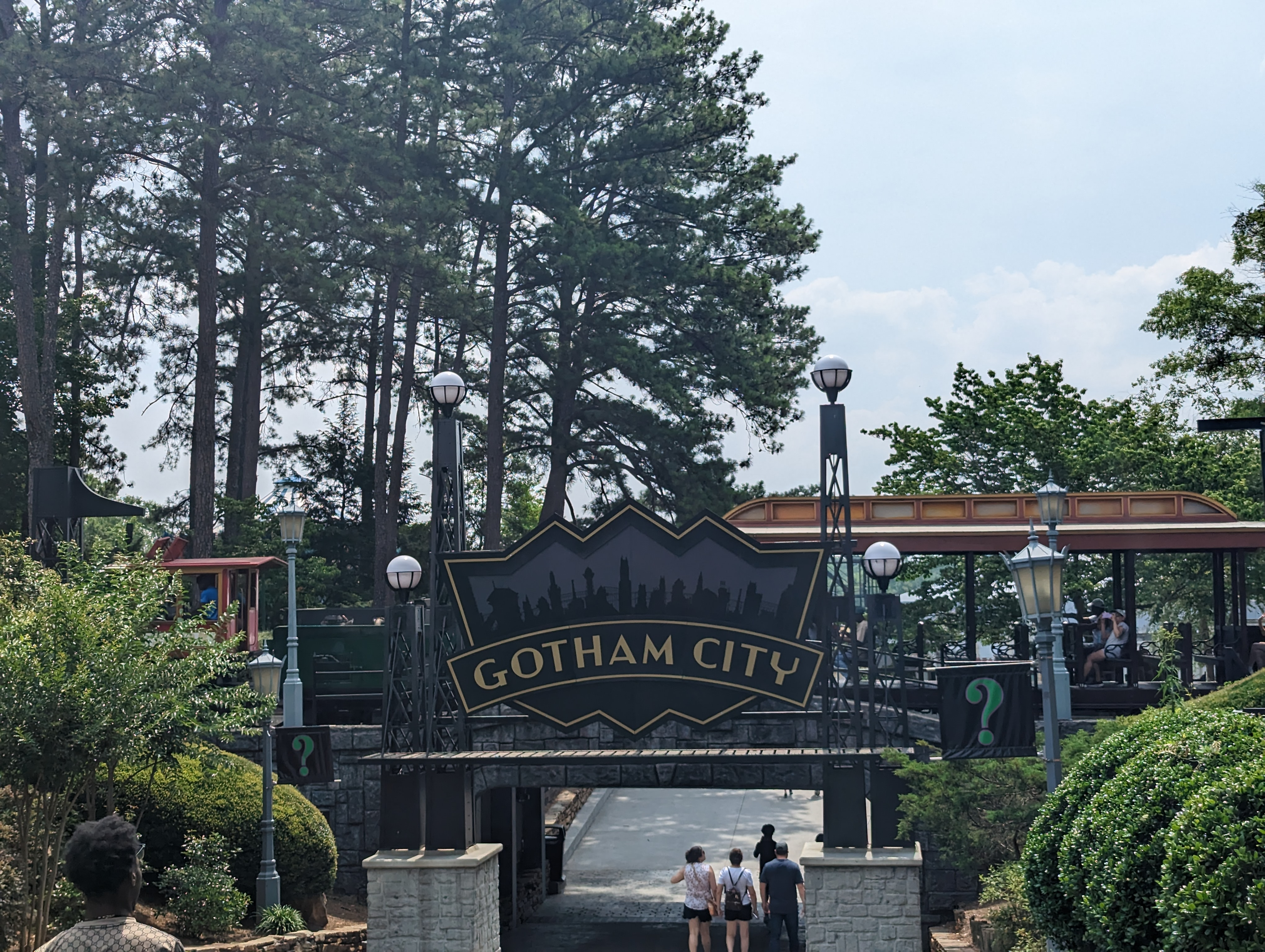
- Gotham City's sign at Six Flags Over Georgia
- Opened: 1994
- Theme: Gotham City

Gotham City is a themed area based on Gotham City at several amusement parks around the world. First opening at Six Flags Magic Mountain in 1994, the themed area has since expanded into multiple Six Flags amusement parks and Warner Bros. World Abu Dhabi. Although the layout and attractions are not identical and vary at each park, they all thematically connect with each other.

== Locations ==
Locations with a Gotham City themed area
Location	First season	Last season	Notes
Six Flags Over Georgia	1997		Replaced the Jolly Roger's Island area
Six Flags America	1999	2025	The park permanently closed on November 2, 2025.
Six Flags Over Texas	1999		
Six Flags New England	2018		Replaced the South End area
Warner Bros. World Abu Dhabi	2018		
Six Flags Worlds of Adventure	2000	2003	Replaced by the Power City area, after Six Flags sold the park
Warner Bros. Movie World Germany	1997	2004	Replaced by the Streets of New York area
Six Flags Magic Mountain	1994	2010	Replaced by the DC Universe area. Operated as Gotham City Backlot

=== Warner Bros. World Abu Dhabi ===
During the grand opening ceremony on 26 July 2018, the park was inaugurated by Vice President and Prime Minister of the UAE and Ruler of Dubai His Highness Sheikh Mohammed bin Rashid Al Maktoum, and Crown Prince of Abu Dhabi and Deputy Supreme Commander of the UAE Armed Forces His Highness Sheikh Mohammed bin Zayed Al Nahyan in the Warner Bros. Plaza.

== Attractions ==
- Rides listed are current attractions currently in a Gotham City themed area

=== Flat rides and roller coasters ===
Attraction name	Ride type	Manufacturer	Locations (Note: Locations will only include attractions located within Gotham City, and will not include other locations if the same attraction is located at a different park under a different themed area.)	Ref.
Batman: Knight Flight			Warner Bros. World Abu Dhabi	
Batman: The Dark Knight	Floorless Coaster	Bolliger & Mabillard	Six Flags New England	
Batman: The Ride	Inverted roller coaster	Bolliger & Mabillard	Six Flags Over Georgia	
Batman: The Ride	Inverted roller coaster	Bolliger & Mabillard	Six Flags Over Texas	
Batwing	Telecombat	Zamperla	Six Flags Over Texas	
Catwoman Whip	Endeavour	Zamperla	Six Flags Over Georgia	
Catwoman Whip	Endeavour	Zamperla	Six Flags Over Texas	
DC Super Villains Swing	Swing ride	Zierer	Six Flags Over Georgia	
Gotham City Crime Wave	Swing ride	Zierer	Six Flags New England	
Harley Quinn Spinsanity	Pendulum ride	Zamperla	Six Flags New England	
Harley Quinn: Wild Whirl	Tilt-A-Whirl	Larson International	Six Flags Over Georgia	
Mr. Freeze	Launched roller coaster	Premier Rides	Six Flags Over Texas	
Poison Ivy: Toxic Spin	Scrambler	Eli Bridge	Six Flags Over Georgia	
Scarecrow Scare Raid			Warner Bros. World Abu Dhabi	
The Joker	Fourth-dimension roller coaster	S&S – Sansei Technologies	Six Flags New England	
The Joker	Fourth-dimension roller coaster	S&S – Sansei Technologies	Six Flags Over Texas	
The Joker Funhouse			Warner Bros. World Abu Dhabi	
The Riddler Mindbender	Steel looping roller coaster	Schwarzkopf	Six Flags Over Georgia	
The Riddler Revenge	Suspended Looping Coaster	Vekoma	Six Flags New England	
The Riddler Revenge	Pendulum ride	Zamperla	Six Flags Over Texas	
The Riddler Revolution			Warner Bros. World Abu Dhabi	

== See also ==
- DC Comics Super Hero Adventures, defunct themed lands at the abandoned Six Flags New Orleans and Six Flags New England
- DC Universe, themed lands at various Six Flags parks
