= William Cobb (designer) =

American designer and engineer of roller coasters

William L. Cobb
- Born: 1917; Talbotton, Georgia, U.S.
- Died: December 17, 1990 (aged 72–73); Dutch Island, Georgia, U.S.
- Occupation: Roller coaster designer
- Known for: William Cobb & Associates

William L. Cobb (1917 – December 17, 1990) was an American designer and engineer of roller coasters, as the founder and head of William Cobb & Associates. He is particularly noted for his work on designing and relocating several major wooden roller coasters in the 1970s and 1980s. A number of these coasters were world-record holders at the time of their opening.

On the subject of roller coaster design, Cobb has been quoted as saying, "You have to be a little bit mean. Sometimes you have to be a little bit sneaky. You get them going on a nice straight track and they think 'This looks smooth,' and then you dip it down a little to give them a good jolt. Or you have it so that when they go over a hill it looks like they're going to get their heads chopped off at the bottom."

== List of roller coasters ==
William Cobb designed 11 roller coasters around the world.

Name	Model	Park	Country	Opened	Status	Ref
Great American Scream Machine	Wood support structure	Six Flags Over Georgia	United States	1973	Operating	
Screamin' Eagle	Wood support structure	Six Flags St. Louis	United States	1976	Operating	
Texas Cyclone	Wood support structure	Six Flags AstroWorld	United States	1976	Removed	
Tornado	Wood support structure	Adventureland	United States	1978	Operating	
Rolling Thunder	Wood support structure	Six Flags Great Adventure	United States	1979	Removed	
Judge Roy Scream	Wood support structure	Six Flags Over Texas	United States	1980	Operating	
Cyclone; Formerly Riverside Cyclone	Wood support structure	Six Flags New England	United States	1983	Converted; Now known as Wicked Cyclone	
Monstre	Wood support structure	La Ronde	Canada	1985	Operating	
Roller Coaster; Formerly Tree Topper	Wood support structure	Upper Clements Park	Canada	1989	Removed	
Anaconda	Wood support structure	Walygator Parc	France	1989	Operating	
Sierra Tonante	Wood support structure	Mirabilandia	Italy	1992	Removed	
