= Kidzopolis =

Themed children's area at several Six Flags amusement parks

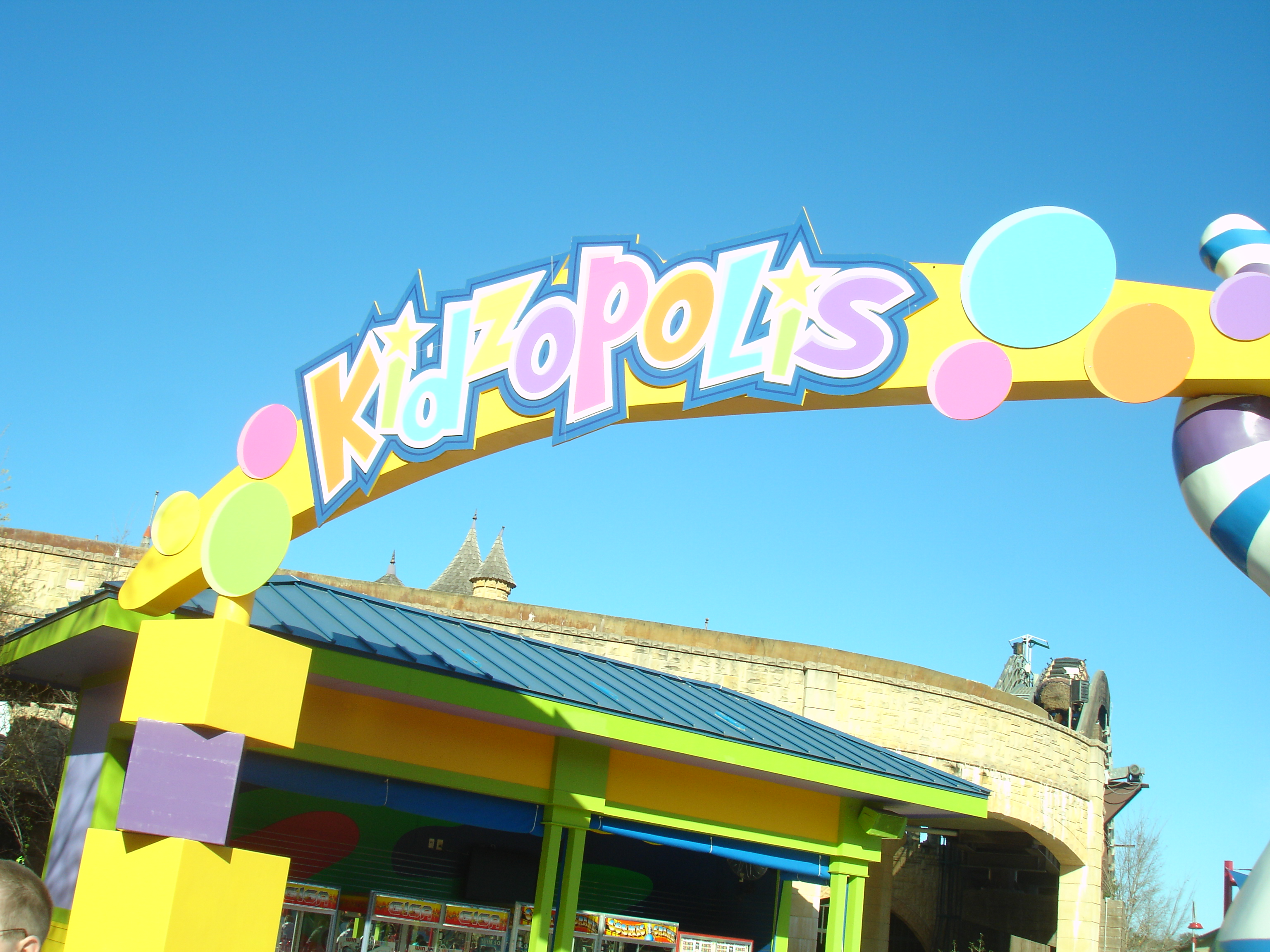
- Kidzopolis entrance at Six Flags Fiesta Texas

Six Flags Fiesta Texas
- Opening date: March 5, 2011
- Closing date: August 27, 2023
- Replaced: Wiggles World
- Replaced by: DC Universe

Six Flags New England
- Opening date: April 16, 2011
- Replaced: Wiggles World, Tiny Timber Town

Six Flags Great America
- Opening date: May 7, 2011
- Replaced: Wiggles World

Six Flags Great Escape and Hurricane Harbor
- Opening date: May 21, 2011
- Closing date: October 28, 2018
- Replaced: Wiggles World
- Replaced by: Hurricane Harbor

Ride statistics
- Attraction type: Themed area

Kidzopolis is a themed children's area with small rides at several Six Flags amusement parks. The first sections opened in 2011 at Six Flags Great America and Six Flags New England, both being re-themed from Wiggles World. Six Flags Great Escape and Hurricane Harbor and Six Flags Fiesta Texas had the area in the past, but the former's was merged into an expansion of the Hurricane Harbor water park in 2019 and the latter's was rethemed into a DC Universe area in 2024.

As of 2026, the only parks with Kidzopolis areas still in operation are Six Flags New England and Six Flags Great America.

Shared attractions located within the areas include Krazy Kups (a teacups ride), and ZoomJets (a spinning plane ride).

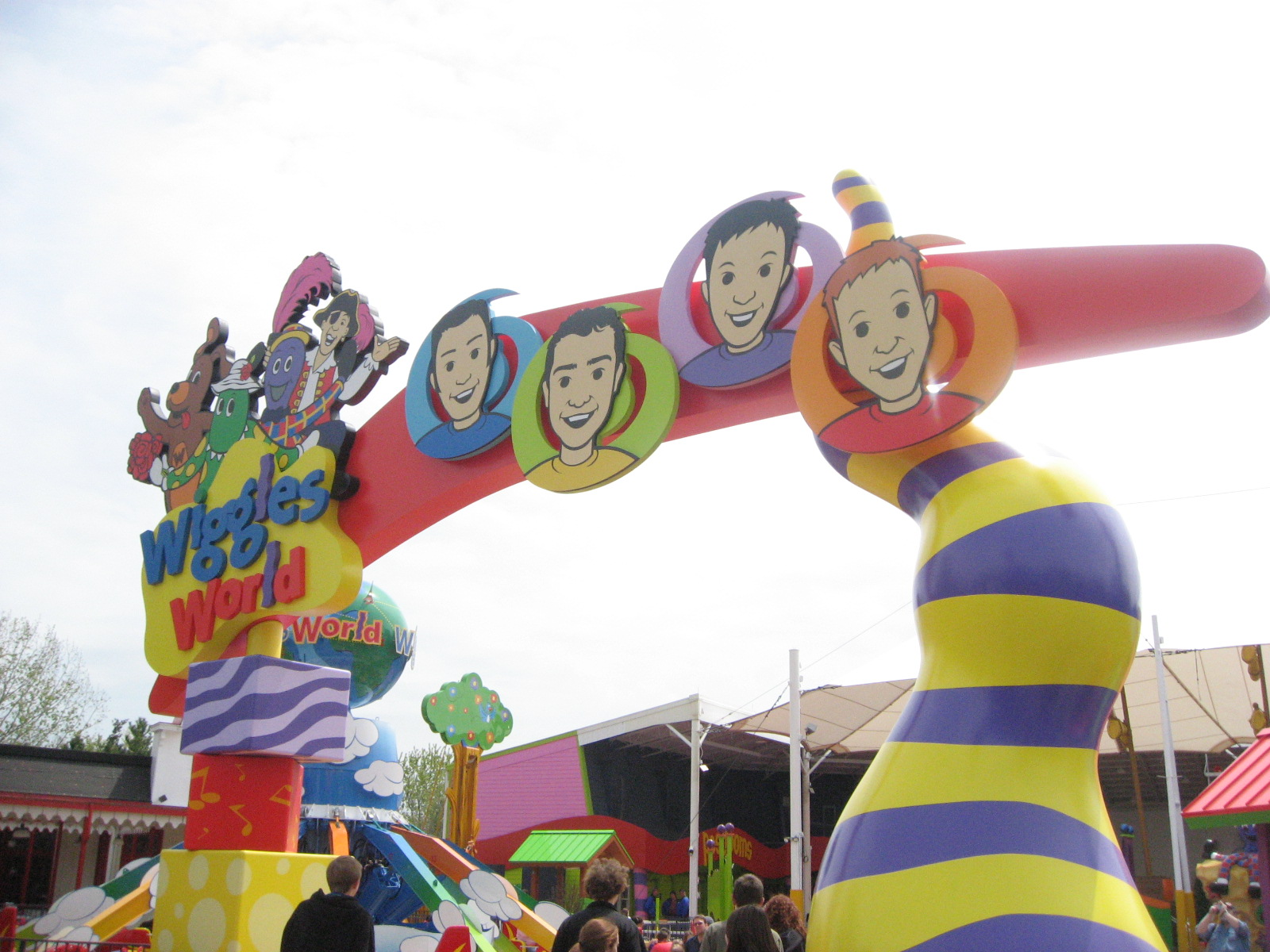
A photograph of the section's entrance at Six Flags Great America, when the section was known as Wiggles World

== History ==
On December 12, 2006, Six Flags announced their plans for 2007. The plans detailed several new corporate alliances, including with Thomas the Tank Engine, The Wiggles, and Tony Hawk. In 2007, Six Flags Great Adventure, Six Flags Great America, and Six Flags New England opened Wiggles World sections. In 2008, Six Flags Great Escape and Hurricane Harbor opened a Wiggles World section. Six Flags Fiesta Texas opened a Wiggles World section in 2009.

In late 2010, Six Flags began the process of removing licensed theming from attractions. They terminated licenses with Thomas the Tank Engine, The Wiggles, Tony Hawk, Evel Knievel, and Terminator. This resulted in the removal of all Wiggles World theming and the renaming of attractions in the sections, which would be known as Kidzopolis from 2011 onward. Six Flags Great Adventure was the only park that did not transform its Wiggles World section to Kidzopolis. Instead, their Wiggles World was transformed to Safari Kids.

After the 2018 season, Six Flags Great Escape and Hurricane Harbor removed their Krazy Kars, Krazy Kups, and Splish Splash Zone attractions to make way for an expansion of Hurricane Harbor, effectively closing the Kidzopolis section. The section's former theater was fenced off, leaving ZoomJets, which was renamed to Island Air Adventures, as the only remaining attraction from the section. Island Air Adventures now operates as part of Hurricane Harbor.

For the 2023 season, Six Flags Fiesta Texas renamed Kidzopolis to Thrill Seeker Park. All attractions retained their existing names. In August 2023, Six Flags Fiesta Texas announced that Thrill Seeker Park would be absorbed into their new DC Universe area.

== Attractions ==
Current name	Type	Previous name at Six Flags Great America	Previous name at Six Flags New England
Bouncer	Miniature drop tower	Bouncin' With Wags (2007–2010)	
Krazy Kars	Car ride	Big Red Cars (2007–2010)	Big Red Cars (2007–2010)
Krazy Kups	Teacups	Dorothy's Rosy Tea Cups (2007–2010)	Tiny's Tea Party (2001–2006); Dorothy's Rosy Tea Cups (2007–2010)
Ship's Ahoy!	Zamperla Rockin' Tug		Captain Feathersword's Rockin' Pirate Ship (2007–2010)
Splish Splash Zone	Water play area	Henry's Splish Splash/Pirate's Playship (2007–2010); Removed after 2023.	Henry's Splish Splash/S.S. Feathersword's Playship (2007–2010)
Up, Up & Away	Zamperla Balloon Race	Yummy Yummy Fruit Salad (2007–2010)	
Wacky Wheel	Miniature Ferris wheel		Chuck Wagon Wheel (2001–2006); Cold Spaghetti Western Wheel (2007–2010)
Whirlybirdz	Spinning helicopter ride		Timber Town Sky Patrol (2001–2006); Wags' Doggie Copters (2007–2010)
Wild Wheelz	Arrow Dynamics antique cars		Route 66 (1962–2014)
Zinger Swings	Swing ride		Flight of the Bumble Bees (2001–2006); Henry's Underwater Swing Band (2007–2010)
ZoomJets	Spinning plane ride	Big Red Planes (2007–2010)	Big Red Planes (2007–2010)

Key
In operation
Removed

== See also ==
- Whistlestop Park
- 2011 in amusement parks
