= Whistlestop Park =

Former themed children's area at Six Flags amusement parks

Ride statistics
- Attraction type: Themed area

Whistlestop Park was a themed children's area with various rides at several Six Flags amusement parks.

== History ==
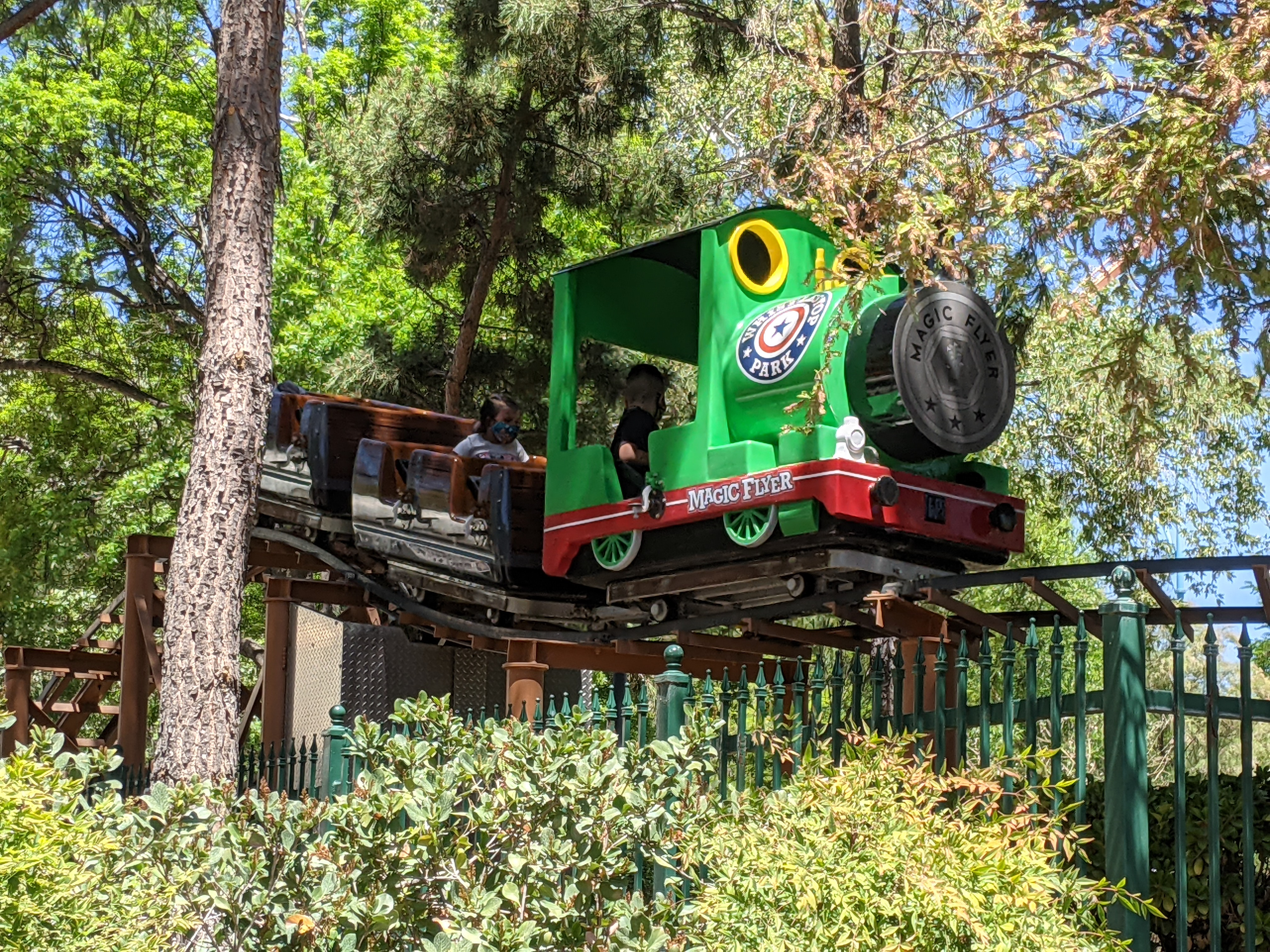
Magic Flyer at Six Flags Magic Mountain

Before being named Whistlestop Park, these themed areas were named Thomas Town from 2007 to 2010.

- 2006: On December 12, 2006, Six Flags released their plan for 2007. It detailed new corporate alliances with Thomas the Tank Engine, The Wiggles, Evel Knievel and Tony Hawk, among several others.
- 2007: Six Flags Discovery Kingdom and Six Flags New England opened Thomas Town at their parks.
- 2008: Six Flags Magic Mountain and Six Flags Over Georgia opened Thomas Town at their parks.
- 2010: Six Flags America opened Thomas Town at their park. In late 2010, Six Flags began the process of removing licensed theming from attractions. They terminated licenses with Thomas the Tank Engine, The Wiggles, Tony Hawk, Evel Knievel, and Terminator. This resulted in all Thomas Town theming to be removed and rides to be renamed to suit the new Whistlestop Park theme. Six Flags Discovery Kingdom and Six Flags New England are the only parks that won't be transforming its Thomas Town to Whistlestop Park. Six Flags Discovery Kingdom themed area will be transformed to Seaside Junction. Six Flags New England removed their Thomas Town.
- 2011: The LA Times reported Six Flags Magic Mountain plans to unveil the re-branded Whistlestop Park kiddie area on March 19. All of the existing rides opened with new names and themes. Six Flags New England released a statement on Facebook stating The Thomas Town section of the park will be home to future expansion at Six Flags New England.
- 2012: Six Flags Over Georgia removed Whistlestop Train before the 2012 season but still operating Whistlestop Park's other attractions.
- 2013: Six Flags New England announced before the 2013 season that the park will be opening up Whistlestop Park after closing Thomas Town in late 2010. SFNE also unexpectedly added Flying Aces to the area replacing Harold the Helicopter and Bertie the Bus both of which did not reopen.
- 2015: Six Flags Over Georgia removed its last ride in Whistlestop Park in the fall of 2015, Whistlestop Park Playground. The playground was removed to moved to the new kids area of the park, Bugs Bunny Boomtown with a new name, Looney Tunes Adventure Camp. Whistlestop Park has been closed off.
- 2016: Six Flags New England unannouncedly removed Flying Aces before the beginning of the 2016 season leaving the New England Express as the sole operating attraction.
- 2019: Six Flags New England changed Whistlestop Park before the 2019 season to an all access area for Six Flags members service area. New England Express still operates. Sitting vacant for 4 years, Six Flags Over Georgia rethemed the area as Screampunk District and added Pandemonium.
- 2023-2024: Six Flags America removed the kids area from their park maps and none of the rides open with the park and currently is Standing but not operating. Sky Jumper was removed and relocated to Six Flags Over Texas.
- 2025: Six Flags Magic Mountain announced that Whistlestop Park would merge with Bugs Bunny World to form Looney Tunes Land for the 2026 season. Magic Flyer will be removed and replaced with a play area named Taz's Exploration Trail, while Whistlestop Train will be rethemed and renamed as Taz's Tasmanian Train Tours.

== Locations ==
Locations with a Whistlestop Park
Location	First season	Last season	Notes
Six Flags Magic Mountain	2011	2025	Replaced the Granny Gran Prix, area will be merged with Bugs Bunny World to form Looney Tunes Land for the 2026 season
Six Flags Over Georgia	2011	2015	Replaced the Déjà Vu roller coaster and was replaced by Pandemonium
Six Flags New England	2013	2018	Replaced by the Six Flags Member Plaza entrance area, with one attraction still operating
Six Flags America	2011	2022	

== Attractions ==
=== Current ===
Attraction name	Ride type	Locations (Note: Locations will only include attractions located within Whistlestop Park, and will not include other locations if the same attraction is located at a different park under a different themed area.)	Notes
New England Express	Miniature train ride	Six Flags New England	Operating since 2007, originally as Thomas the Tank Engine until 2010. Ride reopened and was renamed in 2013

=== Former ===
Attraction name	Ride type	Locations (Note: Locations will only include attractions located within Whistlestop Park, and will not include other locations if the same attraction is located at a different park under a different themed area.)	Notes
Magic Flyer	Chance roller coaster	Six Flags Magic Mountain	Operated 1971-2025. The roller coaster has been renamed 5 different times
Whistlestop Train	Miniature train ride	Six Flags Magic Mountain	Opened in 2008, originally as Thomas the Tank Engine until 2010. Renamed in 2011
Flying Aces	Biplane Ride	Six Flags New England	Operated for two seasons from 2014-2015
Happy Junction	Convoy ride	Six Flags America	Operated as Diesel Derby in 2010 and operated as Happy Junction from 2011 to 2022
Sky Jumper	Hopper	Six Flags America	Operated as Cranky the Crane in 2010 and operated as Sky Jumper from 2011 to 2022
Splash Zone	Water play area	Six Flags America	Operated as Thomas Town Pop Jet Fountain in 2010 and operated as Splash Zone from 2011 to 2022
Up, Up & Away	Junior Ferris wheel	Six Flags America	Operated from 1993 to 2022. The Ferris wheel has been renamed 4 different times
Whistlestop Bus Line	Bus ride	Six Flags America	Operated as Bertie the Bus in 2010 and operated as Whistlestop Bus Line from 2011 to 2022
Whistlestop Bus Line	Bus ride	Six Flags New England	Operated from 2007 to 2010
Whistlestop Park Playground	Playground	Six Flags America	Operated as Thomas Town Play Structure in 2010 and operated as Whistlestop Park Playground from 2011 to 2022
Whistlestop Park Playground	Playground	Six Flags Over Georgia	Operated as Thomas Town Play Structure from 2008 to 2010 and operated as Whistlestop Park Playground from 2011 to 2015
Whistlestop Train	Miniature train ride	Six Flags America	Operated as Thomas the Tank Engine in 2010 and operated as Whistlestop Train from 2011 to 2022
Whistlestop Train	Miniature train ride	Six Flags Over Georgia	Operated as Thomas the Tank Engine from 2008 to 2010 and operated as Whistlestop Train from 2011 to 2013
Whistlestop Whirlybirds	Rotating helicopter ride	Six Flags America	Operated as Harold the Helicopter in 2010 and operated as Whistlestop Whirlybirds from 2011 to 2022
Whistlestop Whirlybirds	Rotating helicopter ride	Six Flags New England	Operated as Harold the Helicopter from 2007 to 2010

== See also ==
- KIDZOPOLIS
- 2011 in amusement parks
- 2013 in amusement parks

== Notes and references ==
Notes
