= Six Flags New England =

Theme park in Agawam, Massachusetts

- Previously known as Gallup's Grove (1870–1886); Riverside Grove (1887–1911); Riverside Park (1912–1995); Riverside: The Great Escape (1996–1999)
- Logo used since 2025

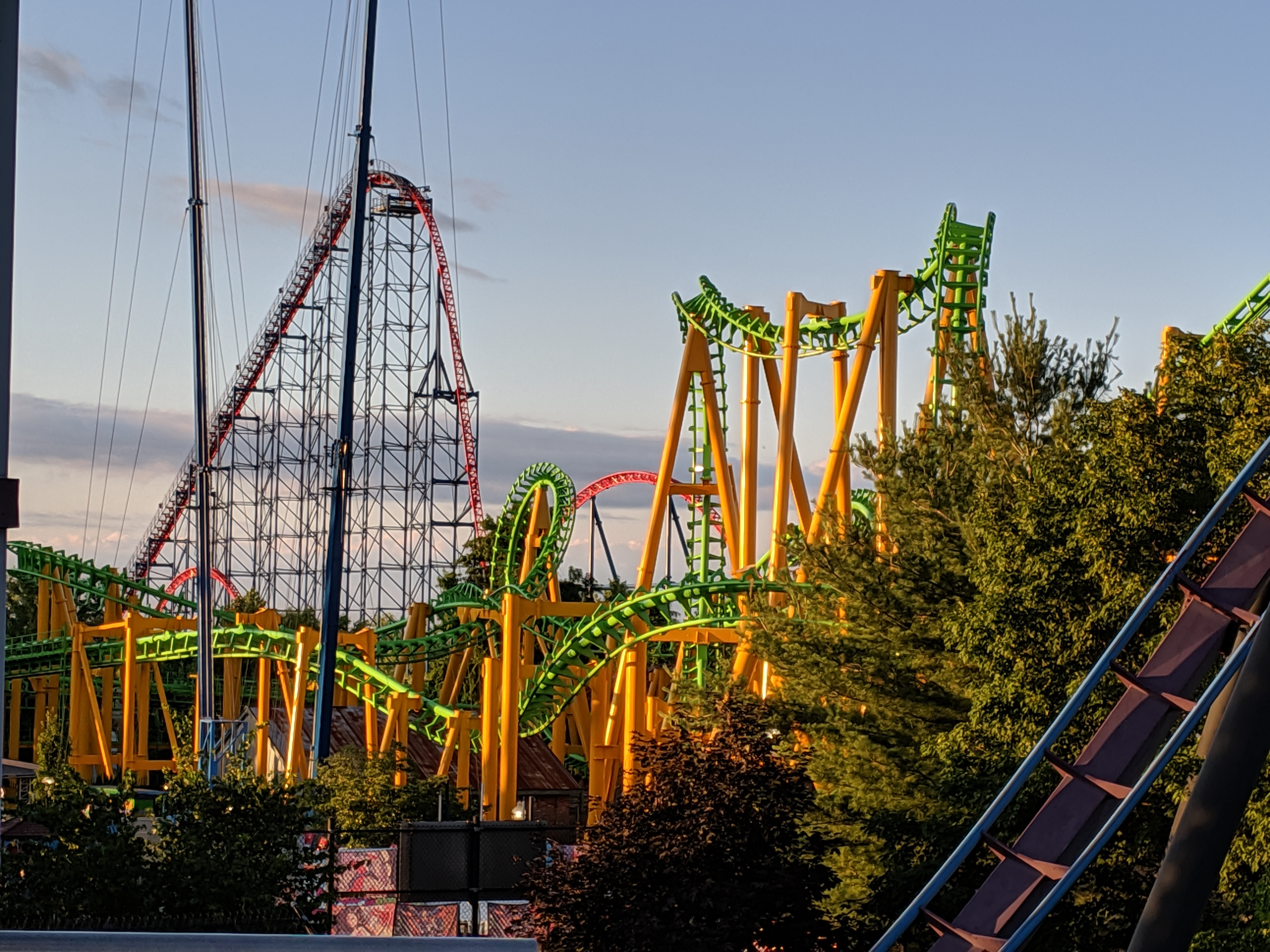
- Interactive map of Six Flags New England
- Location: Agawam, Massachusetts, United States
- Coordinates: 42.0377°N 72.6157°W
- Status: Operating
- Opened: 1870; 156 years ago
- Owner: Six Flags
- General manager: William Falzone
- Slogan: The Thrill Capital of New England
- Operating season: April through Early November
- Area: 235 acres (95 ha)

Attractions
- Total: 62
- Roller coasters: 12 (as of 2026)
- Water rides: 1
- Website: sixflags.com/newengland

Six Flags New England is an amusement park located in Agawam, Massachusetts. Opening in the late 19th century, it is the oldest amusement park in the Six Flags chain, acquired by Premier Parks in 1996 and rebranded Six Flags New England in 2000. Superman The Ride is among the park's most notable rides, having appeared as a highly ranked roller coaster in the annual Golden Ticket Awards from Amusement Today since the ride opened in 2000.

== History ==
Throughout much of the 20th century, the park was known as Riverside Park. It began as a picnic grove in 1870 named Gallup's Grove. It was briefly changed to Riverside Grove, and then eventually Riverside Park in 1912. Prior to 1900, most of the park's patrons arrived via steamship. The Springfield Street Railway extended its line to the park in 1900 and, although Riverside was at the end of the Springfield Street Railway, it was not owned by the railway and is, therefore, not considered a trolley park, contrary to published reports.

In the early 1900s, a few mechanical rides and a carousel were added. The park was purchased in 1911 by Henry J. Perkins who transformed the park from a picnic grove to an amusement park. He built the park's first roller coaster, The Giant Dip, in 1912, which proved to be so popular that another coaster, The Greyhound, was added in 1915. Under Perkins' ownership, the park continued to prosper and additional amusements were added, including a 300-foot-diameter pool that became known as Lake Takadip. The original Giant Dip coaster was replaced in 1920 by a new, more thrilling coaster that was twice the size of the Giant and was eventually named Lightning. A third coaster, Whirlwind Racer, was added in 1928.

=== Closure and re-opening ===
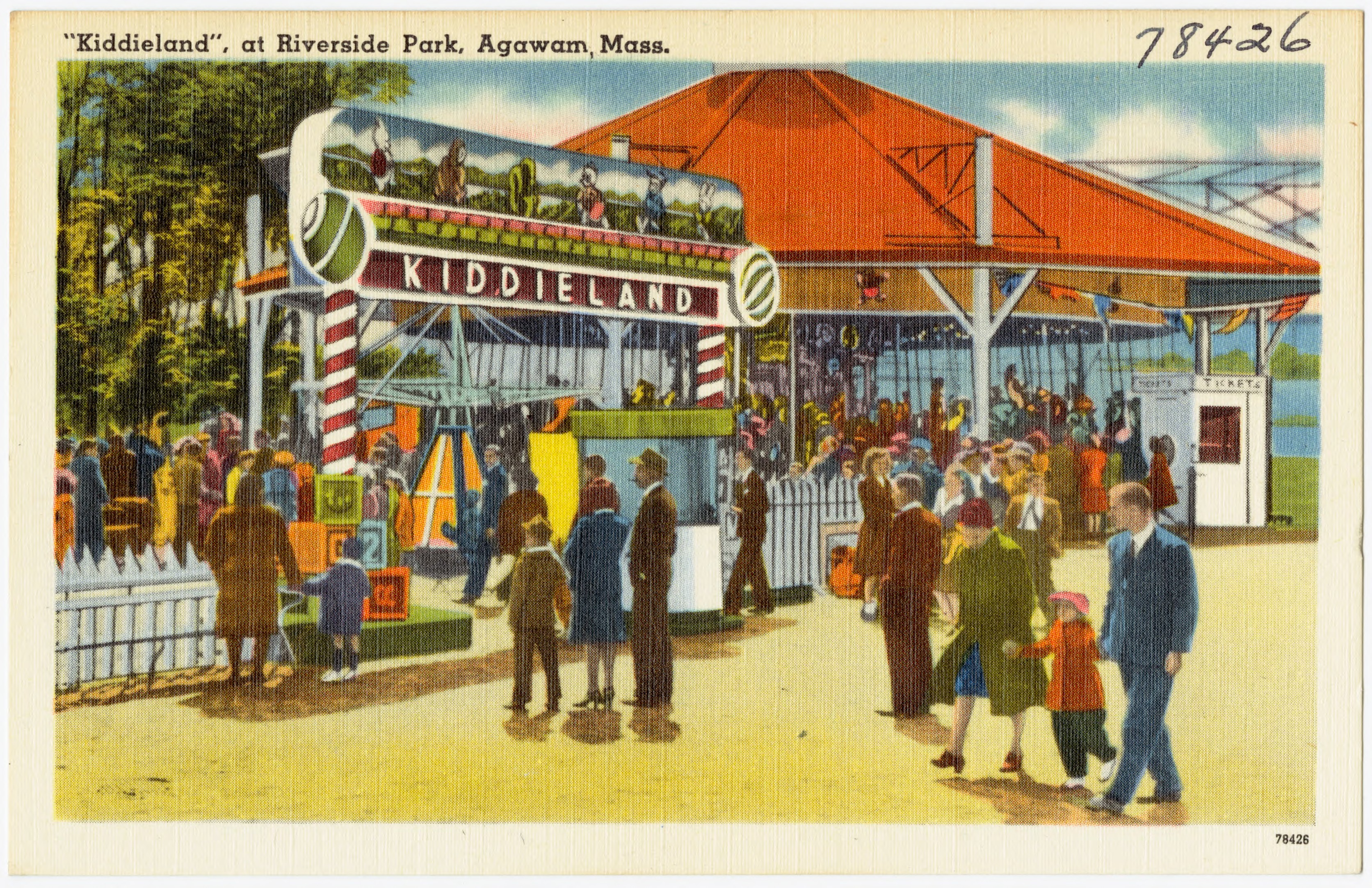
Postcard c. 1940s

The Wall Street Crash of 1929 took its toll on the park and by 1931 it had gone into foreclosure. For the 1932 season, the park operated only Wednesday through Sunday, and in 1933 it closed. Several attempts to reopen the park failed and it remained closed through 1939, although the grounds were occasionally used for company picnics. A drive-in movie theater operated in the parking lot from 1937 to 1939.

Edward Carroll Sr. purchased the abandoned park in 1939 and after making improvements, reopened Riverside Park on May 29, 1940. Carroll is credited with rescuing Riverside and turning it into the largest theme park in New England. He purchased the plans and cars of the 1939 New York World's Fair Cyclone Roller Coaster and opened a new coaster in 1941. That coaster, now known as Thunderbolt, is operating at the park and is the oldest coaster — in its original location — within the entire Six Flags chain of theme parks. The park continued to add new rides and removed some older ones. The theater was removed in the late 1950s, making Riverside Park a seasonal attraction and then by the late 1950s the park opened from mid to late April and concluded at the end of October every year since the late 1950s and it still is today.

Carroll took a liking to auto racing, a sport that was gaining popularity in the Northeast after World War II, and added it to his slate of attractions at Riverside, building the Riverside Park Speedway in 1948, replacing an open-air bandstand. The Old West Village and Eldorado Train Ride were built in 1960 but the ride sadly was destroyed by a fire in September 1971 and it was never rebuilt. The 1960s was a popular period for stock car racing at Riverside Park. NASCAR began to hold events at Riverside Park Speedway in 1976. In 1968 the park added its first steel coaster called the Wildcat and in 1977, Riverside Park added its first looping roller coaster, The Loop Coaster, later known as Black Widow. After a new roller rink was built in 1978, the former roller rink building, opened in 1916, was demolished in 1979 to expand the park. In 1998, the rink was closed and is now the human resources building. Edward J. Carrol Sr died in 1979, but the park continued to be successful throughout the 1970s and the 1980s. In 1979 the park invested in an Arrow Development log flume known as Red River Rapids. It became the park's first water ride. It was later renamed Poland Spring Plunge. By the 1980s, the park stopped selling individual ride tickets and began charging a "pay one price" admission.

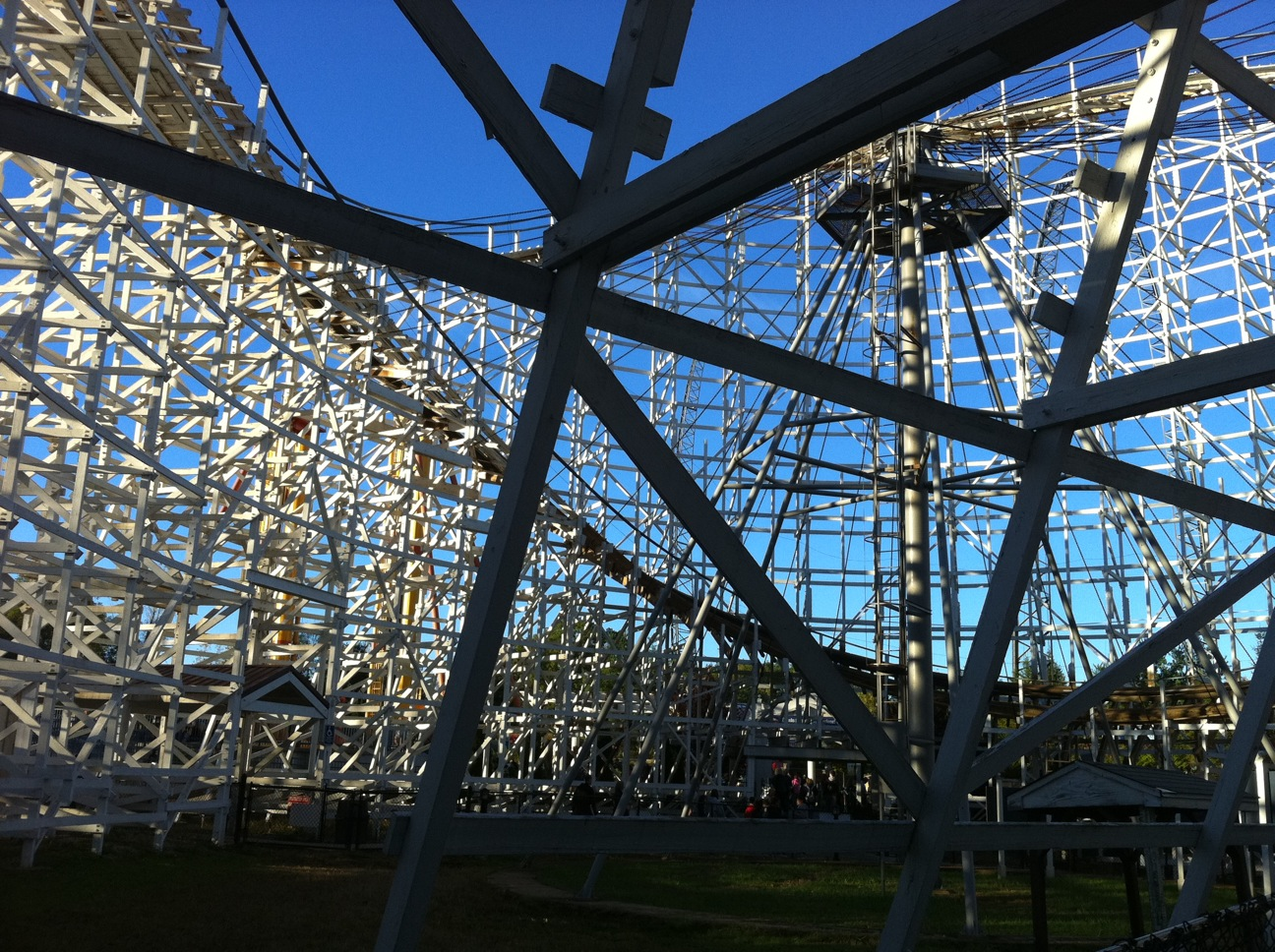
Cyclone roller coaster, 2010

Six years after the opening of Black Widow, the Wildcat was removed and moved to the late Rocky Point Park in Rhode Island. In 1983, Riverside Park added its third roller coaster, which was also the park's second wooden coaster. The owners originally wanted a coaster exactly like the Coney Island Cyclone, but space was limited, so the coaster would need to take up less space and would have sharper twists and turns. It became known as the Riverside Cyclone. In 1987, Riverside attempted to build a white-water rafting ride called the Lost River Water Ride. Plagued with problems, the attraction never opened and was subsequently abandoned. A majority of the ride was demolished in 1989 to make way for Wild River Falls, a waterslide complex consisting of three sets of slides: Riptide, Blue Lightning and Pipeline. A popular attraction, Wild River Falls remained in operation until the opening of the Island Kingdom Waterpark in 1997.

In 1994, Riverside partnered with Lady Luck Gaming in a proposal to build a hotel and dockside casino complex at the park, one of several competing casino proposals in the state. The plan died after Agawam voters rejected a non-binding referendum in support of casino gambling in November.

=== Purchase by Premier Parks ===
During the 1996 season, the track on the Musik Express was damaged and the attraction remained closed for a portion of the year. A Chance Chaos was ordered and was scheduled to open for the 1997 season. In December of 1996, the Carroll family agreed to sell the park to Premier Parks of Oklahoma City, Oklahoma. In the Spring of 1997, Premier Parks renamed the park to Riverside: The Great Escape.

Under Premier Parks, various changes were made to the park. For the 1997 season, the new owners invested more than $20 million on general improvements and several new attractions. A new front entrance to the park was constructed, which included the expansion and renovation of Main Street U.S.A. and the relocation and renovation of the carousel. The Island Kingdom Waterpark was an expansion to the park that featured a children's water play area, various slides, and a wave pool. This expansion was added to the south end of the park next to the park's log flume in the location of the parking lot. To make room for this expansion, the parking lot was relocated to the other side of the roadway in former farmland and significantly expanded.

Other additions in 1997 included Mind Eraser (later renamed to The Riddler Revenge) and Shipwreck Falls. In the process of renovation, some older rides such as the Bayern Kurve and The Monorail were removed. The Southern Center midway was rethemed to a 1950s city named Rockville.

In 1998, the water park was further expanded, with additions such as a lazy river, another children's play structure called Hook's Lagoon, a speed slide tower called Cannonball, a family raft slide called Swiss Family Toboggan, and a multi-slide tower called Big Kahuna. The park also added The Hellevator, an S&S Worldwide Turbo Drop tower measuring 21 stories tall, which was originally painted red.

=== Six Flags ===
On April 1, 1998, Premier Parks acquired the Six Flags chain of parks from Time Warner. The park continued to be known as "Riverside" until the end of the 1999 season. In 1999, the waterpark was doubled in size. Additions included a new slide tower named Shark Attack and a second wave pool called Hurricane Bay. The park also added a Hopkins river raft ride named Blizzard River to the North End, replacing a set of dry slides and the old Bumper Cars. Blizzard River was themed to incorporate the Penguin character from the Batman franchise; however, the name of the ride was never changed when the park was allowed to use characters from DC Comics on their rides. A new western area called Crackaxle Canyon was added and included four rides, three of which were new to the park. The Riverside Park Speedway was also removed.

In 2000, Riverside was rebranded "Six Flags New England," reflecting similar changes made at other Six Flags properties. On the former site of the racetrack, a new DC Comics-themed section of the park was installed, called "DC Super Hero Adventures." The area featured several new rides, including Superman – Ride of Steel, a hypercoaster designed by Intamin. The park also added Flashback, a relocated Vekoma Boomerang from Kentucky Kingdom, which replaced the Black Widow and Rotor in the North End. Two S&S Worldwide Combo drop tower rides were added next to the Hellevator; the entire drop tower complex was painted white and named Scream. A pedestrian bridge was also constructed over the roadway in front of the park to provide a safer connection between the parking lot and front entrance.

In 2003, the water park was renamed to Hurricane Harbor and saw the addition of the Tornado water slide.

Mr. Six's Pandemonium, a Gerstlauer spinning coaster, was added for the 2005 season in the North End of the park. The Mr. Six name was dropped from the attraction ahead of the 2007 season. At the end of the 2005 season, the Poland Spring Plunge log flume and ferris wheel were removed.

In 2006, Splash Water Falls and Catapult, an S&S Power Sky Swatter, were added to the park, two relocated rides from the recently closed Six Flags AstroWorld. Splash Water Falls replaced the log flume and ferris wheel in the South End of the park, and Catapult was located in the North End of the park near Cyclone.

In 2007, two new children's areas were introduced to the park: Wiggles World and Thomas Town. Wiggles World was located on the site of the former Tiny Timber Town children's section, which saw the introduction of a few new rides and attractions but also consisted of a few rethemed attractions. Thomas Town was located near the front gate of the park and included three rides and a splash pad.

In 2008, Six Flags New England was set to open The Dark Knight Coaster, an indoor MACK Wild Mouse coaster based on the upcoming film of the same name. The park's other Batman-based attraction had its name briefly changed from Batman – The Dark Knight to Batman: The Ride to avoid confusion. However, due to apparent permit issues, the ride was canceled and dismantled, being sent to Six Flags Mexico. The ride would have cost the park $7.5 million in exchange for bringing $280,000 in taxes for the state of Massachusetts. The cancellation angered the city of Agawam, which stated that issues with the ride were not evident. The park then announced the new "Glow in the Park Parade". On November 8, 2008, the Town of Agawam allowed Six Flags the right to build roller coasters up to 200 feet (61 m) in height.

At the end of the 2008 season, it was announced that Superman – Ride of Steel would be rethemed to Bizarro. The track was repainted purple with dark blue supports, and multiple special effects were added; including building structures that give riders the impression of speeding through a city, rings in the shape of Bizarro's S shield that the train passes through, and flame effects. Two new trains with on-board audio were purchased. Bizarro opened on May 22, 2009 at the start of Memorial Day weekend.

In 2010, a new children's area called Mr. Six's Splash Island was added to Hurricane Harbor. This increased the number of children's areas in the park to four. At the end of the 2010 season, Six Flags began removing various intellectual properties from their parks. Wiggles World was rethemed to Kidzopolis ahead of the 2011 season. Thomas Town, because of low guest foot traffic due to its location close to the front gate of the park, was closed following the end of the 2010 season.

In 2011, Gotham City Gauntlet: Escape From Arkham Asylum opened up in the DC Super Hero Adventures section of the park. This ride replaced the football field and was placed on the same plot of land that the canceled Dark Knight Coaster was supposed to be built on. The same year, the "Mr. Six's" portion of Mr. Six's Splash Island was dropped, effectively renaming the area to Splash Island.

In late August 2011, it was announced that Goliath would be added to the park for the 2012 season in the location of Shipwreck Falls, a water ride located in the North End of the park. Shipwreck Falls closed permanently toward the end of the 2011 season. Goliath opened in the Crackaxle Canyon section of the park on May 25, 2012, as well as a new restaurant known as JB's Smokehouse.

A month before opening day in 2013, Catapult was unexpectedly removed and scrapped. The park announced ahead of the season that the former Thomas Town would reopen for the 2013 season as Whistlestop Park. In May of that same year, a new water ride opened in Hurricane Harbor known as Bonzai Pipelines. At the conclusion of the 2013 season, Taz's DareDevil Dive and Twister, a HUSS Topspin located in Rockville, were removed.

New England SkyScreamer opened in 2014 and, at the time of its opening, was the world's largest swing ride at 408 feet in height. The SkyWay attraction permanently closed at the conclusion of the 2014 season.

On July 20, 2014, Cyclone permanently closed. Construction signs were quickly put up, and, during August of the same year, it was announced that Rocky Mountain Construction would transform the ride into a steel hybrid coaster, which would include three inversions and a steeper drop. Wicked Cyclone opened in May 2015.

In 2016, two new attractions were opened: Fireball and Superman The Ride. Fireball, a Larson Loop attraction, was installed in the former location of Twister. Bizarro was transformed back into Superman, which included a new red track color and other effects.

In 2017, The Joker, a 4D FreeFly coaster, was installed on the former site of Splash Water Falls, which closed toward the end of the 2016 season. Mind Eraser, the park's SLC, received new trains with an updated restraint style. Superman The Ride had a limited run of offering Oculus Rift goggles to enhance the ride experience. Buzzsaw closed at the end of the 2017 season.

Harley Quinn Spinsanity opened in May 2018. To make room for it, the Tea Cups were moved to the former location of Buzzsaw and is now classified as an attraction in Rockville. The South End was transformed into Gotham City. This included retheming Mind Eraser to The Riddler Revenge, which received a new color scheme with green track and yellow supports.

For the 2019 season, Cyborg: Hyper Drive, a spinning flat ride, was installed inside the former Hall of Justice building in the DC Super Hero Adventures area of the park. This ride is the first to include the fictional character Grid, a sentient cybernetic system and the arch-nemesis of Cyborg, in Six Flags' DC character roster. Kryptonite Kollider, formerly known as The Joker's Wildcard, was removed at the end of the season.

For the 2020 season, the park announced the addition of Supergirl Sky Flyer, a Zamperla Endeavour located on the site of the former Kryptonite Kollider. As a result of the park not opening for the 2020 season due to the COVID-19 pandemic, the opening of Supergirl Sky Flyer was to delayed to May 2021. The DC Super Hero Adventures section of the park was rethemed to DC Universe, which features newly installed superhero statues and freshly painted buildings.

Goliath was left standing but not operating (SBNO) for the 2021 season and was removed from the park map. In July 2021, a tree fell onto Fireball during a thunderstorm, extensively damaging the attraction and leaving it closed for the rest of the season. Both Goliath and Fireball were scrapped prior to the 2022 season. The plot of land occupied by Goliath was left as a large grass area and known as Crackaxle Commons for the 2023 and 2024 seasons.

Before the start of the 2024 season, Kontiki was removed from the park. Bonzai Pipelines was left SBNO for the 2023 and 2024 seasons, and Typhoon was left SBNO for the 2024 season. Both attractions — as well as Tomahawk, the park's HUSS Frisbee — were removed ahead of the 2025 season.

On August 15, 2024, a replacement for Goliath was announced. Quantum Accelerator is an Intamin Straddle Coaster which opened in April 2026 featuring two launches up to 45 MPH and 11 airtime moments.

== Attractions ==
Six Flags New England is home to many rides and attractions, including Superman: The Ride. Superman: The Ride is 208 feet (63 m) tall and drops 221 feet (67 m) into a tunnel, reaching a top speed of 77 mph (124 km/h). It is considered one of the best steel roller coasters in the world according to the trade magazine Amusement Today, which awarded it the prestigious Golden Ticket award in 2003, 2006, 2007, 2008 and 2009.

=== Roller coasters ===
Ride name	Picture	Opened	Manufacturer	Model/Type	Location	Notes	Thrill Rating
Thunderbolt		1941	Joseph E. Drambour	Figure 8 wooden roller coaster	Main Street	Oldest roller coaster in the park.	Moderate
The Great Chase		1996	E&F Miler Industries	Family Coaster/ 16 ft Outside Spiral CCW	Looney Tunes Movie Town	Originally named Rolling Thunder it replaced Little Rickie's Little Twister coaster.	Mild
The Riddler Revenge		1997	Vekoma	Suspended Looping Coaster	Gotham City	A Vekoma Suspended Looping Coaster. Formerly named Mind Eraser from 1997 to 2017.	Aggressive
Superman The Ride		2000	Intamin	Megacoaster	DC Universe	Formerly known as Superman – Ride of Steel (from 2000 to 2008) and Bizarro (from 2009 – 2015). This ride used Samsung virtual reality headsets during the 2016 season.	Aggressive
Catwoman's Whip		2000	Zierer	Tivoli – Large	DC Universe	Originally named Poison Ivy's Tangled Train (from 2000 to 2006).	Mild
Flashback		2000	Vekoma	Boomerang	North End	Originally at Star Lake Amusement Park as Boomerang, then Kentucky Kingdom as Vampire.	Aggressive
Batman: The Dark Knight		2002	Bolliger & Mabillard	Floorless Coaster	Gotham City	During the 2008 season, Batman: The Dark Knight was temporarily renamed Batman: The Ride to prevent confusion with The Dark Knight Coaster that was ultimately cancelled.	Aggressive
Pandemonium		2005	Gerstlauer	Spinning Coaster Model 420/4	North End	Originally named Mr. Six's Pandemonium. In 2007, Mr. Six was dropped from the title.	Moderate
Gotham City Gauntlet: Escape from Arkham Asylum		2011	Maurer Söhne	Wild Mouse Classic	DC Universe	Originally Road Runner Express at Kentucky Kingdom.	Moderate
Wicked Cyclone		2015	Rocky Mountain Construction	I-Box	North End	Originally Cyclone, a wooden coaster designed by William Cobb and opened in 1983. It was reconstructed and re-tracked with steel by RMC in 2015.	Aggressive
The Joker		2017	S&S Worldwide	4th Dimension roller coaster	Gotham City	Replaced Splash Water Falls.	Aggressive
Quantum Accelerator		2026	Intamin	Family Launch Straddle Coaster	Crackaxle Canyon	Replaced Goliath.	Moderate

=== Flat rides ===
Ride name	Opened	Manufacturer/Type	Location	Notes
1909 Illions Carousel	1940	M.C. Illions Carousel	Main Street	Among the horses, a lion, a tiger and a zebra can be seen on the carousel. Originally, the carousel was in a different location when the park was Riverside. When Six Flags bought the park, they relocated the carousel to its location at the front gate, where it has been since 1997.
Scrambler	1973	Eli Bridge Scrambler	North End	A scrambler ride.
Gotham City Crime Wave	1978	Zierer Swings	Gotham City	Up until the end of the 2006 season, the ride was located near Scream! under the name of "Adult Wave Swinger."
Balloon Race	1998	Zamperla Balloon Race	North End	No minimum height requirement with an adult.
Stampede Bumper Cars	1997	Zamperla Bumper Cars	Crackaxle Canyon	Bumper Cars are powered from the floor, which means there is no receiver on the back of the car.
Scream!	1998	S&S Worldwide 3-tower Combo Complex	Main Street	Originally a one-tower Turbo Drop called Hellavator. Two combo towers were added in 2000. Original tower is still a Turbo Drop.
Blizzard River	1999	Hopkins Rides River rafting ride	North End	Eight riders careen down a concrete channel in a raft while passing rapids, whirlpools and waterfalls.
Houdini – The Great Escape	1999	Vekoma Madhouse	Crackaxle Canyon	No minimum height requirement with an adult.
Tea Cups	1999	Zamperla Tea Cups	Rockville	A tea cup ride. The ride originally had no canopy. Relocated to the former location of Buzzsaw for the 2018 season to make room for Harley Quinn Spinsanity.
New England SkyScreamer	2014	Funtime Star Flyer	North End	It was the tallest swing ride in the world until the Orlando Starflyer opened in spring 2018. The New England SkyScreamer stands at 408 feet in height.
Rock n' Rodeo	2016	SBF Visa Group Traffic Jam	Crackaxle Canyon	A spinning family ride located on the former Rodeo's pad.
Harley Quinn Spinsanity	2018	Zamperla Giant Discovery	Gotham City	A very large pendulum ride with outward-facing seats that swings back and forth. The pendulum reaches a top speed of 70 mph and soars 14 stories high. Nightwing and Tea Cups were relocated to make space for the ride.
Cyborg: Hyper Drive	2019	Chance Rides Freestyle	DC Universe	An indoor spinning ride with outward facing seats. Themed to Cyborg and Grid. The ride was announced as "Cyborg" in August 2018 but was changed to "Cyborg: Hyper Drive" in February 2019. Located inside the former Hall of Justice building.
Supergirl Sky Flyer	2021	Zamperla Endeavour	DC Universe	A spinning attraction that eventually lifts to a 90 degree angle inverting riders. The ride was meant to open during the 2020 season but was delayed to the 2021 season as a result of the COVID-19 pandemic. Located on the site of the former Kryptonite Kollider.
Dino Off Road Adventure	2023	Arrow Entertainment	Kidzopolis	Originally called Wild Wheelz (Route 66 from 1962 to 2014), a children antique car ride that has animatronics of dinosaurs.

=== Children's rides ===
Ride name	Opened	Manufacturer/Type	Location	Notes
Animation Department	1998	Zamperla kiddie swings ride	Looney Tunes Movie Town	Children's swing ride.
Daffy's Hollywood Tours	1998	Zamperla Crazy Bus	Looney Tunes Movie Town	Children's bus ride.
Taz's Prop Delivery	1998	Zamperla Big Foot	Looney Tunes Movie Town	Children's truck ride.
Tweety's Clubhouse	1999	Zamperla Jumpin' Star	Looney Tunes Movie Town	Children's drop ride.
Wacky Wheel	2001	Kiddie Ferris Wheel	Kidzopolis	Originally named Chuck Wagon Wheel and later Cold Spaghetti Western Wheel.
Whirlybirdz	2001	SBF kiddie ride	Kidzopolis	Originally named Timber Town Sky Patrol and later Wags' Doggie Copters.
Krazy Kups	2001	Zamperla Mini Tea Cups	Kidzopolis	Originally named Tiny's Tea Party and later Dorothy's Rosy Tea Cups.
Zinger Swings	2001	SBF kiddie ride	Kidzopolis	Originally named Flight of the Bumble Bees and later Henry's Underwater Swing Band.
Krazy Kars	2007	Zamperla Sports car ride	Kidzopolis	Originally named Big Red Cars.
New England Express	2007	Miniature train ride	Main Street	Originally named Thomas the Tank Engine from 2007 to 2010. (Closed from 2011 to 2012). Remnants of Whistlestop Park are used for theme of the train ride.
Ship's Ahoy!	2007	Zamperla Rockin' Tug	Kidzopolis	Originally named Captain Feathersword's Rockin' Pirate Ship.
Splish Splash Zone	2007	Playground and water play area	Kidzopolis	Originally named Henry's Splish Splash.
Wile E. Coyote's Speed Trap	1998	Zamperla kiddie whip	Looney Tunes Movie Town	The ride was moved to the former location of the Looney Tunes Movie Town stage for the 2018 season to make way for an expanded bathroom in the area.
ZoomJets	2007	Zamperla Telecombat	Kidzopolis	Originally Big Red Planes.

=== Former attractions ===
Many former attractions were present since before the former Riverside Park (Massachusetts) was acquired by Premier Parks, LLC in 1996 and rebranded Six Flags New England in 2000.

Ride	Year opened	Year closed	Service Years	Description/Noted
Roller Coasters
Giant Dip	1912	1919	7	Wooden roller coaster.
Greyhound	1915	1933	18	John A. Miller-built wooden roller coaster.
Lightning	1920	1933	13	John A. Miller-built wooden roller coaster.
Whirlwind Racer	1928	1933	5	Harry G. Traver-built wooden roller coaster.
Wild Mouse	1957	Unknown	Unknown	B. A. Schiff & Associates Wild Mouse roller coaster.
Wildcat	1968	1983	15	Schwarzkopf Wildcat (65m.) roller coaster it got relocated to Rocky Point Park in Rhode Island.
Black Widow	1977	1999	22	Arrow Dynamics Launched Loop roller coaster. Replaced with Flashback. Coaster was relocated to the Old Indiana Fun Park in 2000, where it sat unbuilt until it was scrapped by mid 2006.
Little Rickie's Little Twister	1949	1999	50	Little Dipper kiddie roller coaster. Coaster was relocated to the Old Indiana Fun Park in 2000, where it sat unbuilt until it was scrapped by mid 2006. Got Replaced by the Great Chase.
The Dark Knight Coaster	2008	2008	N/A	Mack Rides Indoor Wild Mouse. Planned for 2008, partially installed and then cancelled. It was relocated to Six Flags México and opened in 2009.
Cyclone	1983	2014	31	William Cobb Wooden Coaster. Originally Named Riverside Cyclone. Rebuilt as Wicked Cyclone, which opened in 2015.
Goliath	2012	2019	7	Giant inverted boomerang. Formerly Déjà Vu at Six Flags Magic Mountain from 2001–2011. After the entire park remained closed for the 2020 season due to the COVID-19 pandemic, the ride was not shown on the 2021 park map and left standing but not operating. The ride was removed before the 2022 season.
Other Rides
Monorail	1959	1996	37	Monorail attraction.
Wild Wheelz	1962	2022	50	Children's antique car ride. Known as Route 66 from 1962 to 2014. The attraction formerly utilized Arrow cars but was replaced by Gould cars in 2015. Upgraded to Dino Off Road Adventure in 2023.
Rotor	1973	1999	16	Rotor attraction Replaced with Flashback.
Eldorado Train Ride	1960	1971	11	old west village and train ride that was located next to the Thunderbolt roller coaster it operated from 1960 thru 1971 as in September 1971 the ride was destroyed by a fire.
Poland Spring Plunge	1979	2005	36	Log flume ride. Originally named Red River Rapids. Replaced by Splash Water Falls.
Colossus	1987	2005	18	150 ft. ferris wheel. Replaced by Crime Wave.
Chaos	1997	2005	8	Chance Chaos. Replaced by a large bathroom building.
Spider	1968	2006	38	Octopus-style ride. The former ride pad has sat vacant since the ride's closure.
Bumper Buggies	1990 or earlier	2007	Unknown	Children's bumper cars. The old ride building has yet to be replaced.
Rodeo	1998	2007	9	HUSS Breakdance. Replaced by Rockin' Rodeo in 2016. It was sold and relocated to Loudoun Castle in Galston, East Aryshire, Scotland, where it opened in 2008 as Stormbreaker.
Double Trouble	1999	2007	8	Chance Double Inverter. Replaced by a basketball game.
Time Warp	1997	2008	11	Vekoma Air Jumper. Located near Pandemonium. The former rad pad has sat vacant since the ride's closure.
Nightwing	2000	2008	8	HUSS Fly Away. Replaced by Joker's Wildcard.
Bertie The Bus	2007	2010	3	Children's ride located in Thomas Town. The former ride pad has sat vacant since the ride's closure.
Harold The Helicopter	2007	2010	3	Children's ride located in Thomas Town. The former ride pad has sat vacant since the ride's closure.
Foghorn Leghorn Tinsel Town Train	Unknown	2011	unknown	Children's ride located in Looney Tunes Movie Town. The former ride area was replaced by a seating area.
Shipwreck Falls	1997	2011	14	Replaced with Goliath, a Giant Inverted Boomerang.
Marvin the Martian Earthbound Journey	2000	2011	11	Children's ride located in Looney Tunes Movie Town. Relocated to Six Flags Over Texas.
Catapult	2006	2012	6	S&S Sky Swat. Located in what is now the queue of New England SkyScreamer. Removed in March 2013. Formerly known as SWAT at Six Flags Astroworld from 2003 to 2005.
Taz's Daredevil Dive	1992	2013	22	Skycoaster. Replaced with New England SkyScreamer. Originally named the Riverside Skycoaster.
Twister	1997	2013	16	HUSS Top Spin. Replaced by Fireball in 2015.
New England Sky Way	1973	2014	41	Von Roll Sky-Ride. Transported riders between an elevated station adjacent to Thunderbolt and a station adjacent to Scrambler. In 1998, the ride had received new gondolas from the defunct Skyride formerly located at Opryland USA. The supports for the ride remained in the park's North End as fixtures for electric lights through the end of the 2023 season. The station adjacent to Thunderbolt has sat vacant since the ride's closure. The station adjacent to Scrambler was used as locker storage for Wicked Cyclone from 2015–2016.
Flying Aces	2001	2015	14	Whistlestop Park biplane ride. Originally located in Tiny Timber Town from 2001–2006, the ride was put in storage when Wiggles World was added. The ride was added back to the park in 2013 in the former location of Harold The Helicopter in Whistlestop Park. The ride was removed again after the 2015 season.
Splash Water Falls	2006	2016	9	Formerly located in the South End. It was replaced by The Joker.
Buzzsaw	1983	2017	34	Zierer Flying Carpet ride located in the South End. Originally named The Screamer and later the Slingshot. Removed at the end of 2017 season and replaced by Tea Cups.
Kryptonite Kollider	2000	2019	19	A Chance Rides Wipeout. Originally located in the Justice League building with the name "The Joker's Wildcard." It closed in 2004 and was put into storage. It returned for the 2009 season at the former location of Nightwing. The ride was rethemed to "Kryptonite" and then changed to "Kryptonite Kollider" for the 2017 season. The attraction was retired at the end of the 2019 season to make way for Supergirl Sky Flyer.
Fireball	2016	2021	5	A Larson International 22M Giant Loop. The ride was located in Rockville in the former location of Twister. The attraction was destroyed by a fallen tree in a rain storm during the 2021 season. The ride was SBNO for the remainder of the 2021 season and was removed before the start of the 2022 season.
Nightwing	2009	2022	13	An upcharge Slingshot ride. Formerly named The Blitz and Slingshot. After being relocated to the park from Six Flags St. Louis, the ride was located in the DC Super Hero Adventures section before being moved to the South End in 2011. Relocated to an area in front of The Riddler Revenge for the 2018 season to make room for Harley Quinn Spinsanity and was known as Nightwing until its closure in 2022.
Bonzai Pipelines	2013	2022	9	A Proslide SkyBOX water slide formerly located in Hurricane Harbor. SBNO for the 2023 and 2024 seasons. The ride was removed in February of 2025.
Kontiki	1999	2023	24	A Flying Bobs attraction formerly located in Rockville. The ride was removed prior to the 2024 season.
Typhoon	2005	2023	18	A water slide formerly located in Hurricane Harbor. SBNO for the 2024 season. The ride was removed in February of 2025.
Tomahawk	1999	2024	25	HUSS Frisbee formerly located in Crackaxle Canyon. Reaches heights of 78 feet. The ride was removed ahead of the 2025 season.

== Six Flags Hurricane Harbor ==
Six Flags Hurricane Harbor
- Interactive map of Six Flags Hurricane Harbor
- Owner: Six Flags

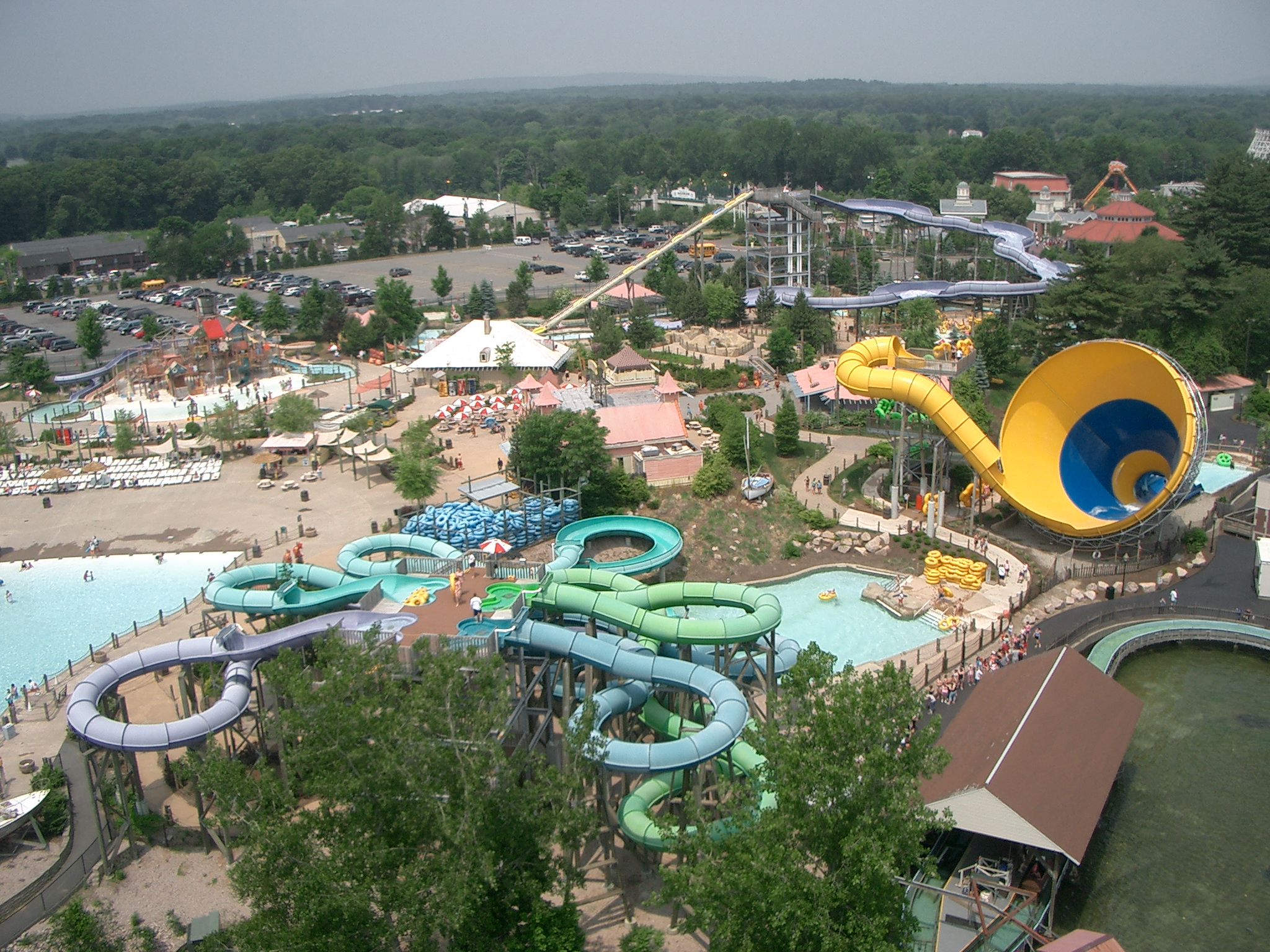
Overview of Hurricane Harbor

Hurricane Harbor is a water park located within Six Flags New England. The waterpark opened in 1998 as Island Kingdom and was rebranded Hurricane Harbor in 2003. It features a number of family-oriented rides as well as thrill rides. For the 2020 season, Bonzai Beach is being expanded and renamed to Buccaneer Beach. This area is to include a larger bathhouse facility and a new pool.

Ride name	Opened	Manufacturer/Type	Notes
Swiss Family Toboggan	1998	Proslide Technology Inc. "Mammoth" family raft ride	
Adventure River	1998	Lazy river	
Big Kahuna	1998	Proslide Technology Inc. "Pipeline"	4 enclosed tube slides.
Cannonball Falls	1998	Proslide Technology Inc. "Speed Zone"	3 speed slides.
Hook's Lagoon	1998	SCS Interactive "Discovery Treehouse" with Proslide Technology Inc. "Twisters’ Zone" slides	
Octopus Toddler Slide	1998		Climbing structure for children.
Kiddie Pirate Ship	1998		Fake pirate ship designed for kids to climb on.
Commotion Ocean	1999		A large wave pool.
Shark Attack	1999	Proslide Technology Inc. "Atomic Coasters"	4 half enclosed, half open tube slides.
Tornado	2003	Proslide Technology Inc. Tornado "Rattler"	Funnel-shaped tube slide that uses four-person "cloverleaf" or two-person "whirly wheel" tubes.
Hurricane Bay	2003		Wave pool with family activity area.
Monsoon Lagoon	2003		Family wave pool along with slides and interactive water play area.
Hurricane Falls	2003	6 slide Proslide Technology Inc. Twisters complex	
Geronimo Falls and Zooma Falls	2003	2 Proslide Technology Inc. Mammoths	
Splash Island	2010		Kids area including a wave pool and lazy river. Originally named "Mr. Six's Splash Island" but the prefix was removed after one season.
Rip Tide Cove	2013		Water play area.

== Park entertainment ==
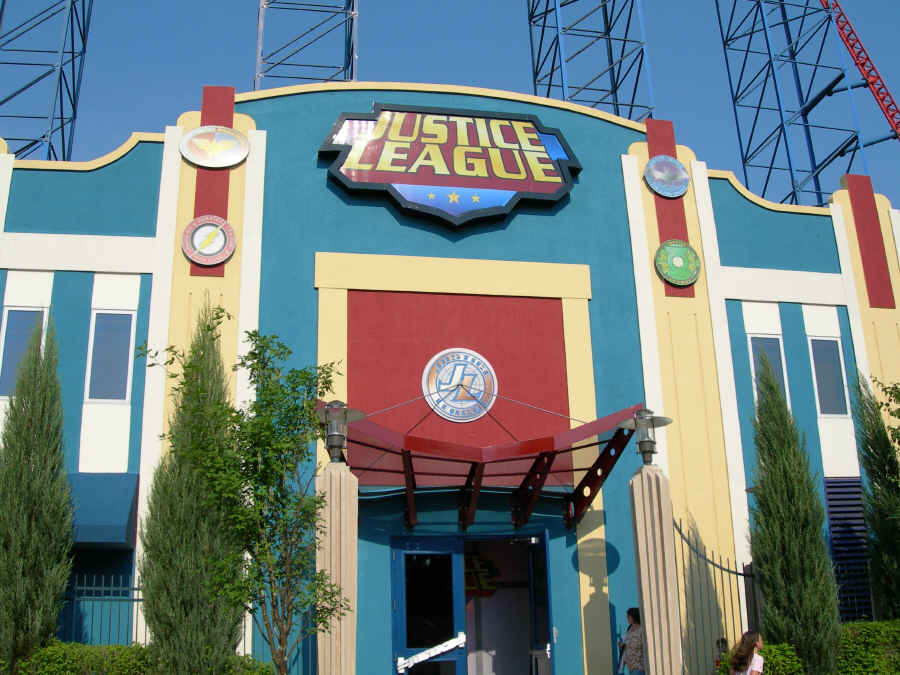
Formerly The Hall of Justice

During the park's branding as a Six Flags in 2000, the Looney Tunes characters were added to the park. The line-up of Looney Tunes characters includes: Bugs Bunny, Daffy Duck, Tweety Bird, Sylvester, Foghorn Leghorn, Porky Pig, Petunia Pig, Wile E. Coyote, Marvin the Martian, Taz, Speedy Gonzales, and Yosemite Sam.

In 2006, the park underwent a massive expansion in the entertainment department when Mark Shapiro took control of Six Flags. With this expansion, Six Flags New England has added Justice League characters, along with the Hall of Justice. In 2007, enemies of the Justice League known as the Legion of Doom came to Six Flags. This addition brought the following characters to the park: Batman, Robin, Aquaman, Wonder Woman, Hawkgirl, Green Lantern, The Flash, The Joker, The Riddler, Sinestro, Cheetah, Lex Luthor and Captain Cold. The Hall of Justice is located in the building where the Jokers Wild Card flat ride used to be, transforming it into a secret lair. Times are posted outside indicating when guests will be able to meet the characters and pose for pictures. However, the Hall of Justice building has recently become the home of Cyborg: Hyper Drive.

The park also formerly featured some of the characters from Mystery Inc, including Scooby-Doo, his best friend Shaggy Rogers and his nephew Scrappy-Doo.

In the 2008 season, the Glow in the Park Parade was introduced. It was the unique brainchild of world-renowned creative director Gary Goddard and featured five custom-designed floats, 65 performers, and more than 35 support staff members and technicians. Each float was adorned with vibrant-multicolor lights that illuminate the park and surrounded the streets with custom-composed cirque-inspired music. The parade featured drummers, puppeteers, singers, dancers, and kinetic stilt walkers to create an unparalleled nighttime spectacular. The parade did not return in the 2009 season, but it did return in 2010. The parade never got to complete its full-season run in 2010. It was canceled in July after new management took over the Six Flags Corporate office.

From 2001 to 2014, Six Flags New England hosted a series of outdoor summer concerts. Additionally, from 2006 to 2013, WKSS hosted their annual Kiss 95.7 Summer Kickoff Concert at the park, and from 2010 to 2013, WKCI-FM hosted KC 101's Ticket to Ride concert.

== Fright Fest ==
During the month of October, the park gets transformed for its annual Halloween festival, Fright Fest. This transformation includes the addition of Halloween decorations to several of its midway areas (making them Haunt Zones with roaming character monsters), several shows and five premium haunted attractions: Nightmares, Terror Tales, Camp Killamore, Slasher Circus 3D and Midnight Mansion. In early 2009, Six Flags New England received an award within the chain for the best Fright Fest of 2008.

== See also ==
- Incidents at Six Flags New England
