= Batgirl Coaster Chase =

Roller coaster at Six Flags Fiesta Texas

- Previously known as Pied Piper (1992-1998), Rollschuhcoaster (1999-2008), Romp Bomp A Stomp (2009-2010), Kiddie Koaster (2011-2019), Streamliner Coaster (2020-2024)
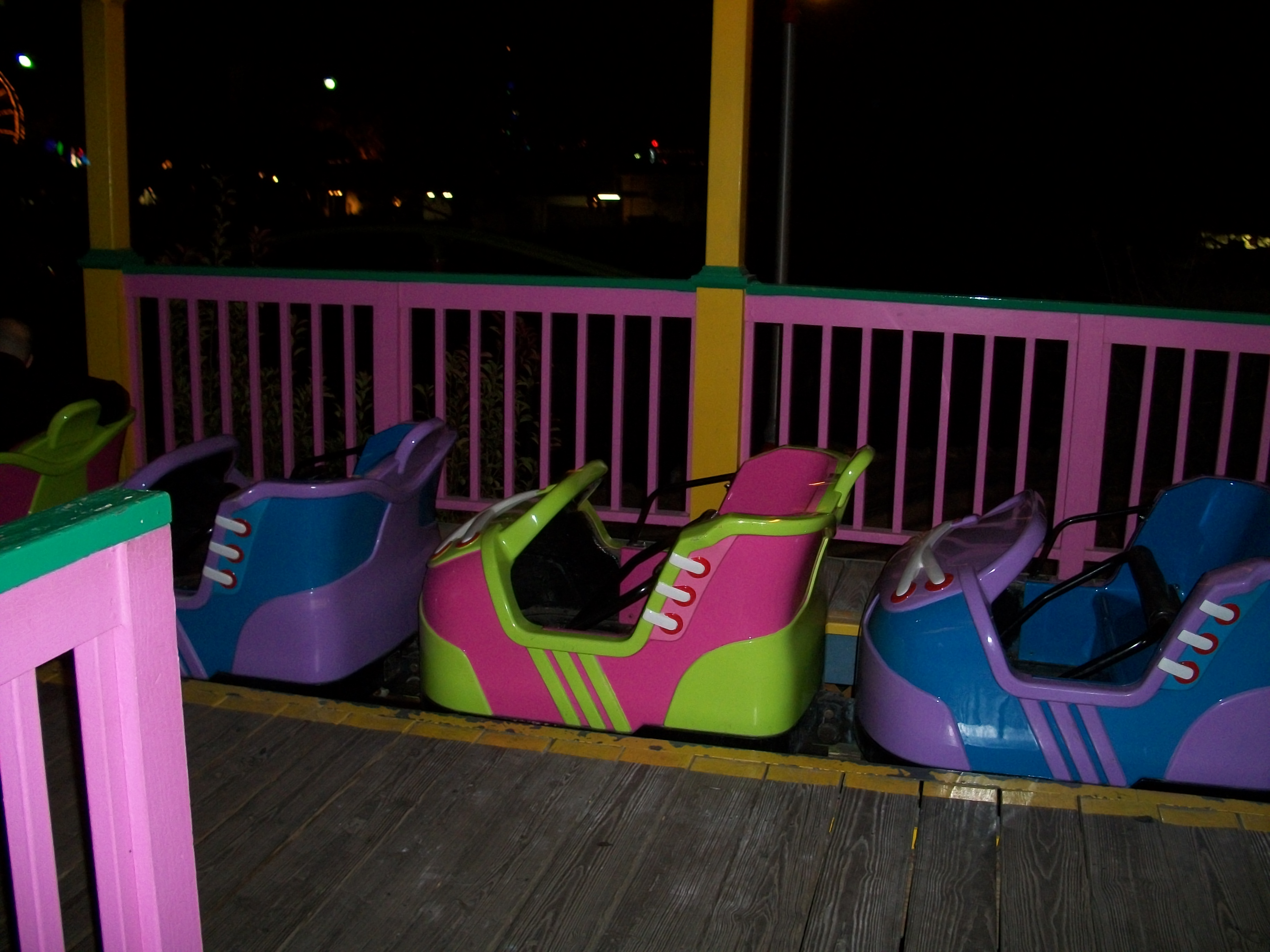

Six Flags Fiesta Texas
- Location: Six Flags Fiesta Texas
- Park section: DC Universe
- Coordinates: 29.5965°N 98.6099°W
- Status: Operating
- Opening date: March 14, 1992

General statistics
- Type: Steel – Junior
- Manufacturer: Vekoma
- Model: Junior Coaster (85m)
- Track layout: Oval
- Length: 278.8 ft (85.0 m)
- Inversions: 0
- Capacity: 670 riders per hour
- Height restriction: 36 in (91 cm)
- Trains: Single train with 5 cars; riders arranged 2 across in a single row for a total of 10 riders per train
- Batgirl Coaster Chase at RCDB

Batgirl Coaster Chase is a junior roller coaster located at Six Flags Fiesta Texas in San Antonio, Texas. Designed by Vekoma, a Dutch manufacturer, the coaster is one of the few original attractions that opened with the park.

Riders board a 10-seater train and go up a short hill before going down and following the track in a simple loop back round to the station in two circuits.

== History ==
Batgirl Coaster Chase was originally named Pied Piper when it opened on March 14, 1992, with the park. In 1999, the roller coaster was renamed to Rollschuhcoaster, when Six Flags came as sole owners of the park.

In 2007, Six Flags released new entertainment and marketing initiatives for their US based parks, such as bringing Wiggles into their lineup. On September 28, 2008, Six Flags Fiesta Texas announced the expansion of Wiggles World, that would enhance the line up for family-oriented rides. Rollschuhcoaster was part of the expansion as the ride got refurbished with a new name, Romp Bomp A Stomp to go along with the theming of the new area.

In November 2010, the company began the process of canceling licensed intellectual property deals they had with various brands including what they had with the Wiggles as the company was emerging itself from bankruptcy at that time. This affected the roller coaster in which, it was renamed in late 2010 as Kiddie Koaster. Ten years later in 2020, the roller coaster went through its fifth name change, to Streamliner Coaster. In 2023, the park announced that its themed area DC Universe will expand into more of Spassburg and Thrill Seeker Park for the 2023 season. The expansion will have the roller coaster to go through another rethemed to fit with the area. In 2024, the roller coaster was rethemed to the DC Comics character, Batgirl.
