= Superman The Ride =

Steel roller coaster

- Previously known as Superman: Ride of Steel (2000–2008); Bizarro (2009–2015)
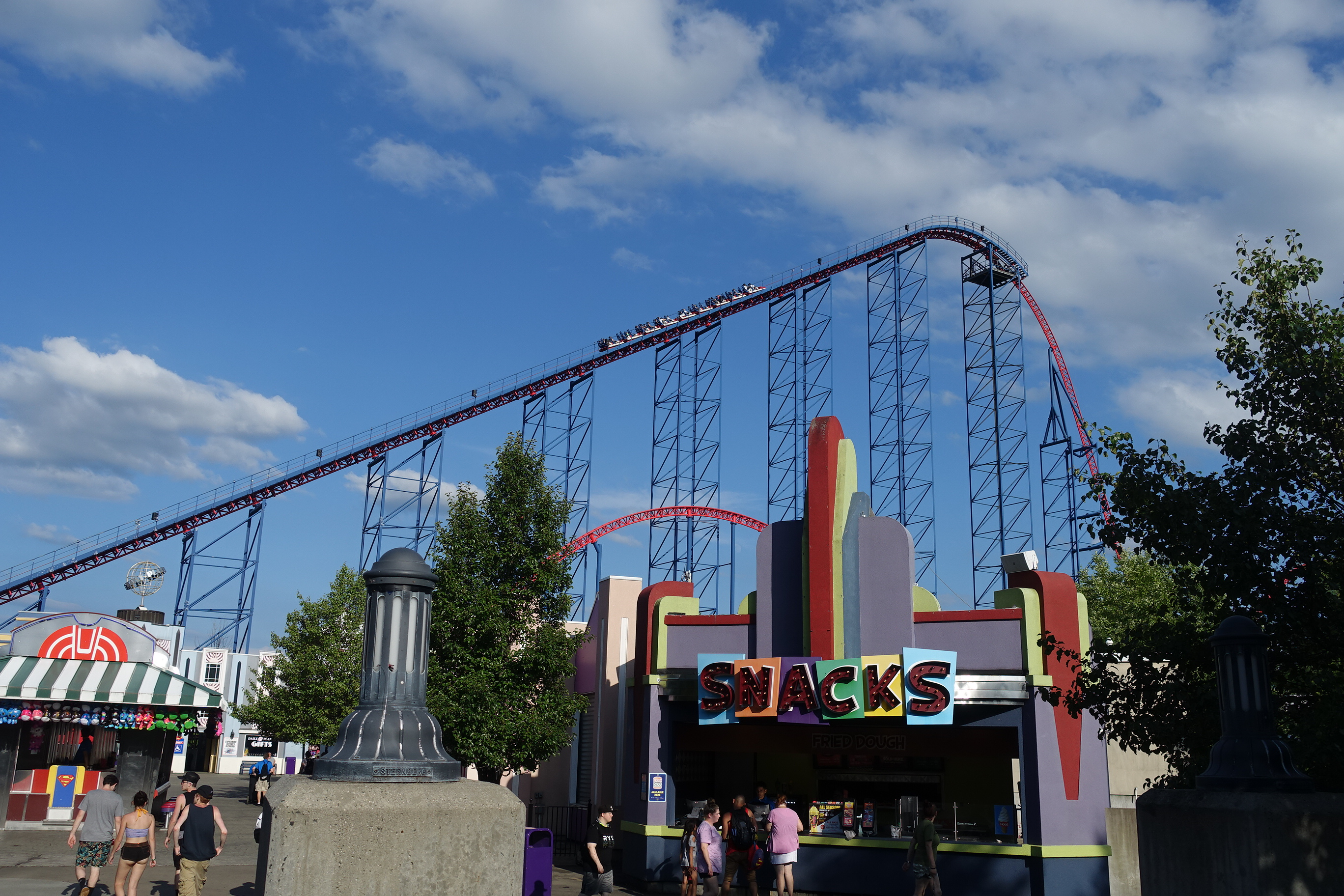

Six Flags New England
- Location: Six Flags New England
- Park section: DC Universe
- Coordinates: 42°02′19″N 72°36′41″W
- Status: Operating
- Opening date: May 5, 2000
- Cost: Approx: $12,000,000
- Replaced: Riverside Park Speedway

General statistics
- Type: Steel
- Manufacturer: Intamin
- Designer: Werner Stengel
- Model: Mega Coaster
- Track layout: Out and Back; Twister
- Lift/launch system: Chain lift hill
- Height: 208 ft (63 m)
- Drop: 221 ft (67 m)
- Length: 5,400 ft (1,600 m)
- Speed: 77 mph (124 km/h)
- Inversions: 0
- Duration: 2:35
- Max vertical angle: 72°
- Capacity: 1300 riders per hour
- G-force: 3.6
- Height restriction: 54–76 in (137–193 cm)
- Trains: 2 trains with 9 cars; riders arranged 2 across in 2 rows for a total of 36 riders per train
- Fast Lane available
- Superman The Ride at RCDB

Superman The Ride (formerly Bizarro and Superman – Ride of Steel) is a steel roller coaster at Six Flags New England in Agawam, Massachusetts, United States. Built by Swiss manufacturer Intamin, the hypercoaster opened to the public as Superman – Ride of Steel in 2000. It features a 208-foot (63 m) lift hill, a 221-foot (67 m) drop, and a maximum speed of 77 mph (124 km/h). In 2009, the park changed the name to Bizarro, named after a DC Comics character portrayed as the antithesis of Superman. In accordance with the theme change, the coaster's track and supports were repainted with a purple and dark blue color scheme, and other special effects were added. In 2016, the Six Flags reverted to the original theme, but instead of restoring the name, it was changed to Superman The Ride. A virtual reality feature was added the same year, creating an optional 3D experience for passengers, but it was removed prior to the 2017 season.

Superman The Ride has been well received, consistently holding a high ranking among steel roller coasters in the annual Golden Ticket Awards published by Amusement Today. The ride has topped the list five times since its debut. It has also weathered criticism from two serious accidents – one resulting in a passenger's death – that occurred early in its tenure and resulted in several safety modifications.

== History ==
Prior to the 2000 season, Six Flags New England was known as Riverside Park. Six Flags purchased the park and added their own DC Comics theming. The site on which Superman The Ride operates is the former site of the Riverside Park Speedway. The Speedway was closed and demolished after the 1999 season to make room for a new themed area, DC Universe (known as DC Superhero Adventure until 2020). As part of the $40 million expansion, the park built Superman: Ride of Steel. A year before the Speedway's demolition, Six Flags had worked with Swiss manufacturer Intamin to build and design the ride. The final track piece of Superman was installed on March 27, 2000, about 40 days before opening day. The ride officially opened on May 5, 2000 as the tallest and longest roller coaster on the East Coast of the United States. The entrance and station were themed to Superman with Superman logos and a picture of him located above the entrance. The second tunnel also had a mist effect.

=== 2009 theme change ===
Superman: Ride of Steel was re-themed as Bizarro at the start of the 2009 season. Six Flags had to work with the Zoning Board of Appeals to file a permit for the new effects because the ride sits on the Connecticut River floodplain. Although no changes were made to the track layout, a new theme highlighting Superman's evil clone, Bizarro, was added. The track was repainted purple with dark blue supports, and multiple special effects were added; including building structures that give riders the impression of speeding through a city, rings in the shape of Bizarro's S shield that the train passes through, and flame effects. The two trains were repainted purple with new on-board audio. Six Flags introduced an "alternate reality game" to market the newly themed ride. Bizarro opened on May 22, 2009, at the start of Memorial Day weekend. Since the transformation, some of the effects have been removed. The fire effects were relocated to the New Texas Giant at Six Flags Over Texas.

=== 2016 theme change and VR experience ===
On September 3, 2015, it was announced that Bizarro's theme would be restored to Superman The Ride for the 2016 season. On March 3, 2016, Six Flags announced that the ride would be one of several rides at various Six Flags parks to feature a VR system. Riders had the option of wearing a Samsung Gear VR headset, powered by Oculus to create a 360-degree, 3D experience while riding. It was themed to Superman saving a city from Lex Luthor's Lex Bots who are causing chaos with an anti-gravity ray. This theming also came to the Superman: Krypton Coaster at Six Flags Fiesta Texas and Superman - Ride of Steel at Six Flags America. Starting July 25, 2016, the Virtual Reality experience was offered during the afternoons. VR was removed for the 2017 season.

== Ride experience ==
=== Track layout ===
After departing from the station, the train climbs the 208-foot (63 m)-tall chain lift hill while the title theme from Superman: The Movie plays. To the left of the lift hill is the Connecticut River, which is parallel to much of the coaster. After reaching the top, the train drops 221 feet (67 m) into a fogged headchopper tunnel. The ride reaches its top speed of 77 miles per hour (124 km/h). After the train exits the tunnel, it climbs a second hill before dropping down into a 120 degree overbanked turn to the right. Riders then ride through cutouts of buildings and climb the third and fourth major hills. The third hill is where the on-ride photo is taken. After the fourth hill, the train drops through Superman's S shields. Riders crest a small hill, turning right into a clockwise helix, known as the spaghetti bowl. It then jumps over a bunny hill into a counter-clockwise helix. The train makes a right turn drop into a fogged tunnel followed by three bunny hills before banking right into the station.

=== Trains ===
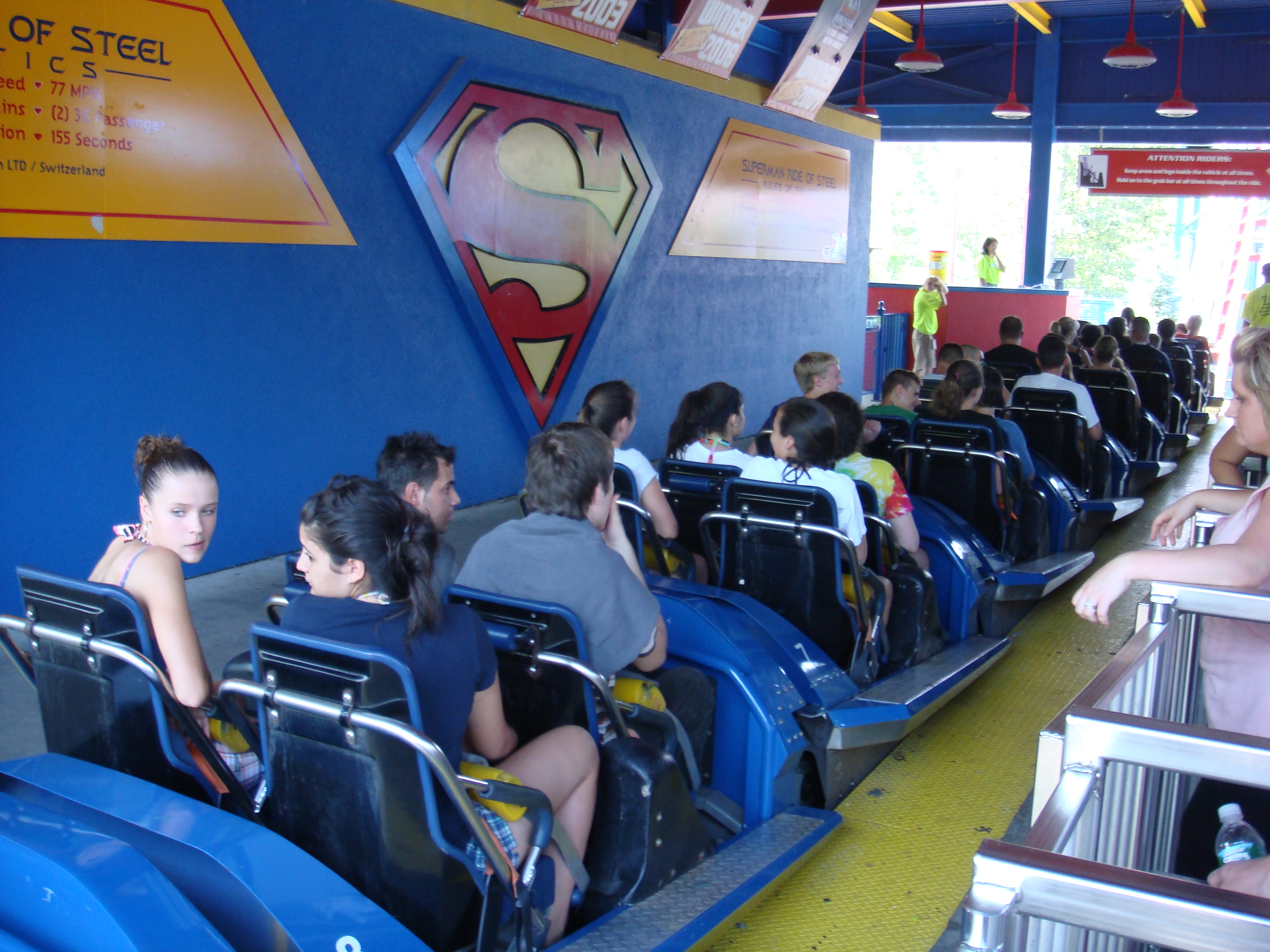
Train in the station prior to the theme change in 2009

The roller coaster features two fiberglass trains with stadium-style seating. Each train has nine cars with two rows of paired seats per car. When the ride was re-themed in 2009, onboard audio was added to the trains, with each seat having speakers mounted in the headrests. On each train, the two rear seats of the fifth car were removed to house equipment for the on-board audio. This reduced the capacity of the trains from 36 to 34. Upon reopening following the change, a recording of various film quotes played while the train was in motion, ending with a loop of Bizarro and several other people chanting his name. Eventually, the audio track was switched to a compilation of clips from different rock songs, although the ending portion of the audio loop was kept due to popular demand. While on the final brake run waiting to return to the loading station, riders hear Bizarro chanting his name and "Bizarro #1". The new trains paint scheme was changed from blue and red to purple. Each seat originally had an individual hydraulic T-shaped lap bar restraints, but after several safety modifications, the restraints now consist of two metal bars on each side.

When Bizarro was rethemed to Superman The Ride, the on-board audio was removed from both of the trains. One train was painted red and the other blue. The audio box remained in the fifth car of each train. For the 2025 season, the audio box was removed and replaced with seats, increasing the capacity from 34 to 36 riders per train.

=== Track ===
The steel track is 5,400 feet (1,600 m) in length and the height of the lift is approximately 208 feet (63 m). The track was originally painted red with blue supports, to fit the theme of Superman. In 2009, after the re-theme to Bizarro, the track was repainted purple while the supports were painted a darker shade of blue. In 2016, the track and supports were repainted to their original colors but using more vibrant shades.

== Accidents and incidents ==
On August 6, 2001, one of the trains failed to stop at the ride's brake run, colliding with the other train in the loading station. 22 people were sent to hospitals, without any major injuries. The ride reopened on August 18, 2001.

On May 1, 2004, a 55-year-old man was thrown from the coaster during the last turn and was killed. An investigation later showed that the ride attendant failed to properly check and secure the rider's seat restraint, as the rider's large girth size was a factor in the T-bar restraint's ability to close. The victim's family claimed that due to his various medical conditions, such as cerebral palsy, he shouldn't have been allowed to ride. The park responded by saying the federal Americans with Disabilities Act forbids them from denying rides to persons with disabilities if the person is able to board without assistance.

=== Safety modifications ===
Superman The Ride has undergone numerous safety upgrades. After the 2001 incident, the PVC airlines were replaced with steel reinforced air hoses to prevent a similar accident from occurring. After the 2004 incident, metal bars were installed on both sides of the "T-bar" restraint, encasing the rider's legs. Shin restraints were added to the lower portion of the restraint, preventing riders' feet from leaving the car. In addition, all of the seat belts on both 36-passenger trains were replaced with ones at a consistent length, as well as a "go or no go" belt for each seat and T-bar restraint. The "go or no-go" belt ensured the T-bar restraint was in an effective position before leaving the station. During the 2009 rebranding, new trains were deployed with new restraints added. The new lap bars eliminated the center pole, leaving only the exterior poles. New seat belts provided more strength and were less likely to come undone unintentionally.

== Rankings ==
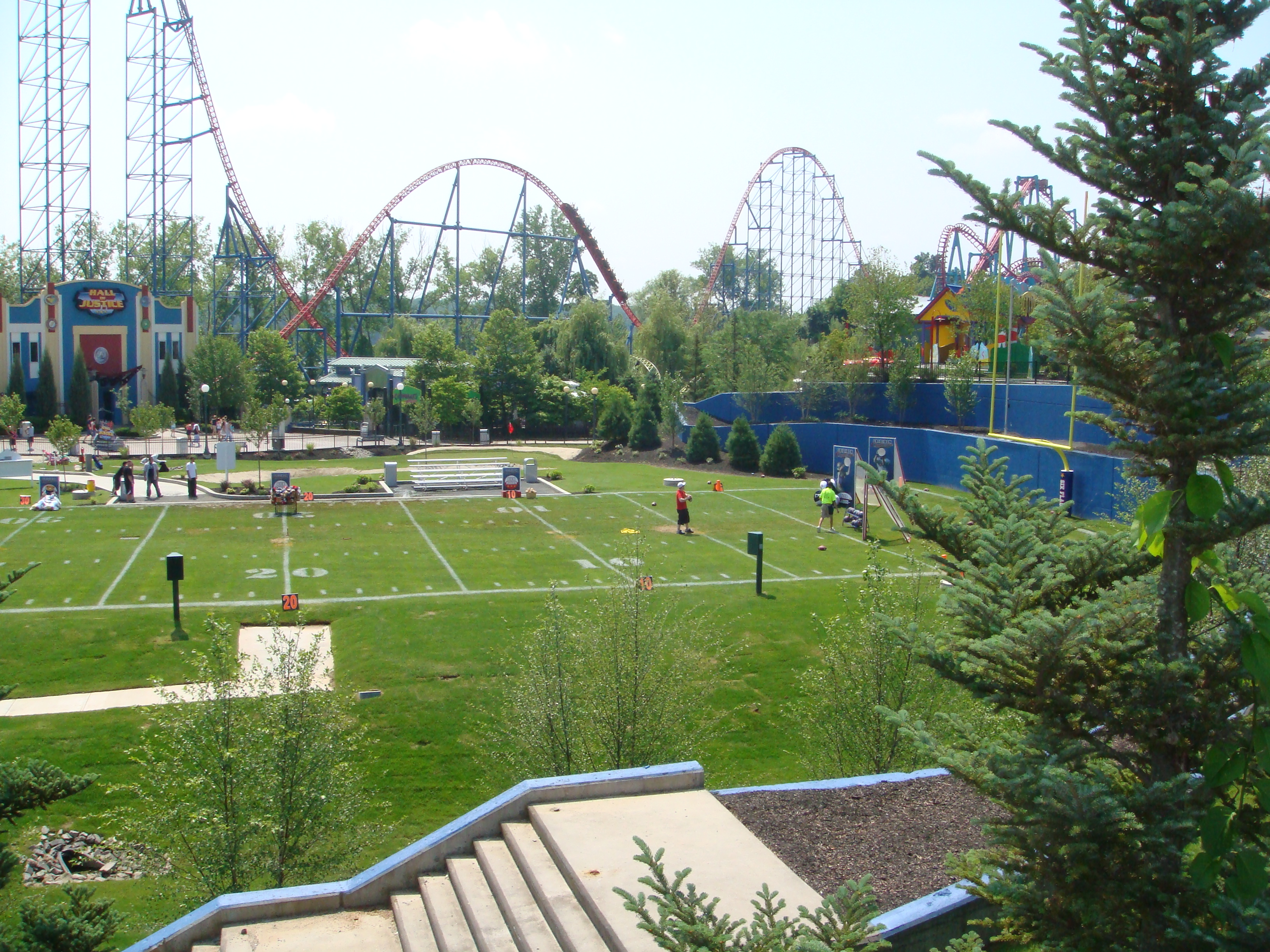
Superman The Ride, as Superman: Ride of Steel, viewed from in front of a football field

Superman The Ride, along with Millennium Force, held the top two spots in the Golden Ticket Awards poll every year from 2001 to 2015. Superman The Ride is praised by the roller coaster community, and the ride is noted for its smoothness and large amount of airtime.

Golden Ticket Awards: Top steel Roller Coasters
Year									1998	1999
Ranking									–	–
Year	2000	2001	2002	2003	2004	2005	2006	2007	2008	2009
Ranking	10	2	2	1	2	2	1	1	1	1
Year	2010	2011	2012	2013	2014	2015	2016	2017	2018	2019
Ranking	2	2	2	2	2	2	3	3	5	4
Year	2020	2021	2022	2023	2024	2025	2026			
Ranking	N/A	4	7	7	12	16	17			

NAPHA Survey: Favorite Steel Roller Coaster
Year	2005	2006	2007	2008
Ranking	3	4	2	2
