= Thunderbolt (Six Flags New England) =

Wooden roller coaster

- Previously known as Cyclone (1941-1963)
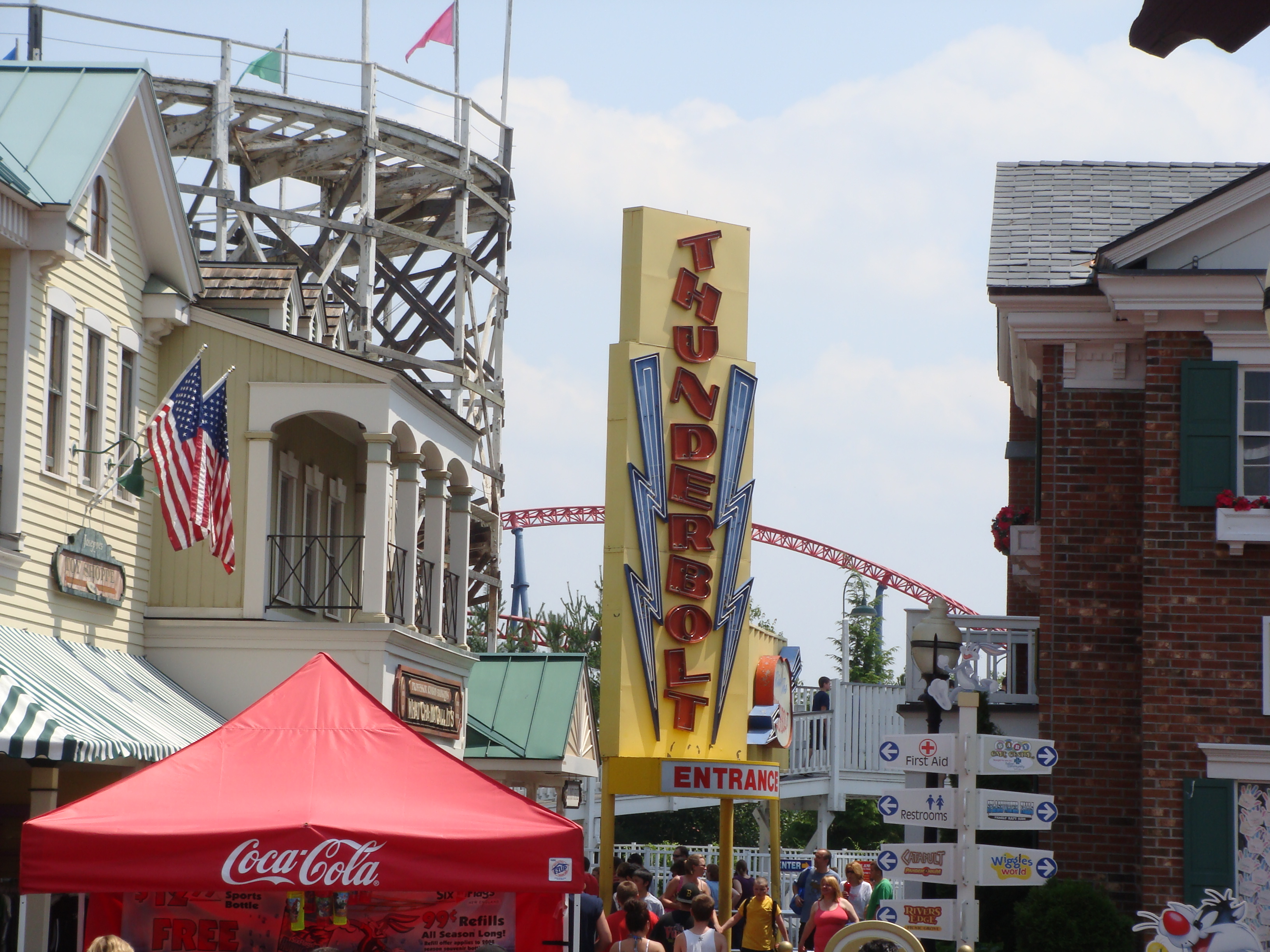
- Ride Entrance

Six Flags New England
- Location: Six Flags New England
- Coordinates: 42°2′20″N 72°36′48″W
- Status: Operating
- Opening date: 1941

General statistics
- Type: Wood
- Manufacturer: Joseph E. Drambour
- Designer: Harry C. Baker, Harry G Traver
- Track layout: Figure Eight
- Height: 70 ft (21 m)
- Length: 2,600 ft (790 m)
- Speed: 40 mph (64 km/h)
- Inversions: 0
- Duration: 1:00
- Height restriction: 48 in (122 cm)
- Thunderbolt at RCDB

Thunderbolt is a wooden roller coaster located at Six Flags New England. Opened in 1941, it was designed by Harry Baker and Harry Traver, and built by Joseph Drambour. Thunderbolt is the oldest roller coaster at Six Flags New England. It is also the second oldest roller coaster in any Six Flags park (the Wild One at Six Flags America was built in 1917, but it was relocated from Paragon Park and has only been at Six Flags America since 1986). Each PTC train has 4 cars, and an individual lap bar and seatbelt for each person. An attendant has to manually unlock each car's lap bars by stepping on and pushing down a release bar at the front of each car. Thunderbolt was dedicated an ACE Coaster Landmark on August 2, 2008.

== History ==
The track, train and plans for Thunderbolt were purchased by park owner Edward Carroll Sr. from the 1939 New York World's Fair. When it opened in 1941, it was called Cyclone; the ride was renamed Thunderbolt in 1964.
