= Bradley and Kaye Amusement Park Rides =

Defunct amusement ride company

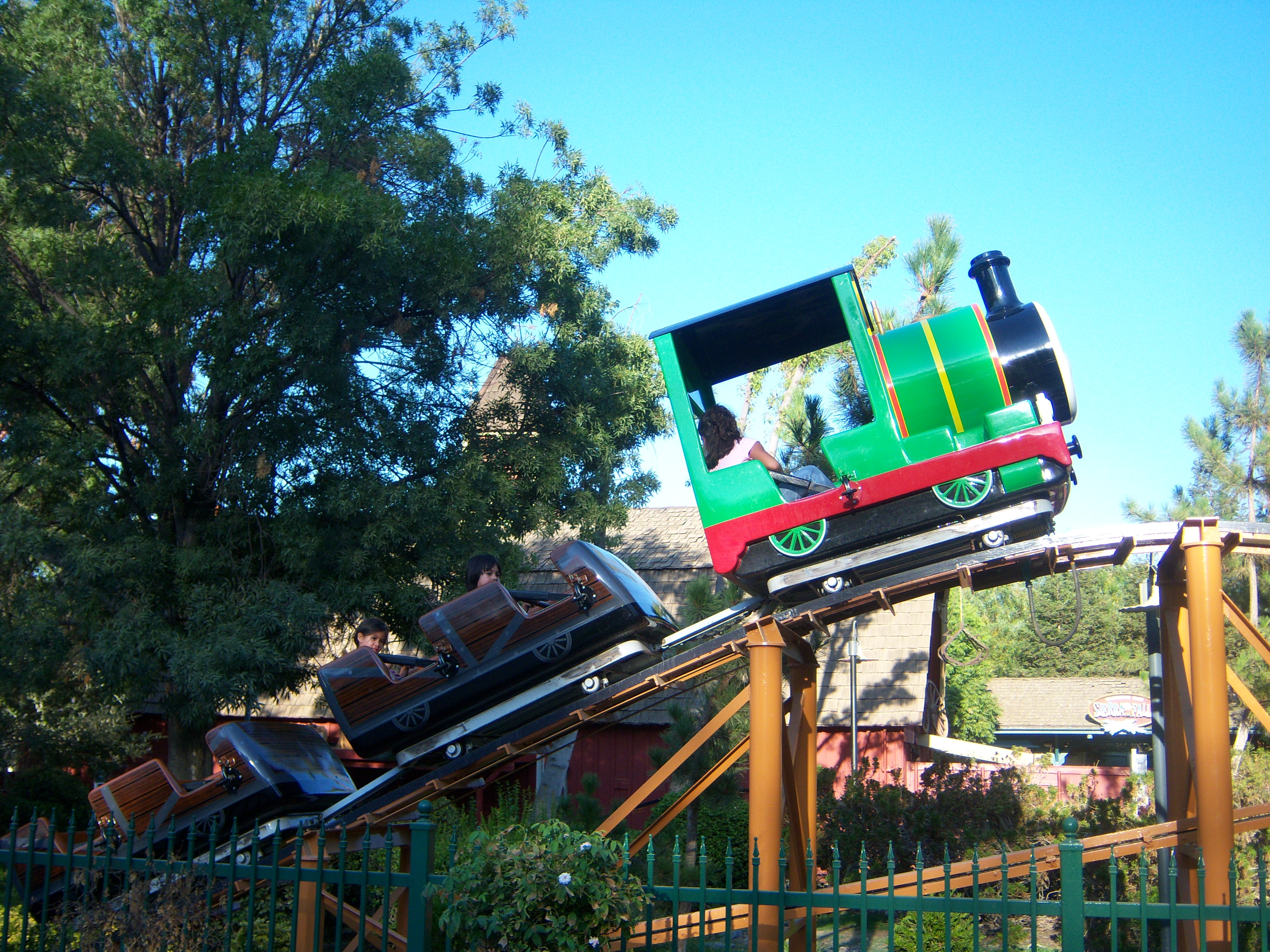
- Magic Flyer at Six Flags Magic Mountain
- Founded: 1945; 81 years ago
- Defunct: 1986; 40 years ago
- Products: Rollercoasters

Bradley and Kaye is a defunct amusement ride company. Created in 1945 at Los Angeles, they owned Beverly Park. They specialized in small, child-centered rollercoasters.
