= Gold Rusher =

Roller coaster in Valencia, California

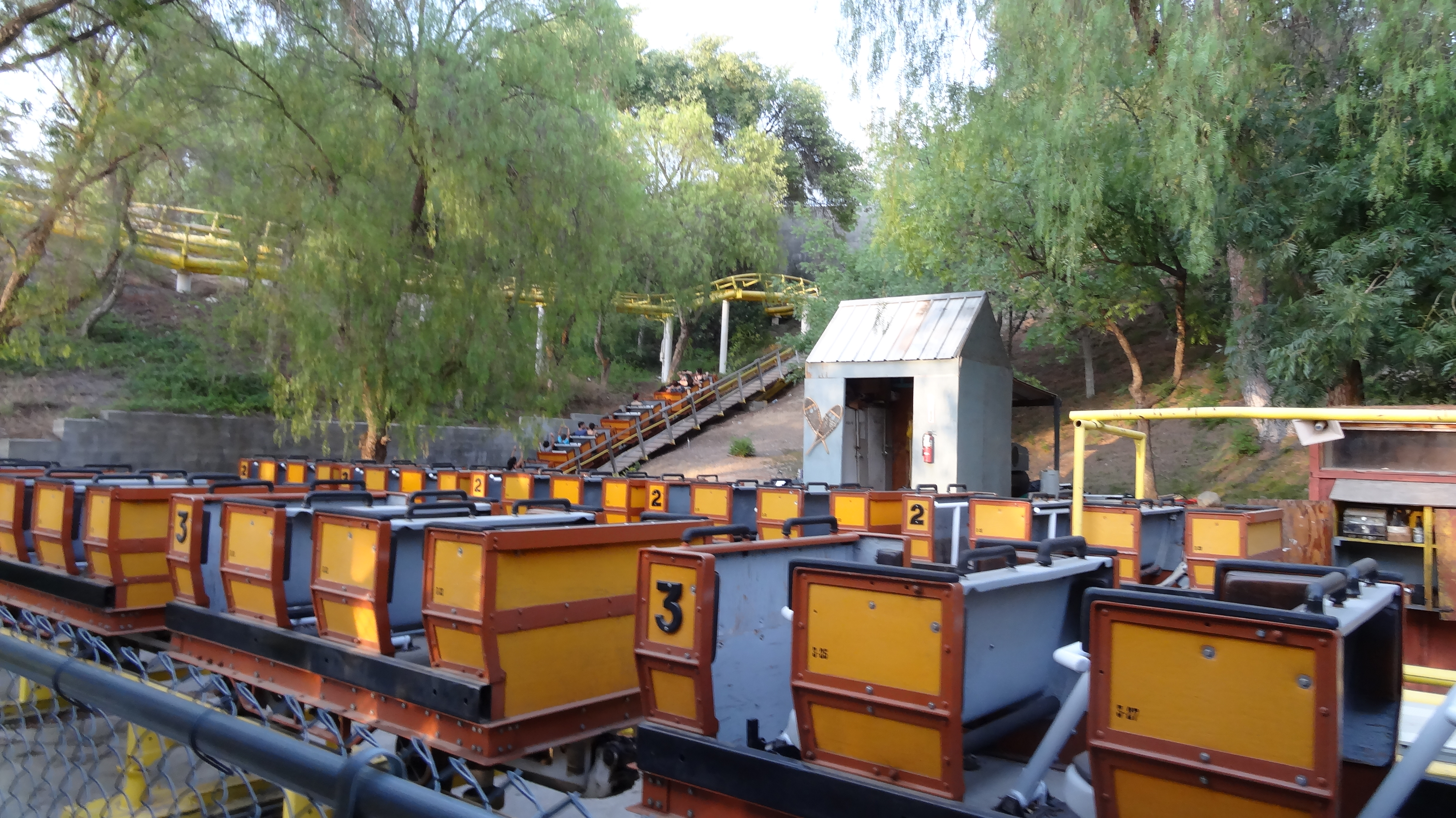
- Gold Rusher

Six Flags Magic Mountain
- Location: Six Flags Magic Mountain
- Park section: Boardwalk
- Coordinates: 34°25′24.6″N 118°35′56″W
- Status: Operating
- Opening date: May 29, 1971; 54 years ago
- Cost: $1,200,000

General statistics
- Type: Steel
- Manufacturer: Arrow Dynamics
- Model: Mine Train
- Lift/launch system: Chain lift hill
- Height: 70 ft (21 m)
- Length: 2,590 ft (790 m)
- Speed: 35 mph (56 km/h)
- Inversions: 0
- Duration: 2:30
- Capacity: 1,750 riders per hour
- Trains: 4 trains with 5 cars. Riders are arranged 2 across in 3 rows for a total of 30 riders per train.
- Fast Lane available
- Gold Rusher at RCDB

Gold Rusher is a roller coaster at Six Flags Magic Mountain. Made in 1971, it was the oldest coaster at the park besides Magic Flyer. This coaster was made by Arrow Development and has no inversions.
