= West Coast Racers =

Roller coaster at Six Flags Magic Mountain

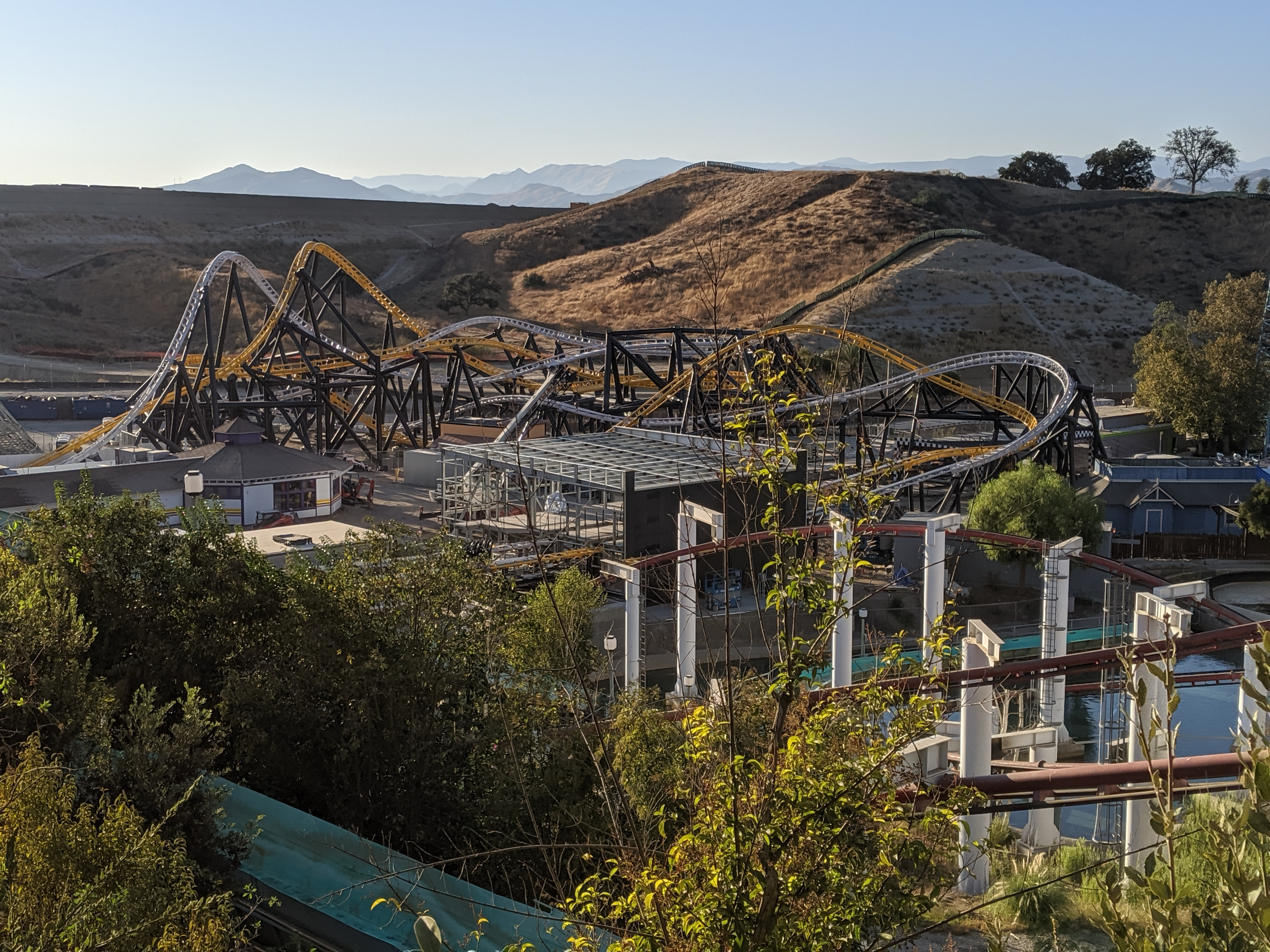

Six Flags Magic Mountain
- Location: Six Flags Magic Mountain
- Park section: The Underground
- Coordinates: 34.4217°N 118.5992°W
- Status: Operating
- Soft opening date: December 21, 2019
- Opening date: January 9, 2020

General statistics
- Type: Steel – Launched
- Manufacturer: Premier Rides
- Model: Custom
- Lift/launch system: LSM launch
- Height: 67 ft (20 m)
- Length: 4,000 ft (1,200 m)
- Speed: 55 mph (89 km/h)
- Inversions: 4
- Duration: 3:00
- Height restriction: 54 in (137 cm)
- Trains: 3 trains with 2 cars. Riders are arranged 2 across in 3 rows for a total of 12 riders per train.
- Fast Lane available
- West Coast Racers at RCDB

West Coast Racers is a dueling steel roller coaster located at Six Flags Magic Mountain theme park in Valencia, California. Manufactured by Premier Rides, the ride is a collaboration between West Coast Customs and Six Flags that was promoted as the world's first launch version of a racing roller coaster. After multiple delays and missing the 2019 summer season, the ride eventually debuted on December 21, 2019, in a series of preview events spanning several weeks. It officially opened to the public on January 9, 2020. West Coast Racers is located in a newly-themed section of the park named The Underground, which replaced the former Cyclone Bay.

== History ==
Six Flags Magic Mountain revealed West Coast Racers during a media event held at the park on August 29, 2018, along with a press release the following day. Park president Neal Thurman and West Coast Customs Founder and CEO Ryan Friedlinghaus announced their partnership in the design of the roller coaster, which was touted as having a record-breaking four magnetic launches. It would also feature four inversions – three zero-g rolls and one zero-g stall – along with 30 train interactions, which includes 14 track crossings and one "high-five" element across two laps around the course. The coaster would reach a maximum speed of 55 mph (89 km/h) and feature a number of airtime hills and overbanked turns that will occur side-by-side. West Coast Racers was originally marketed as the park's 20th coaster, but with the planned removal of Green Lantern: First Flight after the 2019 season, the park's total number of coasters remained at 19.

Construction began months behind schedule in May 2019 following a delayed delivery of finished track. The first pieces arrived reportedly later than expected in February 2019. Six Flags did not release an expected opening date, but Theme Park Insider estimated fall 2019 based on the delayed start. A construction update in July 2019 showed a significant amount of work left to complete. In October 2019, a writer for USA Today said, "Speaking of Magic Mountain, the Los Angeles-area park has not revealed anything new for 2020. It still has yet to debut West Coast Racers..."

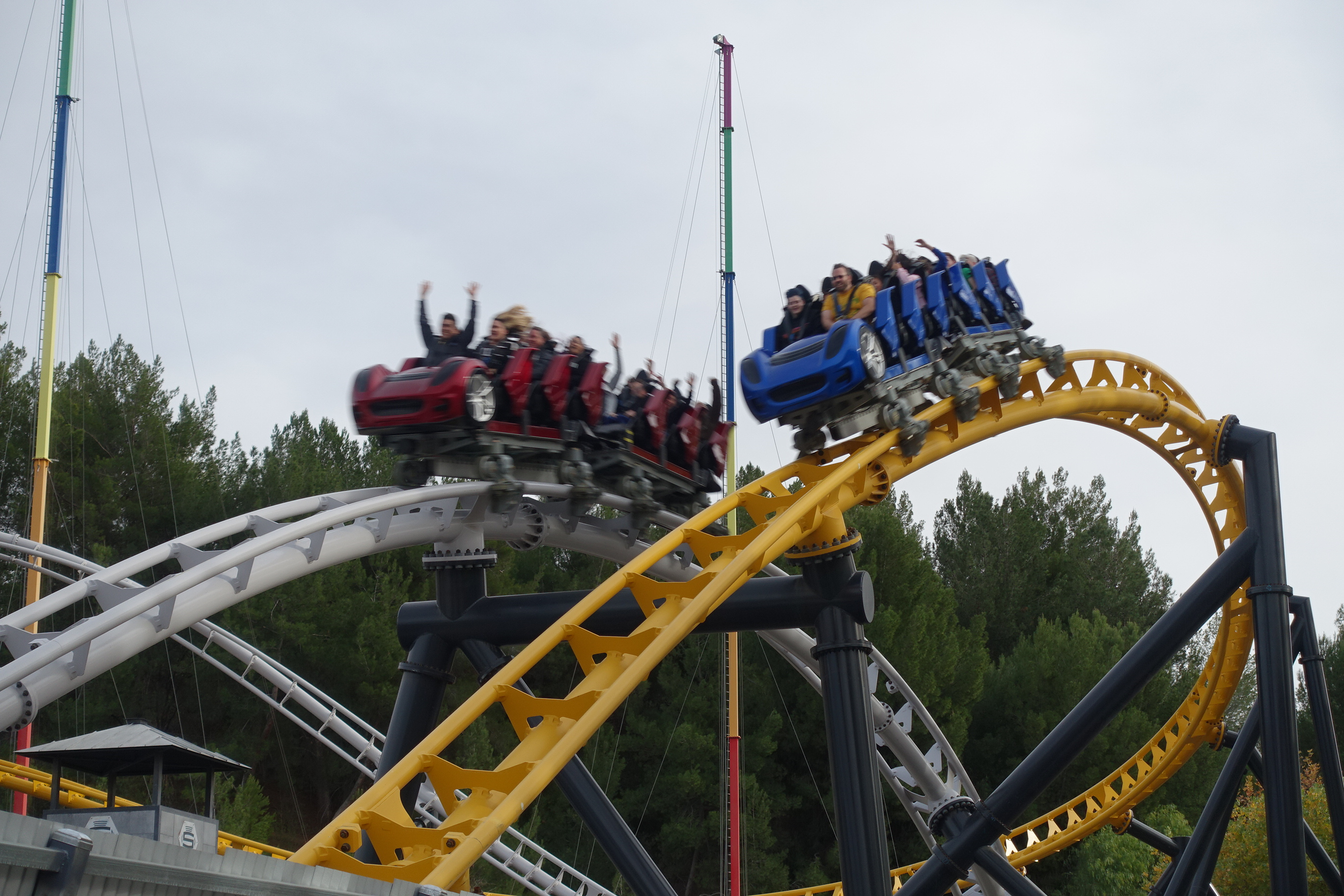
Two trains race to the end

On December 12, 2019, it was announced West Coast Racers would operate during a series of preview events beginning on December 21, 2019. Access was given first to guests with select membership status, and on December 23, 2019, access was given to season pass holders, along with guests who purchased either a West Coast Racers t-shirt or the park's flash pass. The ride officially opened to the general public on January 9, 2020.

== Ride experience ==
A pair of two-car trains, each holding a total of 12 riders, launch simultaneously from the station. They interact over thirty times throughout the course of the track, reaching a maximum speed of 55 mph (89 km/h) as the two trains cross the finish line. One pulls back into the station, while the other pulls into a replica of the West Coast Customs shop to listen to a narration given by Ryan Friedlinghaus. Both cars launch again and repeat the course for a second time, producing a ride duration of approximately three minutes. Each side is a different color, one being white and the other yellow, switching halfway through.
