= Sky Tower (Six Flags Magic Mountain) =

Former observation tower

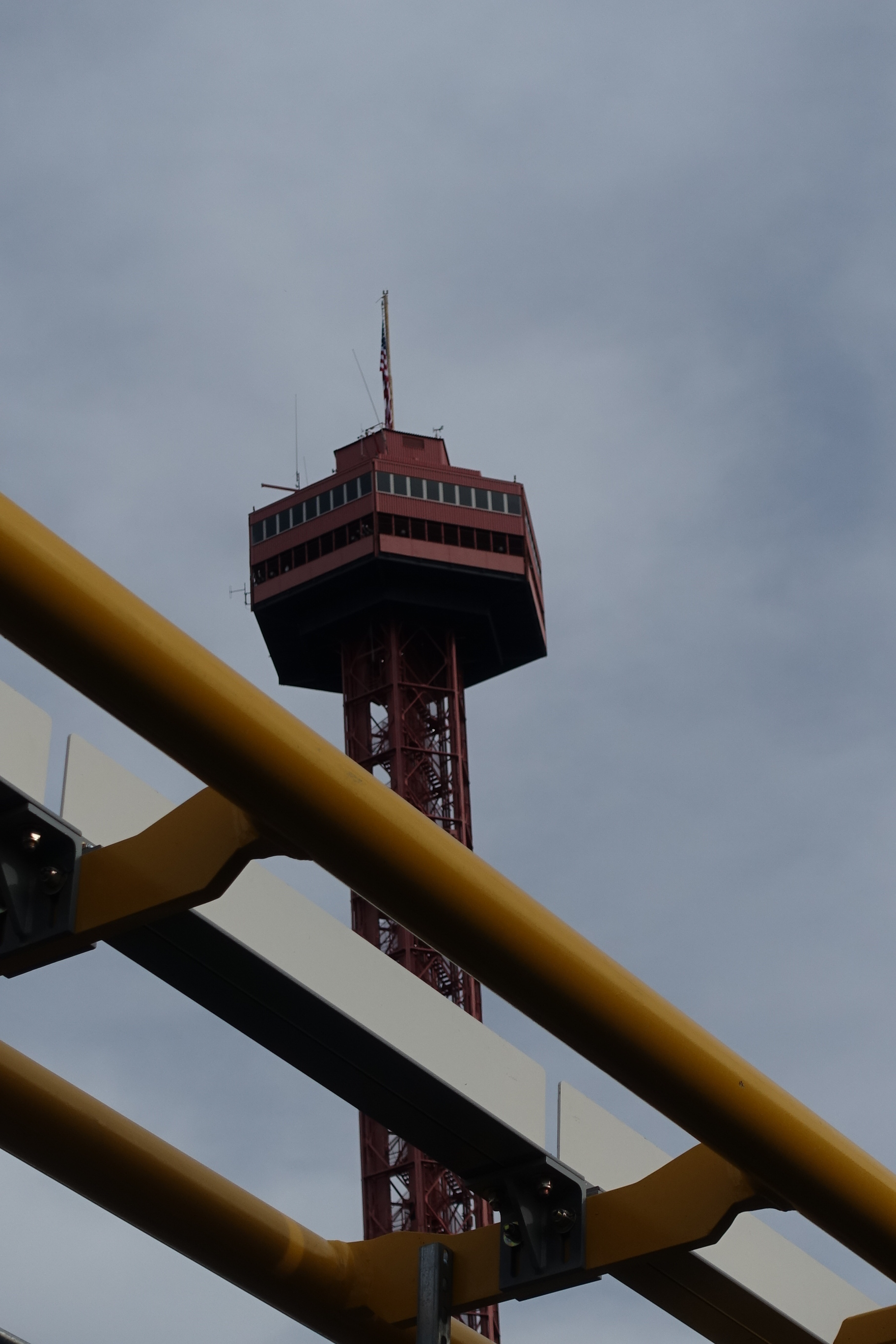
- The tower in 2019

Six Flags Magic Mountain
- Area: Samurai Summit
- Status: Closed
- Cost: $800,000
- Opening date: 1971
- Closing date: 2014

Ride statistics
- Attraction type: Observation Tower
- Manufacturer: Intamin
- Model: Hexagonal Tower
- Height: 385 ft (117 m)
- Capacity: 2000 riders per hour
- Vehicles: 2
- Riders per vehicle: 50

Sky Tower is a 385-foot-tall (117 m) observation tower at Six Flags Magic Mountain in Valencia, California, United States. The tower closed in 2014.

== History ==
Construction for the Sky Tower started in October 1970, one year prior to Magic Mountain's opening. Aggressive Erectors & Bridgemen Inc. installed the ride, along with other opening day attractions. The ride opened in 1971, the same year the park opened. The tower was built by Intamin AG, as a Hexagonal Tower. The tower is made of 460-tons of steel, has two-observation decks and a red-paint scheme. The tower was also designed to withstand strong 100 MPH winds.

The tower opened with a yellow paint scheme, but the tower later a multi-colored rainbow-paint scheme and a white paint scheme, but was then later repainted to its current red-paint scheme.

From 1977-1978, the tower received a sponsorship from Western Airlines. Metal plates with the airline's "W" logo were welded to the sides of the tower. These plates were later used for promotion of Tatsu, with the ride's logo posted on them.

In 2008, the Sky Tower received the "Magic of the Mountain" museum at the top floor of the tower. An attraction that contained memorabilia throughout the parks history including old television commercials, old park maps, old photographs, models, and equipment saved from past/defunct rides. Some items included a car from Colossus (Six Flags) and a test seat for Scream (roller coaster) in its original purple, blue, and yellow colors.

During the Holiday in the Park season, the Sky Tower is decorated as a Christmas Tree.

In 2023, the "Sky Tower Challenge" was hosted by the Santa Clarita Sheriff and sponsored by LoanDepot. Groups of first responders raced up the tower's stairs to win.

== Closure ==
Sometime in 2000, the tower closed for an unknown reason. However, it reopened with the opening of Tatsu in 2006.

Sky Tower permanently closed in 2014.

In August 2020, while the park was closed during the COVID-19 lockdown, a pair of local teenagers broke into the park, and climbed up the tower to the observation deck, spraying the inside of the observation deck with fire extinguishers, hanging from the edge, pouring gallons of paint on the midways, and tossing objects to the ground 30 stories below. They were arrested on August 28 on suspicion of felony vandalism costing more than $3,000.
