= Magic Flyer =

Steel roller coaster

- Previously known as Little Dipper (1941-1971); Clown Coaster (1971-1984); Wile E. Coyote Coaster (1985-1998); Goliath Jr. (2001-2007); Percy's Railway (2008-2010)
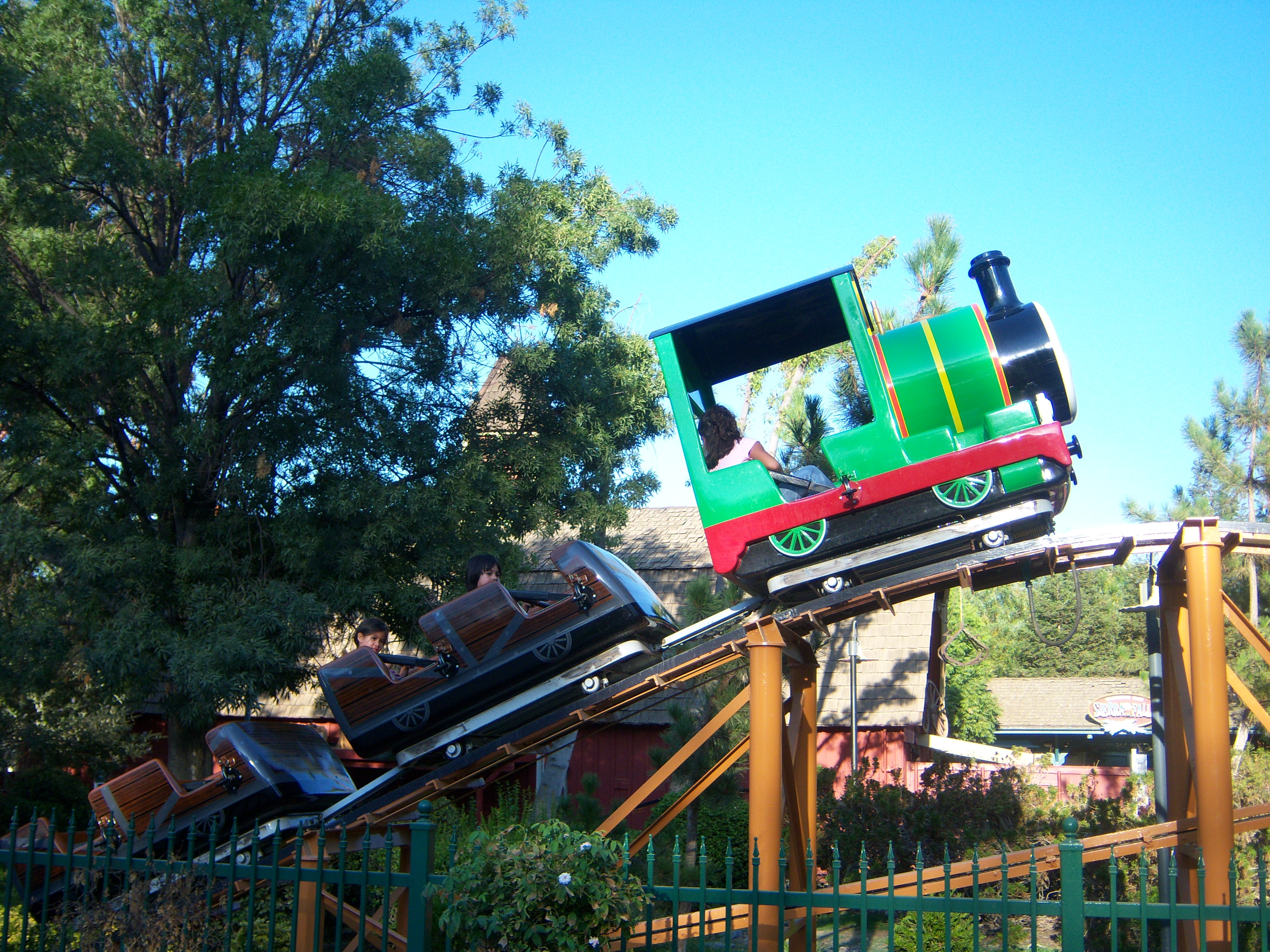
- Magic Flyer, when it was known as Percy's Railway.

Six Flags Magic Mountain
- Park section: Whistlestop Park
- Coordinates: 34.424861°N 118.595918°W
- Status: Removed
- Opening date: May 29, 1971
- Closing date: January 2026

Beverly Park
- Coordinates: 34°07′18″N 118°25′05″W
- Status: Removed
- Opening date: 1946 or later
- Closing date: 1970

General statistics
- Type: Steel – Kiddie
- Manufacturer: Bradley and Kaye
- Designer: Chance Rides
- Model: Little Dipper
- Track layout: Oval
- Lift/launch system: Chain lift hill
- Height: 10 ft (3.0 m)
- Length: 350 ft (110 m)
- Speed: 10 mph (16 km/h)
- Inversions: 0
- Duration: 0:30
- Max vertical angle: 1°
- Capacity: 360 riders per hour
- G-force: 2.1
- Trains: Single train with 3 cars. Riders were arranged 2 across in 2 rows with the exception of the first car which had a single row for a total of 10 riders per train.
- Height restriction: 54 in (140 cm) or shorter to ride
- Magic Flyer at RCDB

Magic Flyer formerly Percy's Railway, was a small, oval-circuit steel roller coaster made by Bradley and Kaye that opened in 1971. The coaster was located in the Whistlestop Park area of Six Flags Magic Mountain in Valencia, California. It was an unknown-named coaster at the former Beverly Park prior to operating at Magic Mountain.

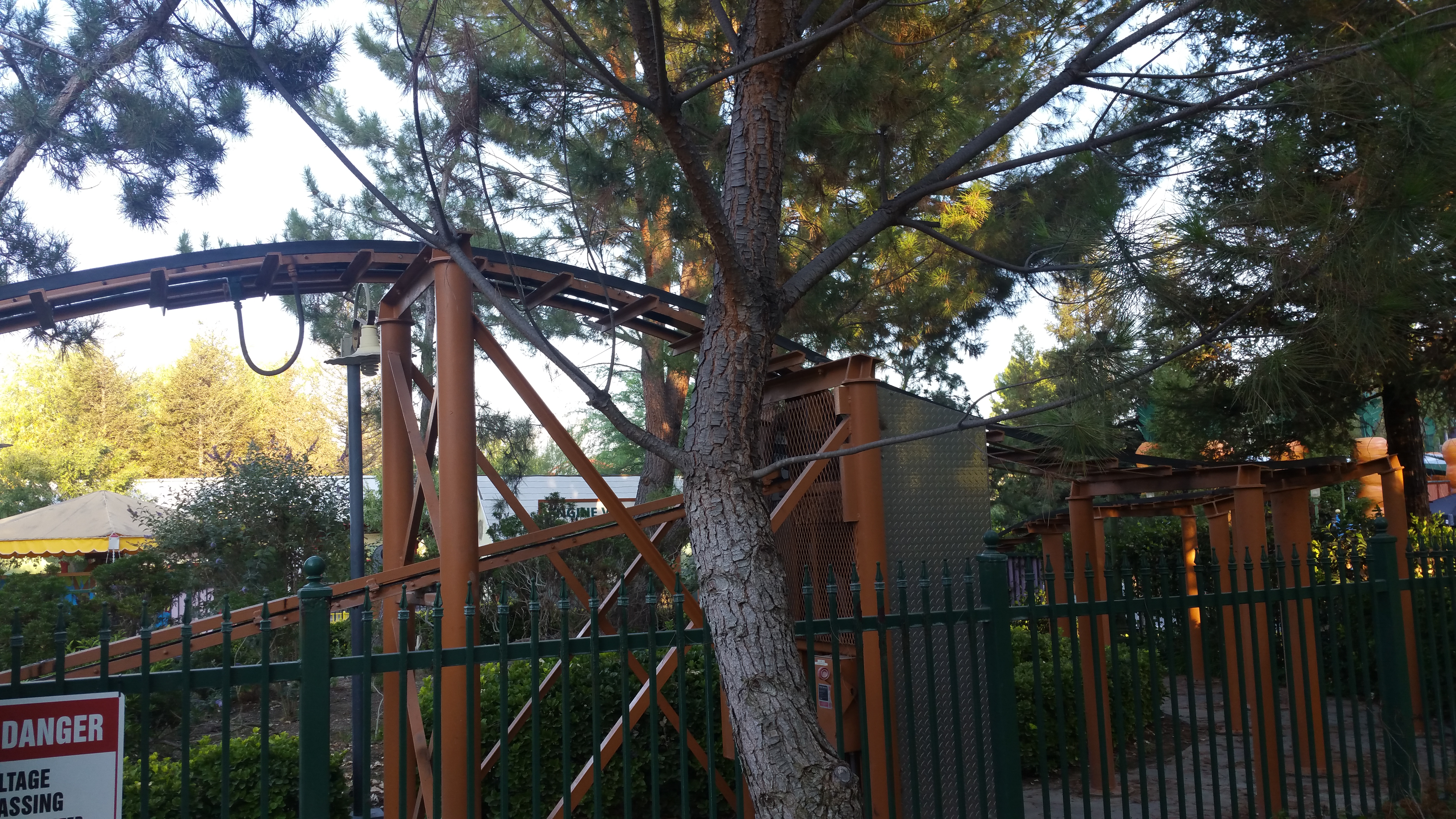
Magic flyer

== History ==
Magic Flyer was originally located at Beverly Park in the 1940s, known as the Little Dipper. It was relocated to Six Flags Magic Mountain in 1971 where it began operation as Clown Coaster. In the 1984-1985 off-season the ride was renamed and rethemed to Wile E. Coyote Coaster to suit the theme of the nearby Bugs Bunny World.

In 1998, the roller coaster closed and was disassembled. In 2000, the coaster was redesigned to look like the larger Goliath roller coaster, located in the same park, and relocated near to it. The old supports were replaced with supports that resembled those found on the Goliath and the trains were rebuilt from the chassis up. It was repainted with Goliath's color scheme and given the name Goliath Jr. (Goliath Junior) to reopen in 2001.

In the 2007-2008 off-season Goliath Jr. was rethemed to Percy's Railway to match Six Flags Magic Mountain's new kids zone, Thomas Town. Similarly to the Goliath Jr. makeover, the cars were rebuilt to resemble Percy the Small Engine (the leading car) and his Troublesome Trucks (the two following cars), all from the television series Thomas & Friends.

In late 2010, Six Flags began the process of removing licensed theming from attractions. They terminated several licenses including that for Thomas the Tank Engine. The Thomas Town at Six Flags Magic Mountain has been renamed and rethemed to Whistlestop Park which reopened on March 19, 2011. Percy's Railway was now again rethemed and renamed to Magic Flyer. The coaster saw very little change aside from Percy's face being removed and the red stripes painted over.

As of December 9, 2025, Six Flags Magic Mountain filed permits to demolish the ride alongside Tweety's Escape due them reaching the end of their service lives. On December 16, 2025, Six Flags officially announced their removals, both being replaced with a new outdoor play area named Taz's Exploration Trail as part of Whistlestop Park's merger with Bugs Bunny World into Looney Tunes Land. The coaster was then reported to have closed in January 2026.

== Ride ==
The train exits out of the station and directly ascends the 10-foot-tall (3.0 m) lift hill. The track then makes a small dip before navigating a 180° turn to the left. A second small dip is followed by another ascent before making a second 180° turn to the left and returning to the station.
