= Six Flags Magic Mountain =

Theme park in Valencia, California

- Previously known as Magic Mountain (1971–1979)
- Logo used since 2025

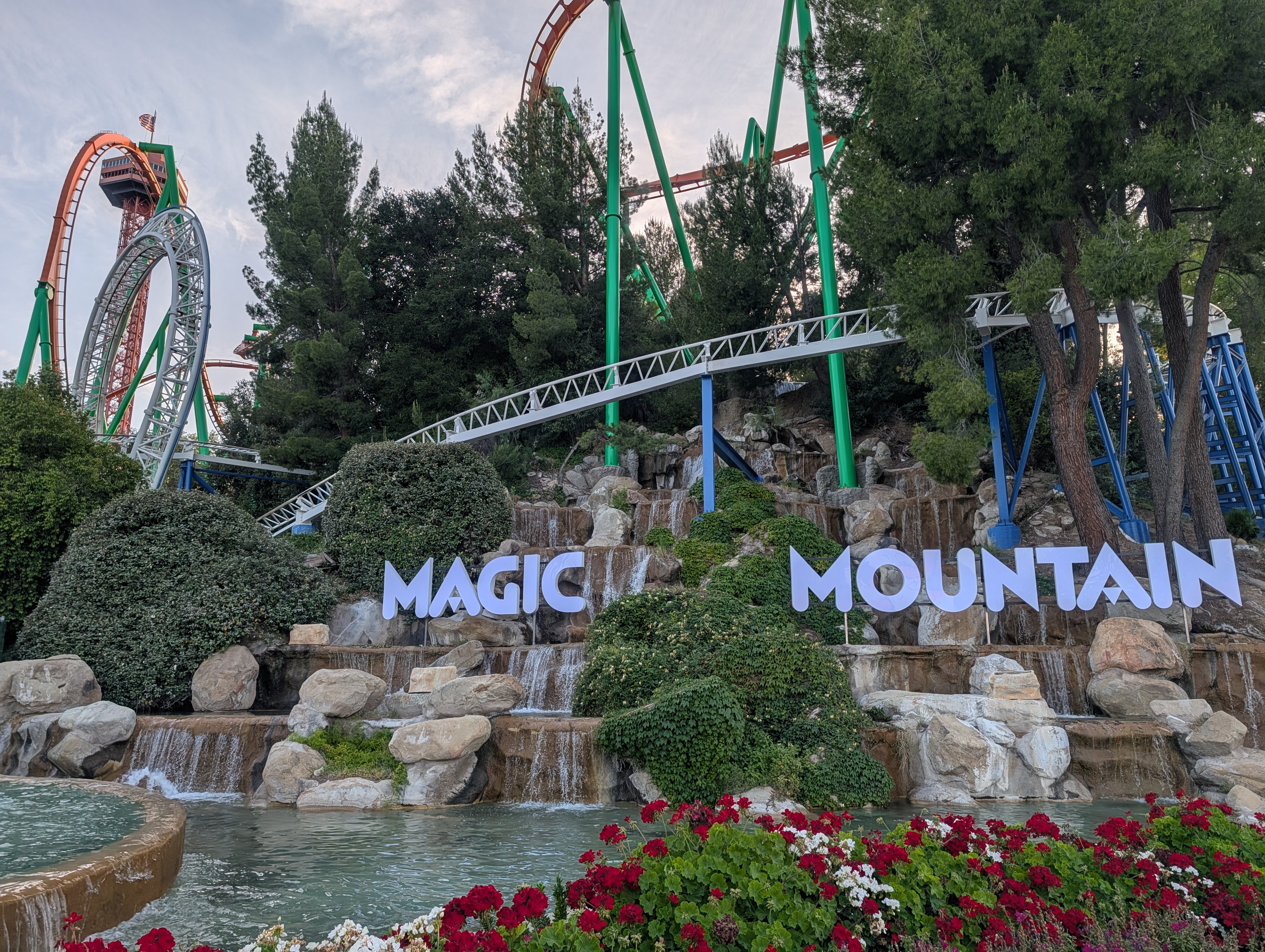
- The entrance plaza and fountain in 2026, with The Great American Revolution and Tatsu in the background.

- Location in Santa Clarita Valley Location in Greater Los Angeles Location in California
- Location: Valencia, California, US
- Coordinates: 34.427°N 118.597°W
- Status: Operating
- Opened: May 29, 1971; 55 years ago
- Owner: Six Flags
- Park president: Brian Oerding
- Slogan: The Thrill Capital of the World
- Operating season: Year round
- Attendance: ▲3.317 million in 2024
- Area: 209 acres (85 ha)

Attractions
- Total: 40
- Roller coasters: 16
- Water rides: 2
- Website: sixflags.com/magicmountain

Six Flags Magic Mountain, formerly known and colloquially referred to as simply Magic Mountain, is a 209-acre (85 ha) amusement park located in unincorporated Los Angeles County, just outside Santa Clarita, California, United States, 35 miles (56 km) northwest of downtown Los Angeles. It opened on May 29, 1971, as a development of the Newhall Land and Farming Company and Sea World Inc. In 1979, Six Flags purchased the park and added "Six Flags" to the park's name.

With 16 operating roller coasters, Six Flags Magic Mountain is tied for third for the most coasters at any park, behind Energylandia in Zator, Poland and a tie between sister parks Cedar Point and Canada's Wonderland and is now, as of September 2026, tied with Six Flags Great America. It became the first amusement park to offer 20 roller coasters with the opening of Wonder Woman: Flight of Courage in 2022. The 2025 removal of Superman: Escape from Krypton would put an end to this record, and it would stop being tied for first place after the closure of Magic Flyer in January 2026. In 2024, the park had an estimated 3.31 million visitors, ranking it 16th in attendance in North America.

== History ==
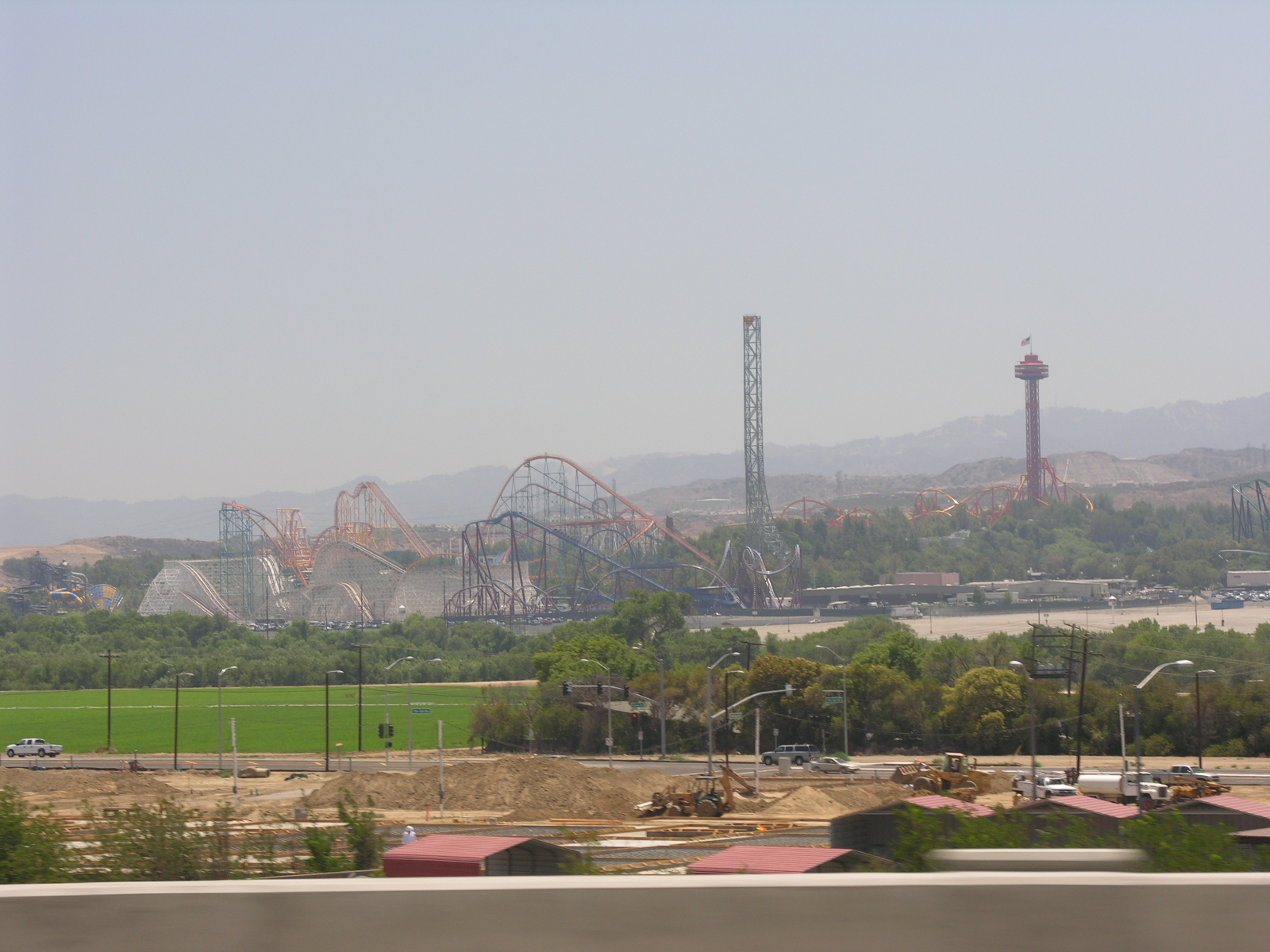
Six Flags Magic Mountain from Interstate 5

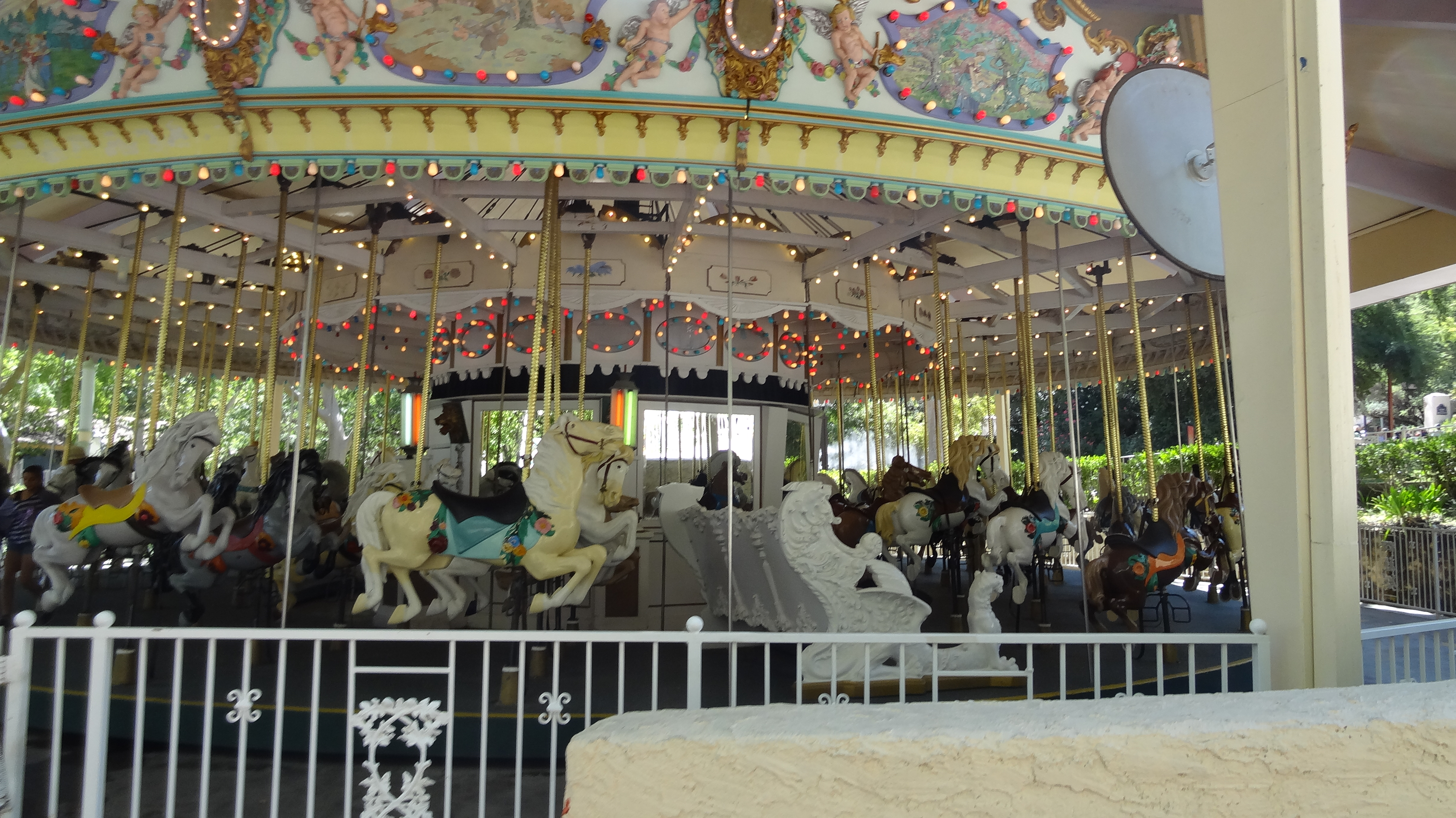
The Grand Carousel is a family friendly ride located in the Six Flags Plaza area.

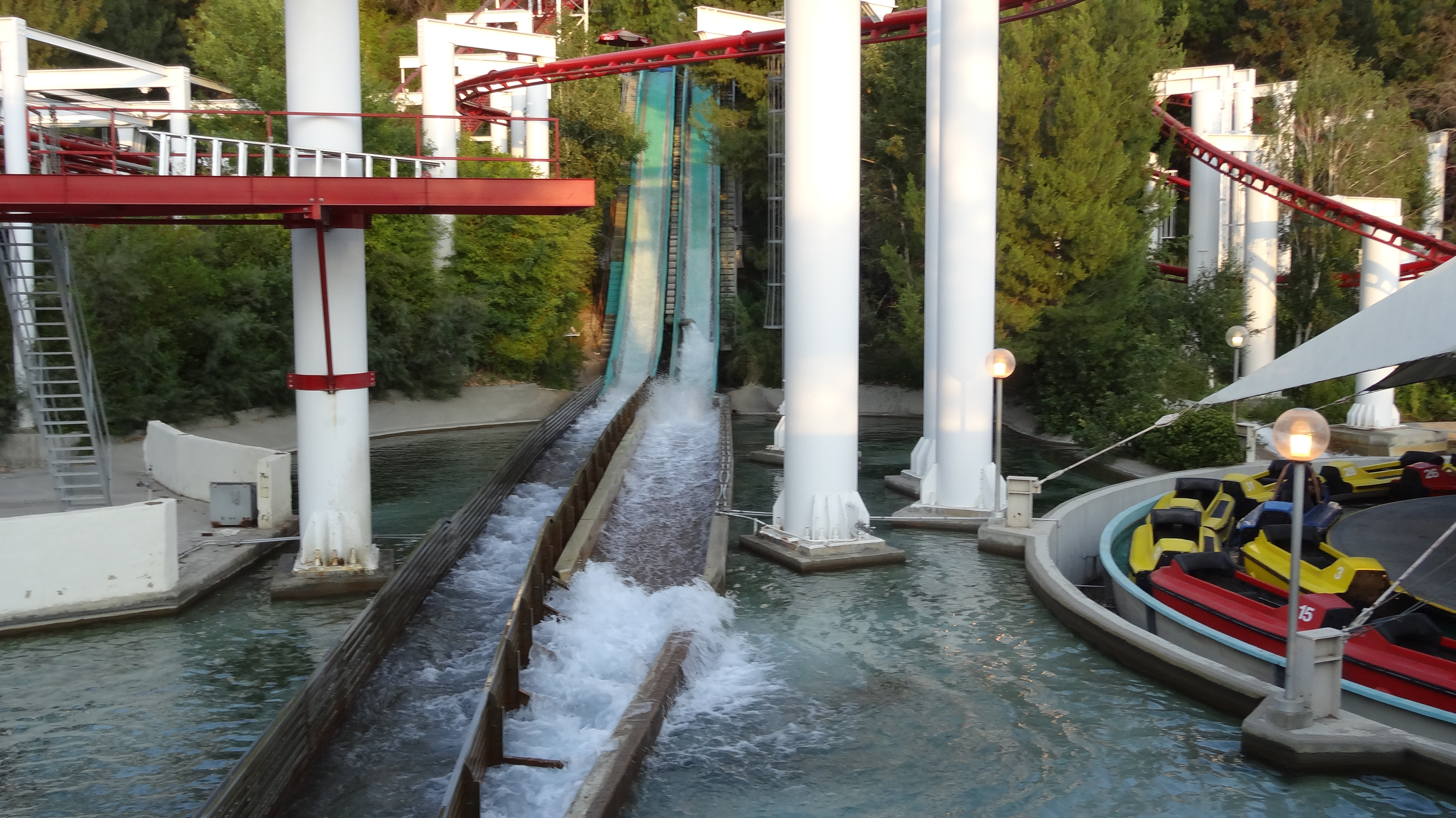
Jet Stream is a family friendly flume ride located near the entrance to Gold Rusher. The ride opened in 1972.

In 1968, Sea World Inc. founder George Millay and his executives began looking for a place in Los Angeles county to build a theme park. Knowing that Newhall Land and Farming Company had enough undeveloped land in the new town of Valencia, he asked CEO John F. Dickason if they could build on his land. They eventually formed a partnership to build a 200-acre theme park (81 ha). Construction began in November 1969 and continued until May 1971. The park was named after the nearby Magic Mountain, a peak located to the east of the Santa Clarita Valley.

When the park opened, there were 500 employees and 33 attractions, many of which were designed and built by Arrow Development, which had previously worked on attractions at Disneyland. The admission price in 1971 was $5 for adults, and $3.50 for children between the ages of 3 and 12. Because the park was in a relatively remote part of Los Angeles County at the time, the Greyhound bus line provided bus service to and from the park and Los Angeles, and from Northern California, and optionally allowed purchase of park admission at the time the bus ticket was purchased.

At its 1971 opening, the rides and attractions included Gold Rusher, a steel coaster; the Log Jammer, a log flume; the Sky Tower, an observation tower; Grand Prix, similar to Disneyland's Autopia ride; El Bumpo, bumper boats; a carousel; and other smaller rides. There were four transportation rides to the peak: Funicular, a cable railway or funicular, which was renamed Orient Express, then Helpful Honda Express, and is currently named Magic Mover.

Attractions included The Metro, which was three monorail stations around the park, including the Whitewater Lake, Country Fair, and Mountain stations; and "Eagles Flight", a gondola lift ride that had two stations at the peak, the long one north to Galaxy Station and the short one west to El Dorado Station. The Showcase Theater (later renamed the Golden Bear Theater) was part of the original park and featured Barbra Streisand as the first of many headline performers who would appear at Magic Mountain over the years.

In the 1971 season, Magic Mountain obtained permission from Warner Bros. to use Looney Tunes/Merrie Melodies characters. Six Flags Great America, has continuously used such characters since its opening in 1976, eight years before Marriott Corporation sold the park to Six Flags.

In 1972, Magic Mountain began using trolls as the park mascots. The trolls King Blop, also known as King Troll, Bleep, Bloop, and the Wizard became recognizable symbols of Magic Mountain. All King Productions, a contractor, provided the entertainers wearing the costumes until December 31, 1972, when Magic Mountain took on that role. The characters were used until 1985. Also in 1972, a second flume ride named Jet Stream was added.

In 1973, the park added its second roller coaster, the Mountain Express, a compact Schwarzkopf Wildcat model steel coaster. In 1974, the park also installed a new complex of spinning rides in what would later be known as Back Street. The new additions consisted of the Himalaya, Electric Rainbow, and Tumble Drum.

In 1975, the Grand Centennial Railway opened in the Back Street. It took riders on a train journey to Spillikin Corners and back. "...the Grand Centennial Excursion used a narrow gauge (3-ft.) steam locomotive and employed "train conductors," decked out in old-fashioned three-piece black Western suits and bow ties, to take passengers on a trip through time (and through the bison corral), with stops at Spillikin Corners and at the northwestern tip of the park where Six Flags would later build "Batman: The Ride."... " Local television advertisements at the time described this new attraction as, "The other side of the Mountain".

=== The Coaster Revolution ===
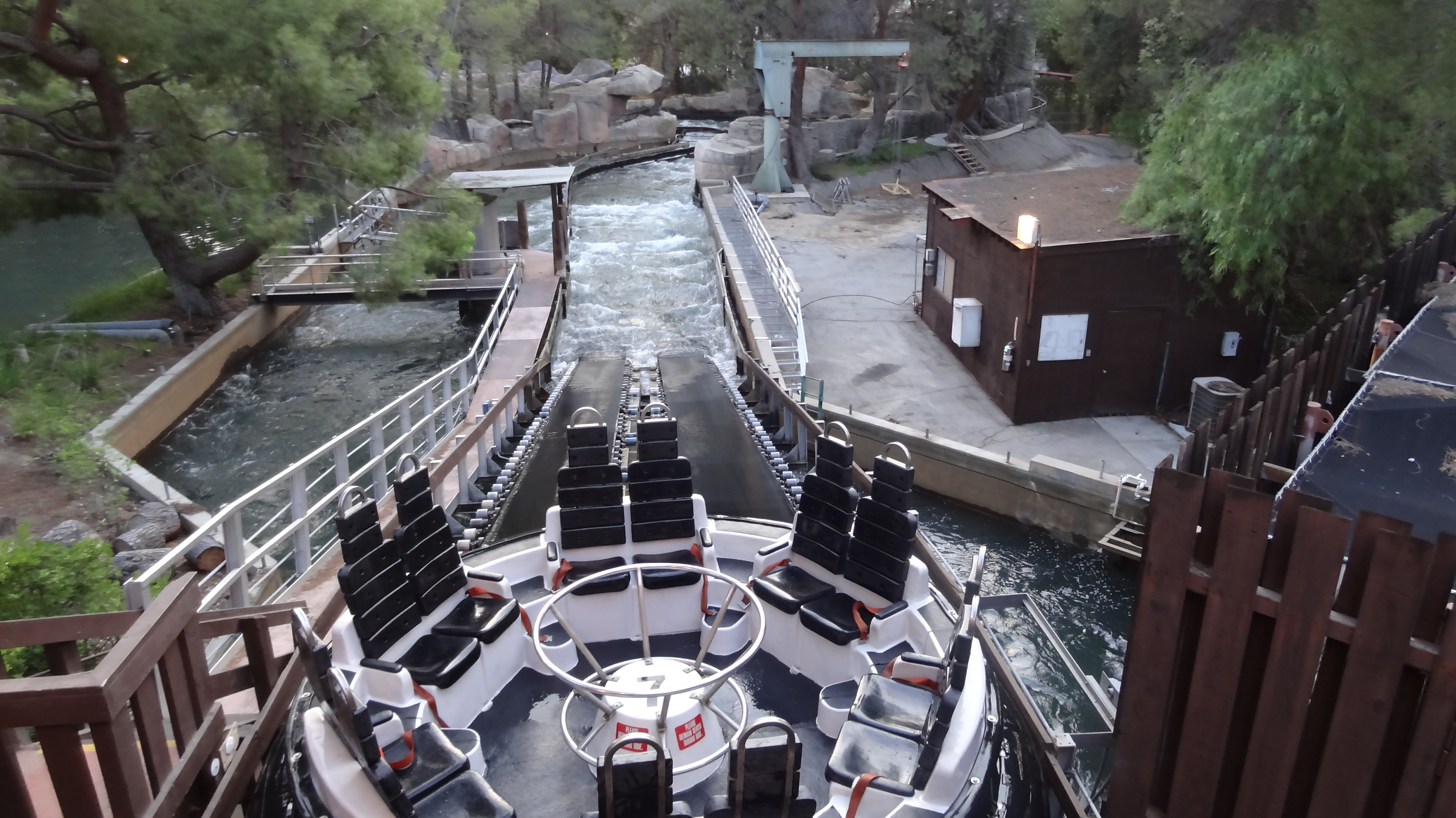
Roaring Rapids is a river rafting water ride at Six Flags Magic Mountain.

With the opening of Great American Revolution in 1976, Magic Mountain became the first park in the world to have a modern, 360-degree looping steel coaster. Previous roller coasters with loops had been built and dismantled elsewhere due to safety issues. When it was built, there was very little in the way of surrounding vegetation. In the time since, the tracks have been surrounded by trees and bushes, which prevents the riders from knowing the track layout beforehand. Universal filmed part of the suspense film Rollercoaster at Magic Mountain in late 1976, which featured the Revolution as its centerpiece during the film's climax.

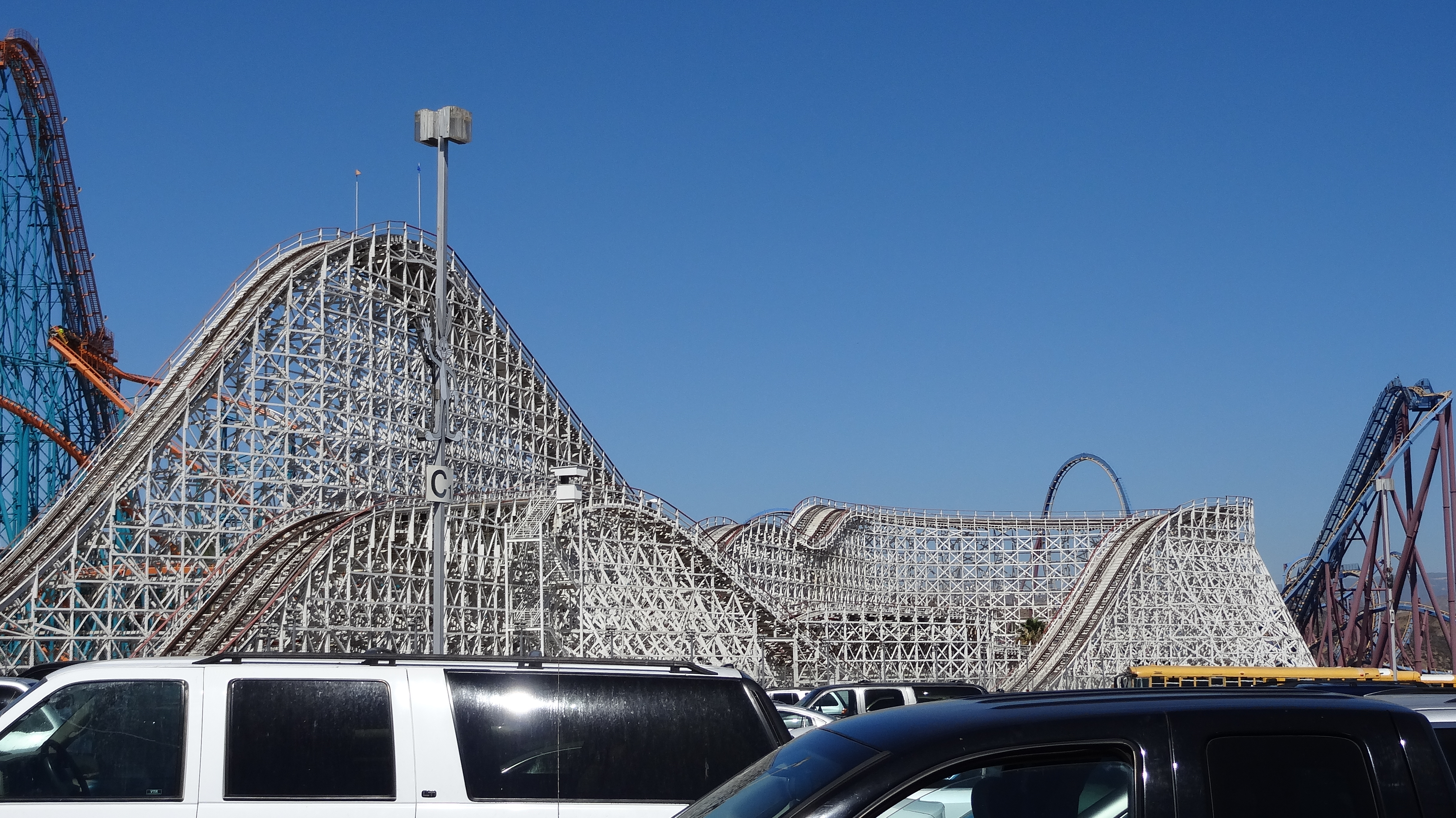
Colossus was a wooden roller coaster which opened in 1978.

In 1978, Colossus opened, and at the time was the fastest and largest dual-tracked wooden coaster in the world. Following its first season, it was closed and extensively redone. When it reopened, it was a much smoother ride.

In 1991, the camel hump before the last, or third, turn was replaced by a block brake. Though it decreased the speed of the ride after this particular brake, it allowed three trains to run per side at a time, greatly increasing capacity. One of the trains sometimes ran backwards for a few years in the mid-1980s. In the late 1990s this kind of ride was no longer possible due to the newer ride system in place, as well as different trains. During Fright Fest, the park runs one side backwards using a set of trains acquired from the now-demolished Psyclone, which was located on the other side of the park.

In 2015, the coaster was re-tracked with steel tracking and several inversions were added. It was rebranded "Twisted Colossus". This renovation was completed by Rocky Mountain Construction.

=== Six Flags era ===
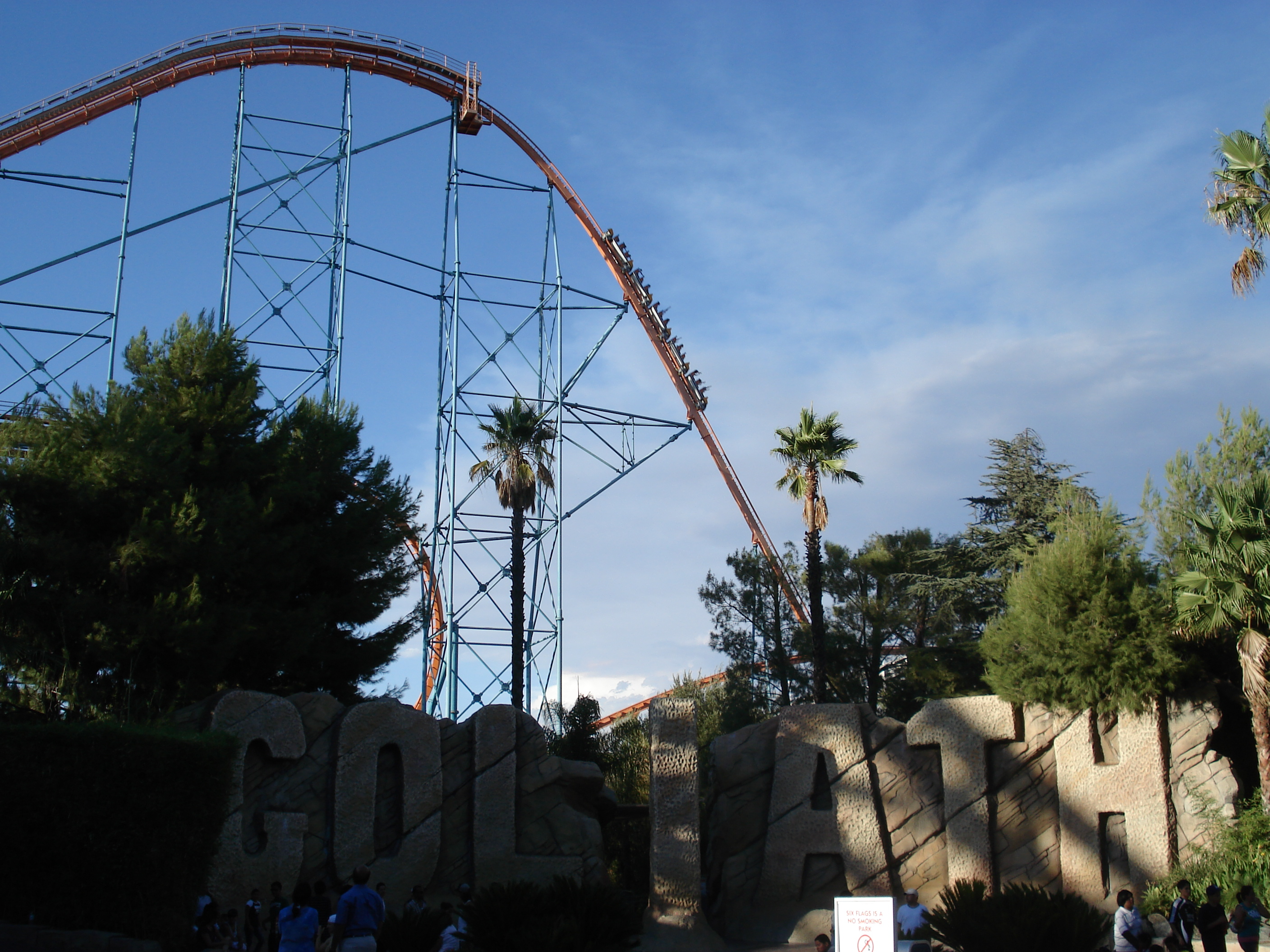
The opening drop on Goliath. Goliath featured the longest drop on a closed circuit roller coaster when it opened in February 2000.

In 1979, the park was sold to Six Flags and became known as Six Flags Magic Mountain. In 1981, Six Flags Magic Mountain introduced Roaring Rapids, a river rapids ride that was on the West Coast for the first time. It was developed by Intamin in conjunction with the now-defunct Six Flags Astroworld, which had opened a similar ride in 1979. Along with Rapids came the completion of the midway near Spillikin Corners to link with Revolution's area. A complete circuit could be made around the park.

It was originally designed as a dual-sided station, but only one was fully developed, and all that exists of the possible second side is a few supports. It uses large pumps to circulate water, and each of the two pumps can circulate 88,500 U.S. gallons per minute (5.58 m^{3}/s). The reservoir can hold 1.5 million U.S. gallons (5.7 Ml) of water, and one of the innovations used on it was the introduction of guide boards to help eliminate jam ups.

In 1982, the attraction Freefall was added. Also built by Intamin, it was considered a cutting-edge drop tower ride if not strictly a "roller coaster." It simply ascends the tower and then drops down, with the track curving horizontally, leaving riders on their backs. Others were built for other parks (some of which are Six Flags). Today, most of these rides are obsolete and have been removed. Some flat rides were added, and others were removed the following year.

In 1984, Sarajevo Bobsleds was erected. Yet another ride built by Intamin, the coaster was basically a bobsled without ice and snow. The coaster was built in honor of the 1984 Winter Olympics, for which Sarajevo was the host city. Six Flags Great Adventure added a similar ride that same year. In 1986, Sarajevo Bobsleds was moved to Six Flags Over Texas, where it operated as La Vibora until permanently closing in late 2024. The other bobsled was moved to Six Flags Great America and later to The Great Escape in Queensbury, New York, where it operated as Alpine Bobsled.

In 1985, Children's World was rethemed as Bugs Bunny World, as Magic Mountain had abandoned the Trolls in favor of Looney Tunes/Merrie Melodies characters, licensed by Warner Bros. That year, Michael Jackson visited the park, riding rides such as Colossus, Revolution, and Roaring Rapids. In 1986, the park added a steel stand-up looping roller coaster called Shockwave, also designed by Intamin. This coaster was located in the back of the park, replacing Sarajevo Bobsleds.

At the end of 1988, the coaster was removed as part of a ride rotation program and went to Six Flags Great Adventure in 1990. It was removed from there in 1992 and was repainted white and rethemed upon its removal to Six Flags Astroworld. There, it was known as Batman The Escape. When Astroworld closed in 2005, the ride was put in storage at Six Flags Darien Lake, where it remained until 2018, when it was finally sold for scrap.

In 1987, the park rethemed the Back Street. Spinning flat rides were renamed Turbo (Electric Rainbow), Subway (Himalaya), and Reactor (Enterprise). The dance club was rethemed as well and located near Reactor. After Hours, as it was now called (formerly Decibels), stayed open for one summer later than the rest of the park. It, along with Back Street, would remain open an additional two hours as a place for locals to hang out. This format lasted one season.

In 1988, Ninja, "The Black Belt of Roller Coasters," opened. Built by Arrow Dynamics, it was the first suspended swing roller coaster on the west coast. Ninja has gone through very few changes since it was opened in 1988; evidently, only the wheels and paint have been changed.

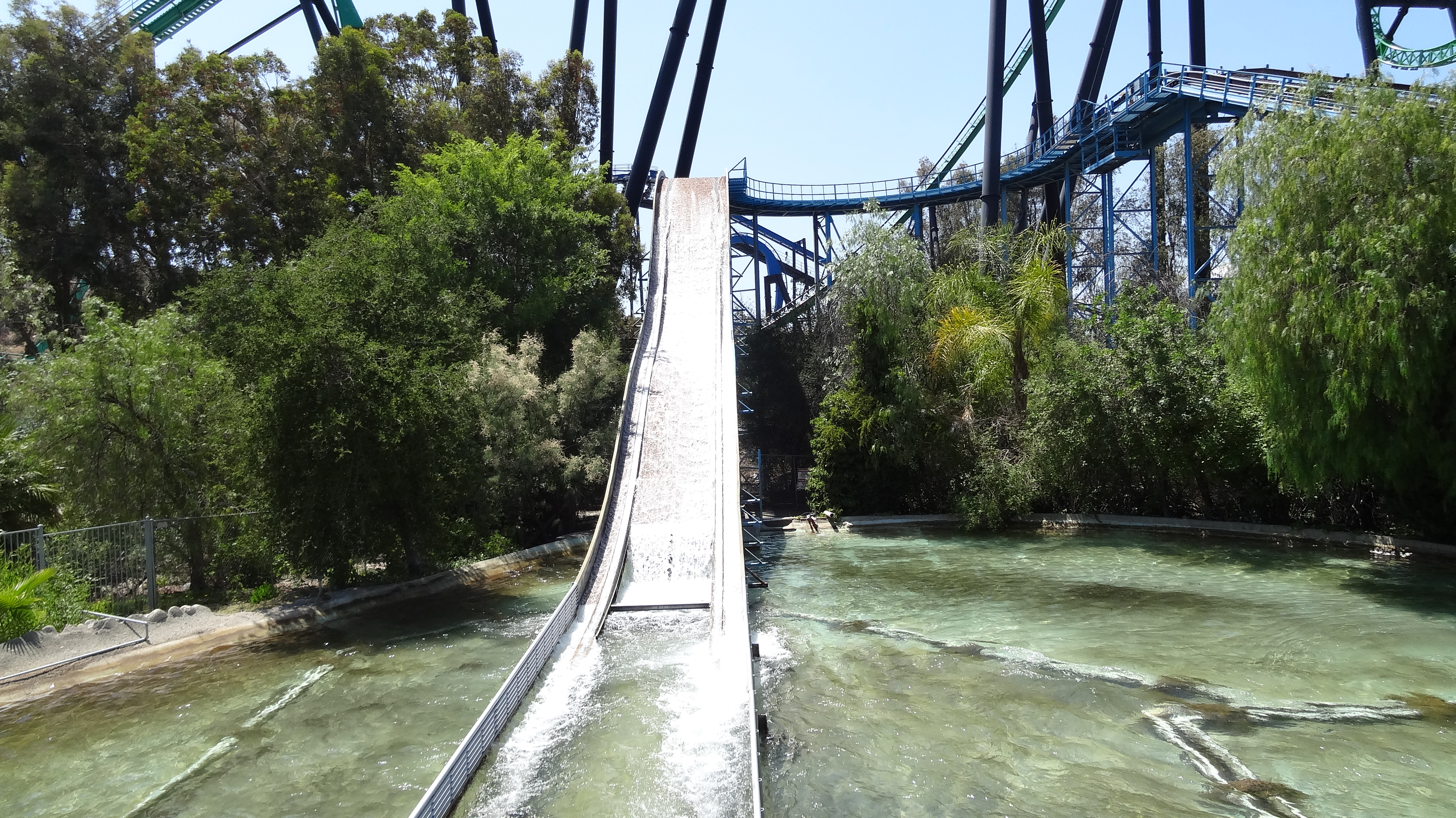
Tidal Wave was a Shoot the Chute water ride, featuring a 50-foot (15 m) splashdown into a large body of water.

Tidal Wave opened in 1989. It is a short, wet ride featuring a large boat that travels up a low-angled incline to a level water trough. The trough, in the shape of a semicircle, ends in a steep drop into a large splashpool. The impact displaces large amounts of water on its riders. The ride's exit ramp crosses over the splash pool, allowing willing patrons leaving the ride to get soaked from the splash. The attraction was closed to make room for Wonder Woman: Flight of Courage in 2020.

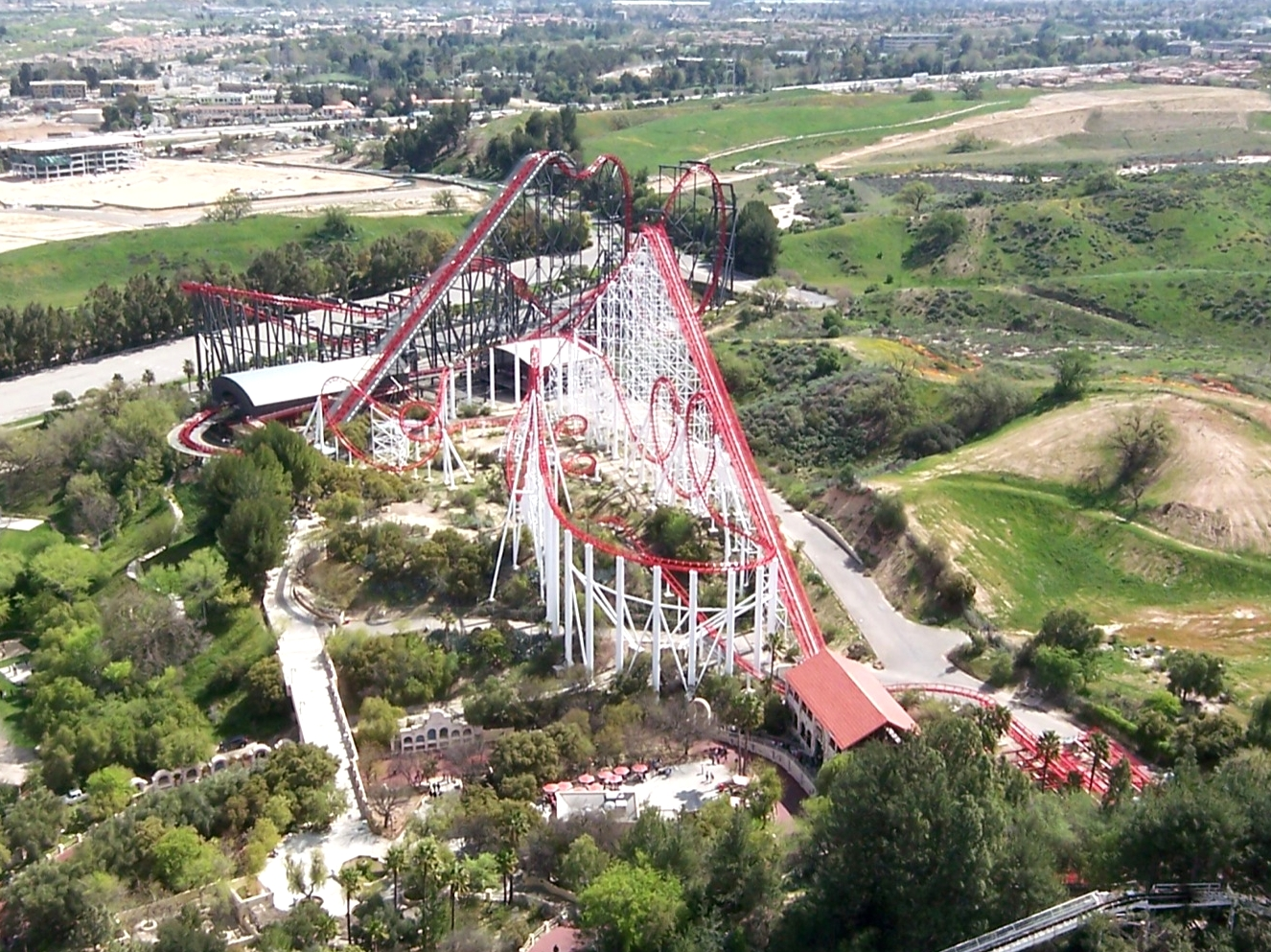
Viper, seen in the foreground, was built in 1990.

In 1990, Viper, a multiple-looping coaster designed by Arrow Dynamics, opened. It features a 188-foot (57 m) drop, speeds up to 70 mph (110 km/h), three vertical loops, a batwing turn that inverts riders twice, and a double corkscrew.

In 1991, Magic Mountain added Psyclone, a wooden coaster modeled after the Coney Island Cyclone. The Spillikin Corners area of the park was rethemed as Cyclone Bay to suit the new coaster, drawing guests into this area. The change was largely cosmetic, as the earlier theme relied on retail establishments that had been removed previously. The Shooting Gallery had replaced the Glass Blower, and the Candy Kitchen viewing area was redesigned. With Psyclone, the crowds returned. Psyclone's structure was damaged in the 1994 Northridge earthquake, and the ride was eventually removed in 2007. After adding Ninja, Viper, and Psyclone within four years, the park was building a large repertoire of big roller coasters.

A new coaster from Intamin called Flashback was added to the park the following year in 1992. The prototype Space Diver model was a first of its kind that had already operated at Six Flags Great America and Six Flags Over Georgia prior to its arrival. Due to the excessive noise it generated near Hurricane Harbor, Flashback was closed in 2003 and eventually removed in 2007.

=== Time Warner era ===
In 1993, Six Flags Magic Mountain entered the Time Warner era. The new ride for the year was Yosemite Sam Sierra Falls, a water ride with two twisting tubes that riders could slide down using a raft. Also that year, there was retheming and the High Sierra Territory was opened. The Showcase Theatre became the Golden Bear Theater, the Animal Star Theatre was created in Bugs Bunny World, and a large, fake wooden tree was built.

In 1993, live concerts ended in the park due to a riot that broke out as a result of a TLC concert that was oversold. Magic Mountain was quickly overwhelmed by large crowds that vandalized and destroyed property. Park shops had their windows broken and looting quickly followed. Police were called to the scene in full riot gear. The park was evacuated and closed down for the night.

In 1994, Magic Mountain added what two other Six Flags parks already had, a Bolliger & Mabillard inverted looping roller coaster called Batman: The Ride. More Six Flags parks added the ride in the coming years. Batman: The Ride is an inverted coaster, meaning the usual coaster protocol is reversed: the track is overhead and the cars are below it. The trains travel on the outside of the loops, and rider's legs hang freely, as on a ski lift.

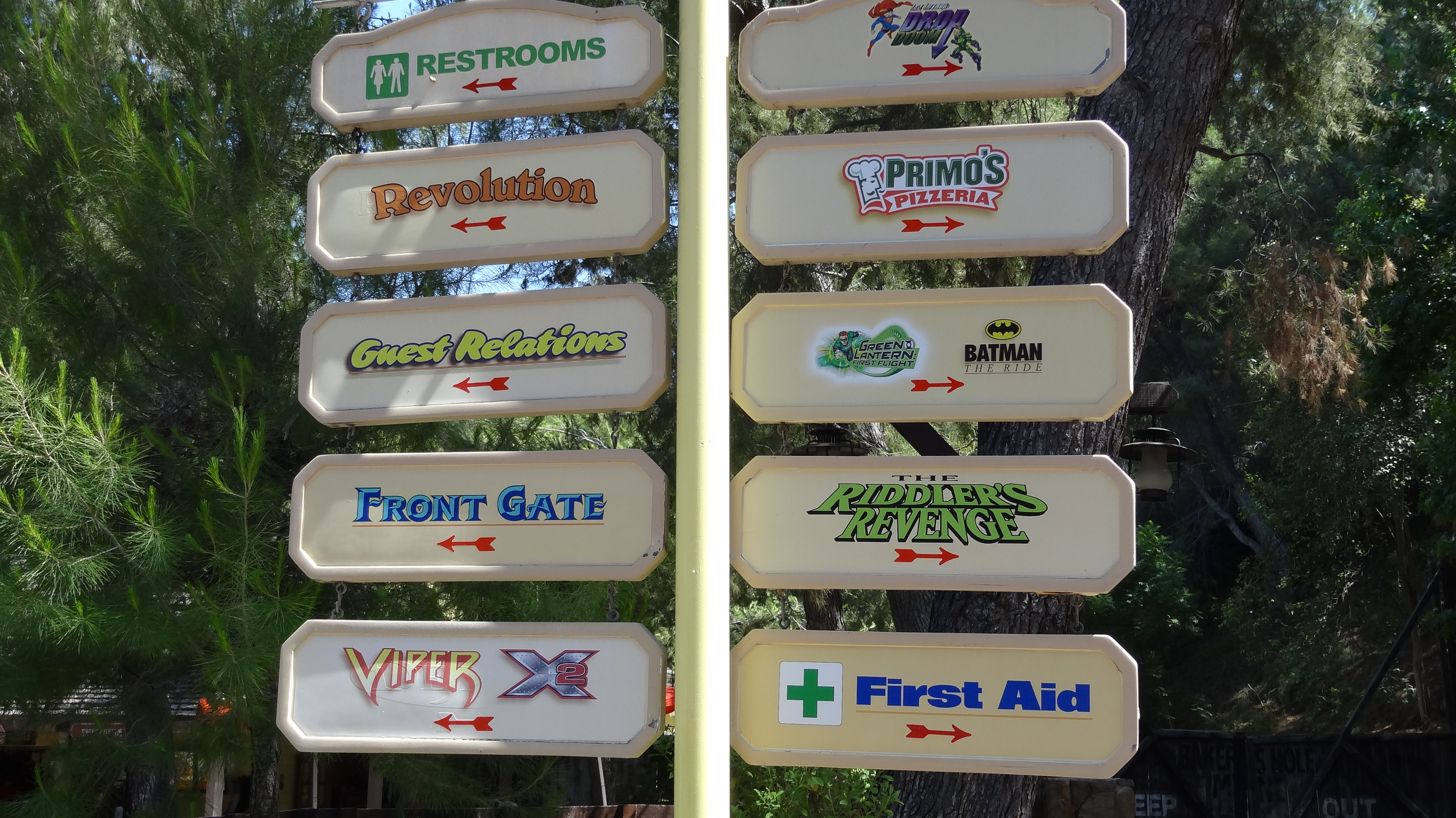
Signs to nearby rides and other attractions

A separately gated waterpark called Six Flags Hurricane Harbor opened on June 16, 1995. The 22-acre (8.9 ha) park included body slides, tube slides, a kiddie water play area, a lazy river, and a wave pool. The following year, a SkyCoaster called Dive Devil opened at Magic Mountain.

A dual launch coaster called Superman: The Escape debuted at the park on March 15, 1997. Designed by Intamin, the 30-second ride launches riders from 0 to 100 mph (160 km/h) in seven seconds on a track that scales up a 41-story tower. It was the first roller coaster in the world to reach speeds of 100 miles per hour (160 km/h). Originally slated to open in June 1996, the ride's opening was delayed and pushed back to 1997 as problems with the LSM launch motors were found. The tower structure was painted a grayish white when the ride first opened and lasted until 2011.

=== Premier Parks era ===
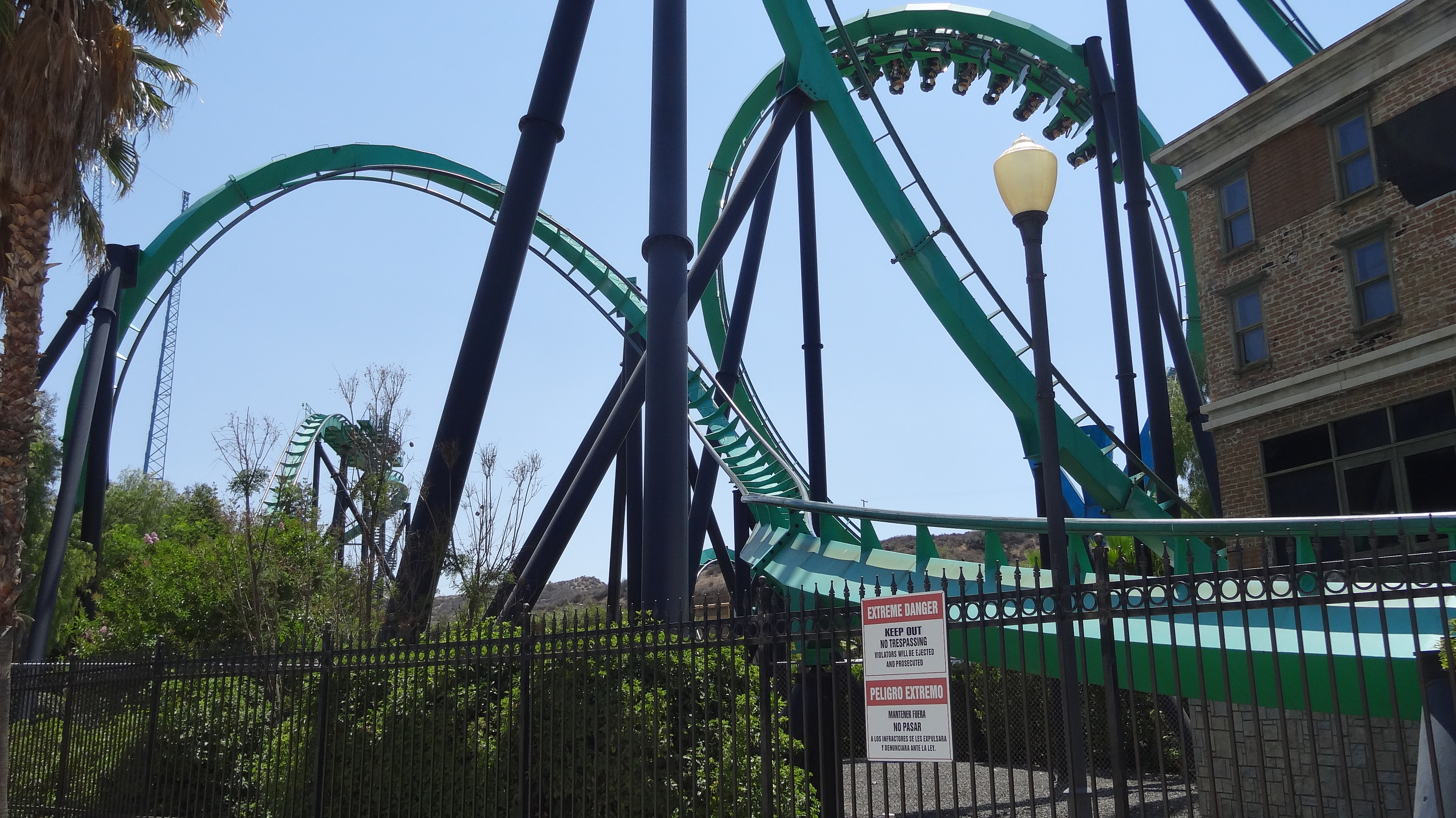
The Riddler's Revenge is a stand-up roller coaster which features six inversions.

In 1998, a new Bolliger & Mabillard stand-up roller coaster called Riddler's Revenge opened as the tallest and fastest stand-up roller coaster in the world. Later that year, Six Flags was acquired by Premier Parks. In 2000, a steel hypercoaster called Goliath, which was manufactured by Giovanola, opened at the park.

Three new roller coasters opened in 2001, although only one opened on schedule – a kiddie steel coaster called Goliath Jr. The other two, Déjà Vu and X (now X²), suffered early mechanical issues. Déjà Vu opened late in 2001 and X opened early in 2002. Déjà Vu was designed by Vekoma and is a Giant Inverted Boomerang coaster (GIB), a variant of their popular Boomerang design. It is an inverted coaster with coaches suspended beneath an overhead track that traverses an open-circuit track forward and in reverse and features two completely vertical drops and three inversions.

After its late opening, the ride still suffered a lot of downtime. X was designed by Arrow Dynamics as the world's first "fourth-dimensional" roller coaster. It was the only one in North America where riders experience going 360 degrees in their seats. Each seat lies on a separate axis from the track. This coaster managed to open briefly on January 12, 2002, only to close due to more technical problems. It reopened late in August of that year. The ride closed for a major refurbishment and retheme in 2008 where X transformed into X².

In 2003, Scream, designed by Bolliger & Mabillard, was added. At this point, Six Flags Magic Mountain tied with Cedar Point for the park with the most roller coasters in the United States. Scream is similar in concept to Medusa at Six Flags Discovery Kingdom and is a mirror image of Medusa at Six Flags Great Adventure. It is a floorless roller coaster with trains riding above the rails traversing seven inversions on 3,985 feet (1,215 m) of track on floorless trains. In 2006, Tatsu, a Bolliger & Mabillard flying roller coaster, was added, causing a temporary closure of Revolution and Roaring Rapids to allow construction to take place. It was much larger than the other three Bolliger & Mabillard Flying Coasters at other Six Flags parks, all named Superman: Ultimate Flight. Tatsu has a suspended-track orientation featuring vehicles that recline passengers with their backs against the track and facing the ground.

=== 2006 attempted sale ===
On June 22, 2006, Six Flags, Inc. announced that it was exploring options for six of its parks, including Magic Mountain and its neighboring water park, Hurricane Harbor. Though management said closing the park was unlikely, rumors still began that the park could be sold to real estate developers, with an intent to close the park and build housing developments in the area. Park officials cited dwindling attendance due to rowdy behavior among some of the park-goers as reasons for wanting to sell the park while management was wanting to move Six Flags into more of a family park direction. Throughout the Six Flags chain, attendance in the second quarter of 2006 was 14 percent lower than it was in the second quarter of 2005.

By the fall of 2006, Six Flags confirmed that Magic Mountain had remained for sale. They also stated, however, that it would be sold to a company that would continue to operate it as a park, and that closing Magic Mountain was not a possibility. Cedar Fair, Anheuser-Busch, and several others considered buying the park but none of the offers came close to the asking price.

By the time Six Flags announced which parks it was selling in January 2007, Magic Mountain was no longer one of them. The company decided not to sell Magic Mountain and its adjacent water park. Spokeswoman Wendy Goldberg said that upon further evaluation, the company decided that the Los Angeles parks remained too valuable to relinquish, as sales were increasing, and that the park would not be sold. Other parks were sold as a package and remained open.

=== Since 2007 ===
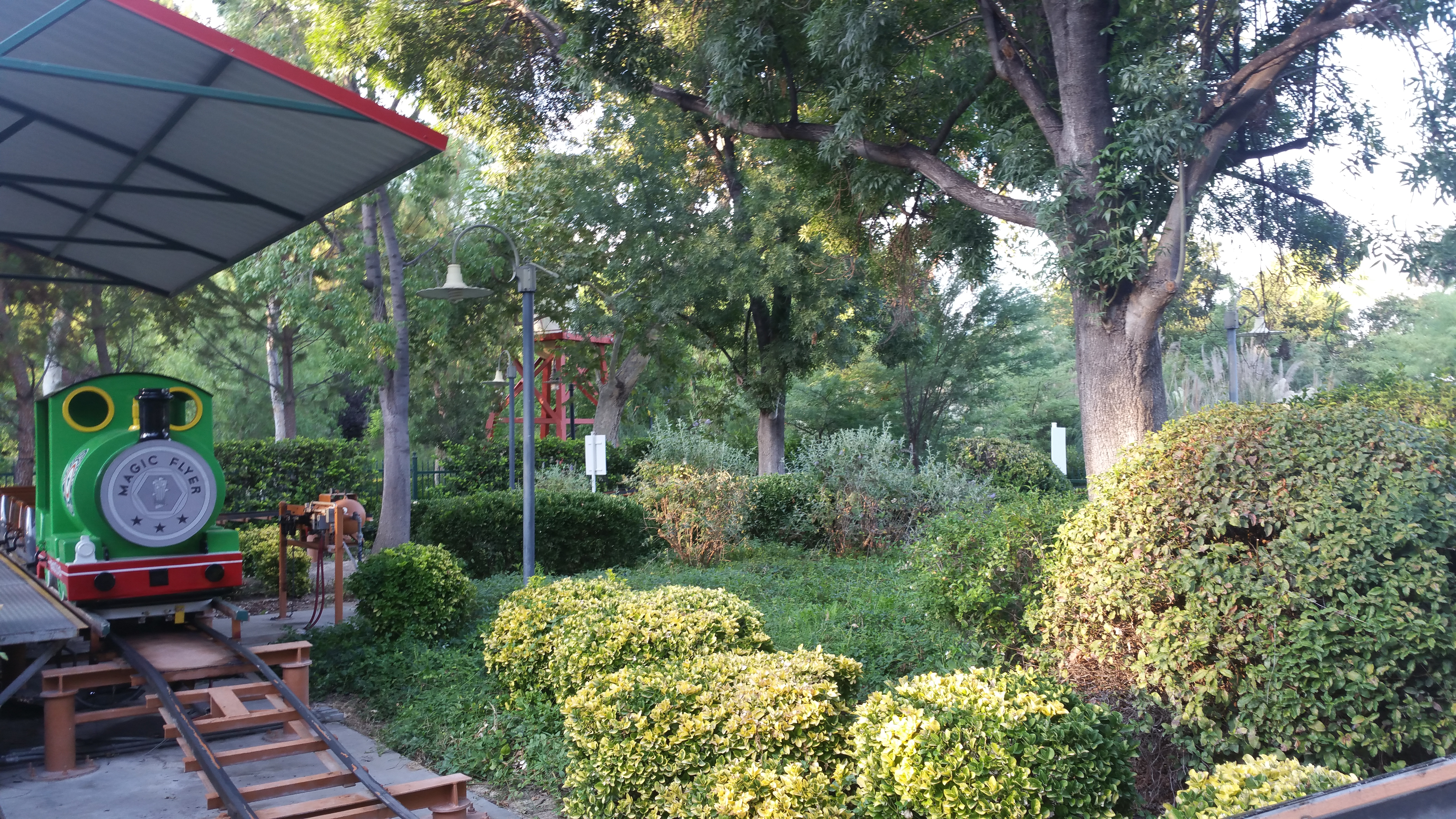
Magic flyer roller coaster

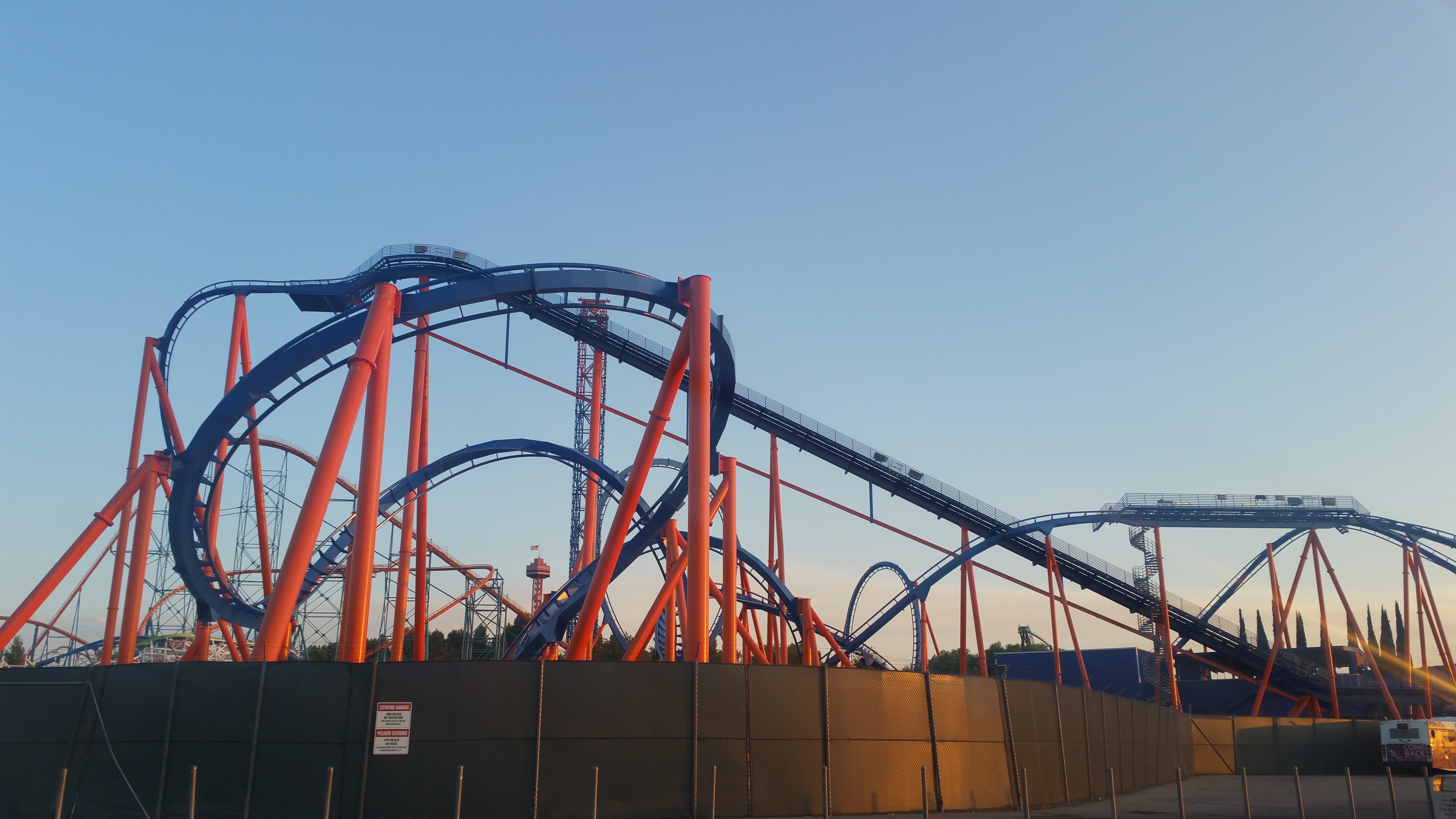
Scream roller coaster

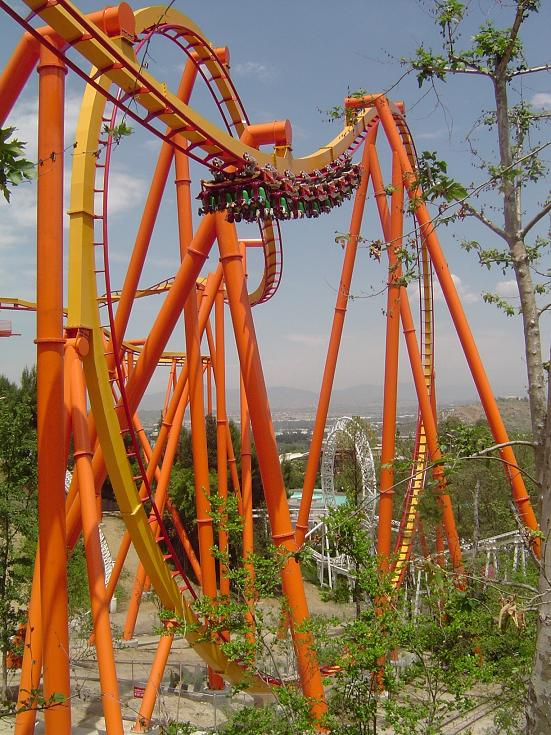
Tatsu, one of the roller coasters at Six Flags Magic Mountain

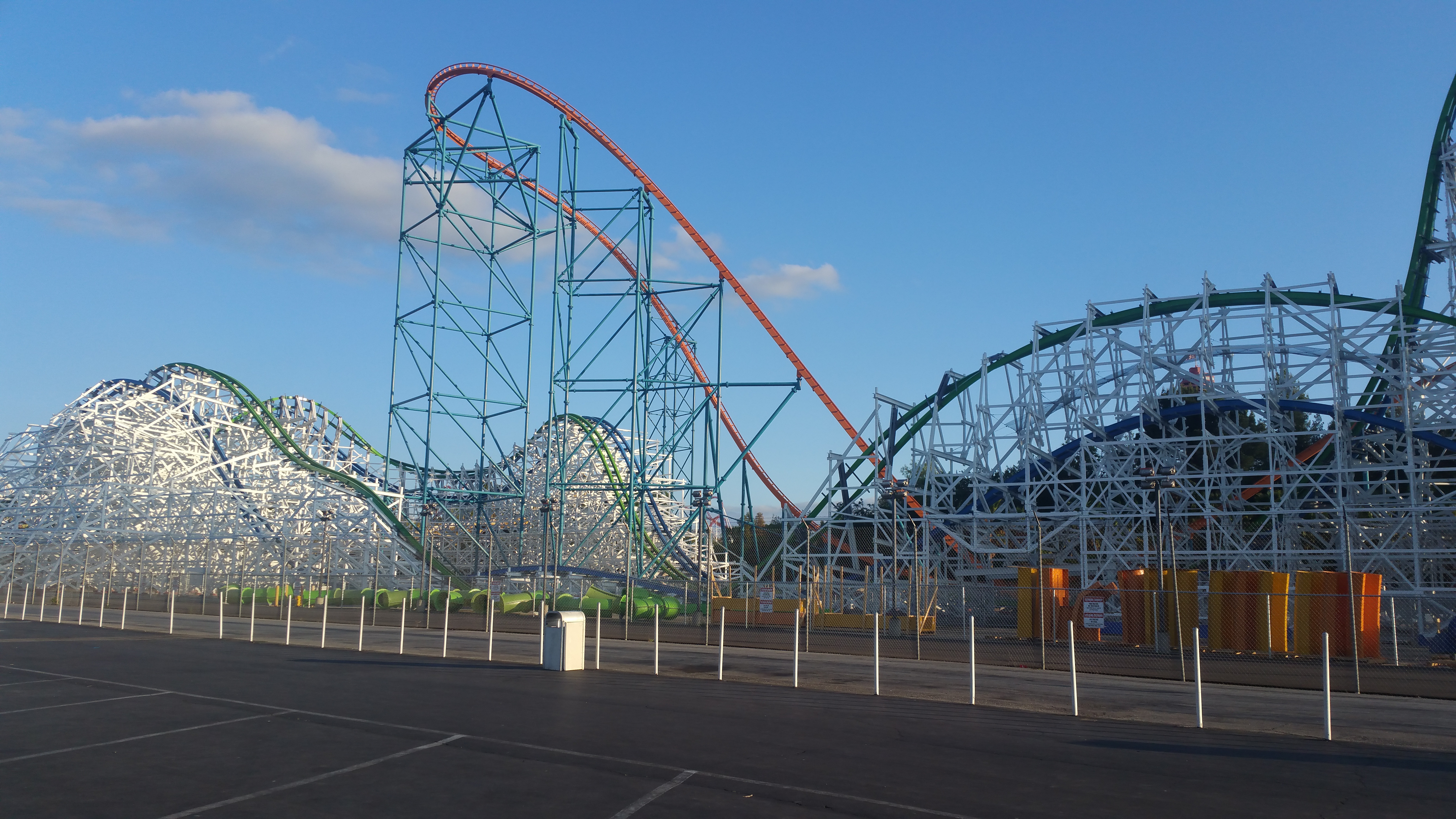
Twisted Colossus, one of Magic Mountain's most signature and iconic roller coasters. Colossus was shut down in 2014 to become reborn as Twisted Colossus.

With the removal of Flashback and Psyclone in 2007, Six Flags Magic Mountain was no longer tied for the record of having the most roller coasters in a single park, relinquishing the record back to Cedar Point. The park instead turned its focus to family-oriented improvements, including a new children's themed area called Thomas Town, which was added in 2008.

One of its premier thrill rides received a makeover. X was closed on in late 2007 for its transformation into X^{2}, adding new fourth-generation trains and special effects and being repainted. It reopened on May 24, 2008. Later in 2008, the park renovated the "Magic of the Mountain" museum at the top of its Sky Tower attraction, which houses memorabilia from the park's history including old television commercials, park maps, models, and equipment salvaged from defunct rides.

Terminator Salvation: The Ride, a wooden roller coaster, opened on May 23, 2009. It was built in the former location of Psyclone and featured tunnels, spraying mist, and special effects. On January 9, 2011, the ride was renamed Apocalypse and given an appropriate theme that reflects an "end of the world" scenario. Later that year, Six Flags President and CEO Mark Shapiro said in a Los Angeles Times published interview that Magic Mountain had plans to install a new roller coaster for its 2010 season, and would add a new themed area for children in 2011 called Wiggles World. Shapiro also stated that the adjacent Hurricane Harbor would receive an expansion.

On May 29, 2010, Mr. Six's Dance Coaster was scheduled to open but was delayed until 2011 when it would open under a new theme. On the same day, Mr. Six's Splash Island opened at the adjacent Hurricane Harbor water park.

In August 2010, it was announced that Superman: The Escape would undergo a major redevelopment before the 2011 season. On October 20, 2010, Six Flags Magic Mountain officially announced their full plans for 2011 after a video was leaked six days earlier. In addition to opening Mr. Six's Dance Coaster under a new name and theme, Six Flags announced two other attractions. In time for the 2011 season, Superman: The Escape was refurbished to Superman: Escape from Krypton and opened on March 19, 2011. The coaster featured new backwards launching cars and a new color scheme.

The third and final announcement regards an entirely new thrill roller coaster. Green Lantern: First Flight opened on July 1, 2011, as Magic Mountain's eighteenth roller coaster, which was an Intamin ZacSpin. With this roller coaster, Magic Mountain reclaimed for the park the world record for the highest number of roller coasters at a single theme park. It was later announced, on November 4, 2010, that the children's roller coaster would be called Road Runner Express and located in Bugs Bunny World.

In late 2010, Six Flags began the process of removing non-Warner Bros. licensed theming from attractions. They terminated several licenses including Terminator and Thomas the Tank Engine. Terminator Salvation: The Ride was renamed and rethemed into Apocalypse, which re-opened on January 8, 2011. Thomas Town was renamed and rethemed to Whistlestop Park in time for the 2011 season.

On January 18, 2011, the Los Angeles Times reported after considering a new theme based on DC Comics superhero sidekicks, the park opted for simplicity and renamed the Little Flash coaster to Road Runner Express. Due to Green Lantern being placed in Gotham City Backlot, the area was re-themed into DC Universe. In addition, Grinder Gearworks became "Wonder Woman: Lasso Of Truth" and Atom Smasher was renamed "The Flash: Speed Force".

In August 2011, several media sources reported that Six Flags New England would install Six Flags Magic Mountain's Déjà Vu for the park's 2012 season.

On September 1, 2011, Six Flags Magic Mountain announced that they would be opening a new attraction for the 2012 season named Lex Luthor: Drop of Doom. The free-fall drop attraction was integrated into both sides of the park's 415 feet (126 m) tall Superman: Escape from Krypton tower structure and ranks as the world's tallest drop tower, featuring a plummet from 400 feet (120 m) above ground level. The following day, Six Flags Magic Mountain confirmed on Facebook that Déjà Vu would be removed from the park. In September 2011, the park announced that Déjà Vu would be removed after October 16, 2011, "Déjà Vu fans, we have created some exclusive after-hours ride time for you to ride it again before October 16."

On October 31, 2011, Log Jammer operated for the last time and was removed to make way for Full Throttle, which opened in 2013.

In August 2012, Six Flags Magic Mountain confirmed rumors that a new roller coaster, Full Throttle, would open the following season. Full Throttle opened as the park's 18th roller coaster, allowing Six Flags Magic Mountain to market having the most roller coasters in the world once again. The ride was built to feature the world's tallest vertical loop on a roller coaster at 160 feet (49 m). Full Throttle set a record for being the first roller coaster to feature a track section with rails on both sides of the spine. This occurs at the top of the ride's massive inversion.

In August 2013, Six Flags Magic Mountain announced that they would run both Batman: The Ride and Colossus backwards for a limited time of the 2014 season. They will also expand Bugs Bunny World with the addition of a new roller coaster. On April 8, 2014, Six Flags Magic Mountain announced that the park will host its first ever Holiday in the Park Christmas event in late 2014 and for future years after.

In the summer of 2014, the park placed banners across the property advertising the Bonzai Pipelines in the adjacent property, Hurricane Harbor, along with the closing of Colossus which took place on August 16, 2014. On August 28, 2014, Six Flags announced the Rocky Mountain Construction conversion of Colossus into Twisted Colossus. Twisted Colossus opened on May 23, 2015.

In September 2015, Six Flags announced the renovation of Revolution with a new paint scheme, upgraded lighting, and new train eliminating the controversial over-the-shoulder restraints that had been the source of the ride's spotty reputation for much of its life. Named "The New Revolution", the roller coaster reopened on April 21, 2016.

In September 2016, the park announced Justice League: Battle for Metropolis to open in 2017. The 4D shooting dark ride is nearly identical to the six other installations located at Six Flags parks around North America. The ride opened on July 12, 2017, and is located in the Metropolis section near The Riddler's Revenge.

In August 2017, Six Flags announced the addition of a Zamperla Giga Discovery flat ride to be built in a newly renovated Boardwalk Beach area near DC Universe. Marketed as "the world's tallest pendulum ride", CraZanity takes riders to a height of 172 feet (52 m) and speeds up to 75 miles per hour (121 km/h).

In August 2018, the park announced the brand new racing launch coaster West Coast Racers from Premier Rides and a revamp of the old Cyclone Bay area into a high-energy, urban Los Angeles. The ride is dubbed the first launched racing coaster in the world and the first quadruple-launched coaster, even though the existing Fiorano GT Challenge holds these records. The Möbius loop coaster opened to the public in January 2020, and became the 19th coaster at the park.

In March 2019, the park announced that Green Lantern: First Flight would permanently close and be removed from the park, which no longer makes West Coast Racers the park's 20th coaster.

On March 13, 2020, the park closed due to the COVID-19 pandemic. The theme park reopened on April 1, 2021, with Members and Passholders being granted access on April 1 and 2, with the general public being admitted to the park on April 3. As of August 2021, Six Flags Magic Mountain visitors are no longer required to wear masks outdoors.

In October 2021, the park announced Wonder Woman Flight of Courage, the world's tallest and fastest single rail coaster, to open in summer 2022. The ride is an I-Box Raptor coaster built by Rocky Mountain Construction.

Starting November 1, 2022, the 365-day schedule, introduced in 2018 to "maximize travel industry opportunities", was limited to select weekends only during non-peak months. Park Marketing & Communications Publicist Alexandria French said in a statement that the changed operation schedule would deliver a more "exceptional guest experience".

In Spring 2023, Scream Break debuted at Magic Mountain, as well as Six Flags Over Texas, Six Flags Fiesta Texas, Six Flags Over Georgia, Six Flags Discovery Kingdom, Six Flags America, and Six Flags Great Adventure. The event lasted from March 18 to April 16 on Fridays, Saturdays and Sundays except for April 1–9. Hosted in the areas of DC Universe, Screampunk District, Full Throttle Plaza, and Six Flags Plaza, the event featured aspects of Fright Fest, such as themed props, shows, and mazes. Admission was available free for passholders on a first come, first served basis.

In early 2024, demolition work began on the Golden Bear Theater, Formerly Showcase Theater. After an incident at a TLC concert in the 90s, the theater sat dormant with the exception of the occasional regional cheer championship or religious gathering. In a November 2024 press release, Six Flags Magic Mountain publicly announced that a new 'Thrill Glider' Vekoma roller coaster, (currently under construction), was set to open in 2026, and would be built in and around the remnants of the Golden Bear Theater.

On March 28, 2025, it was announced that Six Flags Magic Mountain would close Superman: Escape from Krypton forever. According to the park president, the reason for the ride's closure was due to high maintenance costs and the difficulty of acquiring parts for the aging attraction.

On December 16, 2025, it was announced that Bugs Bunny World and Whistlestop Park will be permanently closed to make way for a new land, Looney Tunes Land at Six Flags Magic Mountain, and divided into TAZ–Mania, Road Runner Ridge, Bugs Bunny Play Park and Camp Duck Amuck, which debuted on June 6, 2026.

In July 2026, within six days of one another two women who rode X2 suffered from similar brain hemorrhages. Surgeons wrote that the severe brain injuries "were the result of a traumatic rapid acceleration-deceleration event experienced while on the X2 ride." Subsequent reporting revealed that X2 has been linked to more than a dozen reports of serious injuries and hospitalizations over nearly two decades, including riders who suffered life-altering disabilities, fell into comas and two who died of their injuries. Cal/OSHA is investigating and the ride remained closed since the second woman was hospitalized. On September 29, Six Flags announced that the closure would be permanent, stating their "purpose is to create FUN, thrills and a lifetime of memories by creating unforgettable experiences that are underpinned by comprehensive safety policies" while also stating that X2 had passed safety tests.

== Themed areas ==
There are presently twelve separately themed areas within the park – each zone featuring its own distinct rides, attractions, and food service venues.

Area	Picture	Description
DC Universe		The rides and attractions in this area are inspired by the DC comics universe.
Screampunk District		Themed to a steampunk carnival.
Looney Tunes Land		Feature rides and attractions inspired by Looney Tunes characters.
Full Throttle Plaza		Extreme sports and outdoor lifestyle inspired theming.
Six Flags Plaza		The main entry and exit of the park. Features gift shops, food service venues, photo services, and guest relations.
Baja Ridge		South of the border themed desert landscape and architecture.
Rapids Camp Crossing		This area simulates a campsite set deep in the American wilderness.
The Underground		Themed to race cars, stunts, & extreme lifestyle.
Metropolis		The rides and attractions in this area are inspired by the Justice League of the DC comics universe. Features the Hall of Justice.
Samurai Summit		Japanese folklore and mythology themed area.
The Boardwalk		Themed to an ocean boardwalk featuring carnival games and attractions.
Pirates Cove		Themed to pirates, myths, and legends.

== Cinema, television, and computer games ==
Magic Mountain's proximity to downtown Los Angeles, the hub of the American film and television industry, has resulted in its appearance in several productions, usually representing a park other than itself. The debut of Revolution was the focal point of the 1977 release Rollercoaster. Bob Einstein, as his character Super Dave Osborne, performed his first "stunt" on a roller coaster at Magic Mountain. In 1983, Magic Mountain became the fictional "Walley World" for National Lampoon's Vacation, with scenes featuring Revolution and Colossus, each using fictional names.

On television, Magic Mountain doubled as the theme park in the opening credits of the television series Step by Step. Other television productions featuring Magic Mountain have included: NCIS, Entourage, The Bionic Woman, The A-Team, CHiPs, Wonder Woman, Way Out Games, Knight Rider, Beverly Hills, 90210, Melrose Place, The King of Queens, Fresh Off the Boat, and Buffy the Vampire Slayer. The band Kiss filmed their acting debut in 1978's made-for-TV Kiss Meets the Phantom of the Park that featured the band members in the park and near Colossus. In the 2000 film Space Cowboys, Donald Sutherland is shown riding Viper and is portrayed as the designer when Clint Eastwood recruits him.

Magic Mountain's Showcase Theatre was the filming location for the video game-themed game show The Video Game from September 1984 to September 1985.

Magic Mountain was also the filming location for the children's educational video series Real Wheels episode "Here Comes A Roller Coaster", with host Dave Hood, which was released in 1995.

Magic Mountain was used as a filming site for the 1990 Kidsongs video, "Ride the Roller Coaster".

Colossus was filmed as the Serpent in the 1993 film, My Life.

Colossus was used for filming for the 1995 Muppets video, Muppets on Wheels.

In the Nickelodeon show Drake & Josh, Drake, Josh, and Megan take a trip to Mystic Mountain (parody of Magic Mountain) in the episode "The Demonator", and they ride the "Demonator" roller coaster. Mystic Mountain was also featured in the Zoey 101 episode "Rollercoaster" (as both series were created by Dan Schneider), where Zoey and Lisa take Michael to the park to help him overcome his roller coaster fear. He rides the "Spine Twister", which was actually the Goliath from Magic Mountain.

In 1990, Nickelodeon's Wild and Crazy Kids, the wooden roller coaster, Colossus, was featured as a game called "Wacky RollerCoaster Spill". In the 1984 film This Is Spinal Tap, the band performs as second billing to a puppet show at the fictional "Themeland Amusement Park" in Stockton, California, located 300 miles (480 km) north of Santa Clarita. The actual filming location is Magic Mountain's amphitheater.

The Kidsongs video Ride the Roller Coaster is set at Six Flags Magic Mountain. Nick Cannon group The School Gyrls movie premiere was at Magic Mountain. Six Flags Magic Mountain and its coaster Goliath are featured in the 2011 film Judy Moody and the Not Bummer Summer. Goliath was also featured as the "Aquaman" roller coaster in the third season of the HBO series Entourage.

In 2011, the park was chosen as the setting for the Travel Channel's version of the quiz show Scream! If You Know the Answer. The Glee cast visited the park in 2012 for their senior skip day in the "Big Brother" episode, where they ride Viper.

In 2013, a large section of the parking lot was blocked off for a Toyota Camry commercial. Both pictures and the background footage reveal Goliath and Colossus, indicating that it is Magic Mountain where the commercial was shot. The ride that was built for the commercial bears a resemblance to the park's new coaster at the time, Full Throttle: a big hill, a barrier-test loop, a backwards propulsion section, and a forwards propulsion section that runs through a tunnel placed next to the hill.

In 2013, the Nickelodeon TV show Sam & Cat featured an episode about the protagonists organizing a day at Mystic Mountain (the same park featured in Drake & Josh and Zoey 101), although the park was never filmed this time.

In 2016, Goliath was used for a Carpool Karaoke segment with Selena Gomez.

In 2017, the park and Full Throttle were used in the filming of the music video for Katy Perry's "Chained to the Rhythm".

In 2017, areas of the park were used in the filming of the Netflix comedy film Sandy Wexler starring Adam Sandler.

In 2021, some areas of the park were used in the filming of the Netflix comedy film Yes Day.

Although the park is not featured, Magic Mountain is mentioned numerous times in the Netflix horror-comedy Santa Clarita Diet.

A recreation of Magic Mountain was featured built in the computer game RollerCoaster Tycoon 2, including both a blank version of the park with no rides and attractions and a version of the park as it stood at the game's release in 2002, albeit missing both Batman: The Ride and the Riddler's Revenge.

== Attractions ==
=== Roller coasters ===
Current name	Picture	Year opened	Manufacturer	Park area	Thrill/intensity rating	Description
Apocalypse: The Ride		2009	Great Coasters International	The Underground	Maximum	Wooden roller coaster featuring steeply banked turns and twisting drops
Batman: The Ride		1994	Bolliger & Mabillard	DC Universe	Maximum	An inverted coaster that whips around steeply banked turns and five inversions.
Canyon Cruiser		1999	E&F Miler Industries	Looney Tunes Land	Mild	Junior roller coaster. Themed to Wile E. Coyote and the Road Runner from the Looney Tunes franchise, and guests ride on ACME-themed mining cars.
Full Throttle		2013	Premier Rides	Full Throttle Plaza	Maximum	A launch roller coaster with 2 forward launches and one backwards launch. Full Throttle has one of the world's tallest vertical loops at 160 feet (49 m) and the first ever "top hat" constructed on an inversion.
Gold Rusher		1971	Arrow Development	BoardWalk	Moderate	Riders dip, turn, and dive up and around the park's mountainous terrain. Gold Rusher was Six Flags Magic Mountain's first roller coaster.
Goliath		2000	Giovanola	Pirates Cove	Maximum	Riders brave an opening drop of 255 feet (78 m) into a subterranean tunnel and multiple steep banking turns.
Ninja		1988	Arrow Dynamics	Samurai Summit	Moderate	Swinging coaches suspended from an overhead steel track whip around steeply banked turns and curves in and out of the treetops.
The Great American Revolution		1976	Anton Schwarzkopf	Baja Ridge	Moderate	Riders careen through steep banking turns and spirals in and out of the treetops. Revolution has a full 360 degree loop which is the first modern vertical loop in the world.
The Riddler's Revenge		1998	Bolliger & Mabillard	Metropolis	Maximum	It is the tallest, fastest, longest stand-up coaster in the world. Riders traverse six inverted turns over the course of its 4,370-foot-long (1,330 m) track.
Road Runner Express		2011	Vekoma	Looney Tunes Land	Moderate	Junior roller coaster. Formerly operated at Six Flags New Orleans under the name Rex's Rail Runner from 2000 to 2002 and Road Runner Express from 2003 to 2005.
Scream		2003	Bolliger & Mabillard	Screampunk District	Maximum	Floorless trains riding above the rails traverse seven inversions on 3,985 feet (1,215 m) of steel track.
Tatsu		2006	Bolliger & Mabillard	Samurai Summit	Maximum	Upon opening, Tatsu was the tallest, fastest, and longest flying roller coaster in the world. Suspended beneath a steel track, riders experience a total of 263 feet (80 m) in elevation changes while harnessed in a prone position. It also features the world's largest pretzel loop.
Twisted Colossus		2015	Rocky Mountain Construction	Screampunk District	Maximum	Riders experience steep drops, banking curves, and two inversions on nearly 5,000 feet (1,500 m) of track – designed to pit two simultaneously operating trains in a race against each other. It is also the world's longest racing coaster.
Viper		1990	Arrow Dynamics	Baja Ridge	Maximum	188 feet (57 m) tall with seven inversions reaching speeds up to 70 mph (110 km/h)
West Coast Racers		2020	Premier Rides	The Underground	Maximum	Quadruple launch racing coaster, in partnership with West Coast Customs.
Wonder Woman Flight of Courage		2022	Rocky Mountain Construction	DC Universe	Maximum	World's tallest and fastest single-rail roller coaster when it opened in July 2022.
ArieForce One		2028	Rocky Mountain Construction	TBA	Maximum	A steel roller coaster originally located at Fun Spot America Atlanta. It will be relocated to Six Flags Magic Mountain for the 2028 season.

=== Other ===
Attraction	Picture	Year opened	Manufacturer	Park area	Thrill/intensity rating	Description
Buccaneer		1980	Intamin	Pirates Cove	Moderate	Swinging pirate ship ride.
Circuit Breaker Grand Prix		1992	J & J Amusements	The Underground	Mild	Go-Kart attraction. Requires nominal fee for participation. Formerly known as Cyclone 500 (1992-2018) and Pacific Speedway (2020-2023). Gained electric cars in 2024.
CraZanity	Crazanity	2018	Zamperla	BoardWalk	Maximum	A Zamperla Giga Discovery. Pendulum ride. 172 feet (52 m) high. 75 miles per hour (121 km/h). Tallest pendulum ride in the world.
Dive Devil		1996	SkyCoaster Inc.	The Underground	Maximum	Large swing attraction simulating the experience of sky diving. Requires nominal fee for participation.
Grand American Carousel		1971	Philadelphia Toboggan Coasters	Six Flags Plaza	Mild	A merry-go-round called PTC #21 with origins beginning in 1912. It was removed in the 1960s from the Savin Rock Amusement area in West Haven, Connecticut and sold to Magic Mountain. Grand Carousel is a family friendly ride located in the Six Flags Plaza area.
Magic Mover		1971	Korneuberg Shipbuilding Company (Austria) & Intamin	Six Flags Plaza / Samurai Summit	Mild	1,000 mm (3 ft 3 3/8 in) metre gauge funicular railway ride, which transports guests to Samurai Summit next to Ninja. Repainted in 2016 to blue/white in conjunction with Honda sponsorship. Previously known from 1988 – 2016 as Orient Express and from 1971 to 1988 as Funicular.
Jammin' Bumpers		1971	Reverchon	Boardwalk	Moderate	Bumper cars.
Jet Stream		1972	Arrow Development	The Underground	Moderate	Flume ride. First Arrow flume to use a turntable loading system. Known from 2001 to 2006 as Arrowhead Splashdown. Jet Stream is a family friendly flume ride located near the entrance to Gold Rusher. The ride opened in 1972.
Justice League: Battle for Metropolis	Justice League Battle for Metropolis	2017	Sally Corporation	Metropolis	Moderate	An interactive 4D shooting family dark ride.
Lex Luthor: Drop of Doom		2012	Intamin	DC Universe	Maximum	Free fall drop thrill ride from a height of 400 ft (122 m), attaining a terminal velocity of 85 mph (137 km/h). The ride is the world's tallest drop tower between 2012 and 2014 and since 2025.
Roaring Rapids		1981	Intamin	Rapids Camp Crossing	Moderate	Rapids water attraction simulating a wilderness raft expedition. Many guests claim it is the best water ride at the park.
Swashbuckler		1983	Chance Rides	Pirates Cove	Moderate	Chance Yo-Yo attraction.
Teen Titans Turbo Spin		1974	Hrubetz	DC Universe	Moderate	First known as Electric Rainbow between 1974 and 1986, then Turbo between 1987 and 1993, then Gordon Gearworks between 1994 and 1998, then Grinder Gearworks between 1998 and 2011. And finally Wonder Woman Lasso of Truth from 2012 to 2021.

== Former rides and attractions ==
=== Roller coasters ===
Ride	Year Opened	Year Closed	Manufacturer	Description
Colossus	1978	2014	International Amusement Devices	A dueling wooden coaster with two tracks, famous for appearing in National Lampoon's Vacation. Redesigned after August 2014 as Twisted Colossus, a converted hybrid coaster.
Déjà Vu	2001	2011	Vekoma	Located in Cyclone Bay, it was known as the world's largest inverted coaster. Consisted of a floorless train suspended beneath an overhead track that would traverse the track forward and in reverse. Removed and relocated to Six Flags New England, where it reopened in 2012 as Goliath before it was demolished in 2021.
Flashback	1992	2003	Intamin	Steel roller coaster featuring a stacked design and numerous steep rolling track dives. After the addition of Hurricane Harbor, the coaster operated sporadically, largely during the winter season. The Flashback was standing but not operating starting in 2003 and demolished and scrapped in December 2007. In 2013, Hurricane Harbor expanded into the former site of the coaster by placing additional cabanas.
Green Lantern: First Flight	2011	2017	Intamin	The second 4th Dimension roller coaster installed at the park following X2, and the first ZacSpin model from Intamin in the United States. It was removed in 2019 and moved to La Ronde, where it was set to reopen as Vipère in 2020, but the project was cancelled in 2022 following multiple delays.
Mountain Express	1973	1982	Anton Schwarzkopf	Wildcat coaster located where Flashback would be placed ten years later after its closure. Relocated to Magic Landing as Wildcat and then to Bosque Magico as Montana Rusa.
Psyclone	1991	2006	Dinn Corporation	A wood tracked roller coaster patterned after the Cyclone at Astroland park in Brooklyn, New York. It was torn down for the 2007 season, and piles of wood remained at the site for many days after the destruction. The site is now home to another wooden coaster, Apocalypse.
Sarajevo Bobsleds	1984	1986	Intamin	Bobsled coaster named after the 1984 Winter Olympics. Removed due to the Six Flags ride rotation program and replaced with Shockwave. It was moved to Six Flags Over Texas and opened as Avalanche, but was later renamed and rethemed as La Vibora to better match the Spain section of the park.
Shockwave	1986	1988	Intamin	A steel standup looping roller coaster. It was removed in 1989 and relocated to Six Flags Great Adventure due to the ride rotation program. It relocated to Six Flags AstroWorld in 1993, but after the park closed, it has been placed in storage at Darien Lake, but was not rebuilt.
Superman: Escape from Krypton	1997	2024	Intamin	First roller coaster to exceed 400 feet (120 m) in height. Riders accelerate in reverse from 0 to 104 mph (167 km/h) in seven seconds and climb nearly 41 stories into the air. It was previously known as Superman: The Escape (1997–2010).
Magic Flyer	1971	2026	Bradley and Kaye	Train themed Junior roller coaster. Closed as of January 2026 to develop Bugs Bunny World into Looney Tunes Land.
Speedy Gonzales Hot Rod Racers	2014	2026	Zamperla	Race-car themed Zamperla family gravity coaster with helix.
X²	2002	2026	Arrow Dynamics	Riders experience predetermined forward and reverse somersaulting maneuvers while harnessed in seats that pitch on a separate axis from the track. It was the world's first 4D coaster. Permanently closed in light of brain injury claims/lawsuits.

=== Other rides and attractions ===
Ride	Year Opened	Year Closed	Manufacturer	Description
99 Steam Train	1971	1981	Crown Metal Products	The 2 ft (610 mm) narrow gauge train ride to Trollywood, the troll country.
Billy the Squid	1971	1973	Anton Schwarzkopf	Polyp Ride. In 1973 this Polyp ride had a maintenance problem and was removed. The Jolly Monster was built on its site.
Circus Wheel	1971	1999	Chance Rides	Chance Trabant with Roman theming. It spun in a clockwise direction and tilted at the same time. The Trabant was removed and replaced with a Tilt-A-Whirl, retaining the Circus Wheel name.
Circus Wheel	1981	2008	Sellner Manufacturing	This Sellner Tilt-A-Whirl was known in the past under the names Fiesta Dance 1981-1981; Baile de las Flores 1982–1988 and Jolly Roger 1988–1999. The Tilt-A-Whirl was removed to make room for 3-Point Challenge basketball game. Tilt-A-Whirl has been in storage in a boneyard.
Condor	1988	1989	Huss Rides	This Huss Condor was open for two years before being removed. It was removed to make room for Viper.
Crazy Barrels	1971	1989	Intamin	This Intamin Drunken Barrels was formerly located at a county fair. The Barrels were removed when the ride closed in 1989 and the platform for where the ride used to be was demolished in late 2017.
Dragon	1974	1981	Arrow Development	This transportation cable railway transported riders from the upper level of the back of the mountain down to the lower level, and vice versa. The ride ceased operation in 1981 but was not removed until Ninja was built in 1988. Parts of the upper station were reused for Ninja, The Dragon's concrete track, wall, and lower station are visible to the left of Ninja's final lift hill.
Eagles Flight – El Dorado	1971	1981	Intamin	This Intamin aerial sky-way ride took passengers from the upper part of the mountain to the lower land on the western side of the mountain. The course was removed in 1981 and the loading station was replaced by Freefall in 1982.
Eagles Flight – Galaxy	1971	1994	Intamin	A second aerial sky-way ride from the top of the mountain to the northern lower land in the County Fair area. The ride was closed due to impacts from the 1994 Northridge earthquake. Galaxy's station was located where the base of the Superman: Escape from Krypton tower structure sits today.
El-Bumpo	1971	1979	Arrow Development	Gas-powered bumper boats located on a pond. Once located where Justice League: Battle for Metropolis sits today.
Freefall	1982	2008	Intamin	Once located in the middle of The Riddler's Revenge, it was the first installation of Intamin's first-generation drop tower. The ride would barely operate between 2005 – 2007; however, it was scrapped for the 2008 season.
Galaxy	1971	1979	Intamin	A double Ferris wheel with cable pulley that looked like a V-shaped beam. The ride was removed and was located where Buccaneer and Swashbuckler are now sitting. It was scrapped after removal.
Grand Centennial Excursion Railroad	1975	1985		A 3 ft (914 mm) narrow gauge steam train that took passengers around. Located west of the main mountain.
Granny Gran Prix	1971	2007	D. H. Morgan	Once located where Tidal Wave (Six Flags Magic Mountain) once sat, this track-guided car ride was known as Chevron Gran Prix (Gas Powered) from 1971 to 1986. A new turnpike (electric-powered) was opened for three years before being moved in 1988 to Bugs Bunny World where it remained until December 2007 when it was demolished to make room for Thomas Town's opening in 2008.
Jolly Monster	1973	1981	Eyerly	A standard Eyerly Monster ride which replaced Billy the Squid. This thrill ride was at the Pirate's Cove near Colossus, Buccaneer, and Swashbuckler. The ride was removed and its site sat empty for 7 years before the Tilt-A-Whirl was moved there.
Little Sailor Ride	1971	1985		Yankee Doodle Dandy (1971–1972) Sailboat Ride (1973–1980) Little Sailor Ride (1981–1985)
Log Jammer	1971	2011	Arrow Development	Log flume featuring two large drops. Removed to make way for Full Throttle. Its loading station can still be found in the park right across from the Full Throttle Sports Bar.
Magic Pagoda	1974	1984		A walk-thru attraction located on Samurai Summit. It featured a talking Buddha, a mirror maze, a strobe light room (with a dragon flying overhead), a walk through a miniature version of Chinatown and various other small scale items of interest with a Chinese Theme. Now used as part of a walk-through maze for the Halloween season.
Metro	1971	2001	Universal Mobility	This monorail ride ran three stations; one at the High Sierra Territory (Demolished, now serves as Reds Revenge Haunted Maze during Frightfest), one at the Colossus County Fair (Demolished in 2017 to make room for the CraZanity Pendulum ride) and one at Samurai Summit (this station is currently used as the launch tunnel for Full Throttle). The monorail had been standing but not operating since 2001 and it was announced by Six Flags in 2007 that the ride would have no plans to reopen. The trains were located right next to the former location of Flashback where they sat for 10 years. In 2011, the monorail trains are relocated to Hersheypark. The abandoned track has been taken down in all areas readily visible to parkgoers but sections of track still exist and may be glimpsed in heavily overgrown sections of the park such as the area behind Buccaneer and Swashbuckler.
Reactor	1977	1993	Anton Schwarzkopf	A Schwarzkopf Enterprise, known from 1977 to 1987 as Enterprise, was renamed Reactor in 1987. This thrill ride was removed at the end of the 1993 season.
Scrambler	1973	2003	Eli Bridge	This scrambler had a lot of damage from an uprooted tree and was scrapped; however, Six Flags Magic Mountain received another scrambler from Six Flags Over Texas.
Scrambler	2003	2024	Eli Bridge	The park's former old Scrambler was damaged from an uprooted tree. This Scrambler was relocated from Six Flags Over Texas.
Sierra Twist	1973	2008	Anton Schwarzkopf	A Schwarzkopf Bayern Kurve ride, originally known as Swiss Twist. It was a high-speed bobsled ride with a circular track. The ride was removed due to aging parts and high maintenance costs.
Sky Tower	1971	2014	Intamin	Observation tower, closed in 2014 due to safety issues with the ride's elevator.
Sling Shot	2012	2019	Funtime	Sling Shot extra charge attraction. Last operated in December 2019 and never reopened due to maintenance costs. Demolition started on September 1, 2022.
Spin Out	1971	2008	Chance Rides	A Chance Rotor known from 1971 to 1972 as Bottoms Up. Featured in the video for Belinda Carlisle's No. 1 hit song, "Heaven is a Place on Earth"
Thrill Shot	2001	2012	S&S Worldwide	Rapidly ascending slingshot attraction. The ride requires a nominal fee from guests to participate. Thrill Shot closed in 2009 and never reopened due to high maintenance costs. In early 2012, Thrill Shot was removed.
Tidal Wave	1989	2019	Intamin	Shoot the Chutes water ride which features a 50-foot (15.2 m) drop. Also featured a bridge that served as the exit but would also serve as the splash zone where people crossing the bridge would get soaked from head to toe. It last operated in 2019 and was removed from the park's website in 2021. The ride was removed in 2021 to make room for Wonder Woman Flight of Courage.
Tumble Drum	1974	1980		This walk-through barrel roll was located near the Electric Rainbow (Round up ride).
Yosemite Sam Sierra Falls	1993	2010	WhiteWater West Industries	Double tube waterslides with dingy raft on location at Bugs Bunny World. Demolished to make room for Road Runner Express.
Z-Force	1987	1993	Intamin	An Intamin Looping Starship/Space Shuttle themed as an Air Force fighter plane. The ride was removed at the end of the season in 1993 to make room for Batman: The Ride.

== Rankings ==
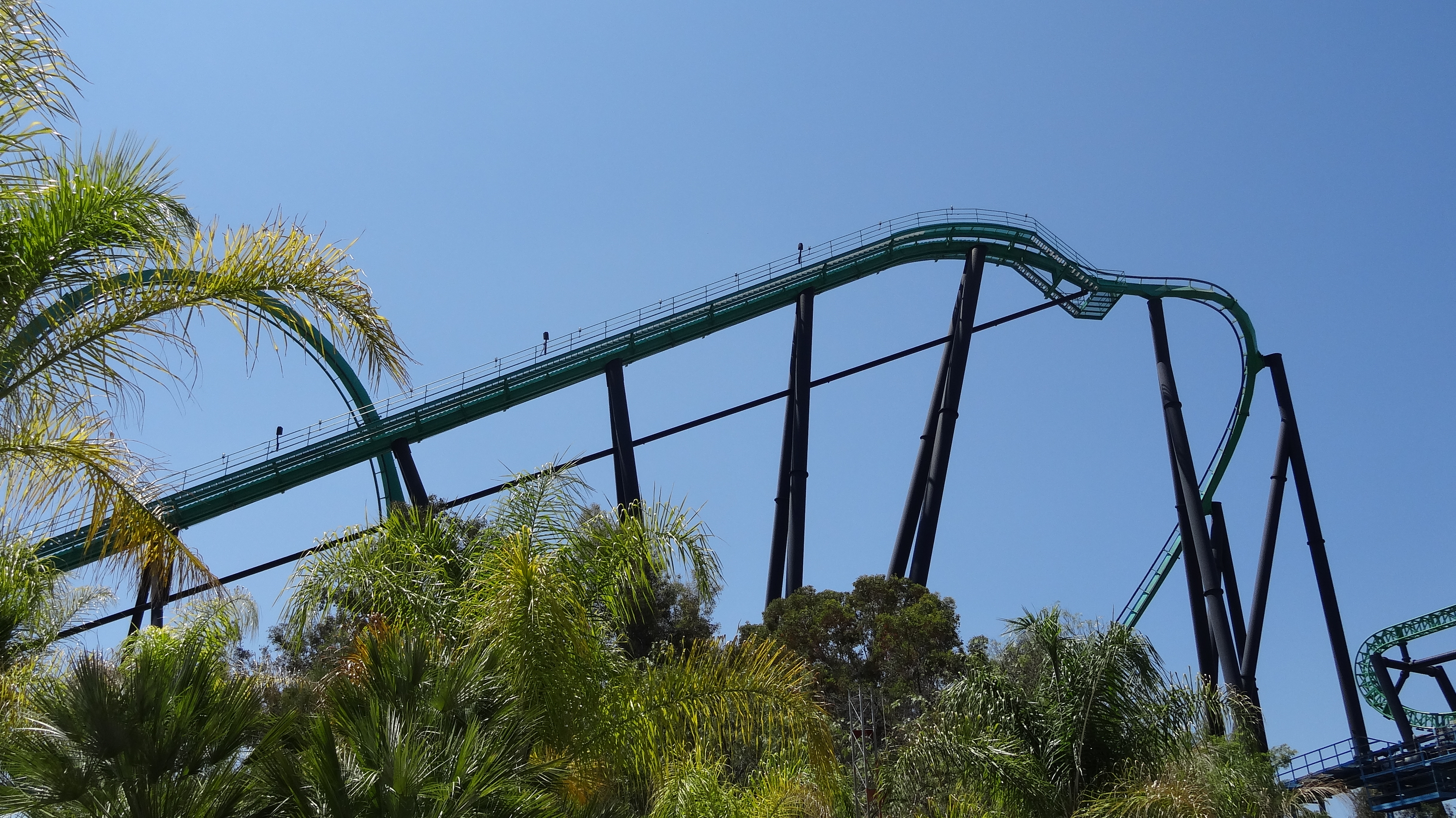
The Riddler's Revenge, the world's tallest and fastest stand-up roller coaster featuring six inversions.

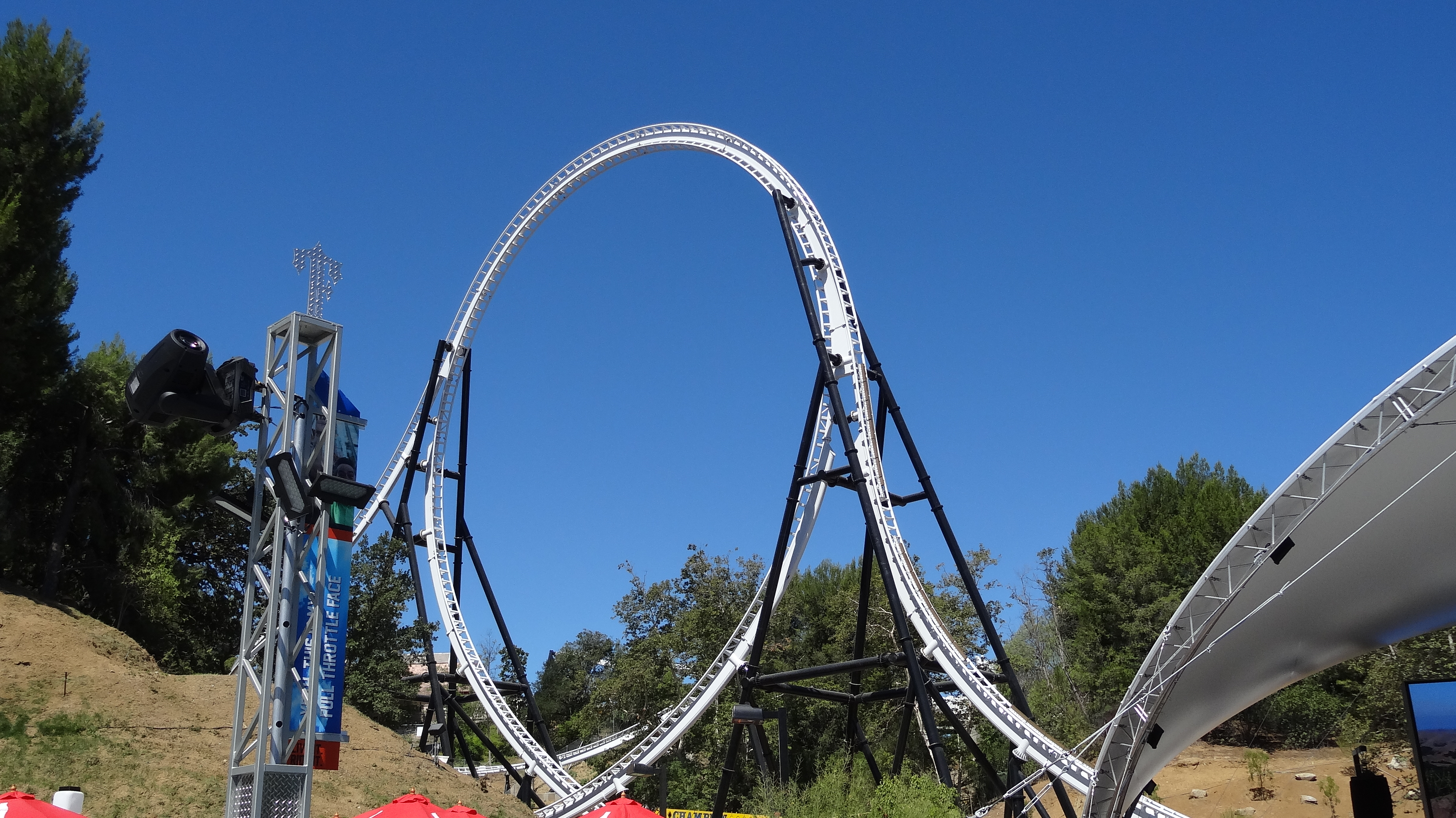
Full Throttle is a launch roller coaster which features the world's second highest vertical loop at 160 ft (49 m).

Six Flags Magic Mountain's coasters are commonly ranked high in Amusement Today's annual Golden Ticket Awards. With the opening of Full Throttle in June 2013, Six Flags Magic Mountain obtained the world record for the largest number of roller coasters in an amusement park.

Below is a table with roller coasters at Six Flags Magic Mountain and their highest ranking in the Golden Ticket Awards.

Roller Coaster	Highest Rank
X²	7
Tatsu	28
Goliath	14
Twisted Colossus	6
Full Throttle	39
The Riddler's Revenge	39
Batman: The Ride	22
Apocalypse: The Ride	27
Scream	52

=== Record breaking rides ===
Six Flags Magic Mountain has several attractions that set world records in various categories.

Ride	Type of ride	Opening Date	Record(s)	Height
The New Revolution	Steel roller coaster	May 8, 1976	First vertical looping roller coaster built since 1901. World's tallest roller coaster when it opened to the public.	113 ft (34 m)
Superman: Escape from Krypton	Shuttle roller coaster	Superman: The Escape: March 15, 1997 Superman: Escape from Krypton; March 19, 2011	One of the world's first 2 roller coasters to reach 100 miles per hour (160 km/h). First roller coaster to reach 400 ft (122 m). becoming the world's tallest coaster until 2003.	415 ft (126 m)
The Riddler's Revenge	Stand-up roller coaster	April 4, 1998	World's tallest, longest & fastest stand-up roller coaster.	156 ft (48 m)
Goliath	Steel roller coaster	February 11, 2000	World's longest & fastest initial drop (255 ft or 78 m) on a closed-circuit coaster until May 13, 2000.	235 ft (72 m)
X²	4th Dimension roller coaster	X: January 12, 2002; X²: May 24, 2008	World's first 4th dimension roller coaster. World's first coaster with wing seating. Features flipping seats, chainlift music, fog and fire.	175 ft (53 m)
Tatsu	Flying roller coaster	May 13, 2006	World's tallest, fastest & longest flying coaster. Features world's biggest pretzel loop.	170 ft (52 m)
Lex Luthor: Drop of Doom	Drop tower	July 7, 2012	World's tallest tower drop ride when it opened in 2012. Its record was broken by Zumanjaro: Drop of Doom in 2014, but regained its former record on November 10, 2024.	400 ft (122 m)
Full Throttle	Launched roller coaster	June 22, 2013	First launched roller coaster featuring "top hat" constructed on a vertical loop. World's highest vertical loop when built.	160 ft (49 m)
CraZanity	Pendulum ride	July 13, 2018	World's Tallest Pendulum Ride	172 ft (52 m)

== Attendance ==
Although Six Flags does not release attendance figures, the Themed Entertainment Association (TEA) and other theme park industry analyst companies estimate attendance numbers for the park.

Year	Attendance (millions)
2006	2.55
2007—2008	No data (Note: TEA did not report attendance figures in 2007, 2008, and 2010 because the park was not in the top 20 most attended North American parks those years.)
2009	2.50
2010	No data
2011	2.70
2012	2.81
2013	2.91
2014	2.85
2015	3.10
2016	3.33
2017	3.37
2018	3.59
2019	3.61
2020	0.69
2021	3.05
2022	2.99
2023	3.30
2024	3.31

== See also ==
- Incidents at Six Flags parks
