= Muskrat (disambiguation) =

A muskrat (Ondatra zibethicus) is a medium-sized semiaquatic rodent.

Muskrat may also refer to:

== Animals ==
- Barbudan muskrat (Megalomys audreyae), an extinct rodent formerly endemic to the island of Barbuda
- Martinique muskrat, an extinct rodent formerly endemic to the island of Martinique
- Round-tailed muskrat, a semiaquatic rodent native to Florida and Georgia in the United States
- Siberian muskrat, a shrew found across northern Asia

== Places ==
- Muskrat Dam, Ontario, a Native community in Ontario, Canada
- Muskrat Falls, a waterfall in Newfoundland and Labrador, Canada
- Muskrat Lake, Ontario, Canada
- Muskrat River (Ontario), Canada

== Fiction and popular culture ==
- "Muskrat" (song), a 1961 song by The Everly Brothers
- Muskie Muskrat, a character in the animated series Deputy Dawg
- Muskrat (G.I. Joe), a character in G.I. Joe: A Real American Hero
- ’’Muskrat Love’’, a 1973 rock ballad
- Muskrat Ramble, a 1926 jazz song
- Muskrat Magazine, a Canadian Indigenous arts and culture online magazine

== Other ==
- Muskrat French, an ethnic group in Michigan, the United States
- Muskrat Root, a type of fragrant herb
- Muskrat Scrambler, a roller coaster in New Orleans, the United States
- Muskrat v. United States, a 1911 legal case concerning sale of Native American lands
- Winnipesaukee Muskrats, a baseball team in New Hampshire, the United States
