= Muskrat Scrambler =

Former roller coaster

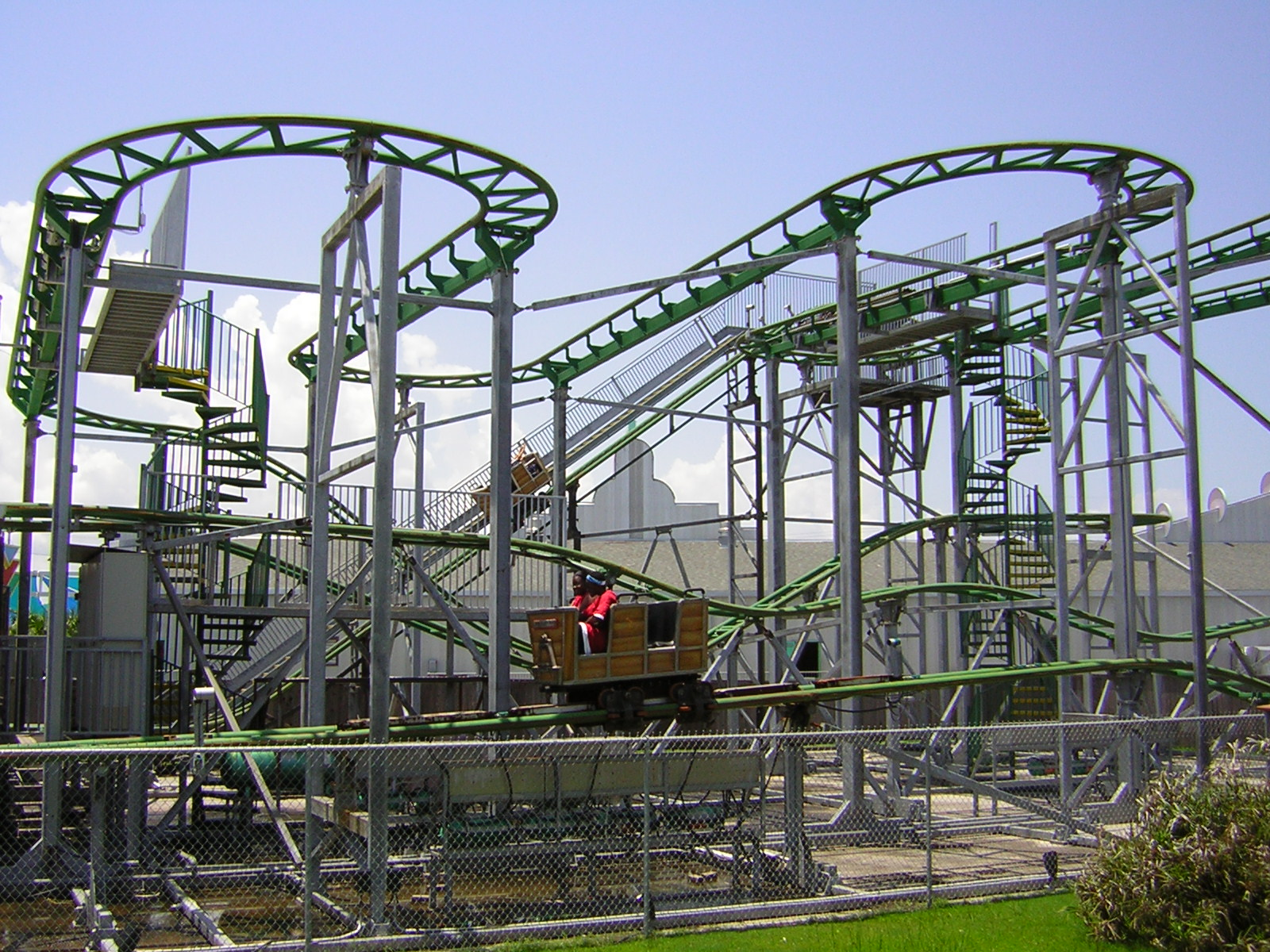

Six Flags New Orleans
- Location: Six Flags New Orleans
- Park section: Cajun Country
- Coordinates: 30.051463°N 89.935742°W
- Status: Removed
- Opening date: May 20, 2000
- Closing date: August 21, 2005

General statistics
- Type: Steel – Family – Wild Mouse
- Manufacturer: L&T Systems
- Model: Wild Mouse 30x20
- Track layout: Wild Mouse
- Lift/launch system: Chain lift hill
- Height: 47.6 ft (14.5 m)
- Length: 1,183.4 ft (360.7 m)
- Speed: 25 mph (40 km/h)
- Capacity: 700 riders per hour
- Height restriction: 48 in (122 cm)
- Trains: 8 trains with a single car; riders arranged 2 across in 2 rows for a total of 4 riders per train
- Muskrat Scrambler at RCDB

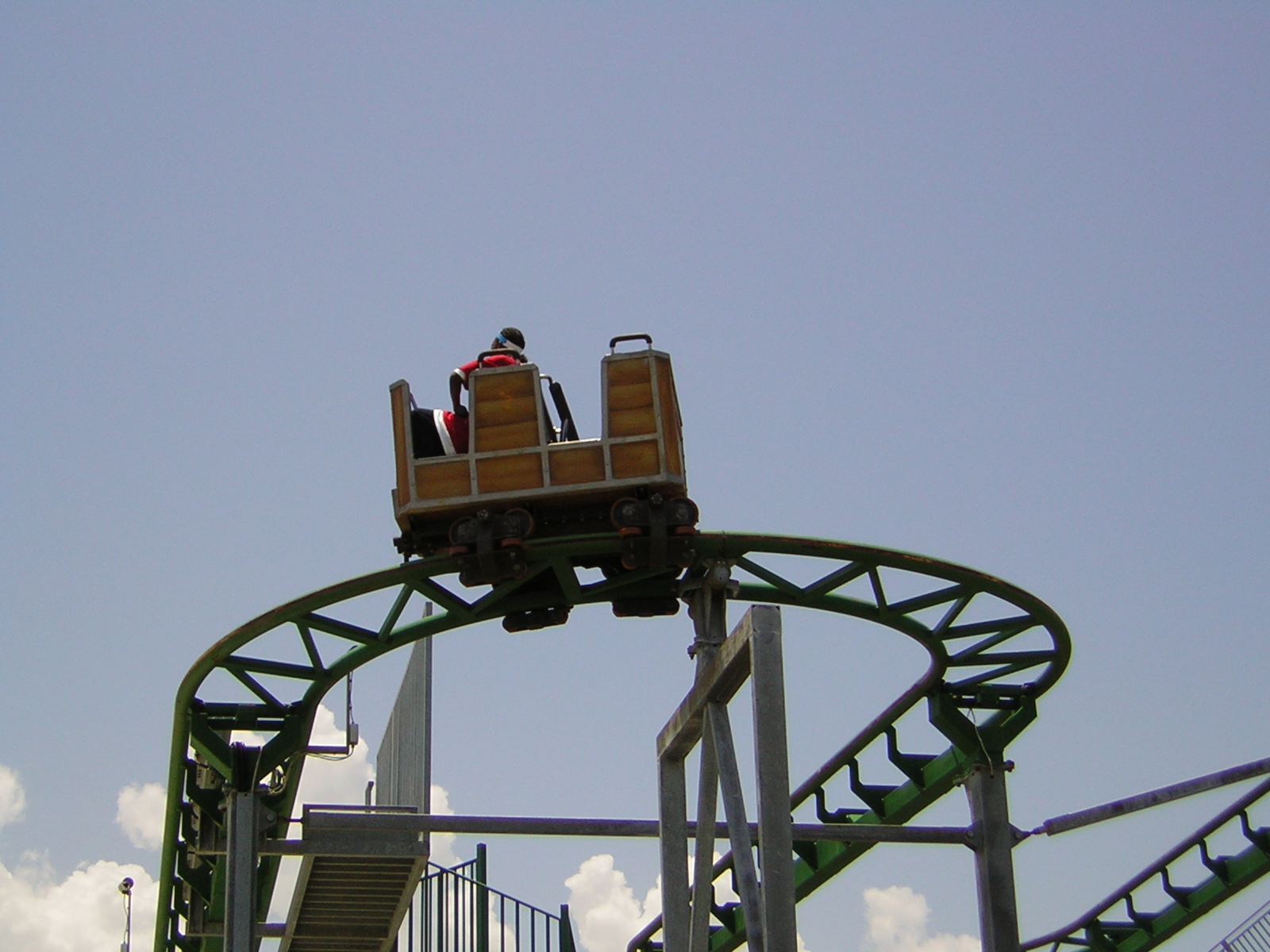
One of the ride's cars navigating the track.

Muskrat Scrambler was a steel roller coaster located at Six Flags New Orleans in Louisiana. The attraction was a "wild mouse" style coaster. The ride opened in the Jazzland section of the park on May 20, 2000. Following the devastation to the amusement park in August 2005 by Hurricane Katrina, the roller coaster ceased operation following the park's closure but remained standing until its demolition in 2024.

== History ==
Three years after Six Flags took control of the park, Hurricane Katrina devastated the surrounding area on August 29, 2005. In 2007, Six Flags started to remove rides from the park. Batman: The Ride was removed in 2007 and taken to Six Flags Fiesta Texas and reopened as Chupacabra in 2008. Bayou Blaster and Sonic Slam were removed in 2008 and taken to Great Escape and reopened as Sasquatch in 2009. The Road Runner Express was removed in 2009 and taken to Six Flags Magic Mountain and reopened in 2011 under the same name.

In 2014, two men were imprisoned over a counterfeit scheme to sell scrap metal from the park, including the Muskrat Scrambler.

The coaster remained standing until demolition works at the park began in 2024.
