= Six Flags New Orleans =

Theme park in New Orleans

- Previously known as Jazzland (2000–2002)

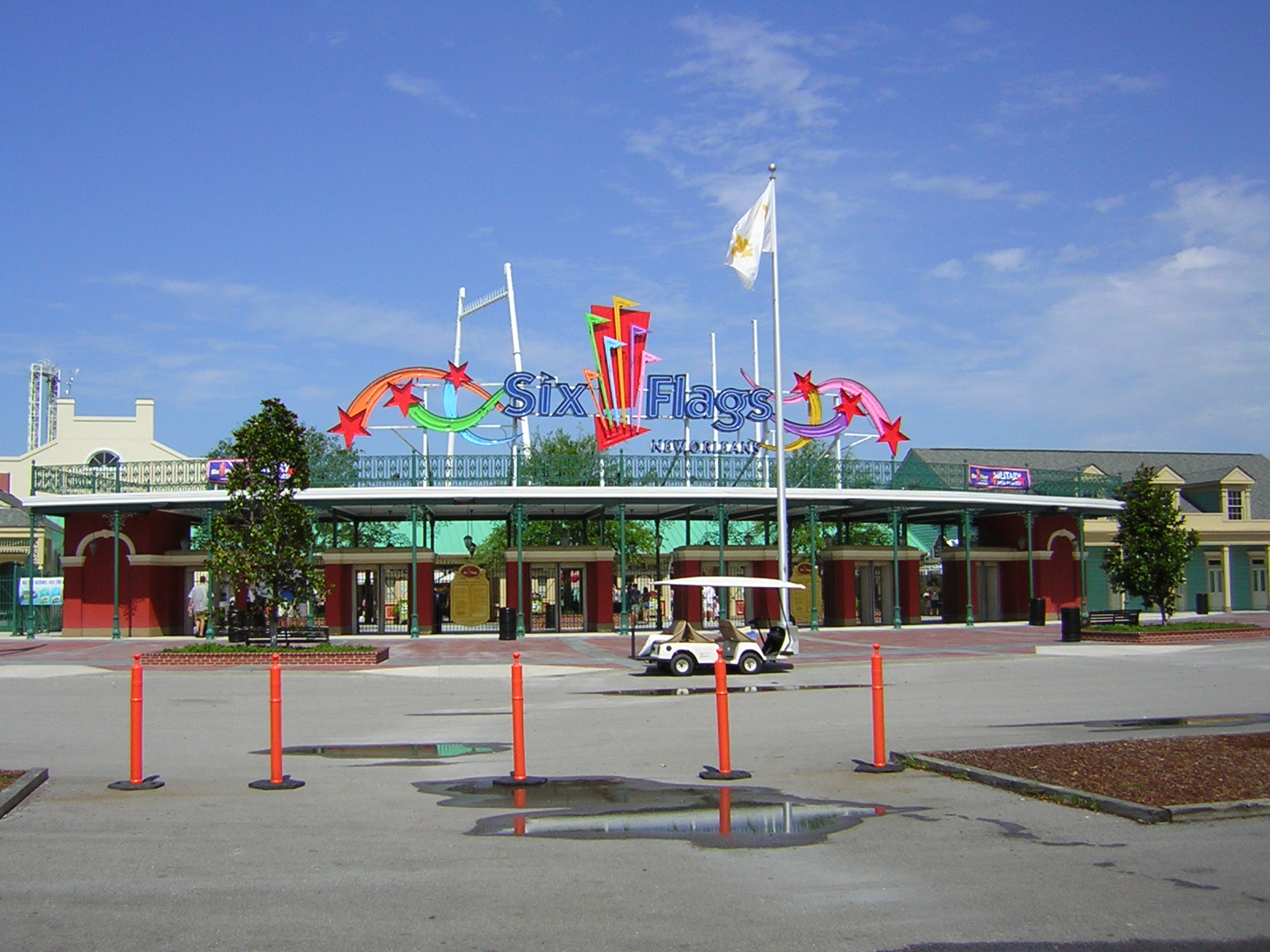
- Six Flags New Orleans' entrance in June 2004
- Interactive map of Six Flags New Orleans
- Location: New Orleans, Louisiana, U.S.
- Coordinates: 30°3′4.0″N 89°56′3.9″W
- Status: Defunct
- Opened: May 20, 2000 (as Jazzland); April 12, 2003 (as Six Flags New Orleans)
- Closed: August 21, 2005
- Owner: City of New Orleans
- Slogan: "Get your fill of thrills at Jazzland!" (2000–2002) "It's playtime!" (2003–2005)

Attractions
- Total: 27
- Roller coasters: 4
- Water rides: 2
- Website: Official website (archived)

Six Flags New Orleans was a theme park located near the interchange of Interstate 10 and Interstate 510 in New Orleans, Louisiana, United States. It first opened as Jazzland in 2000, and a 75-year lease agreement was established with Six Flags in 2002 following the previous operator's bankruptcy proceedings. Six Flags invested $20 million in upgrades, and the park reopened as Six Flags New Orleans in 2003. Following substantial damage caused by Hurricane Katrina in 2005, the park was closed to the public to make efforts to repair and reopen it. However, in 2006, Six Flags declared the property a total loss, and the park was permanently closed. The lease was terminated in 2009 during Six Flags' bankruptcy proceedings.

Six Flags salvaged several rides and relocated them to other parks. The Industrial Development Board (IDB) of New Orleans owns the property and oversees redevelopment plans. Following several failed proposals to redevelop the site, it remained abandoned and in poor condition. Videos and photos of the park emerged over the years online from urban explorers and YouTubers. As a result, city officials became more diligent in securing the park and banning tourists, tasking the New Orleans Police Department with patrolling the abandoned site and arresting trespassers. An option to demolish and clear the land was explored in 2019 following complaints from residents, which was estimated to cost the city $1.3 million.

In 2023, plans were approved by the city for Bayou Phoenix to begin redeveloping the land. In the meantime, the city continued to generate revenue from the property by occasionally leasing the park to various production companies as a filming location.

Demolition of the theme park began in early November 2024 and was mostly completed in 2026.

== Functioning theme park period, 2000–2005 ==
Themed areas within Jazzland / Six Flags New Orleans

Tom and Dian Winingder spent almost ten years arranging the partnership that would open Jazzland. In 1995, the developers solicited a loan from the United States Department of Housing and Urban Development (HUD), initially for $15 million, to complete the park. The partners included Burroughs & Chapin located in Myrtle Beach, South Carolina, which withdrew in 1997, and Ogden Corporation, which sold its theme park division to Alfa Alfa for $148 million in March 2000. The New Orleans City Council approved of its final master plan in April 1998, with the state of Louisiana providing funding in July 1998. The park is built on a concrete deck 4 ft (1.2 m) thick.

=== Jazzland (2000–2002) ===
The park opened under the name Jazzland on May 20, 2000; the crowd was estimated at 20–25,000 people, and 75–80,000 season passes had been sold. It was operated by Alfa SmartParks, a Greek holding company that purchased the Ogden Entertainment theme park division; the company has since changed hands and now is known as Palace Entertainment, owned by the Spanish company Parques Reunidos. The original themed areas were Mardi Gras, Pontchartrain Beach, Cajun Country, Jazz Plaza, Kids' Carnival, and The Goodtime Gardens; the first season ran until October 29, with season passes available for $89.99 (individual) or $219.96 (family of four). Rides included Mega Zeph, a wooden roller coaster track built on a steel frame to prevent termite infestation and withstand hurricane-force winds. Mega Zeph was inspired by the old Zephyr roller coaster at the closed Pontchartrain Beach Amusement Park that was next to Lake Pontchartrain by the University of New Orleans. The intent was to rebuild the Zephyr, but it was a smaller roller coaster, so that idea was scrapped in favor of the current larger Mega Zeph. Other rides included a junior steel coaster called Rex's Rail Runner, a wild mouse steel coaster, and a common steel shuttle looping Vekoma boomerang roller-coaster called Zydeco Scream. The park had a log flume called Cypress Plunge and a splashwater falls ride called Spillway Splashout. In addition, the park had common amusement park spinning rides and a carousel merry-go-round.

The park was not profitable, as Alfa SmartParks specialized in running water parks and smaller amusement arcade centers. It attracted 1.1 million visitors for its first season, but that decreased to 560 to 580 thousand the next season; Alfa filed for bankruptcy reorganization in February 2002. Citing its benefit to the local economy, HUD loaned $25.3 million to build the park, and after Alfa went bankrupt, the city of New Orleans became liable for the remainder of the loan. In 2001, the lease was put up for sale, and in March 2002 Six Flags purchased it for $22M, although the park's name did not change that year. The New Orleans city council approved the 75-year lease in August 2002; under the negotiated agreement, repayment of the remaining $24.4 million loan from HUD was to be split between the park ($1.4M/year) and the city ($1M/yr).

=== Six Flags New Orleans (2003–2005) ===
Six Flags spent $20 million to upgrade the park and reopened it on 5th April 2003 under the name Six Flags New Orleans. Six Flags added more shaded areas and many new flat spinning rides. The park was renamed Six Flags, and the "it's playtime!" theme was adopted, which included a dancing old man, Mr. Six. They added a Bolliger & Mabillard inverted coaster named Batman: The Ride (a mirrored version of the B&M Batman: The Ride coaster model) relocated from the defunct Thrill Valley in Japan, and a Vekoma multiple looping coaster called The Jester relocated from Six Flags Fiesta Texas. A water park that would be included in the admission (like Six Flags Parks such as Six Flags St. Louis and Six Flags America, for example) was in the planning stages in early 2005 and was going to be announced at the end of August. However, Hurricane Katrina was about to strike New Orleans, which put those plans and the continued operations of the park in question.

The last day the park operated was Sunday, August 21, 2005, eight days before Hurricane Katrina struck New Orleans. However, weekday operations had ended a couple of weeks earlier, as schools start early in August in the New Orleans area and end in mid-May. The park was scheduled to reopen for the weekend of August 27 and 28. However, once Katrina was forecast late on Friday, August 26, to hit New Orleans directly, the weekend reopening was canceled to prepare for the storm and begin evacuations. By the time the park closed in 2005, Six Flags had spent $44 million on park upgrades.

=== Themed areas ===
Immediately after entering the main gate on the east side of the park, guests were directed to (clockwise):

- Main Street Square (Formerly Jazz Plaza)
- Cajun Country
- Pontchartrain Beach
- DC Comics Super Heroes Adventures (park expansion, added by Six Flags in 2003)
- Mardi Gras
- Looney Tunes Adventures (Formerly Kids' Carnival)
- Goodtime Gardens

The park was built in a loop around Crescent City Basin; Pontchartrain Beach fronted Jazz Lake.

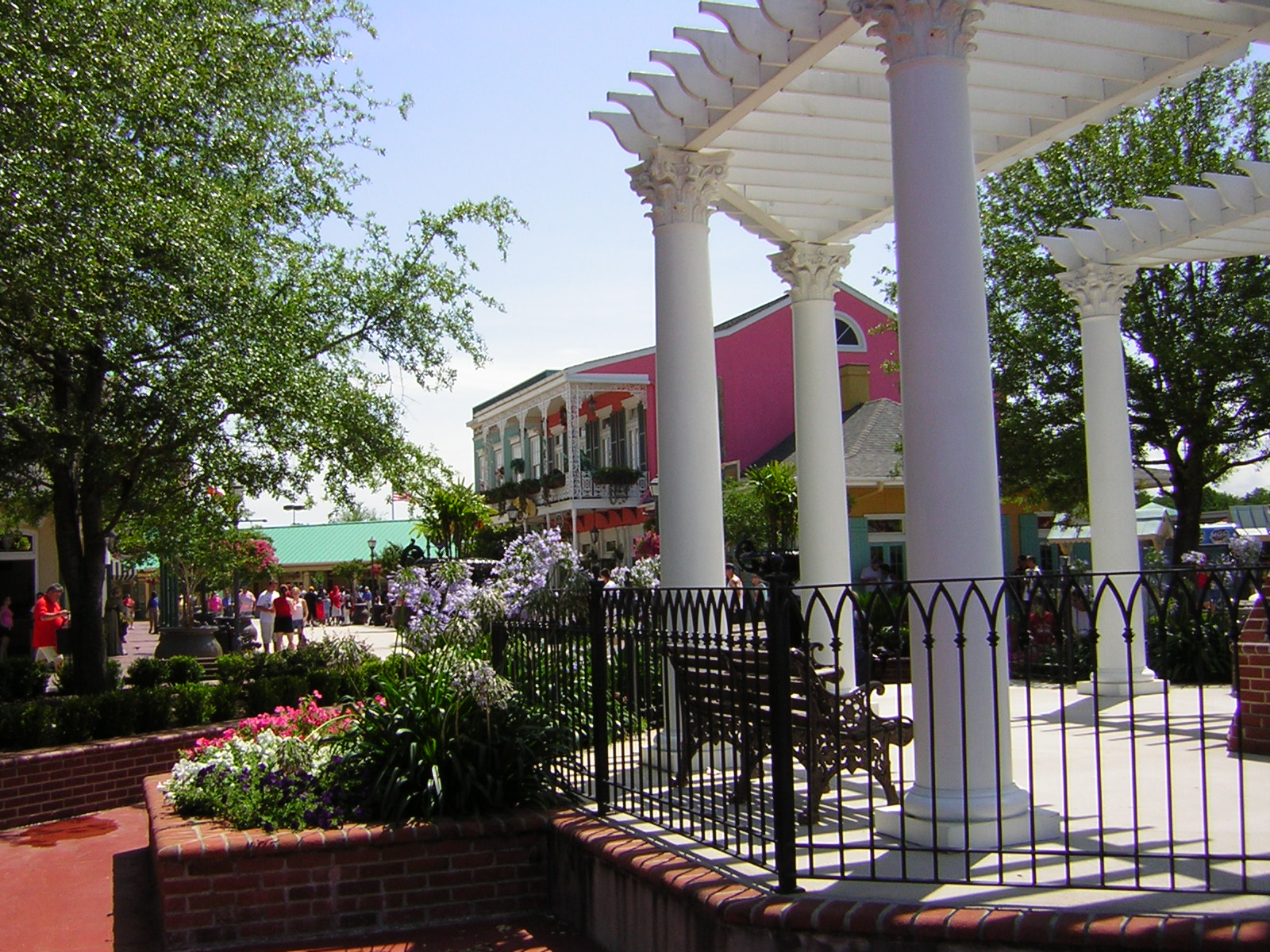
Six Flags New Orleans Main Plaza

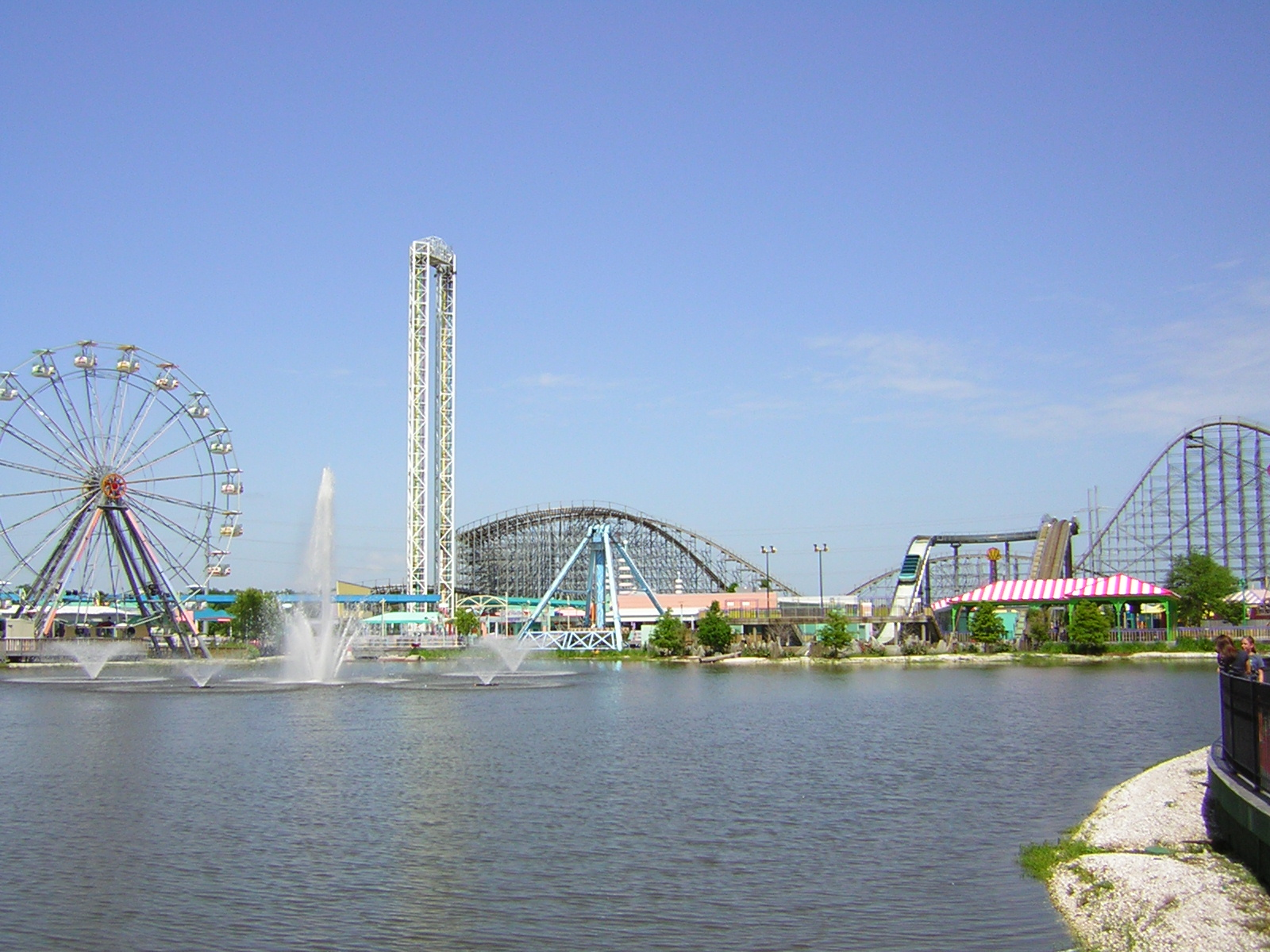
Waterfront view west from Main Street Square over Crescent City Basin; L–R: prominent rides include The Big Easy Ferris wheel, Bayou Blaster/Sonic Slam, Dizzy Lizzy, Spillway Splashout and Mega Zeph

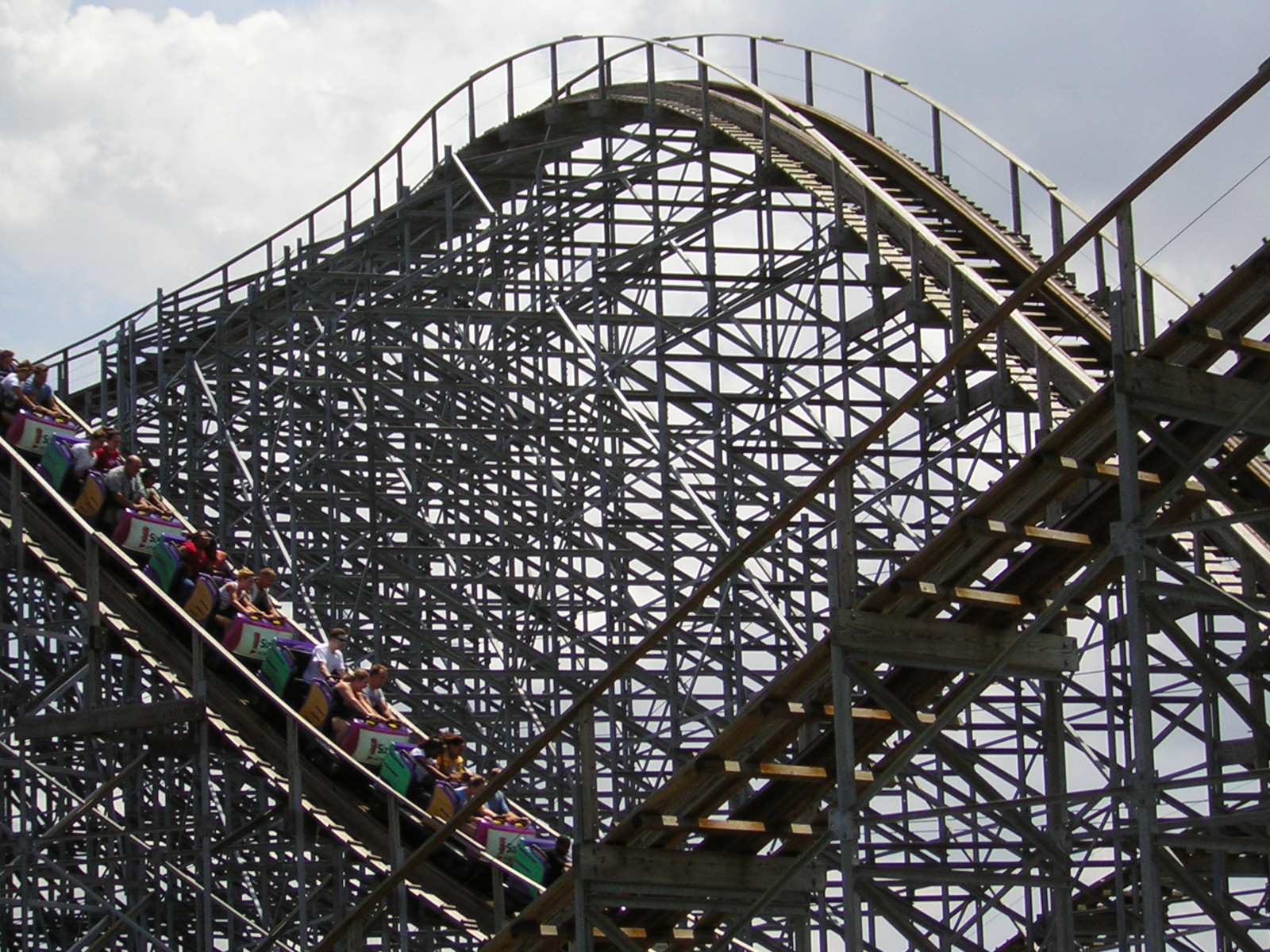
Mega Zeph

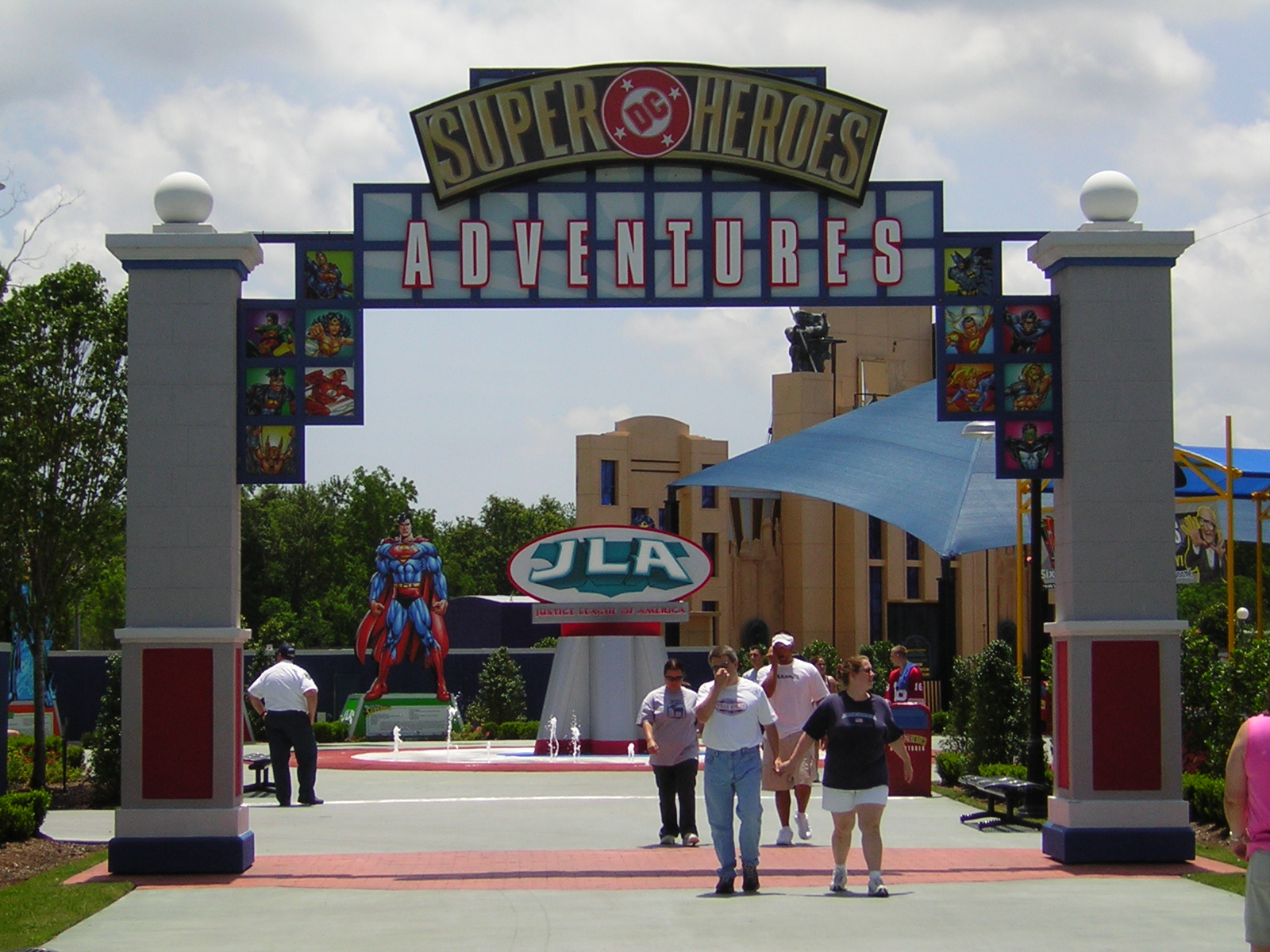
Gateway to DC Comics Super Heroes Adventures

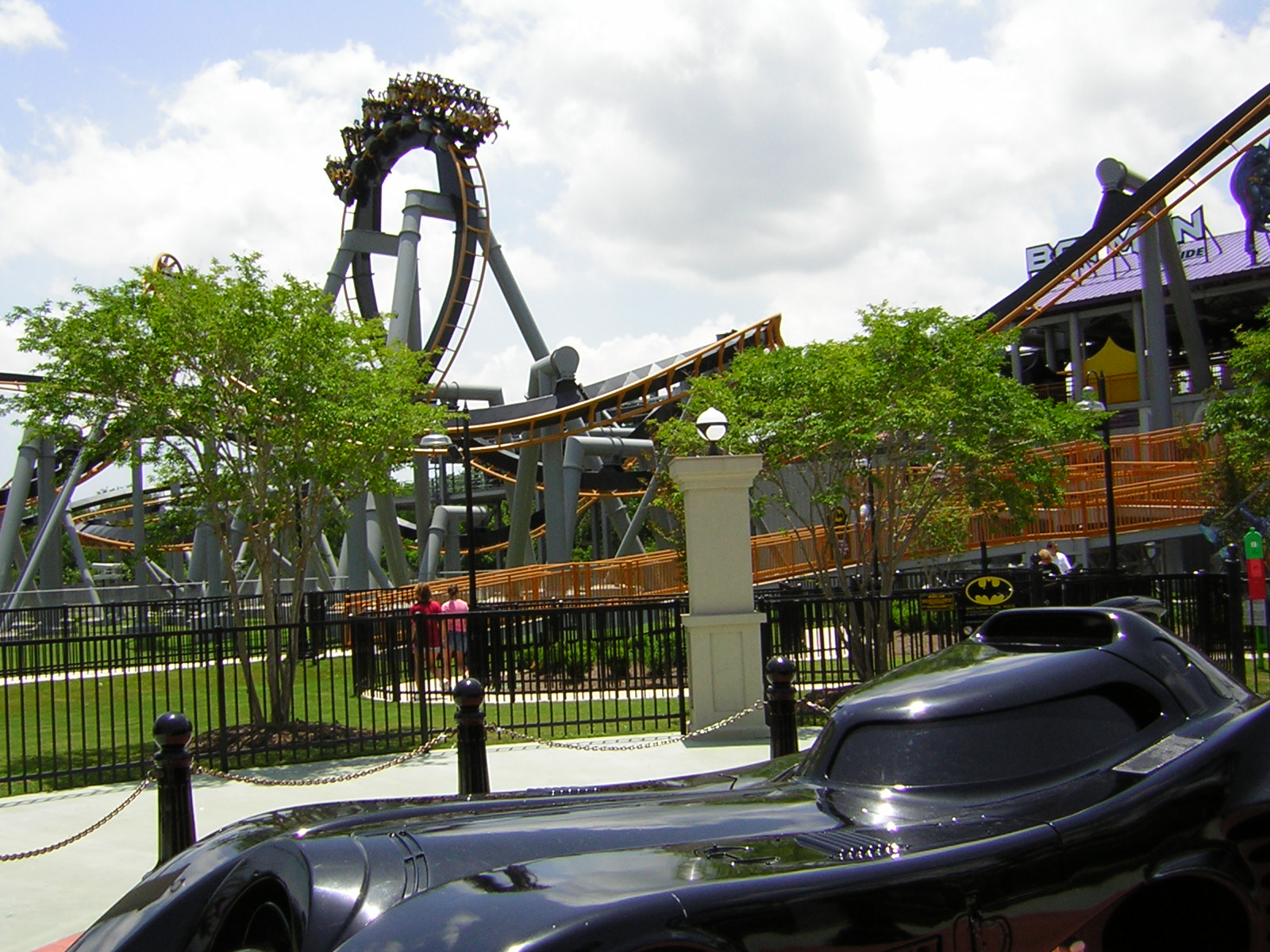
Batman: The Ride

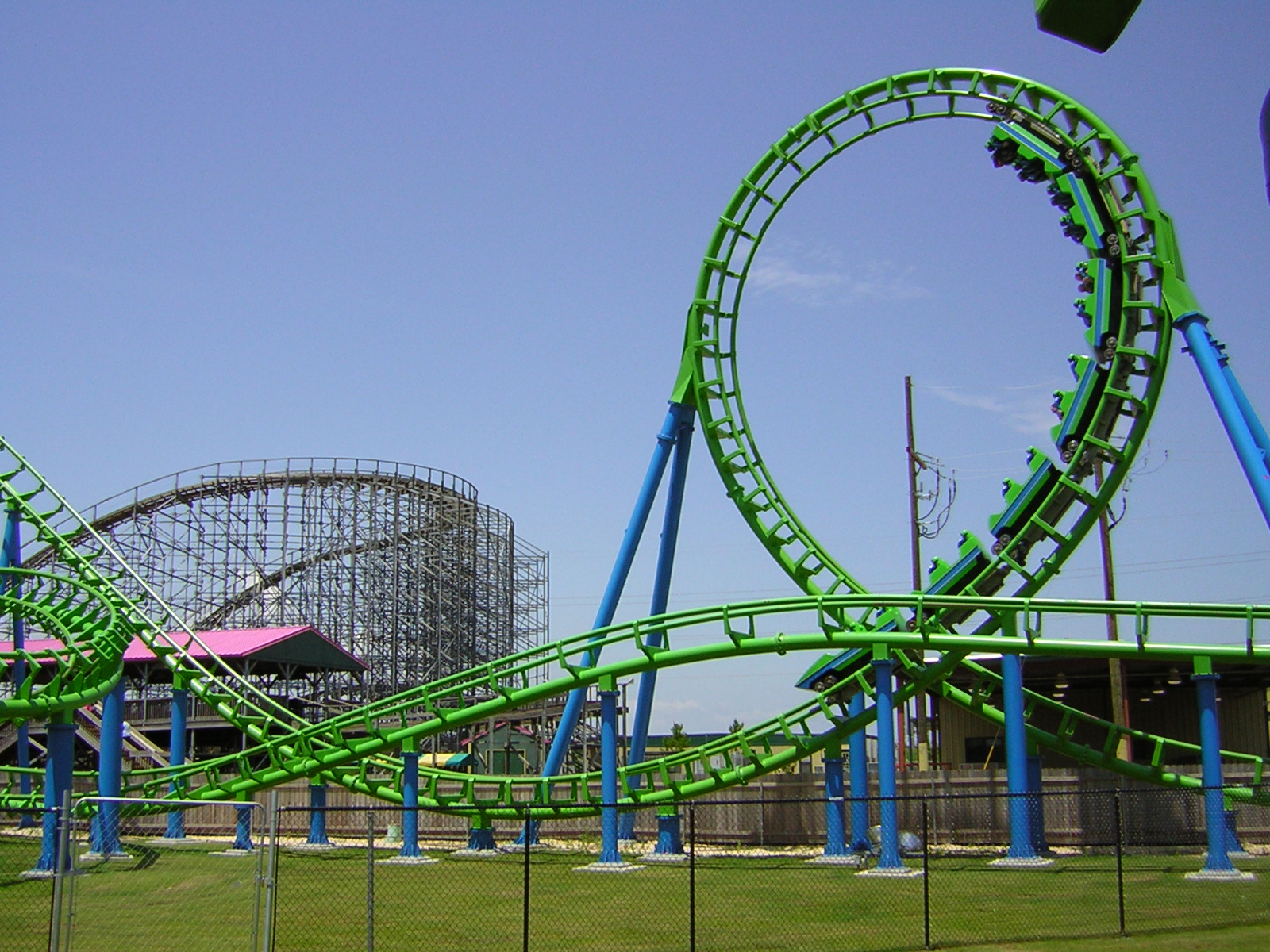
The Jester

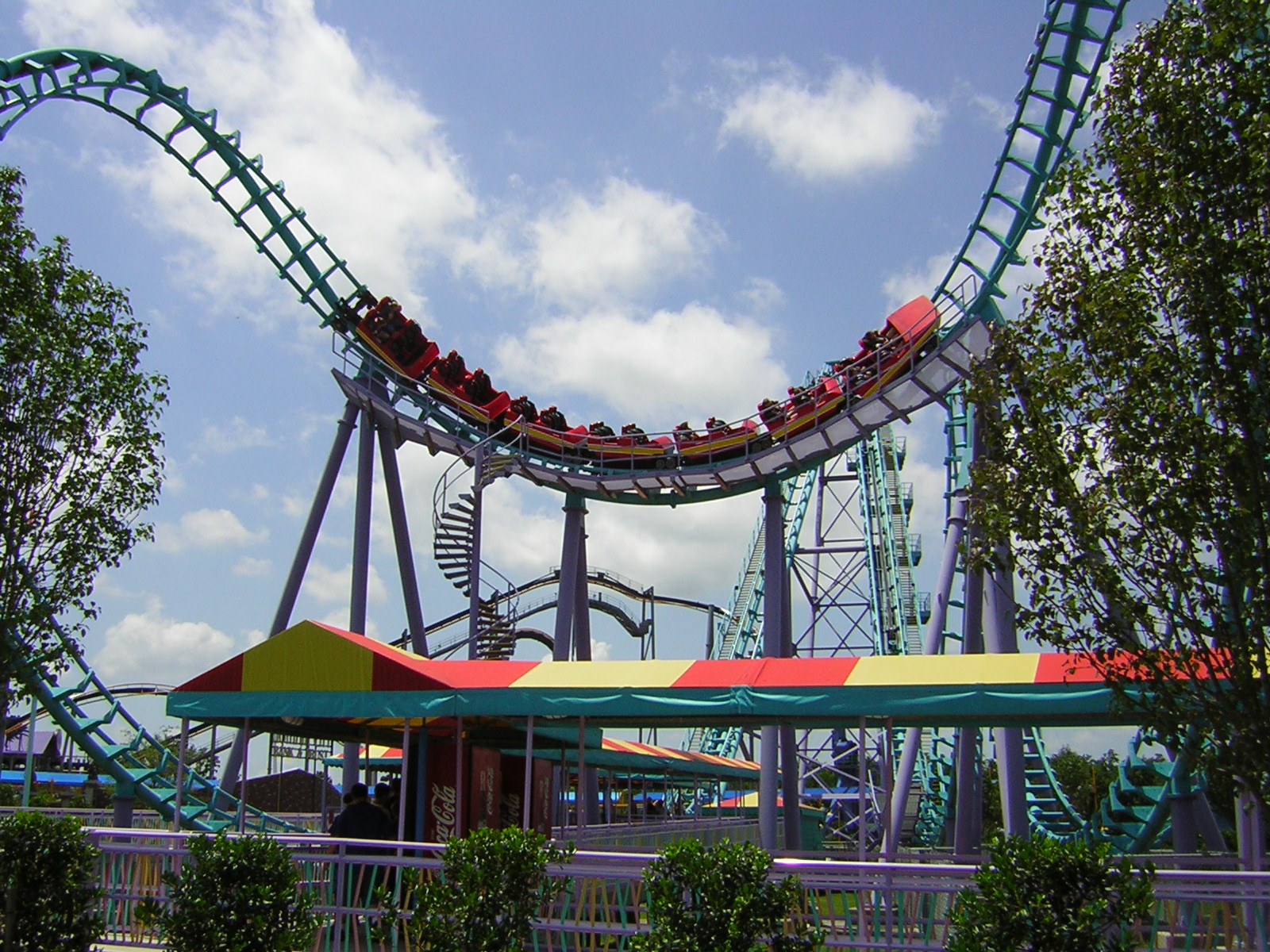
Zydeco Scream

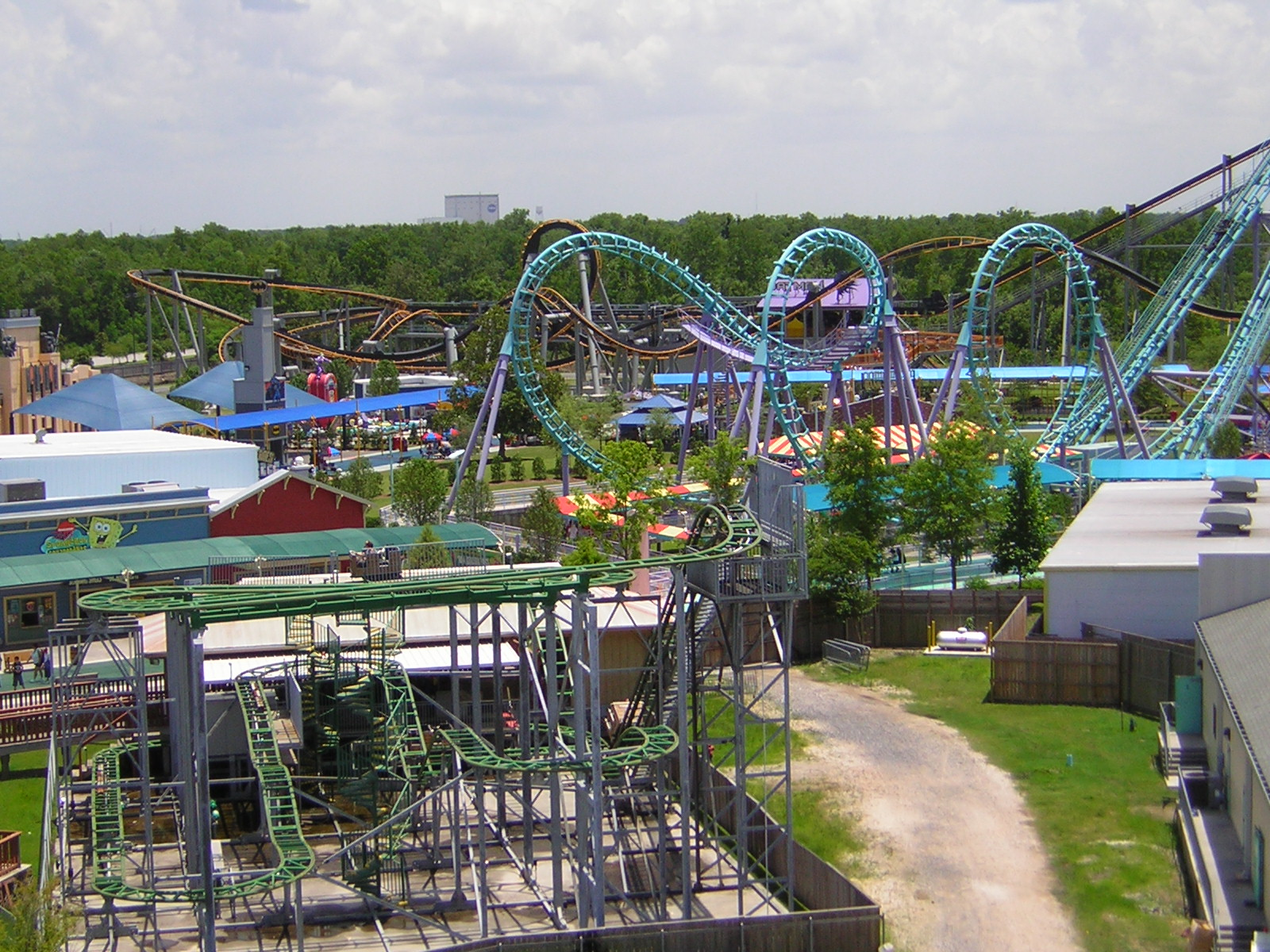
View south from The Big Easy Ferris wheel

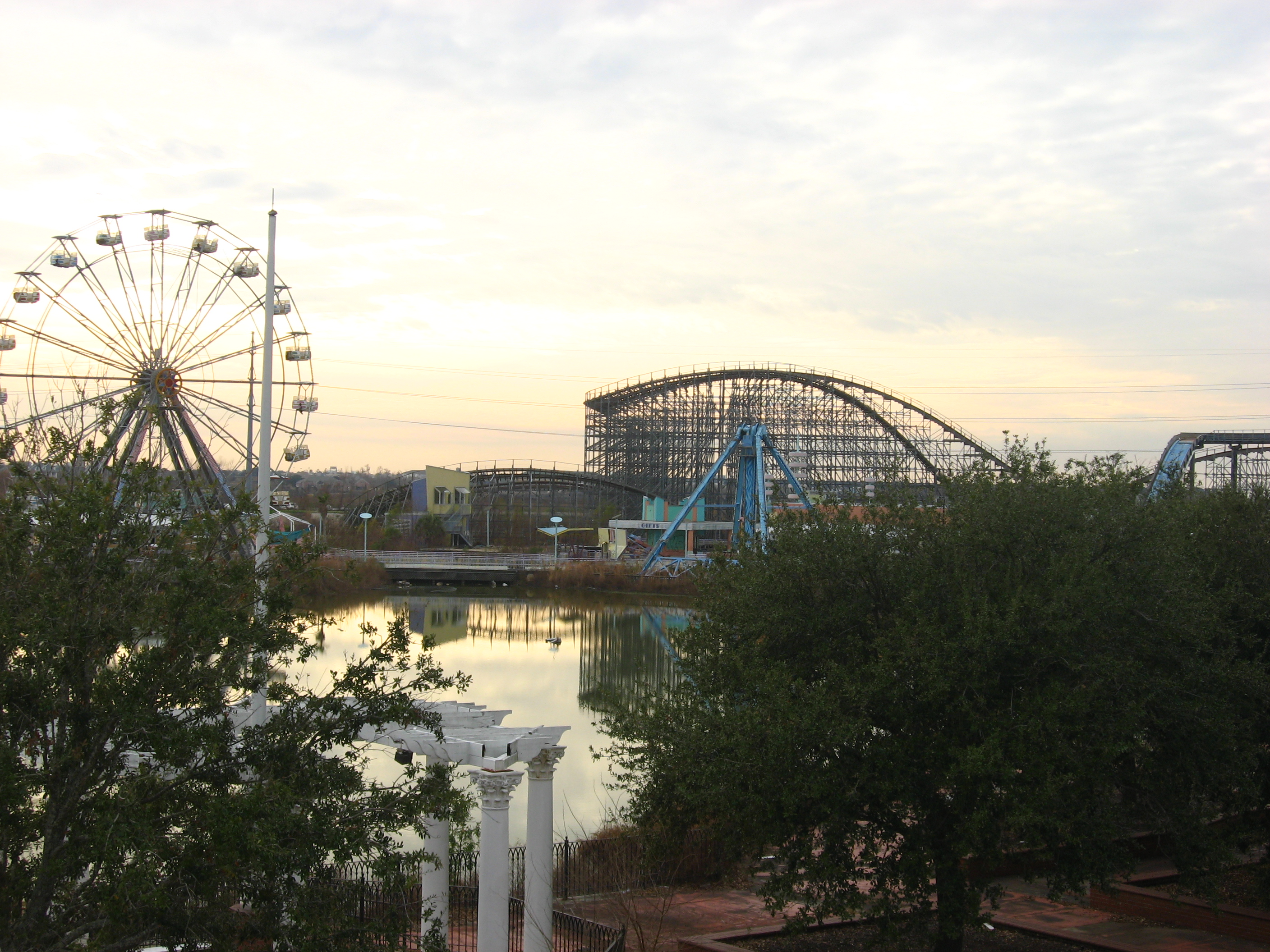
The Big Easy Ferris wheel, Dizzy Lizzy, Spillway Splashout and Mega Zeph

== Hurricane Katrina ==
Because the park was located in low-lying swampland near Lake Pontchartrain, the park installed drainage pipes to protect it from flooding. On the morning of August 29, 2005, just after sunrise, Hurricane Katrina made landfall in Southeast Louisiana, resulting in 1,464 deaths and over $100 billion in damages. As many as 26,000 city residents took shelter at the Louisiana Superdome, and over 80% of New Orleans was flooded.

Water from Lake Pontchartrain overflowed and overwhelmed the drainage system at Six Flags New Orleans, which could not keep up with the water flow, flooding the theme park for the duration of Katrina. In the storm's aftermath, the park was left submerged 6 feet (1.8 m) deep, taking over a month for the water to leave the park and leaving devastation in its wake.

== After Hurricane Katrina ==
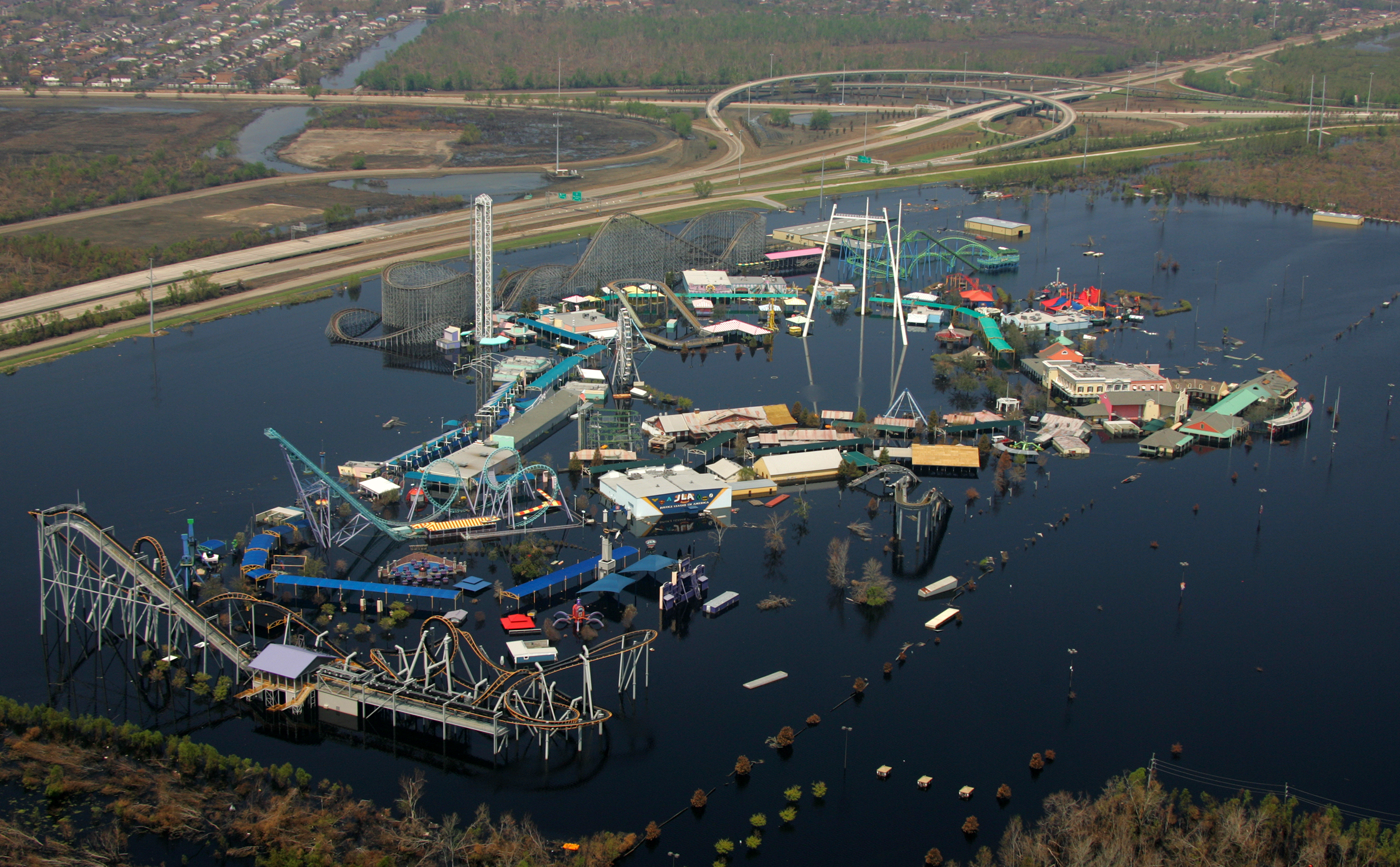
The park still flooded two weeks after Hurricane Katrina

The park grounds are located on a low-lying section of Eastern New Orleans, with a 6-foot (1.8 m) earthen flood berm running along the perimeter, creating an artificial basin. As such, this area was heavily flooded in 2005 after Hurricane Katrina. After the park's drainage pumps failed during the storm, the berm retained the combination of rainwater and seawater overflow from Lake Pontchartrain caused by Katrina's massive storm surge, submerging the entire park grounds in corrosive, brackish floodwater to a depth of 4 to 7 feet (1.2 to 2.1 m) for over a month. Due to the extensive water and wind damage sustained, the park was closed indefinitely without plans to reopen.

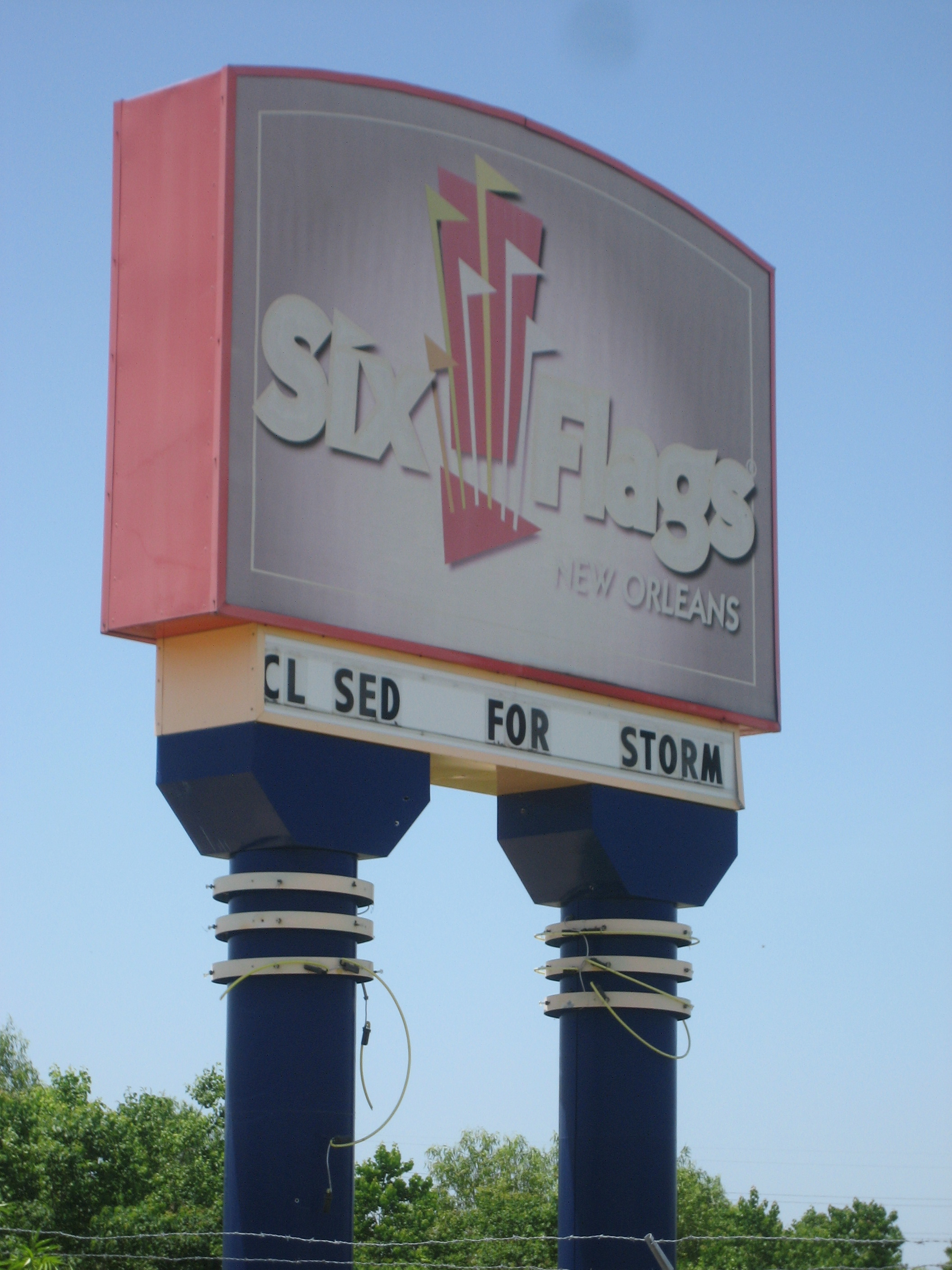
Six Flags New Orleans sign in 2010

Initial damage reports by Six Flags inspectors stated that the park buildings, the flat rides (except for one that was being serviced off-site at the time of the storm), and attractions were 80% destroyed by long-term salt-water immersion and both the wooden track and steel superstructure of the Mega Zeph were likely damaged beyond repair. The only large ride to escape relatively unscathed was the Batman: The Ride roller-coaster due to its elevated station platform and corrosion-resistant support structure.

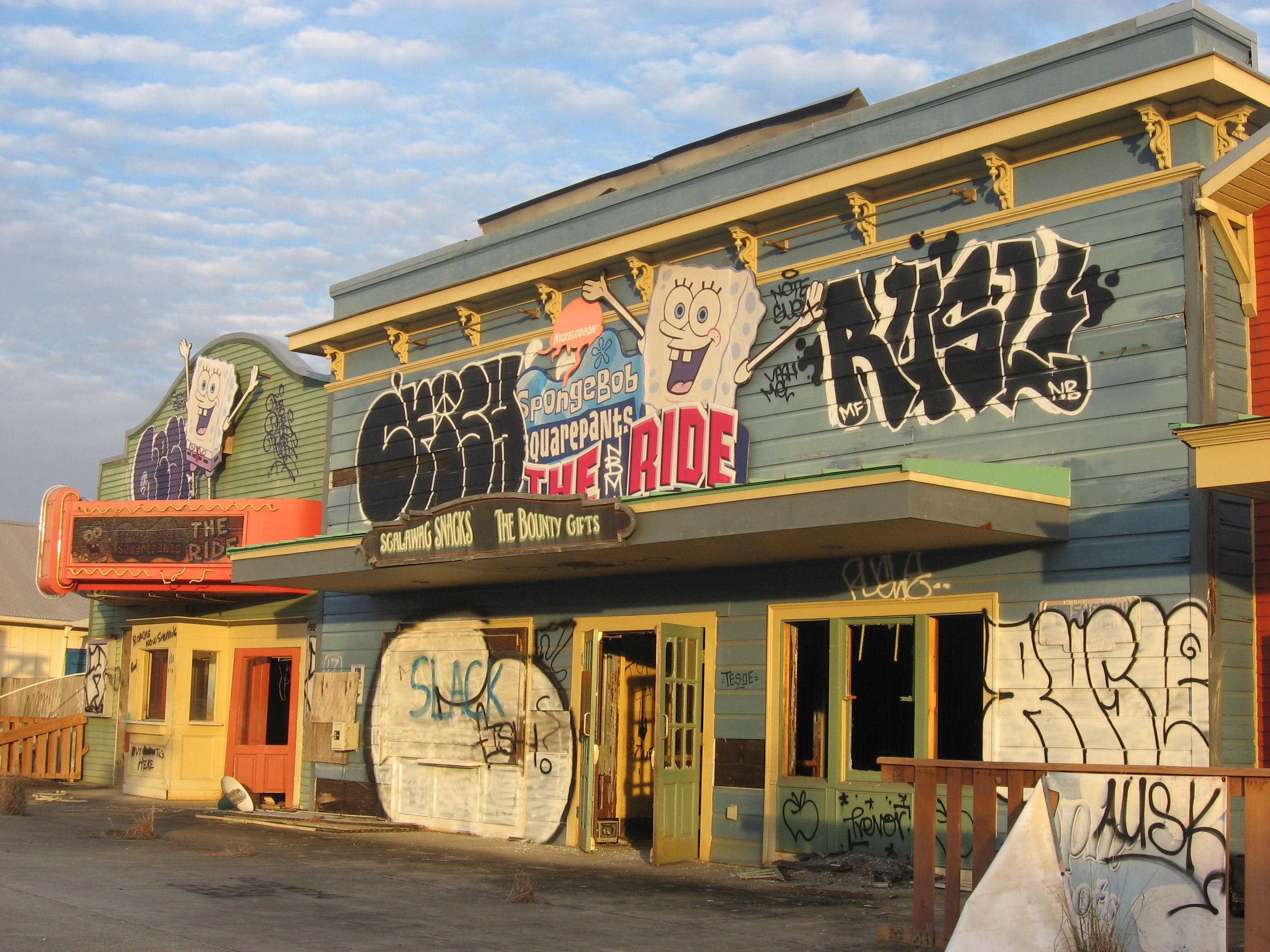
The vandalism and post-Hurricane Katrina look of SpongeBob SquarePants: The Ride in 2011

On July 1, 2006, having announced that the park would be closed "at least" through 2007, Six Flags announced that it had concluded its damage assessments and declared the park to be an "effective total loss"—with no desire or intent by the company to undertake the prohibitive cost of rebuilding—and was in negotiations with the City of New Orleans to make an early exit from the 75-year lease that Six Flags entered into on the property in 2002. However, then-Mayor Ray Nagin said he planned to hold Six Flags to the lease agreement and force them to rebuild. If held to the terms of the lease agreement, Six Flags would have been legally obligated to rebuild the park on the same site, but only to the extent of the insurance money Six Flags received. Six Flags determined the value of assets the storm destroyed was $32.5 million. As of September 2006, Six Flags had collected $11.5 million of insurance proceeds, bringing the insurance receivable balance to $24.4 million. In January 2007, Six Flags officials revealed to the New Orleans Times-Picayune that the company was suing its insurers for the remaining $17.5 million in coverage.

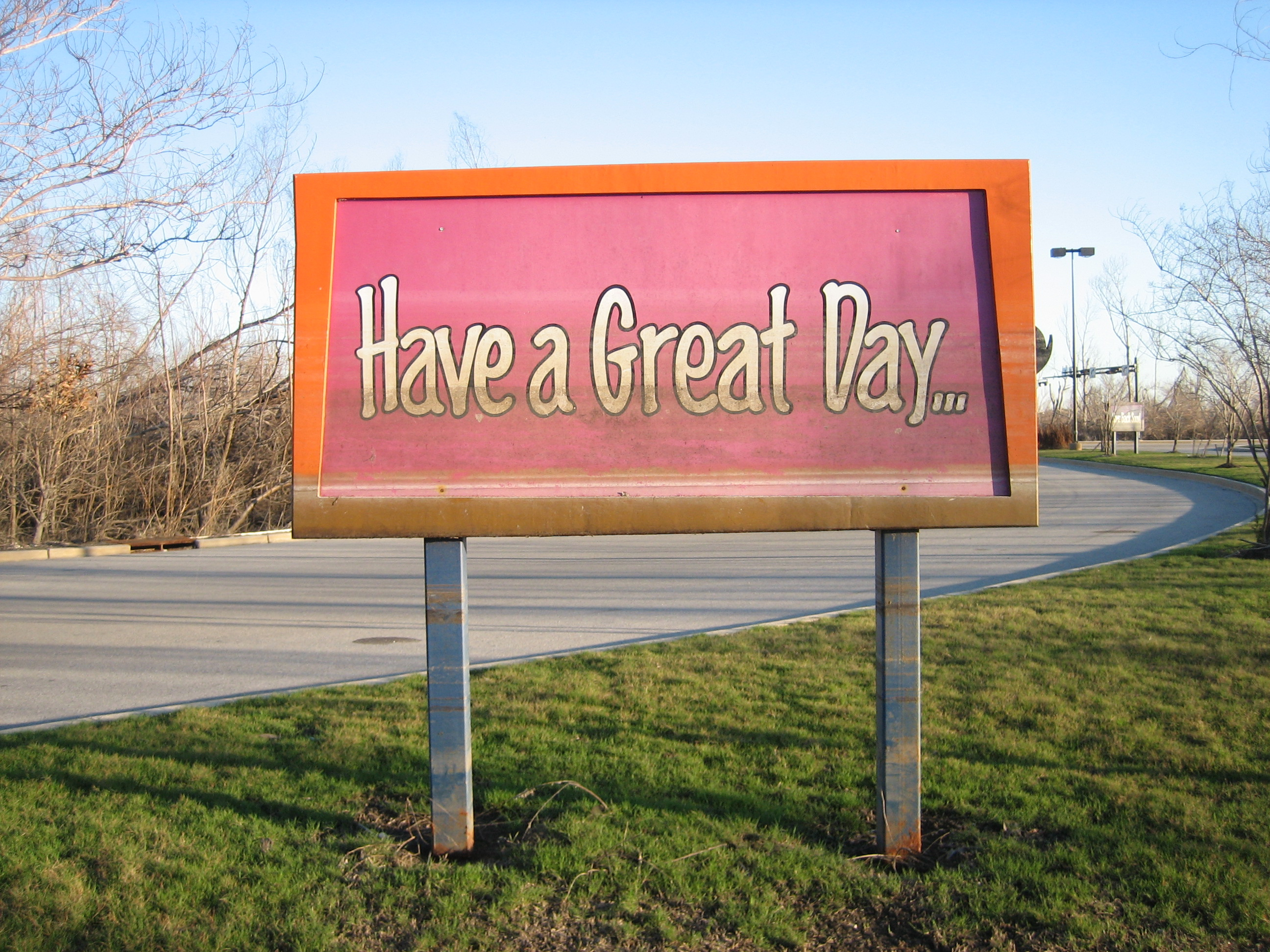
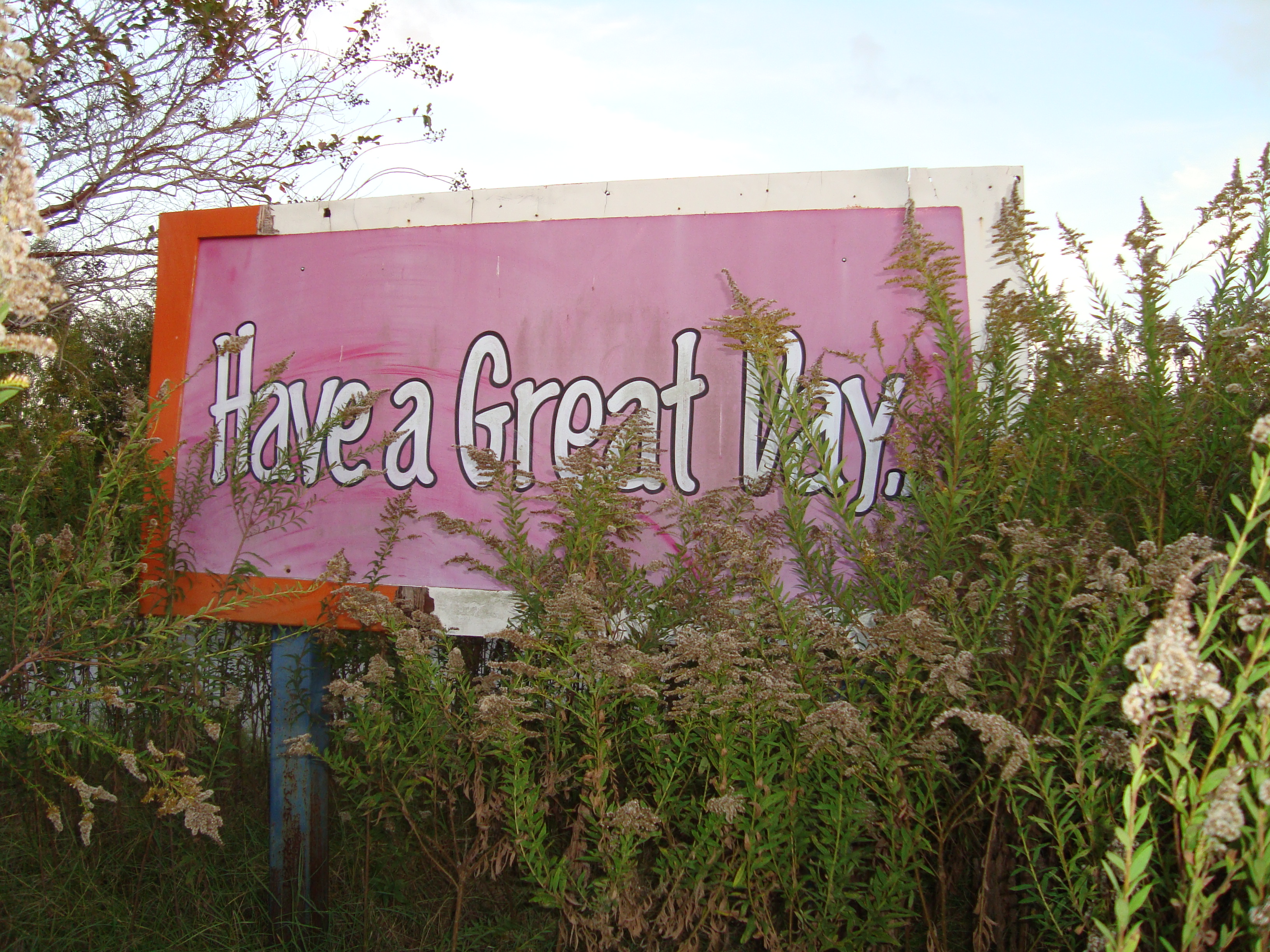
Exit sign several months after Hurricane Katrina in January 2006 and again in November 2010

The park had been one of the least profitable parks in the Six Flags portfolio. Though the park was located in New Orleans East near some of the area's more affluent neighborhoods, the park was originally budgeted to bring in tourists from the city's downtown attractions to supplement the city's relatively smaller population base (New Orleans had been experiencing a declining population before Hurricane Katrina). However, near the time that the storm struck, Six Flags had already begun closing some of its smaller, less profitable parks across the country. Hurricane Katrina cemented the New Orleans park as another part of Six Flags' portfolio which would eventually close permanently.

On December 15, 2006, Six Flags confirmed that it was removing Batman: The Ride for refurbishment and relocation to a new park, considered the only salvageable ride. Batman: The Ride was reassembled at Six Flags Fiesta Texas in San Antonio and opened under the new name Goliath on April 18, 2008. In addition to Batman: The Ride, Six Flags removed shade coverings, ride parts, lights, security cameras, planting structures, and various other salvageable items.

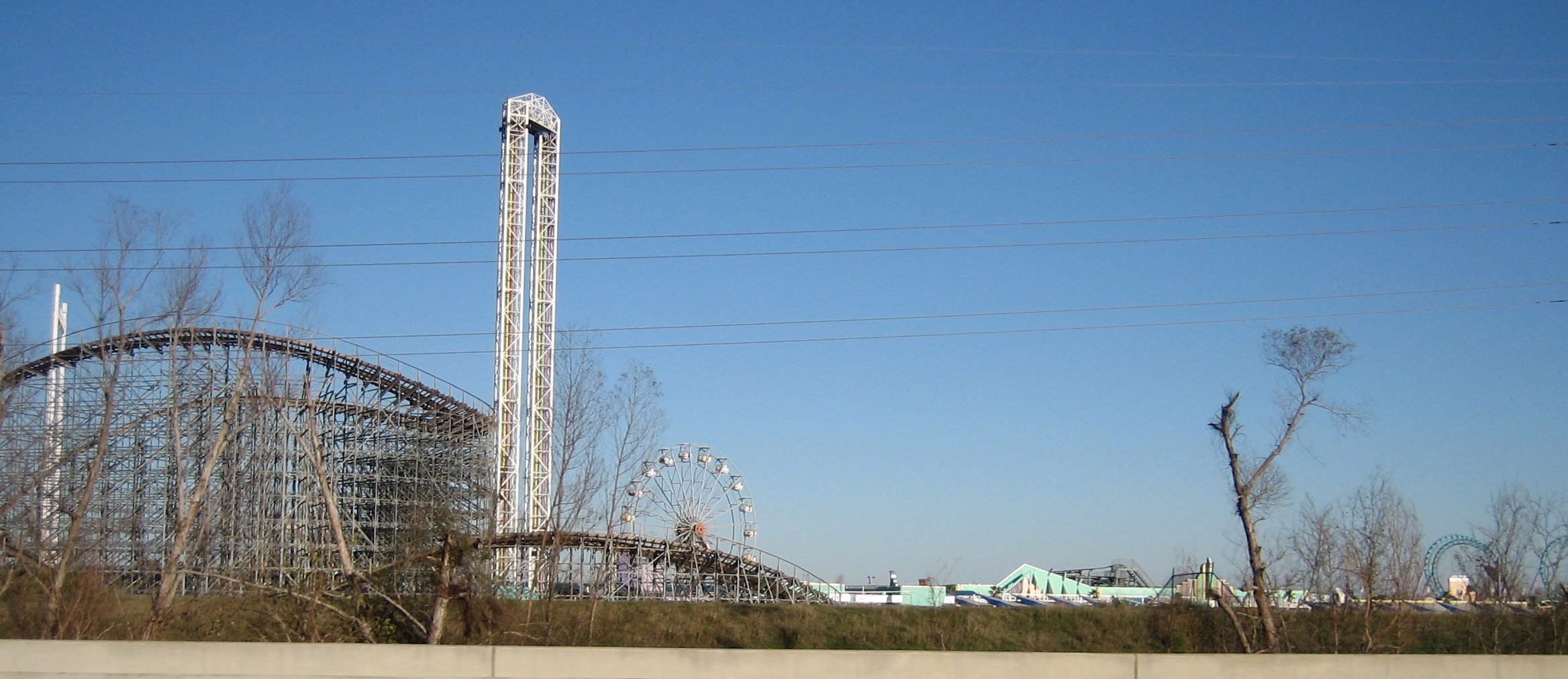
The Bayou Blaster and Sonic Slam as seen in January 2006

Besides Batman: The Ride, other rides were later removed from the park. Bayou Blaster and Sonic Slam were removed in 2008 and taken to Great Escape in Queensbury, New York, where the ride was refurbished and reopened under the name Sasquatch on May 10, 2009. Road Runner Express was removed in 2009 and taken to Larson International in Plainview, Texas, to be refurbished. It was eventually installed at Six Flags Magic Mountain in Valencia, California, where it reopened on May 28, 2011, under the same name.

As late as the fall of 2009, the Six Flags website said the company was "still in the process of settling claims with its insurers due to substantial damage caused by Hurricane Katrina," adding that the park would remain closed.

=== Use as a film shoot location ===
In 2011, Killer Joe was filmed in the park featuring the wooden coaster Mega Zeph. Stolen was also filmed at the park that year. Stolen used the Main Street Square section to double as the Quarter. Additionally, a burning car was driven into the lagoon, and the Orpheum Theatre was used as the home of the film's villain.

The Industrial Development Board (IDB) agreed to let 20th Century Fox film the 2013 film Percy Jackson: Sea of Monsters in the theme park during the summer of 2012 through August. Mega Zeph, Ozarka Splash and The Big Easy are three rides that have been shot for the film along with five other rides that the production crew had brought into the park, since all the original rides were rendered inoperable to shoot for the film. Before shooting at the park for five weeks, the production crew took two weeks to restore the derelict park to the needed condition by installing lighting and covering up graffiti on the buildings. The park portrays the fictional Circeland on the island of Polyphemus that was built by the goddess Circe, only to be destroyed by the cyclops Polyphemus.

During the summer of 2013, portions of the park were filmed for the movie Dawn of the Planet of the Apes until mid-August. The park was also used to film portions of the movie Jurassic World in June 2014.

Jurassic World used the parking lot as the location for the Jurassic World park. Deepwater Horizon built its oil rig set in the parking lot.

In January 2015, the park was photographed as part of a photo essay/series by Cleveland-based photographer Johnny Joo. In this series, Joo documented the abandoned or historic structures of New Orleans, which remained ten years after Hurricane Katrina. He also documented portions of revitalization in the community of New Orleans to show how the area has been rebuilt after one of the most significant natural disasters in United States history.

In 2016, the video game Mafia III is set in a fictional version of New Orleans. The abandoned amusement park in that game features a partially flooded site, a similar entranceway, and a roller-coaster that strongly resembles the Mega Zeph.

In 2019, rapper NF used parts of the park for his music video for "Leave Me Alone." Also, in 2019, parts of the park were used in the movie Synchronic starring Anthony Mackie.

In 2019, the park was the subject of the Bright Sun Films documentary titled Closed for Storm. The documentary features visuals of the park in its current state and interviews with past employees, fans, and developers interested in rebuilding the property. It received a wide release in July 2021.

The park was used as a movie location for the 2021 movie Reminiscence.

== Redevelopment proposals ==
=== Southern Star Amusement (2008–2011) ===
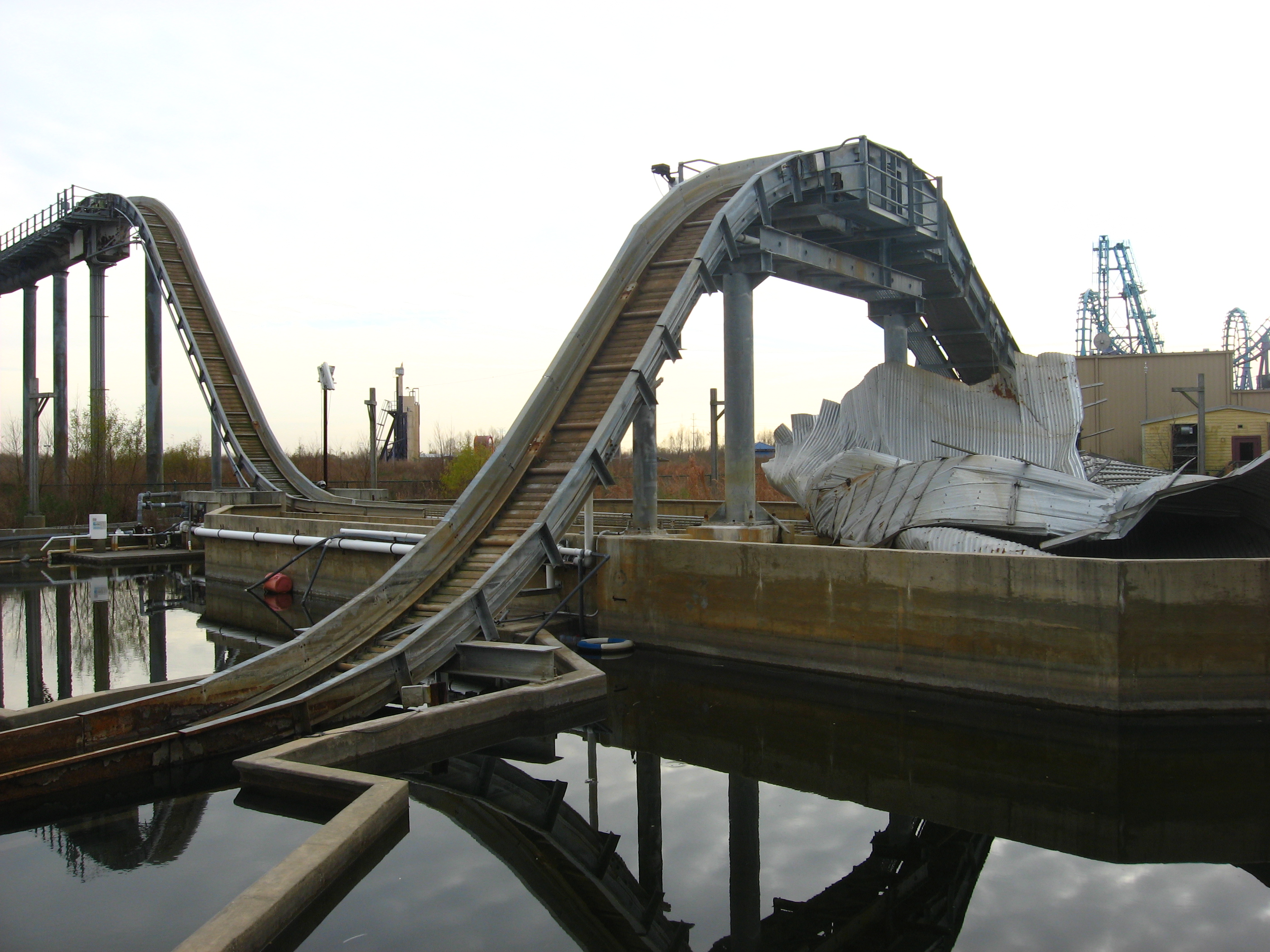
Debris still on Ozarka Splash in 2011

In April 2008, Southern Star Amusement Inc. proposed to take over the site lease from the then-owner Six Flags, promising to expand the park to over 60 rides (more than double its pre-Katrina size), complete a water park that Six Flags had been planning, and add an RV park. Southern Star Amusement Inc. pledged to open the park as Legend City Adventure Park, with 60 rides in place, including a new water park by the summer of 2009 if the city approved the lease takeover, with the campground to follow. One issue concerning rebuilding was Six Flags' continued removal of infrastructure from the park. In a quarterly conference call, Six Flags discussed plans to remove the S&S Towers by 2009, with more ride removals to follow. Items from existing Jazzland rides, such as Mega Zeph's trains and Spillway Splashout's boats, were sent to other parks. On September 27, 2008, Southern Star stated on its website that it would no longer be trying to revive Six Flags New Orleans.

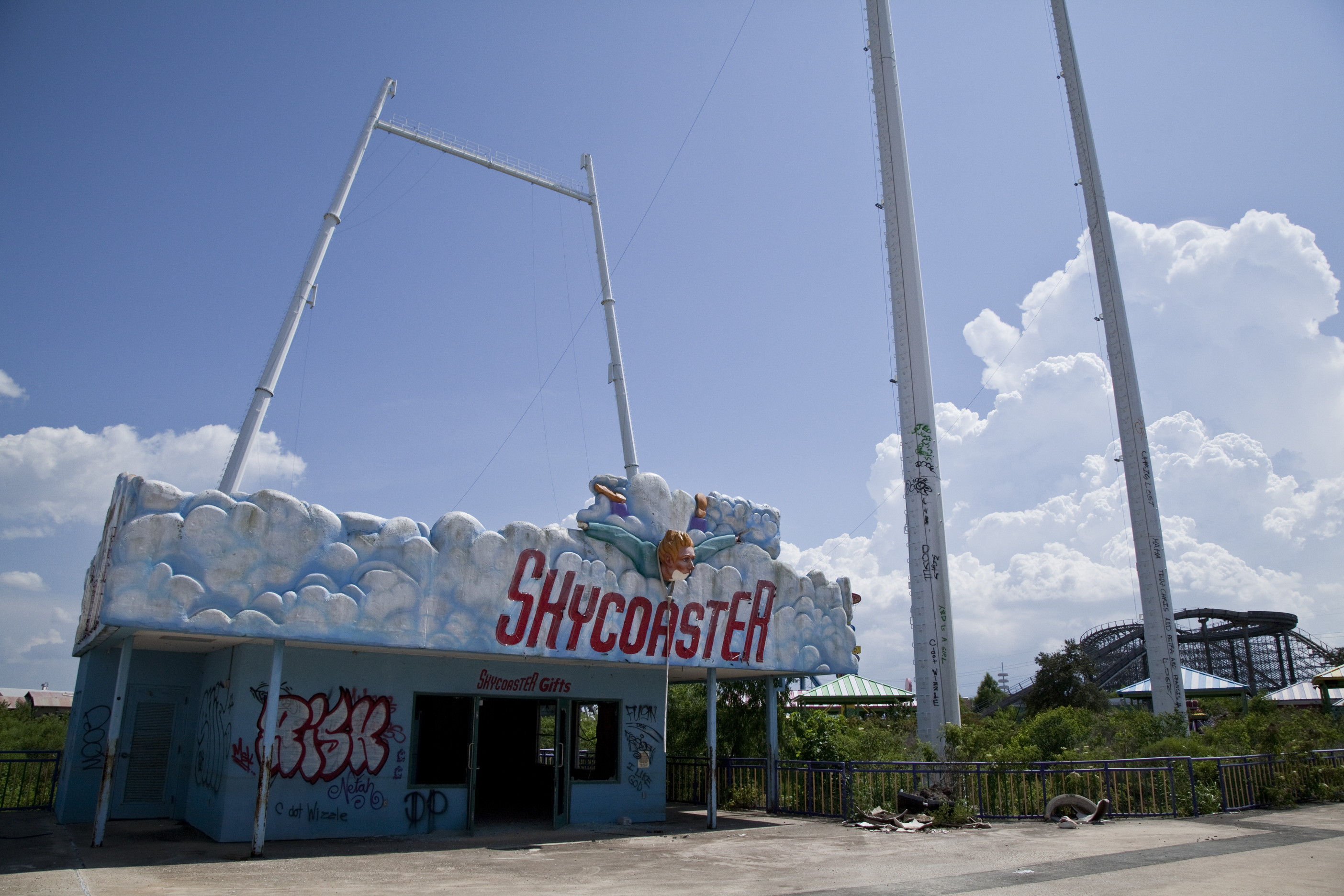
SkyCoaster ride in 2011

In February 2009, Southern Star was taking another look at the park and considering a takeover bid with the City of New Orleans. Southern Star planned a scaled-down effort with intentions only to reopen the park with a water park added to the existing midway area. The idea was to reopen and build incrementally, saving about $50 million in improvements for the next few years. Given the poor economic situation then, this plan seemed to be the only way to save the park. The basic idea was to use investors and Go Zone Bonds to raise the $35 to $40 million needed to reopen the park with basic improvements required to make a real recovery and profit. Southern Star's CEO Danny R. Rogers asked Six Flags to stop all removal action of equipment from the park, as the equipment in question belongs to the City of New Orleans and not Six Flags. Southern Star also requested the return of other equipment taken from the park.

On August 18, 2009, it was announced that the land would be redeveloped into a Nickelodeon Universe theme/water park.

On September 18, 2009, New Orleans fined Six Flags $3 million and ordered the company to vacate its lease with the park. On June 13, 2009, Six Flags filed for Chapter 11 bankruptcy protection. The City of New Orleans took ownership of the park shortly after.

As of early 2010, the site was overgrown with debris and weeds. Removal of the debris and underbrush had begun.

As of April 11, 2010, the site was still shut down with no clear future since the city of New Orleans owned the property by this time, and the plans for the Nickelodeon-branded theme park fell through three months after bonds failed to come through.

On January 21, 2011, Southern Star went public with its third redevelopment plans for the park, posting a link on their company website. On January 26, 2011, Southern Star posted a Letter of Intent for the park on its website. The redevelopment plans gave a brief history of the property, pre and post-Katrina condition photos, development concept photos, written descriptions of each phase of the redevelopment procedure, and business projections for when it opens. During "Phase I", Southern Star planned to restore what is left of the park and expand it by adding more rides and reverting the park to its original Louisiana theme. The park would be revamped to reflect Louisiana's history and heritage, with one of the proposed sections paying tribute to the now-defunct Pontchartrain Beach, which closed in 1983.

"Phase II" entailed adding a water park, and future expansion phases included adding a youth sports complex, an on-site hotel/resort, and a movie studio/backlot that would cater to the needs of various production companies filming in the New Orleans area. Plans also included developing an entertainment and shopping district within the park. These plans entailed utilizing all 224 acres (91 ha) of the site of which only 100 acres (40 ha) were to be developed and occupied by the remains of the Six Flags New Orleans park.

The Letter of Intent from Southern Star set out a lease agreement between the city and the company, stating Southern Star's proposed lease terms and its intent to utilize and restore the area. The company would enter a 75-year lease and take on the property in its current condition. Southern Star planned to take possession of the property before the lease was established to provide preliminary security and repair/cleanup services. The lease would not have taken effect until Southern Star had taken possession of the property, started the cleanup process, and provided proof of funding to the city. After that, the city had 15 days to execute its end of the agreement. Any improvements made would belong to the company, and the lease would end in 2018. The plans never came to fruition, however.

=== Jazzland Outlet Mall (2011–2014) ===
Entrance to the proposed Jazzland Outlet Mall

In August 2011, the City of New Orleans called for proposals for redevelopment ideas for the site. Eight entrepreneurs stepped forward to suggest turning the property into a power plant, a theme park, or even an outlet mall. On November 29, 2011, New Orleans chose two proposed projects: an outlet mall and a green theme park. On February 6, 2012, it was reported that the selection committee rejected the plan for the site of Six Flags New Orleans to become a theme park, leaving the upscale outlet mall as the only proposal being considered by the committee. Despite the committee's actions, one of the original eight entrepreneurs continued to try to get public support for their Jazzland Park proposal, which includes the addition of a water park and movie studio back lot.

On March 6, 2012, New Orleans gave the green light to build Jazzland Outlet Mall to Provident Realty Advisors and DAG Development. The proposal was for a 400,000 square feet (37,000 m^{2}) upscale outlet mall and entertainment boardwalk on the former theme park site, costing $40 million for part of Phase One and using some of the existing rides from the theme park. Construction would have taken between three and four years. During the planned period of due diligence and pre-construction, in March 2013, the development plans were abruptly called off. The developer cited competition from the planned expansion of Riverwalk Marketplace to include an outlet mall, making the Jazzland Outlet Mall concept unviable. However, as of the summer of 2013, Provident Realty Advisors and DAG Development has been back at the negotiating table with the city to come up with a new idea for the park; they will have to present a development plan to the Industrial Development Board (IDB) in October 2013, according to a contract. IDB will accept or reject the proposal once presented. The agreement also states that construction of an outlet mall is to proceed, but it does not explicitly prohibit allowing the developers to put something else there.

=== Dreamlanding Festival Park (2016–2018) ===
In 2016, a group that included the former head of Southern Star came together to form "Dreamlanding Festival Park" to buy and rebuild this park, pending city council/mayoral approval. According to their website, the group was ready to spend over $100 million to reopen the park, with construction scheduled to begin in the summer of 2018, a stated opening date of 2019, and more coasters ready for 2020. At the same time, a waterpark would open in spring 2019. A festival park and an RV site were also in their plans as they awaited the city's approval to purchase the park.

In 2018, the Dreamlanding Festival Park website released the following statement: "It is very hard to walk away from all the time and efforts we have put into New Orleans but in truth the old Jazzland/Six Flags park has now reached a point of no return. On our last inspection and after further review we find that the rides that were savable as well as the majority of buildings are no longer economically viable to salvage."

=== Jazzland Paidia Company (2011–2021) ===
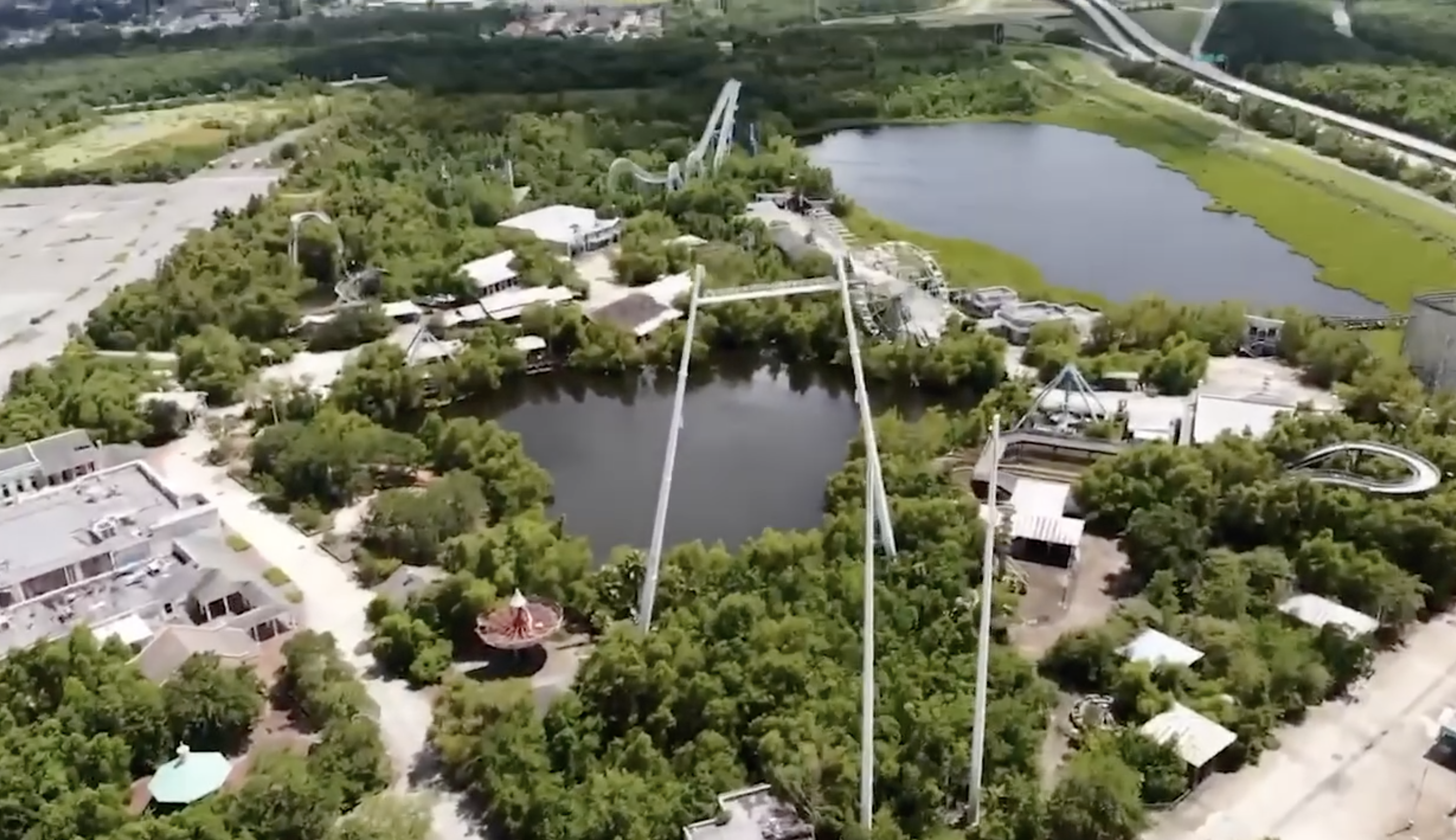
Six Flags New Orleans seen from a drone. Taken in July 2020

In 2011, eight groups, including the Paidia Company, responded to an RFP issued by the Mayor's office. Paidia proposed reopening the park as Jazzland, the park's name until 2002. The company was not selected during the first RFP. A second RFP was issued in January 2014. Jazzland submitted the only proposal. The plans include newly designed themes for the park, a new Baritone Beach water park, Sportsman's Paradise Resort Hotel and a mixed-use retail/dining/entertainment area. A few rides would be rebuilt, but most would be new. A "Sportsman's Paradise" section would include the existing Jester coaster, and the "Beach" would include Megazeph. Ozarka Splash would be rebuilt as a "sugar flume", using the state's sugar cane industry for its theme. In February 2017, the company submitted a purchase offer for the property. In May 2017, the IDB voted to turn over decision-making power to the Mayor's office. In June 2018, the IDB renewed the cooperative agreement with the new mayor, keeping the decision power in the mayor's office.

=== Bayou Phoenix (2021–present) ===
In October 2021, New Orleans Mayor LaToya Cantrell announced Bayou Phoenix as the partner chosen to redevelop the site. On November 10, 2022, the redevelopment plans were announced to be "on life support" and "could be dead soon", as no lease agreement has been reached. On March 7, 2023, an agreement was finally reached to redevelop the park. On August 15, 2023, the New Orleans Redevelopment Authority approved the Bayou Phoenix development proposal to move to the next phase. A September 2023 article by Axios reported the park redevelopment will move forward. In October 2023, the lease was signed. In August 2024, it was announced that beginning in September, Six Flags New Orleans will be demolished after 19 years, and construction on the new development will begin shortly after. Demolition started in November 2024 by Smoot Construction but was later put on halt due to contractor license issues. The demolition of the park subsequently resumed with a new contractor in December 2024, and the site was cleared of most of the remaining park structures by March 2026.

== Rides and attractions ==
These rides and attractions are still standing
Name	Area	Mfr	Type	Notes
Zydeco Zinger	Main Street Square	Fabbri	Wave Swinger	All the swings have been yanked or cut off by scrappers, and panels slowly have fallen off or have been stolen, though it continues to stand.
Lafitte's Pirate Ship	Cajun Country	Fabbri	Pirate Ship	
The Big Easy	Pontchartrain Beach	Fabbri Group	Ferris Wheel	One gondola was removed and taken by artist E.J. Hill who got permission from the city of New Orleans. The gondola was taken to Joe W. Brown Memorial Park in New Orleans East and built onto a Ferris wheel like sculpture serving as a memorial to the park. The sign was salvaged and restored by the National Roller Coaster Museum and Archives. The structure is the only one remaining from Ponchartrain Beach as of January 2025, it will be restored as the Kai L'Ani Ross Memorial Ferris Wheel.
Pepe Le Pew & The Swings de Paris	Looney Tunes Adventures	Zamperla	Children's swing ride	Formerly known as Zinger Swinger, it was stripped down to the tower in the center and has been left to rot, it may be restored, though it is unknown.

=== Former rides ===
Removed/retired rides and attractions
Name	Area	Opened	Closed	Mfr.	Type	Notes
Pirates 4-D	Cajun Country	2000	2003			The simulator's theater had rebranded and stopped playing the film. It was switched out to SpongeBob SquarePants: The Ride.
SpongeBob SquarePants The Ride	Cajun Country	2004	2005	SimEx-Iwerks	Motion simulator	Flooded and destroyed by Hurricane Katrina, gutted soon after in 2008.
Batman: The Ride	DC Comics Super Heroes Adventures	2003	2005	Bolliger & Mabillard	Inverted Coaster	Dismantled in 2007 and relocated to Six Flags Fiesta Texas and operating as Chupacabra. For many years, the coasters footers and former entranceway remained in the park, though it continues to stand.
Catwoman's Whip	DC Comics Super Heroes Adventures	2003	2005	Mondial	Shake	Demolished in 2024. The Catwoman statue was salvaged and sent to Six Flags New England to be used for their family roller coaster of the same name.
Joker's Jukebox	DC Comics Super Heroes Adventures	2003	2005	Wieland Schwarzkopf	Polyp	Demolished in 2024. The Joker statue that once stood on top of the Jukebox was rescued and salvaged by the National Roller Coaster Museum and Archives and is on display there.
Lex Luthor's Invertatron	DC Comics Super Heroes Adventures	2003	2005	Moser's Rides	Super Loop On Top	Demolished in 2024.
Jocco's Mardi Gras Madness	Mardi Gras	2000	2005	Sally Corporation	Interactive dark ride	Was gutted post-Katrina with everything except a few ride vehicles remaining. Building was demolished in January 2025.
Mad Rex	Mardi Gras	2000	2005	Chance Morgan	Wipeout	Demolished in February 2025.
Tweety's Tweehouse	Looney Tunes Adventures	2000	2005	Zamperla	Jumpin' Star	Formerly known as Frog Hopper. Demolished in January 2025.
Yosemite Sam and the Wild West Wheel	Looney Tunes Adventures	2000	2005	Zamperla	Ferris Wheel	Formerly known as The Little Easy. All the cars were stripped off the structure post Katrina. Demolished in January 2025. A ride gondola is now in the National Roller Coaster Museum and Archives. The ride was themed to the 2003 film Looney Tunes: Back in Action.
Daffy Duck and the Backlot Tour Bus	Looney Tunes Adventures	2000	2005	Zamperla	Crazy Bus	Formerly known as Jolly Jitney, demolished in February 2025.
Tazmanian Devil Rumble in the Jungle	Looney Tunes Adventures	2000	2005	Zamperla	Convoy	Formerly known as Cajun Crawler, demolished in February 2025. The ride was themed to the 2003 film Looney Tunes: Back in Action.
Bugs Bunny Barnstormers	Looney Tunes Adventures	2000	2005	Zamperla	Airplane ride	Formerly known as Beadsville Airport, demolished in February 2025.
Muskrat Scrambler	Cajun Country	2000	2005	L&T Systems	Wild Mouse	Demolished in 2024.
Ozarka Splash	Cajun Country	2000	2005	Hopkins Rides	Log flume	Formerly known as Cypress Plunge. Demolished as of 2025.
Pontchartrain Flyers	Pontchartrain Beach	2000	2005	Chance Morgan	Aviator	Removed for spare parts. Carts left in the boneyard post-Katrina. Sign was salvaged and saved by the National Roller Coaster Museum and Archives, demolished in 2025.
Zydeco Scream	Pontchartrain Beach	2000	2005	Vekoma	Boomerang	Partially demolished in early November 2024, before demolition was halted. Remainder of ride fully demolished in December 2024.
Road Runner Express	Looney Tunes Adventures	2000	2005	Vekoma	Junior Coaster 207M	Formerly known as Rex's Rail Runner; removed by Six Flags in 2009 and was moved to Larson International in Plainview, Texas, where it was refurbished. It was installed at Six Flags Magic Mountain in California, opening on May 28, 2011, as Road Runner Express. The Road Runner statue was rescued and salvaged by the National Roller Coaster Museum and Archives and is on display there.
Bayou Blaster and Sonic Slam	Mardi Gras	2000	2005	S&S Worldwide	Space Shot and Turbo Drop	Bayou Blaster started at the bottom and shot riders to the top, while the Sonic Slam lifted riders to the top slowly, then dropped riders free-fall style to the bottom. The ride was removed in 2008 and taken to Six Flags Great Escape and Hurricane Harbor in Queensbury, New York, where it was refurbished and installed as Sasquatch. The ride reopened on May 10, 2009.
The Jester	Mardi Gras	2003	2005	Vekoma	Hurricane	Demolished in 2024. Signage preserved.
Krazy Krewe	Mardi Gras	2000	2005	Fabbri	Cataclysm	Demolished in 2025.
Gator Bait	Cajun Country	2000	2005	Huss	Airboat	Demolished in 2024.
Spillway Splashout	Mardi Gras	2000	2005	Hopkins Rides	Shoot the Chutes	Carts taken out and put in the boneyard post-Katrina. Demolished in 2025.
Dizzy Lizzy	Pontchartrain Beach	2000	2005	Fabbri	Boomerang	Demolished in 2025.
Beach Bang-Up	Pontchartrain Beach	2000	2005	Reverchon	Bumper Cars	Cars were taken out during demolition to be preserved, ride building demolished in 2025.
King Chaos	Mardi Gras	2000	2005	Chance Morgan	Chaos	Removed earlier in 2005 and seen in the boneyard. Some of the ride cars remained scattered around the park prior to park demolition. The ride sign was also found during demolition.
Voodoo Volcano	Mardi Gras	2000	2005	Chance Morgan	Inverter	Removed earlier in 2005 and seen in the boneyard. Station remained standing until 2025 when it was finally demolished.
Skycoaster	Mardi Gras	2000	2005	Skycoaster Inc.	Reverse freefall swing	Demolished in March 2025.
Mega Zeph	Mardi Gras	2000	2005	Custom Coasters International	Double Out and Back wooden hybrid	Coaster rusted gradually over the years and part of the track eventually caved in. In November 2024, demolition started very little on a small part near the bend just before the station. By mid-January 2025, most of the first lift hill and track leading towards the bend over the lake had been demolished. Then on January 19, 2025 the coaster caught fire and demolition of the lift hill and more portions came down later on. A few sections still remain standing though. The sign was saved by the National Roller Coaster Museum and Archives and the trains were sent to Six Flags St. Louis. After the cars were used for parts on The Boss, they were sold to Pistone Scrap Processing in Canton, Ohio. On February 2, 2025, the main lift hill was torn down, the rest stayed until March when the entirety was demolished.
Mardi Gras Menagerie	Mardi Gras	2000	2005	Chance Morgan	Carousel	Carousel’s canopy structure had collapsed after the hurricane, all the horses were removed, and panels slowly were destroyed or stolen by scrappers over the years, the ride was almost entirely stripped to a skeleton with only a few panels remaining. The carousel's sign is now in the National Roller Coaster Museum and Archives. As of 2025, half of the frame had been ripped apart by demo crews, though it continued to stand until roughly late 2025 to early 2026.
Technicolor Tweety Balloons	Looney Tunes Adventures	2003	2005	Zamperla	Samba Tower	Demolished roughly late 2025 to early 2026.

=== Incident ===
On July 9, 2003, the Joker's Jukebox ride had started while a 52-year-old woman was attending to her grandson. She was hit twice by the moving ride and died from her injuries. The ride reopened on July 14, with additional mirrors to improve visibility for ride operators and a public address system for pre-recorded safety instructions and operator announcements.
