= DC Comics Super Heroes Adventures =

Former themed area

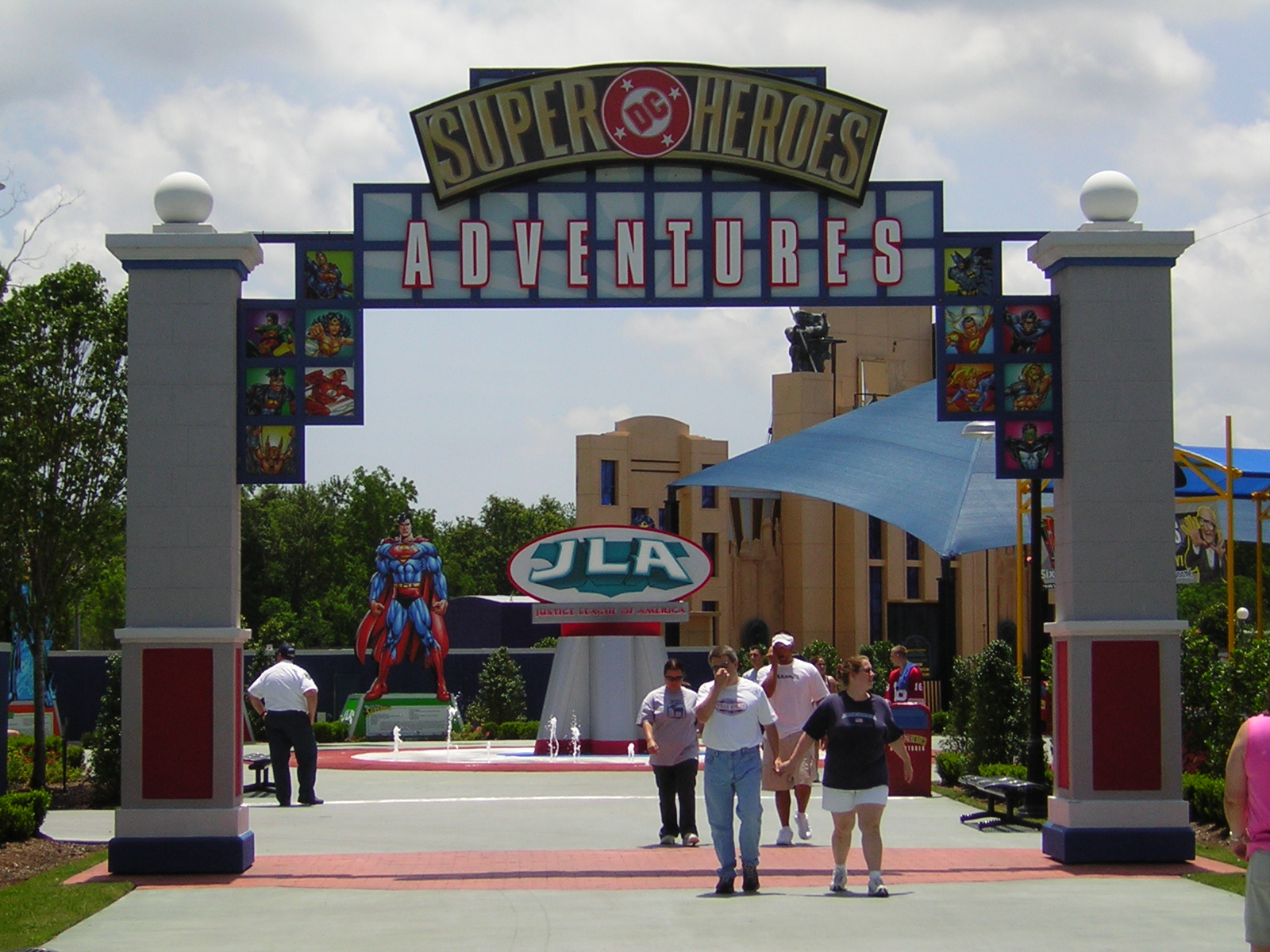
- Theme: DC Comics

Attractions
- Total: 4
- Other rides: 3
- Shows: 1

Six Flags New Orleans
- Status: Defunct
- Opened: April 12, 2003
- Closed: August 25, 2005

Six Flags New England
- Status: Defunct
- Opened: 2000
- Closed: 2020
- Replaced by: DC Universe

DC Comics Super Heroes Adventures was a DC Comics themed area found at Six Flags New Orleans, in the Eastern New Orleans area of New Orleans, Louisiana, USA. It opened on April 12, 2003, after Six Flags took over the lease of the park in 2002 and added the company's signature Warner Bros. characters and themes.

== History ==
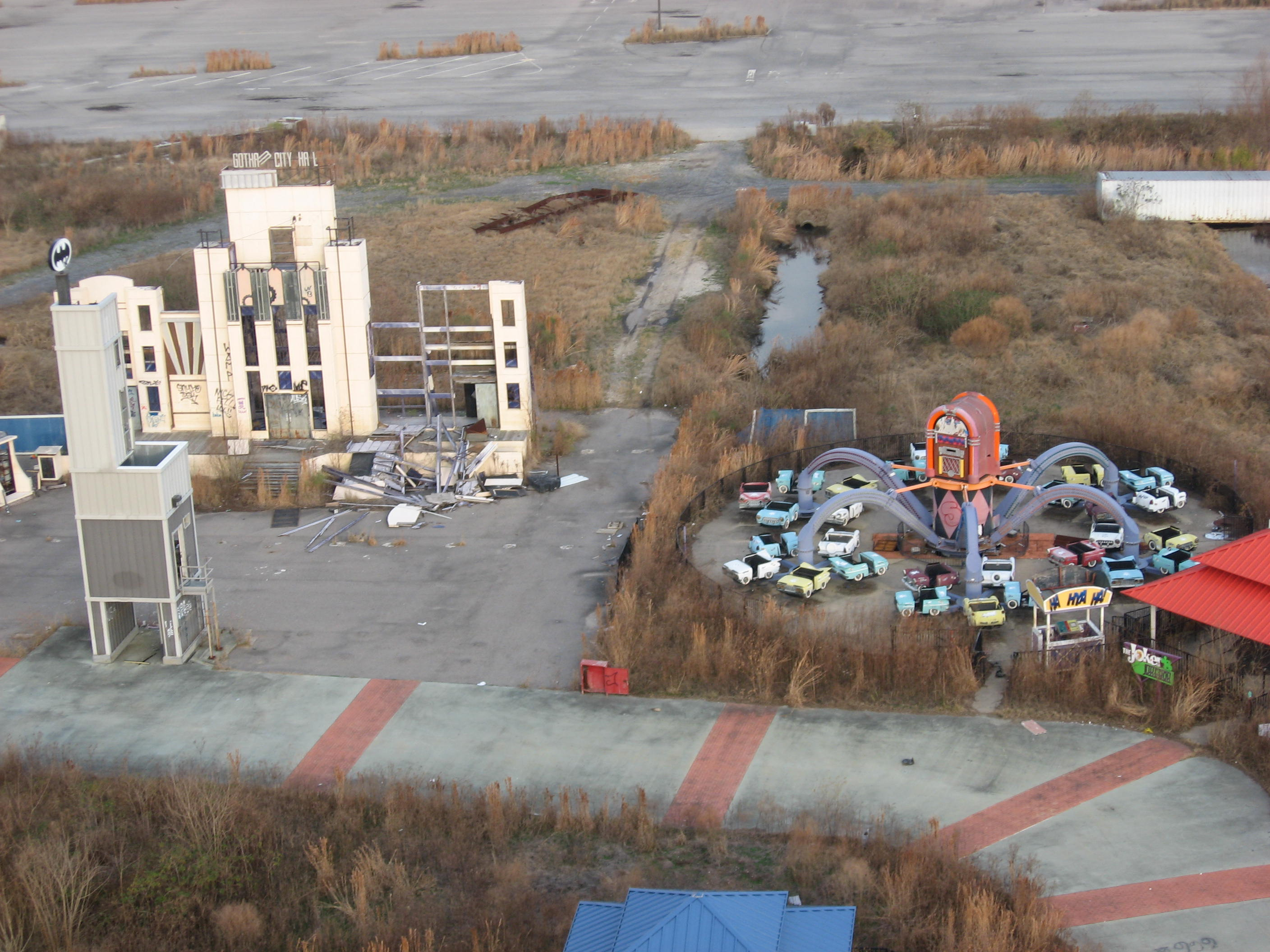
Gotham City Hall and Joker's Jukebox after Hurricane Katrina.

In 2002, Six Flags took over the lease of Jazzland (which opened in 2000) and re-branded the park Six Flags New Orleans a year later. With the park's new ownership, Six Flags added the new themed section DC Comics Super Heroes Adventures for 2003 season, themed after the DC Comics characters. Most of all the new attractions for the themed area were relocated from Thrill Valley, a theme park in Japan.

=== After Hurricane Katrina (2005-2025) ===
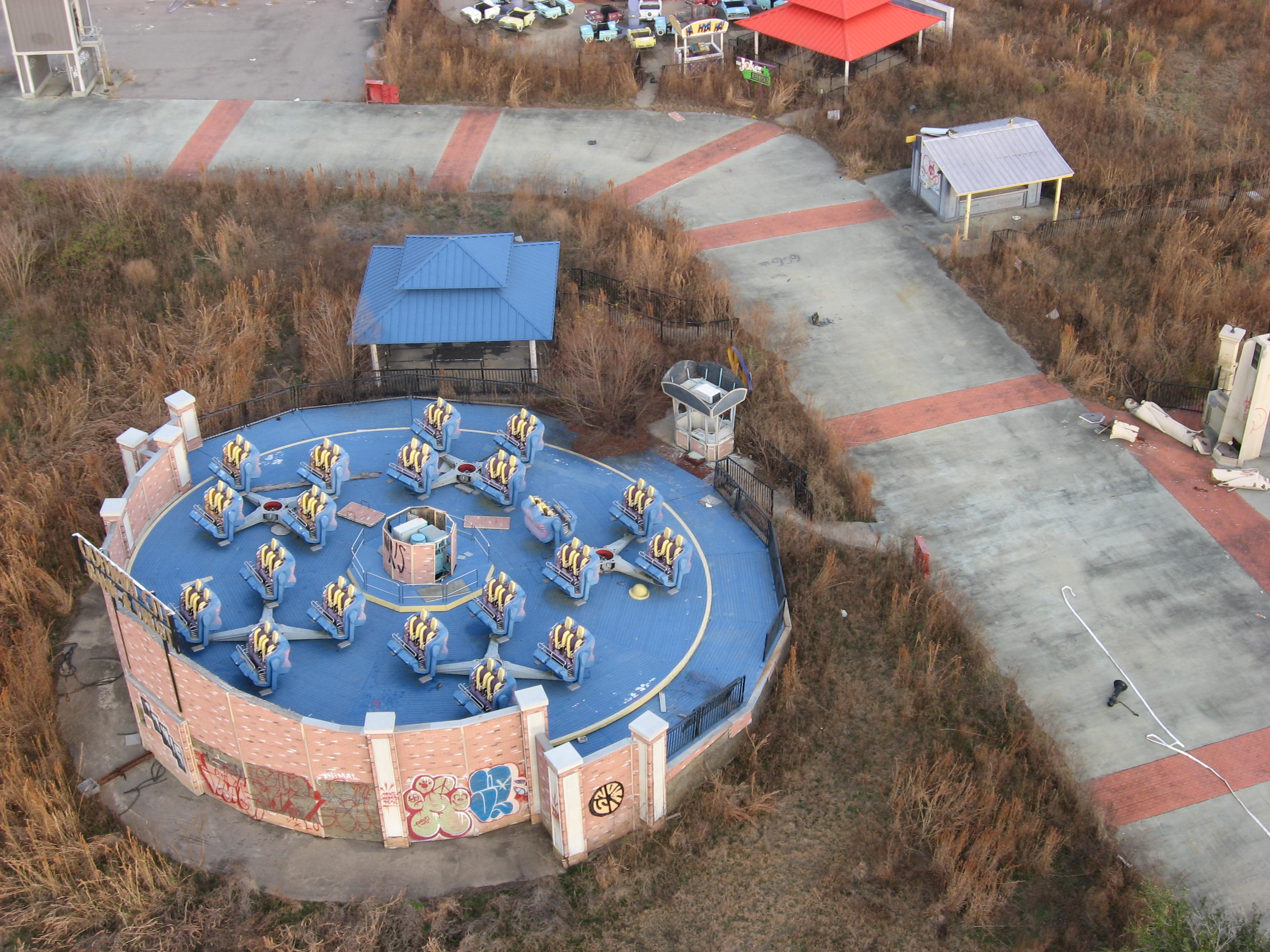
Catwoman's Whip after Katrina

When Hurricane Katrina hit the park on August 29, 2005, the park was severely flooded, causing the park to close down indefinitely. In 2007, Six Flags began the process of moving rides from the park to their other properties. Batman: The Ride was the first ride to leave the park, and was taken to Six Flags Fiesta Texas, where it was refurbished and reopened as Goliath on April 18, 2008. The park has been closed since 2005 and is no longer a Six Flags park, as it is now owned by the city of New Orleans. Despite Six Flags losing the park's lease to the city in 2009, all Looney Tunes and DC Comics theming stayed within the park itself. In 2024 demolition had begun on the property and the remaining rides in the area were demolished in November of 2024.

== Attractions ==
=== Theaters ===
- Gotham City Hall

== Former Attractions ==
- Batman: The Ride (Bolliger & Mabillard inverted coaster) - Removed in 2007 and taken to Six Flags Fiesta Texas where it was refurbished and renamed Goliath. The ride reopened on April 18, 2008.
- Catwoman's Whip (Mondial Shake) - Catwoman statue that stood in the center of the ride was salvaged and relocated to Six Flags New England to be used on their roller coaster of the same name. The rest of the ride remained on the property until it was finally demolished in 2024.
- Joker's Jukebox (Wieland Schwarzkopf Polyp) The Joker statue that stood on top the jukebox was salvaged and brought to the National Roller Coaster Museum and Archives in Plainview, Texas. The rest of the ride remained on the property until it was finally demolished in 2024.
- Lex Luthor's Invertatron (Soriani & Moser Super Loop on Top) Ride remained on property until it was demolished in 2024.

== Gallery ==
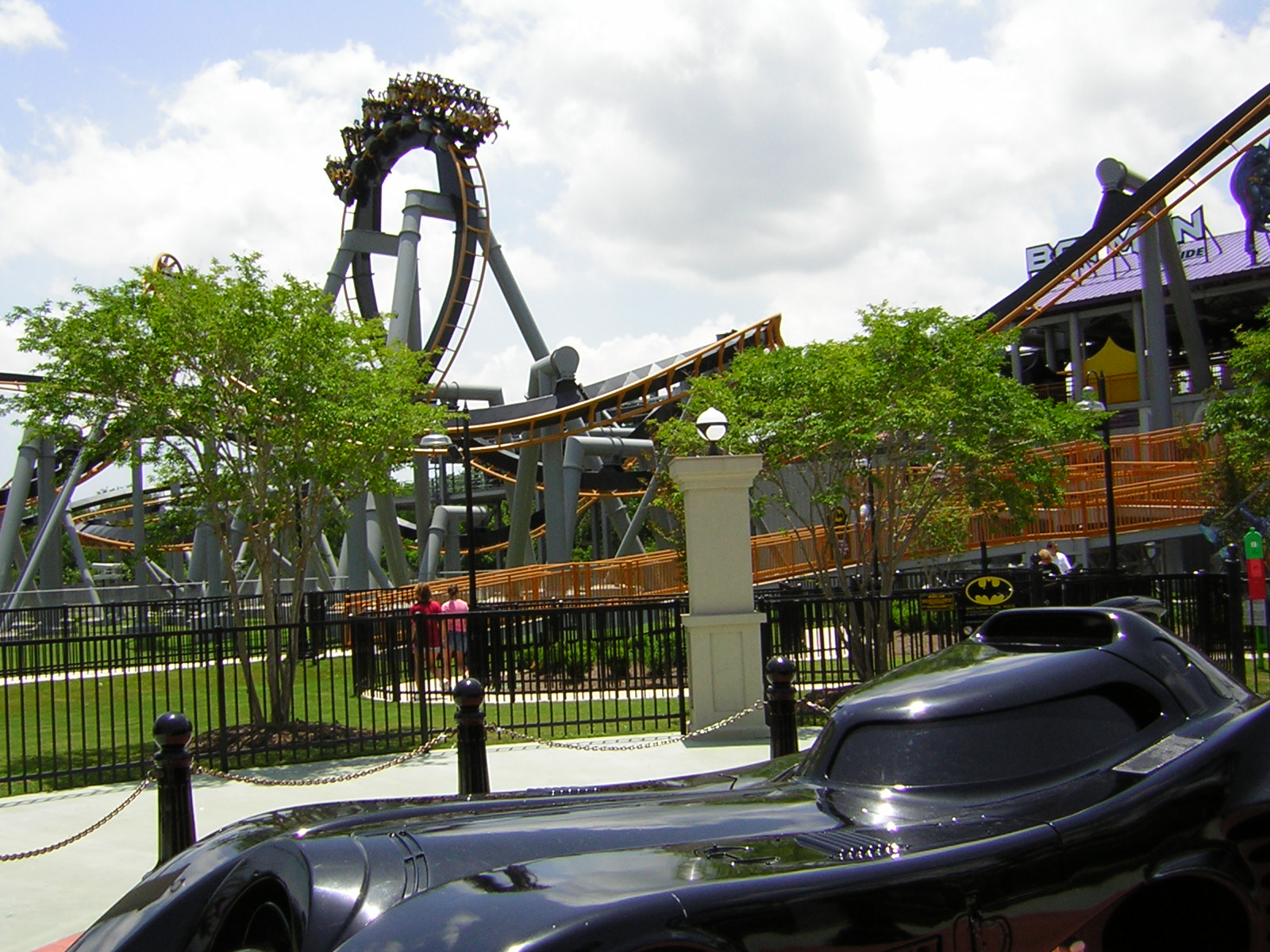
Batman: The Ride

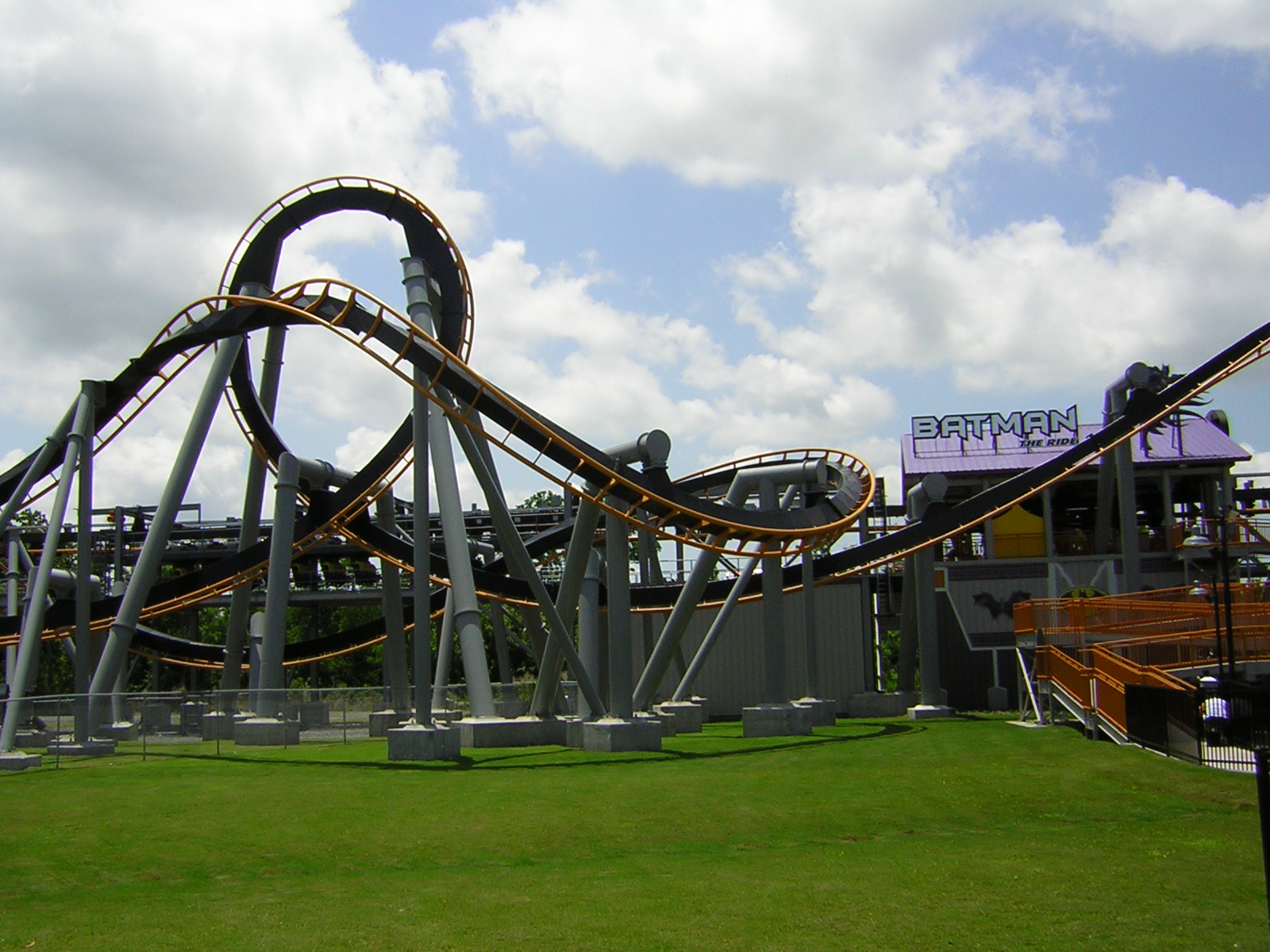
Batman: The Ride
