= Sasquatch (ride) =

Amusement ride at Great Escape in New York

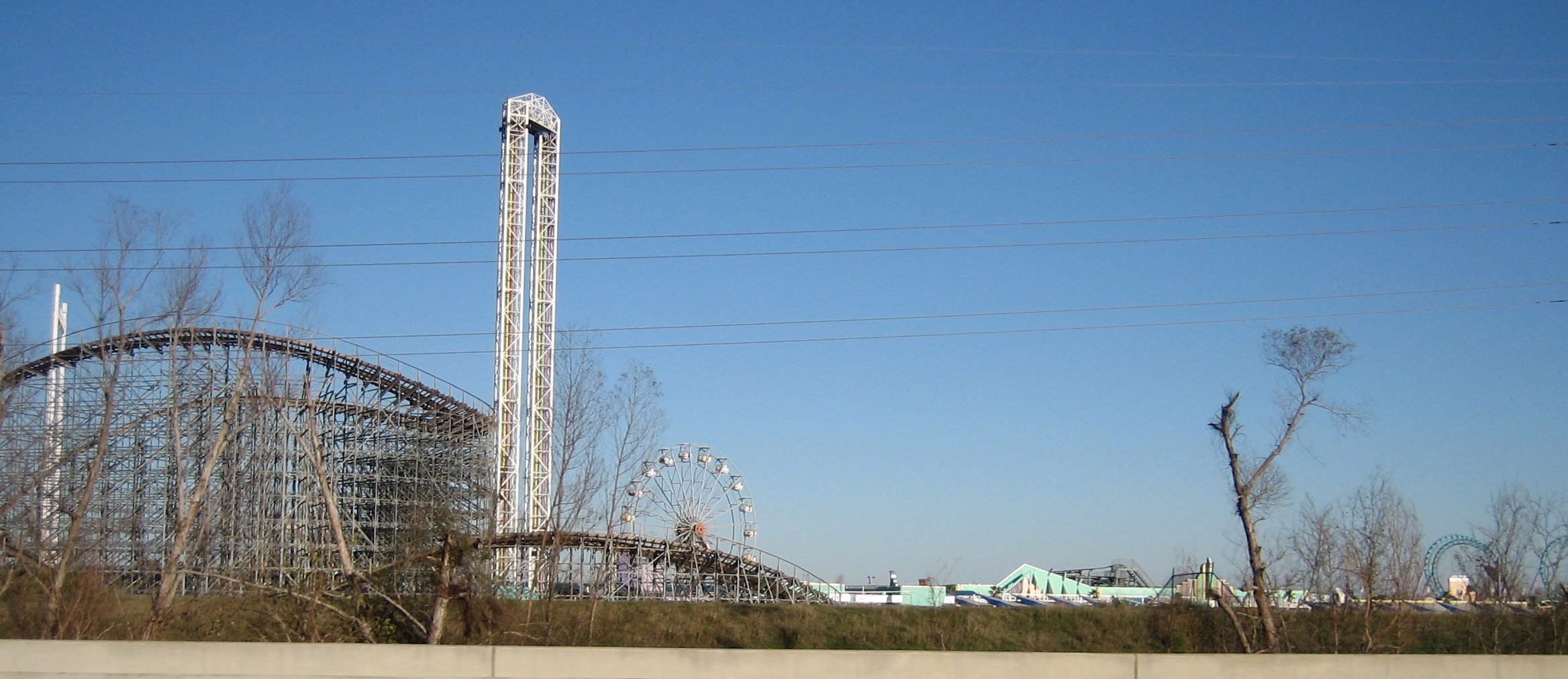
- Sasquatch at Six Flags New Orleans in 2006 when it was still known as Bayou Blaster and Sonic Slam

Great Escape by Enchanted Parks
- Area: Hot Rod USA
- Coordinates: 43°20′59.9″N 73°41′31″W
- Status: Operating
- Opening date: May 10, 2009
- Replaced: Rainbow

Six Flags New Orleans
- Name: Bayou Blaster and Sonic Slam
- Area: Mardi Gras
- Status: Removed
- Opening date: May 20, 2000
- Closing date: August 21, 2005

Ride statistics
- Attraction type: Combo tower
- Manufacturer: S&S Worldwide
- Height: 192 ft (59 m)
- Vehicles: 2
- Riders per vehicle: 12
- Rows: 4
- Riders per row: 3
- Height restriction: 48 in (122 cm)
- Previously known as: Sonic Slam and Bayou Blaster at Six Flags New Orleans (2000–2008)
- Fast Lane available

Sasquatch (formerly known as Bayou Blaster and Sonic Slam) is an S&S Worldwide combo Turbo Drop and Space Shot drop tower ride at Great Escape in Queensbury, New York, United States. It opened on May 10, 2009. The ride's name is derived from the cryptid Sasquatch.

The ride was originally located at Six Flags New Orleans under the names Bayou Blaster and Sonic Slam. When the park closed due to extensive damage from Hurricane Katrina in 2005, the ride was moved to Six Flags Great Escape and Hurricane Harbor.

== History ==
The ride first opened in 2000 as part of Jazzland's debut season ride lineup. It was known as Bayou Blaster and Sonic Slam. In 2002, Six Flags took over the lease of the park, and in 2003, the park's name was changed to Six Flags New Orleans.

After Hurricane Katrina hit the park on August 29, 2005, the park was severely flooded and damaged beyond proper salvage. Six Flags relocated several salvageable rides from the park to other parks in their chain, including Bayou Blaster and Sonic Slam. It was dismantled in 2008 and relocated to The Great Escape & Splashwater Kingdom, where the ride was refurbished, repainted, and renamed Sasquatch. The ride reopened on May 10, 2009 on the former site of Rainbow, which closed after the 2007 season. It is located in the Hot Rod USA section of the park.

== Ride experience ==
The ride contains two towers, a lift tower and a drop tower. On the drop tower, riders are slowly brought to the top and then dropped down at high speeds several times over. On the lift tower, riders are shot to the top in three seconds before dropping back down, and being launched again several times.

The two towers are referred to as Sasquatch Launch and Sasquatch Drop. Both towers stand at 192 feet (59 m) tall.
