= The Great White (SeaWorld San Antonio) =

Steel inverted roller coaster

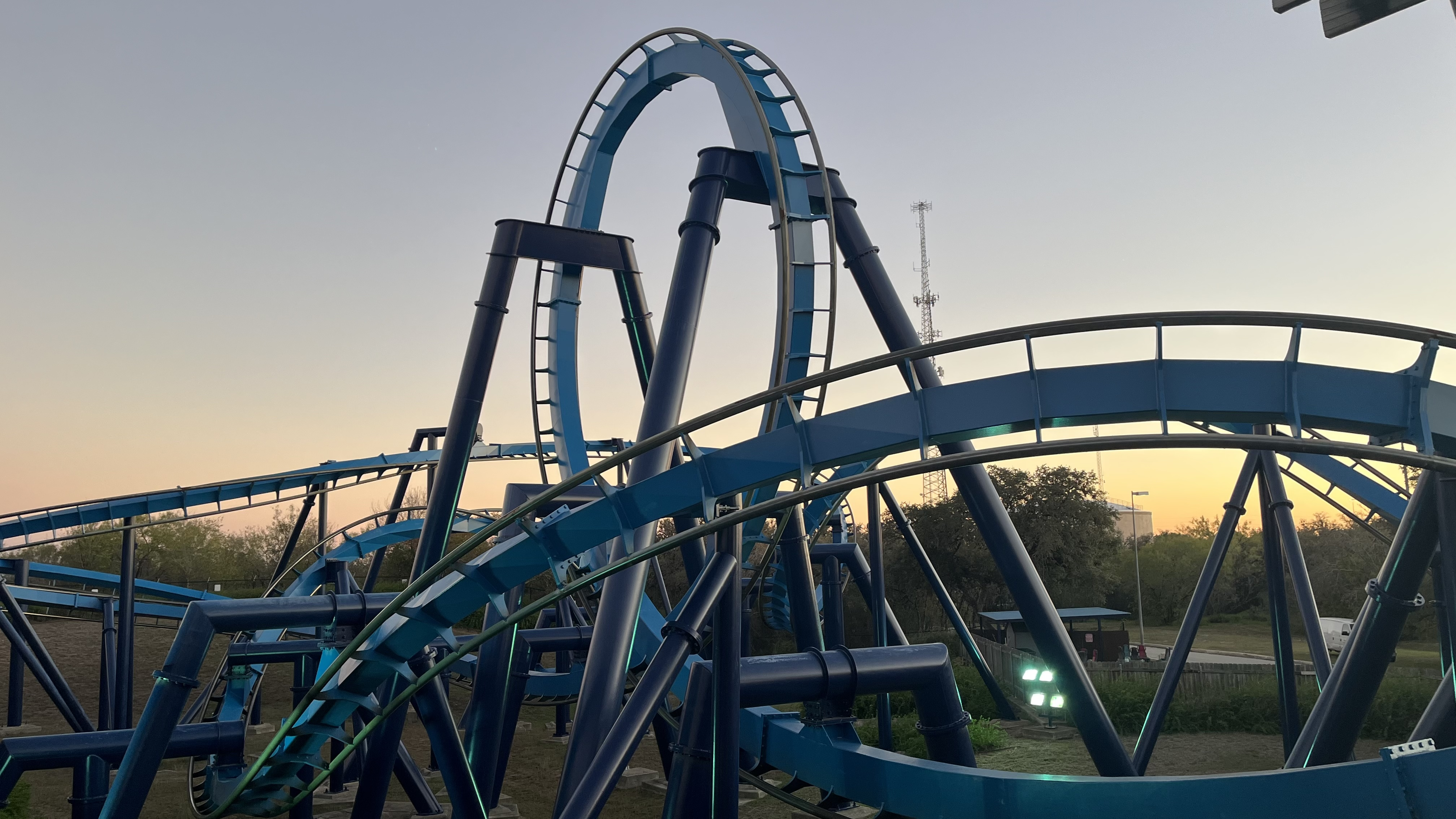
- The Great White

SeaWorld San Antonio
- Location: SeaWorld San Antonio
- Coordinates: 29.452270°N 98.696517°W
- Status: Operating
- Opening date: February 1997
- Cost: US$21,000,000

General statistics
- Type: Steel – Inverted
- Manufacturer: Bolliger & Mabillard
- Designer: Werner Stengel
- Model: Inverted Coaster - Batman
- Lift/launch system: Chain lift hill
- Height: 108 ft (33 m)
- Drop: 81.2 ft (24.7 m)
- Length: 2,562 ft (781 m)
- Speed: 50 mph (80 km/h)
- Inversions: 5
- Duration: 2:00
- Capacity: 1400 riders per hour
- G-force: 4.6
- Height restriction: 54 in (137 cm)
- Trains: 2 trains with 8 cars; riders arranged 4 across in a single row for a total of 32 riders per train
- Quick Queue available
- The Great White at RCDB

The Great White is an inverted roller coaster at SeaWorld San Antonio, and the first roller coaster to be built at a SeaWorld park. It was the first inverted roller coaster to be built in Texas.

== Characteristics ==
Despite its shortened track length, The Great White follows an almost identical ride layout as the Batman the Ride coasters at numerous Six Flags parks. Within San Antonio, Six Flags Fiesta Texas operates the same model as the Chupacabra. At 2,562 feet (about 150 shorter than Batman's 2,693 foot layout), the coaster doesn't allow riders as much time to "recuperate" between inversions, consequently offering an extreme, forceful ride experience. Furthermore, The Great White sits lower to the ground, often deceiving its riders with elements such as "foot-choppers" as there are many trees and shrubs surrounding the coaster's track. The Great White is sometimes considered to be more intense than its cousin at Six Flags because of its added 8th row (Chupacabra has only seven rows per train) and shorter track length (2,562 feet, compared to Chupacabra’s 2,700 feet). Its layout consists of the following inversions:

- a Vertical Loop
- a Zero-G Roll
- a second Vertical Loop
- a Wingover
- a second Wingover

When The Great White opened, its queue line wrapped around a large-scale shark aquarium, similar to the manta aquariums found in SeaWorld Orlando's eponymous flying coaster Manta, opened in 2009. Unlike Manta, however, The Great White did not offer separate entrances for riders and non-riders to view its aquarium exhibit. The display was later removed. SeaWorld San Antonio's shark exhibit was relocated to Discovery Point's 450,000 gallon Explorer's Reef aquarium, which additionally offers Shark Tours.
