= The Jester (roller coaster) =

Former roller coaster

- Previously known as The Joker's Revenge at Six Flags Fiesta Texas (1996-2002)
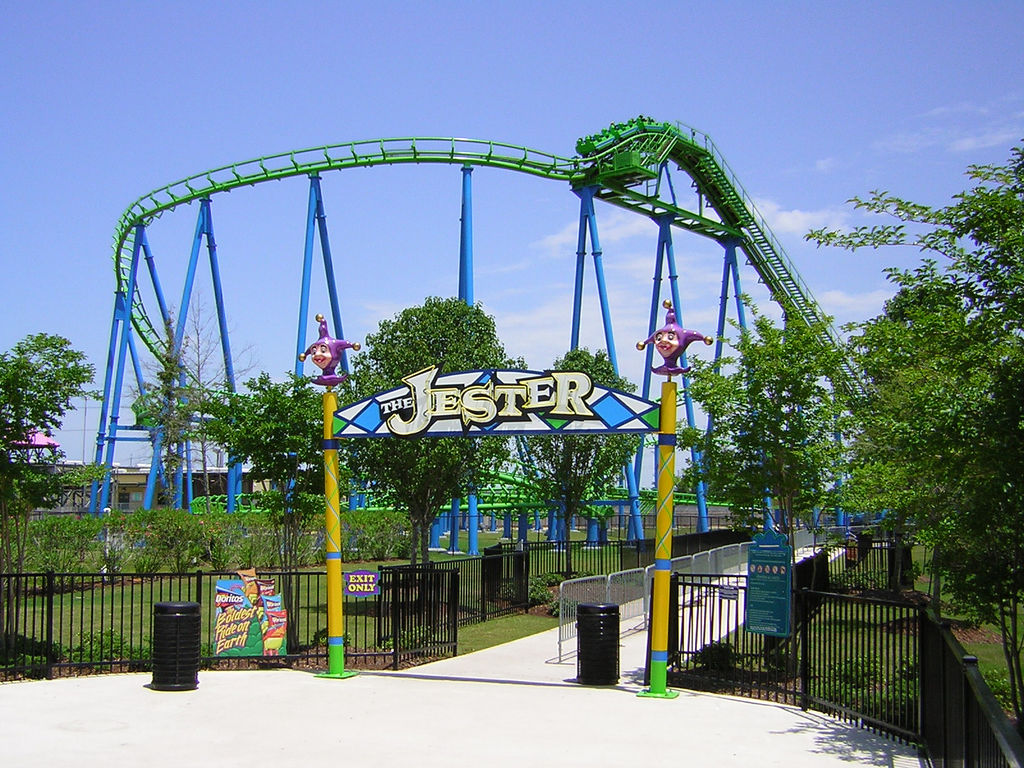

Six Flags New Orleans
- Park section: Mardi Gras
- Coordinates: 30.054485°N 89.936552°W
- Status: Removed
- Opening date: April 13, 2003
- Closing date: August 21, 2005
- The Jester at Six Flags New Orleans at RCDB

Six Flags Fiesta Texas
- Name: The Joker's Revenge
- Park section: Fiesta Bay Boardwalk
- Coordinates: 29.5995°N 98.6094°W
- Status: Removed
- Opening date: May 10, 1996
- Closing date: 2001
- Cost: $4,300,000 USD
- Replaced by: Pandemonium
- The Joker's Revenge at Six Flags Fiesta Texas at RCDB

General statistics
- Type: Steel
- Manufacturer: Vekoma
- Model: Hurricane
- Lift/launch system: Chain lift hill
- Height: 79 ft (24 m)
- Drop: 69 ft (21 m)
- Length: 1,936 ft (590 m)
- Speed: 40 mph (64 km/h)
- Inversions: 3
- Duration: 1:24
- Max vertical angle: 40°
- Capacity: 1200 riders per hour
- G-force: 3.5
- Height restriction: 48 in (122 cm)
- Trains: 2 trains with 7 cars; riders arranged 2 across in 2 rows for a total of 28 riders per train

The Jester was a steel roller coaster located at the now demolished Six Flags New Orleans amusement park in New Orleans. Built and designed by Vekoma, the ride originally opened at Six Flags Fiesta Texas in 1996 as The Joker's Revenge. After its closure in 2001, the coaster was sent to Six Flags New Orleans where it became The Jester. The ride opened to the public at Six Flags New Orleans on April 13, 2003. Following the devastation to the amusement park in August 2005 by Hurricane Katrina, the roller coaster ceased operation following the park's closure but remained standing until its demolition in 2024.

== History ==
=== Six Flags Fiesta Texas (1996–2002) ===
When Fiesta Texas in San Antonio, Texas was bought out from Time Warner in 1996 (the owner of Six Flags at the time), they helped rebrand the park into Six Flags Fiesta Texas. Time Warner saw the opportunity to advertise and promote their latest movies through their Six Flags parks, so they added The Joker's Revenge, the first Vekoma Hurricane roller coaster in the United States and the first Vekoma roller coaster to run backwards a full circuit. It would be placed towards the back of the park in the Fiesta Bay Boardwalk section next to the quarry wall.

Construction of Joker's Revenge began in late 1995 and was completed in April 1996. On May 10, 1996, the ride officially made its debut. It was the park's first roller coaster to be themed to a DC Comics character and feature inversions. During the opening week, park employees were dressed in yellow jackets and green colored hair. One defining feature of the ride was its funhouse queue line, which featured flashing lights and upside down furniture. It had magenta track, magenta supports and light yellow trains manufactured by Arrow Dynamics.

While it was one of the best rides at Fiesta Texas when it opened in 1996, Joker's Revenge would not fare well by the early 2000s as guests would complain about how rough the ride experience had become. Plus, the ride was facing mechanical issues. The coaster was closed down in 2001 and did not operate at all during the 2002 season. Then in late 2002, it was dismantled and moved to Six Flags New Orleans. The funhouse queue line was reused for the park's Brutal Planet Haunted House during Fright Fest that year. In 2007, Pandemonium opened in the former spot of Joker's Revenge. The attraction would reuse its predecessor's queue bridge and funhouse. The latter was used as an extended indoor queue area.

Another Joker-themed attraction opened in 2019 called The Joker: Carnival of Chaos. It is a Zamperla Giant Discovery frisbee ride that features a funhouse queue just like the original attraction.

=== Six Flags New Orleans (2003–2005) ===
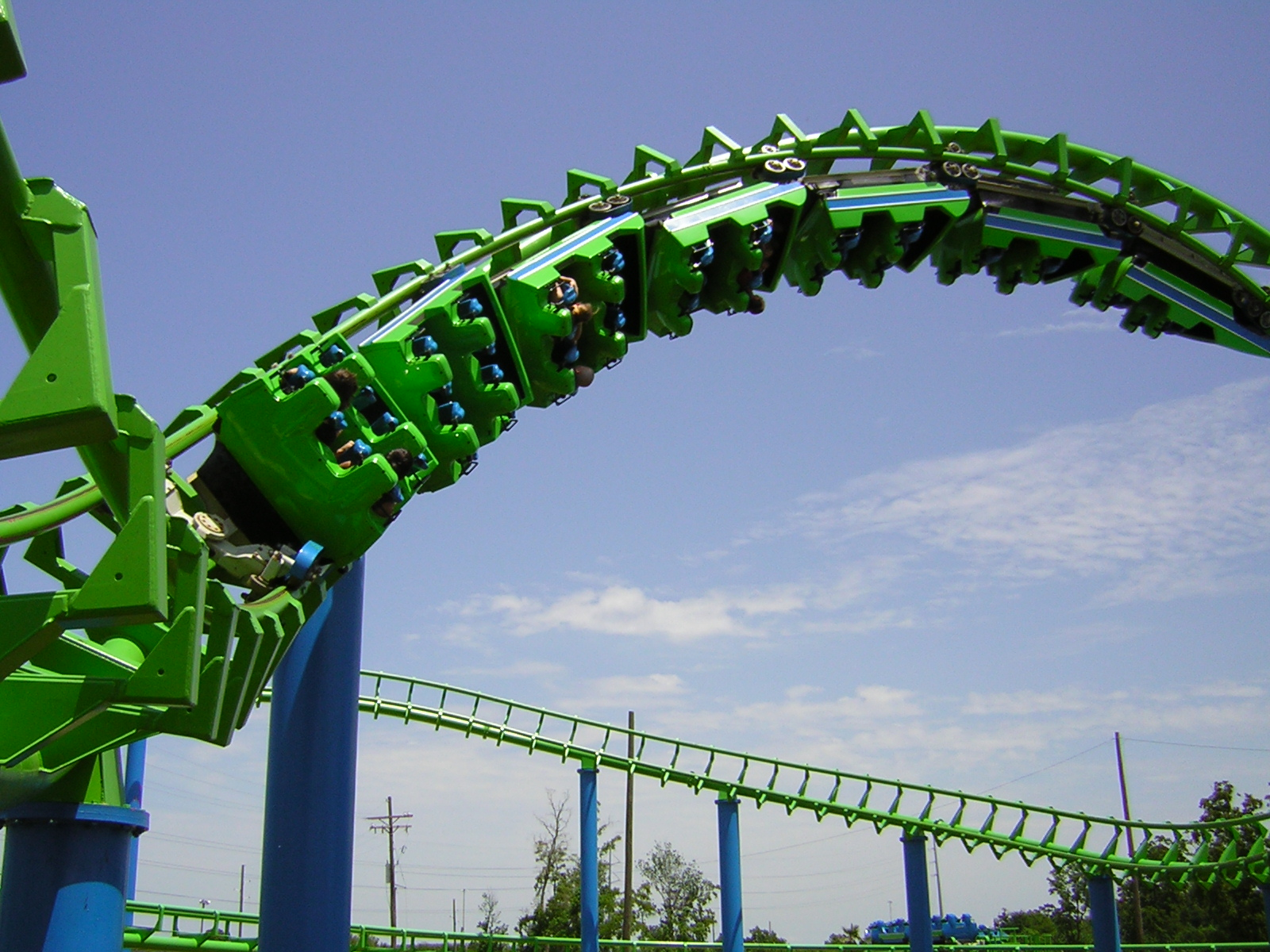
One of The Jester's trains going through a corkscrew

Six Flags took over the lease of Jazzland in 2002, operating it as "Jazzland" for the 2002 season, before changing the park's name in 2003 to Six Flags New Orleans for the 2003 season. Before the 2003 season, the park opened a whole new selection of rides including moving The Joker's Revenge roller coaster from Fiesta Texas in San Antonio to the park in New Orleans and renamed it The Jester in the Mardi Gras section of the park. The coaster, which still ran backwards, was given a new color scheme of Green and Blue.

When Hurricane Katrina hit the park on August 29, 2005, the park was severely flooded, causing Six Flags New Orleans to permanently shut down. It is now owned by the city of New Orleans.

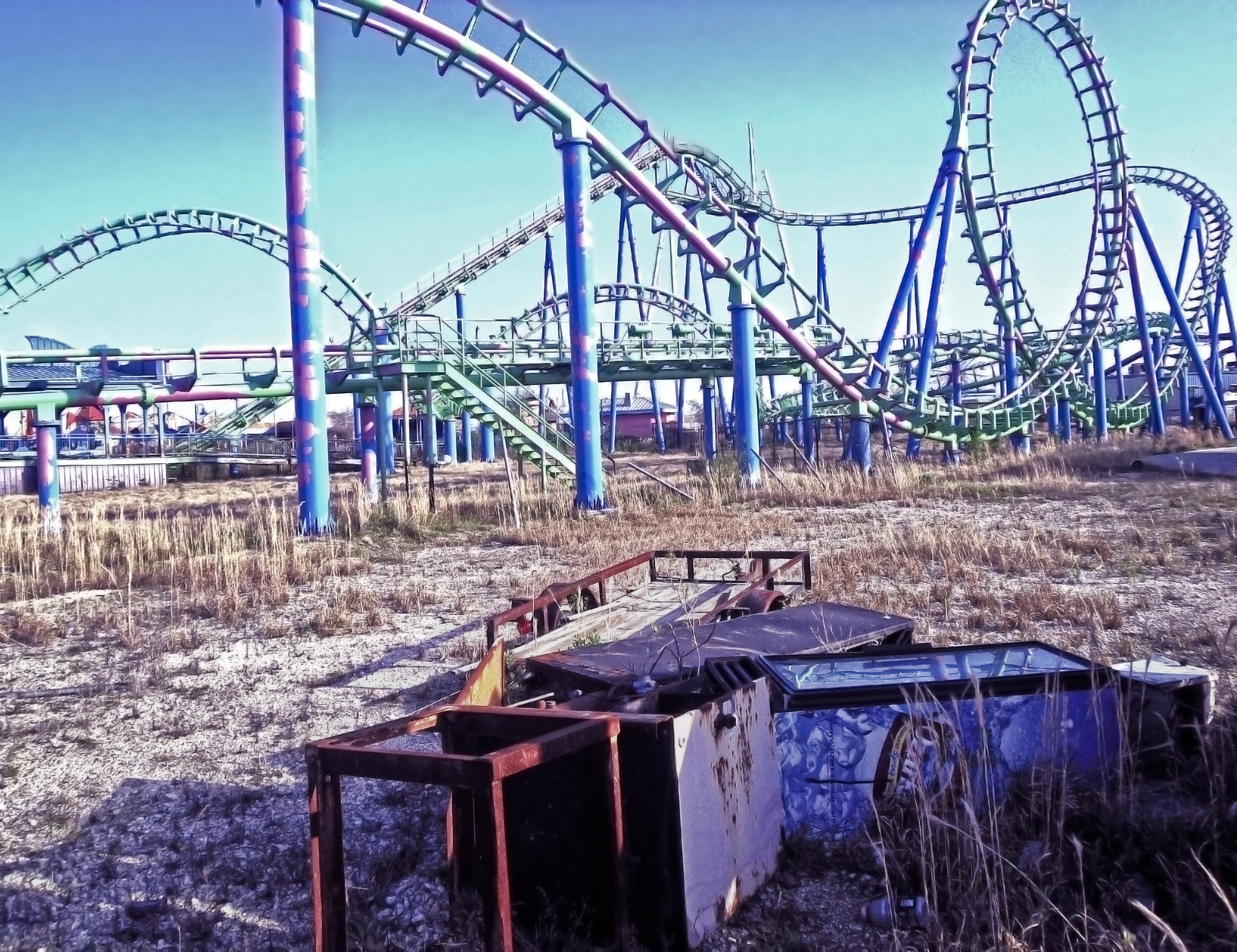
Ruins of The Jester in 2009.

In 2007 Six Flags began the process of moving rides from the park to their other properties. While Batman: The Ride, Bayou Blaster, Sonic Slam and Road Runner Express had all been removed by 2009 and sent to other Six Flags parks, The Jester stood abandoned at the New Orleans park until its demolition in 2024.

== Ride experience ==
Once riders would board one of the Jester's two trains, a train would then take riders up a 79-foot (24 m) tall lift hill. After the train went up the lift hill, it would then loop around and drop at speeds up to 40 miles per hour (64 km/h) through a 58-foot (18 m) vertical loop and then the train would loop around over the station to the ride's 24-foot (7.3 m) double corkscrew. Once the train passed the double corkscrews it would then take riders through a double helix's before entering the brake run that took rides back to the station. There are two Vekoma Hurricane's in the world and The Jester was the only one to take riders backwards throughout the whole course of the coaster. The other Vekoma Hurricane is located at Walygator Parc as The Comet which only travels riders forwards and not backwards.
