= Batman: The Ride =

Roller coasters at seven Six Flags parks

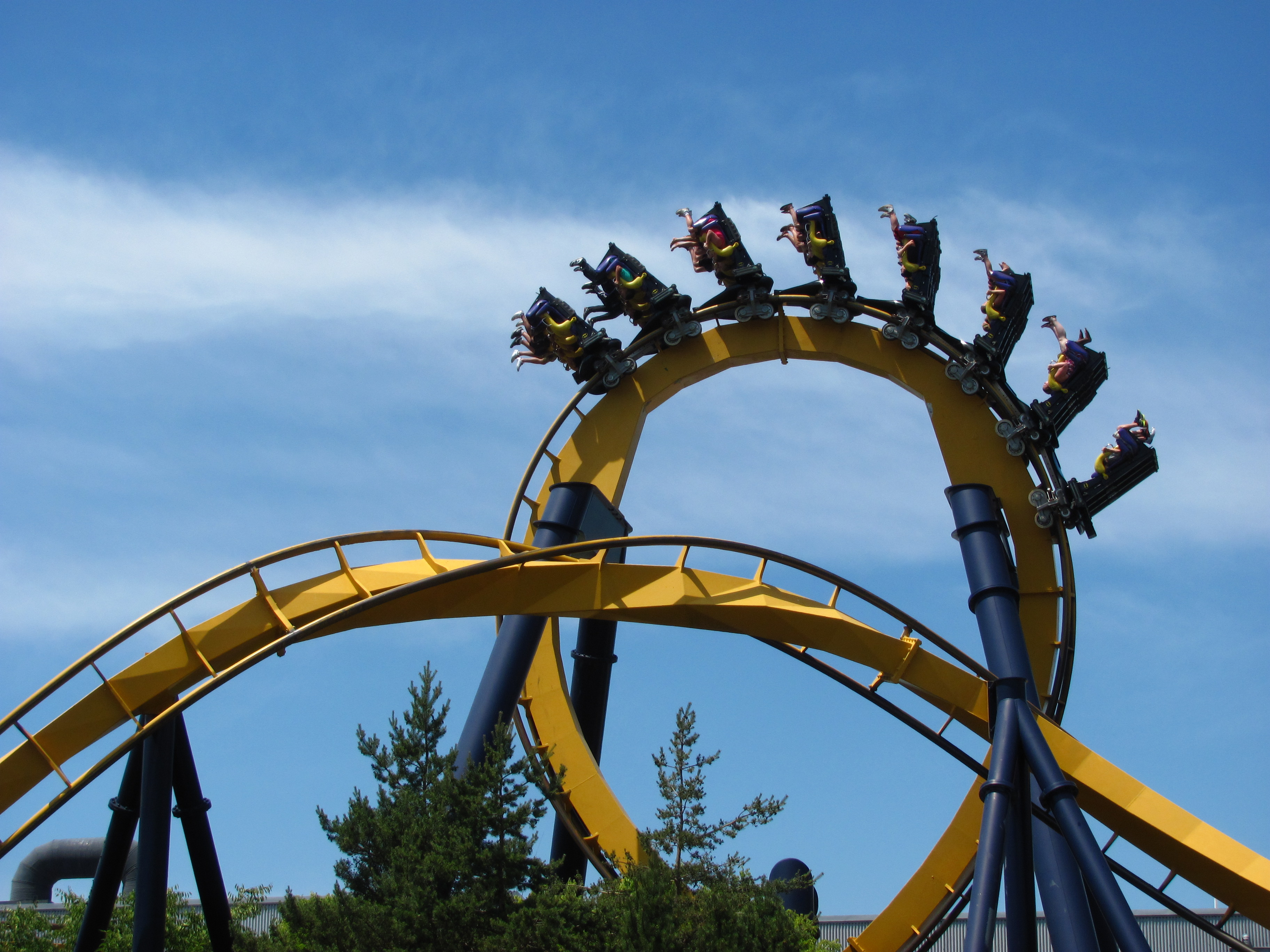
- A vertical loop and corkscrew on the ride at Six Flags Great America

General statistics
- Type: Steel – Inverted
- Manufacturer: Bolliger & Mabillard
- Designer: Werner Stengel
- Model: Inverted Coaster – Batman
- Lift/launch system: Chain lift hill
- Inversions: 5
- Duration: 1:45
- Capacity: 1280–1400 riders per hour
- G-force: 4
- Restraint style: Over-the-shoulder
- Height restriction: 54 in (137 cm)
- Trains: 2 trains with 8 cars; riders arranged 4 across in a single row for a total of 32 riders per train
- Height: 100 or 105 ft (30 or 32 m)
- Length: 2,693 or 2,700 ft (821 or 823 m)
- Speed: 50 mph (80 km/h)
- Drop: 84.5 ft
- Fast Lane available

Batman: The Ride is an inverted roller coaster based on the DC Comics character Batman and found at six Six Flags theme parks and at Mid America Adventure in the United States. Built by consulting engineers Bolliger & Mabillard, it rises to a height of between 100 and 105 feet (30 and 32 m) and reaches top speeds of 50 mph (80 km/h). The original roller coaster at Six Flags Great America was partially devised by the park's general manager Jim Wintrode. Batman: The Ride was the world's first inverted roller coaster when it opened in 1992, and has since been awarded Coaster Landmark status by the American Coaster Enthusiasts. Clones of the ride exist at amusement parks around the world.

== History ==
The concept of an inverted roller coaster with inversions was developed by Jim Wintrode, the general manager of Six Flags Great America, in the early 1990s. To develop the idea for the park, Wintrode worked with Walter Bolliger and Claude Mabillard – from Swiss roller coaster manufacturer Bolliger & Mabillard – and engineer Robert Mampe. The ride soft opened to the public on May 2, 1992, with an official opening one week later on May 9. The ride cost $7 million to build. At the time, it was the single biggest investment made by Six Flags Great America on one attraction. On November 19, 1992, during the park's offseason, a welding truck parked next to the attraction caught fire, leading to minor damage to the ride itself.

Following the ride's success, then-parent company Time Warner devised an expansion plan to install clones of the original at the rest of the US parks in the Six Flags chain throughout the 1990s. In 1992, Six Flags Great Adventure announced the addition of Batman: The Ride in place of Lightnin' Loops. It opened to the general public on May 1, 1993. Six Flags Magic Mountain announced the addition of their installation on August 4, 1993. The attraction opened on March 26, 1994 as part of a new Gotham City Backlot section.

On September 7, 1994, then-named Six Flags St. Louis announced that they would be receiving their installation of Batman: The Ride. The attraction opened on April 22, 1995 and was the first location to be a flipped clone and feature a different queue line. Six Flags Over Georgia announced the ride in 1996 as part of a new Gotham City section, which became the largest investment in 30 years for the park. It opened for the first time on May 3, 1997.

Six Flags Over Texas announced a copy of Batman: The Ride on November 4, 1998. The ride would sit next to Mr. Freeze, being located towards the back of the park in a new Gotham City area. Batman: The Ride made its debut at Six Flags Over Texas on May 26, 1999. This location features a unique loading station themed as the Wayne Foundation Industrial Park, unlike the others which are labeled Gotham Public Works. As new Batman films were being released, Six Flags St. Louis opened their installation to coincide with 1995's Batman Forever, while Six Flags Over Georgia debuted theirs to coincide with 1997's Batman & Robin.

In 2002, La Ronde in Montreal opened a mirror clone of the ride under the name Le Vampire (The Vampire). The name was the result of La Ronde, which is not a branded Six Flags park, lacking the necessary brand licensing agreement with Warner Bros. and DC Comics. It was expected to receive the Batman label when the park was scheduled to be converted to a Six Flags park in the mid-2000s, however, the plans were abandoned. Also in 2002, Warner Bros. Movie World Madrid opened another clone named Batman: La Fuga (Batman: The Escape).

The final installation was constructed at Six Flags New Orleans in 2003, which was formerly located at Japanese amusement park Thrill Valley, where it operated as Gambit from 1995 to 2002. In 2005, the park was flooded during Hurricane Katrina, resulting in Six Flags abandoning the property. The coaster remained abandoned for two years before being relocated to Six Flags Fiesta Texas, where it was refurbished and repainted. The ride reopened as Goliath on April 18, 2008, and was renamed Chupacabra in 2024.

From 2013 to 2015, the Batman: The Ride coasters at five locations operated backwards at different times throughout the three years. On February 1, 2018, it was announced that the St. Louis location would run backwards for the first half of the 2018 season.

== Installations ==
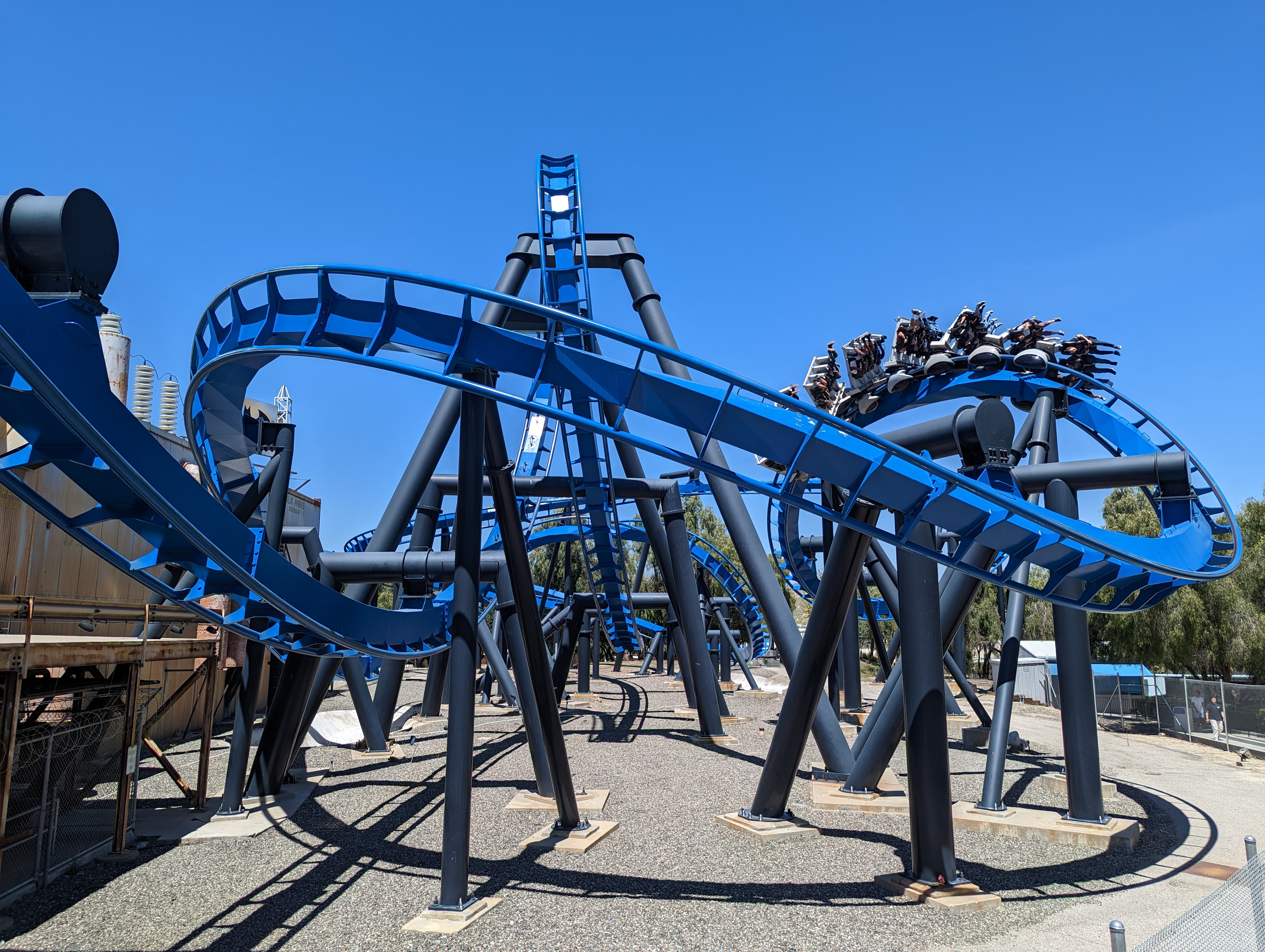
Batman: The Ride at Six Flags Magic Mountain

Locations for Batman: The Ride
Park	Area	Opening date	Status	Ref.
Six Flags Great America	DC Universe (Note: Originally Yankee Harbor until the 2022 season.)	May 9, 1992	Operating	
Six Flags Great Adventure	Movie Town	May 1, 1993	Operating	
Six Flags Magic Mountain	DC Universe	March 26, 1994	Operating	
Mid America Adventure	Studio Backlot	April 22, 1995	Operating	
Six Flags Over Georgia	Gotham City	May 3, 1997	Operating	
Six Flags Over Texas	Gotham City	May 26, 1999	Operating	
Six Flags New Orleans	DC Comics Super Hero Adventures	April 12, 2003	Relocated and renamed (Note: The roller coaster was relocated to Six Flags Fiesta Texas and currently operates as Chupacabra.)	

== Characteristics ==
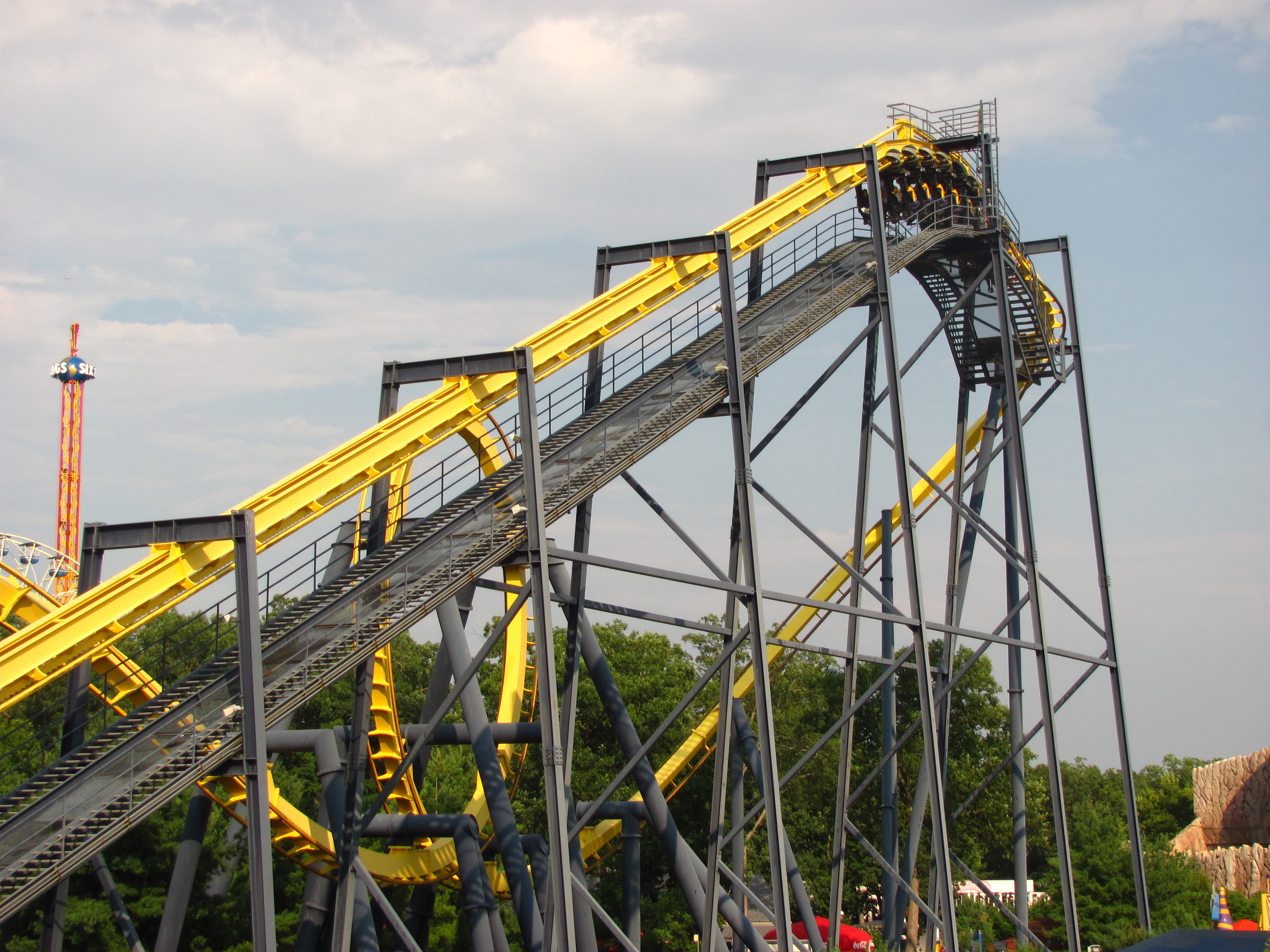
An overview of the ride's first drop and vertical loop at Six Flags Great Adventure

=== Structure ===
The original installation of the ride at Six Flags Great America features a maximum height of 100 feet (30 m), while the installations to follow reached 105 feet (32 m). Each installation of Batman: The Ride has a track length of approximately 2,700 feet (820 m). The rides reach a top speed of 50 miles per hour (80 km/h) and exert up to four times the force of gravity. There are five inversions, which are two vertical loops, a zero-g roll and two corkscrews. (Note: See:)

Batman: The Ride clones operate with two steel and fiberglass trains, each containing eight cars. Each car seats four riders in a single row for a total of 32 riders per train.

The ride's original layout was specifically designed to fit in the Yankee Harbor (now DC Universe) themed area at Six Flags Great America, on the space previously occupied by Tidal Wave. The layout for each successive attraction is either identical or a mirror image of the original.

=== Color scheme ===
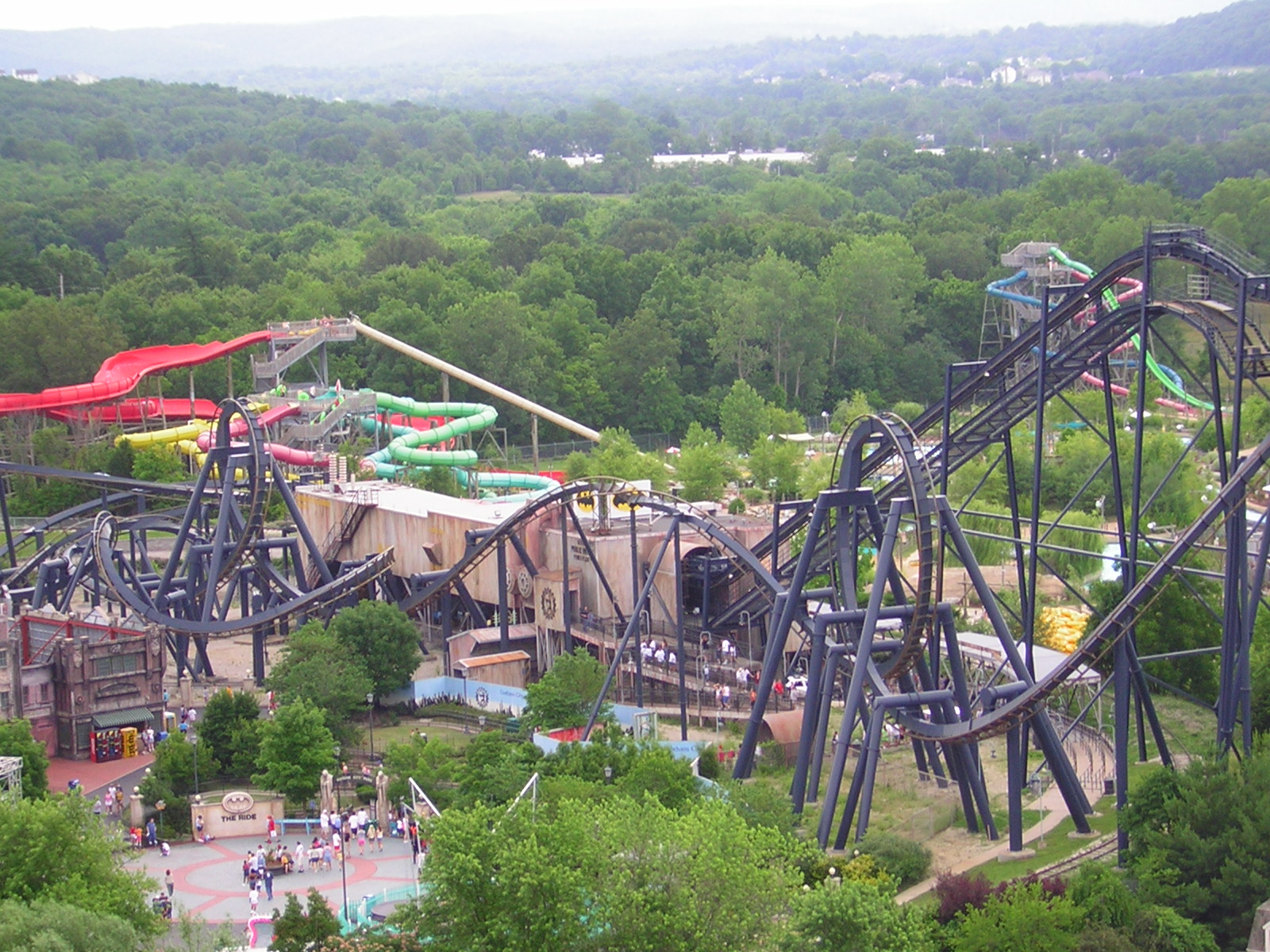
Batman: The Ride at Mid America Adventure

While some later Batman: The Ride clones opened with dark blue track and supports, the originals were all black. Over the years there have been modifications in Batman: The Ride color schemes, with more incorporating yellows, blues and purples. The original ride at Six Flags Great America retained the original black color scheme until 2004, when the track was painted yellow and supports dark purple. That year, the Six Flags Great Adventure location's original black color scheme was repainted with yellow track. For the 2010 season, the Six Flags Magic Mountain and Six Flags Over Georgia locations were both repainted with medium blue track.

== Ride experience ==
=== Queue ===
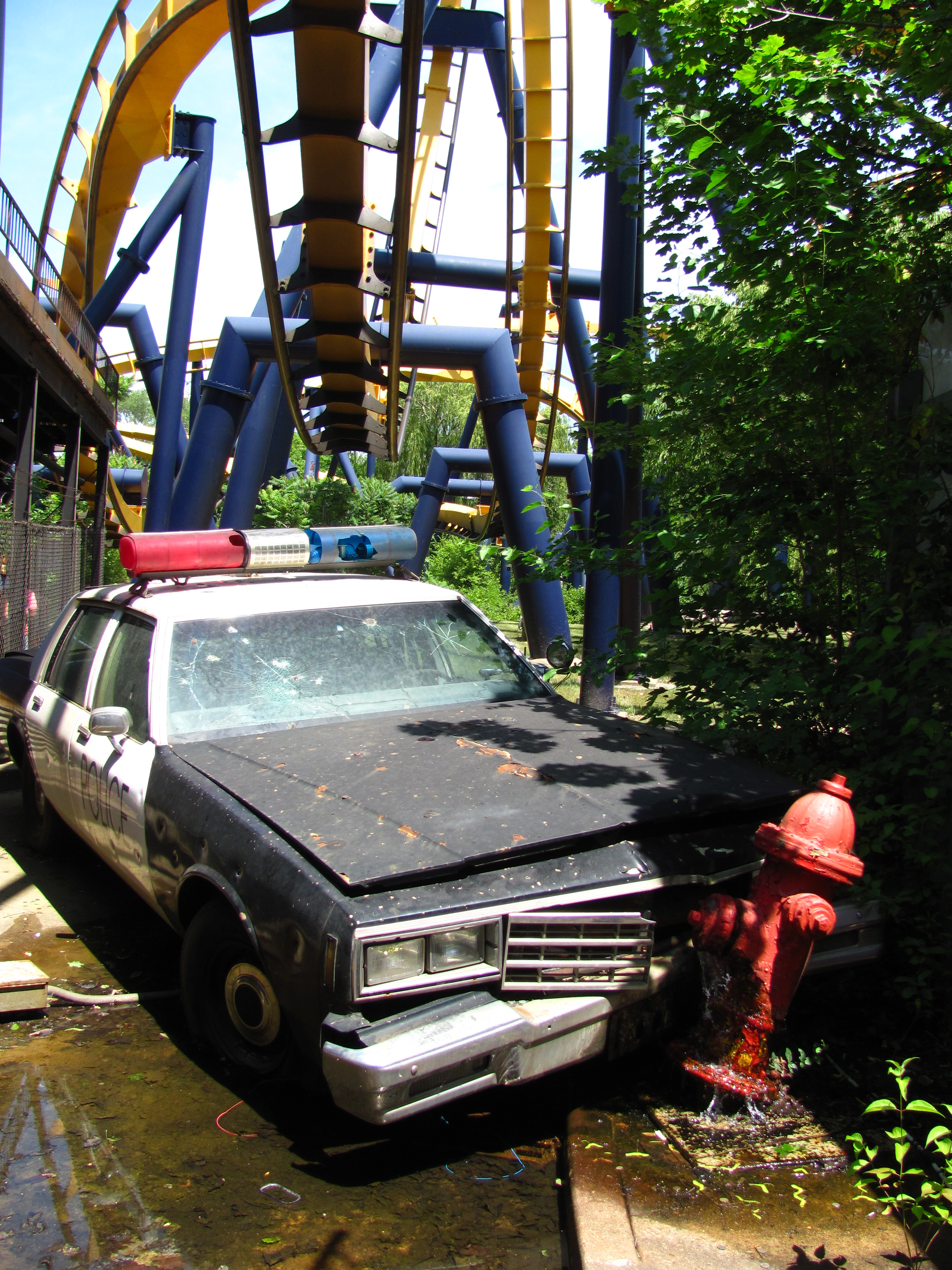
Batman: The Ride theming at Six Flags Great America

The decorative theme of Batman: The Ride attempts to capture the spirit of the fictional Gotham City for those queuing to board the ride. As the queue moves through Gotham City Park, the theme transitions from bright and peaceful, to dark and ominous. Modeled after Nigel Phelps' award-winning art direction on the 1989 film Batman, the atmosphere indicates a crime-ridden and dirty environment, with discarded pieces of equipment, crumbling concrete, and in some versions, a Gotham City Police Department car riddled with bullet holes. After the outside queue, guests enter the ride structure through an entrance themed after an access to a storm drain. The ride passenger loading area is modeled after Batman's Batcave and features a replica of the Batsuit from the 1989 film.

=== Layout ===
Batman: The Ride begins with the track floor in the station descending. The train moves out of the station and up a chain lift hill. At the top of the hill, the train dips down through a Bolliger & Mabillard pre-drop, coasts down a 190-degree swoop to the left and drops into the first vertical loop. It then flips through a Heartline Spin (zero-G roll), followed by another vertical loop. The train then travels upward around a tight spiral to the left, then through a wider turn to the right, drops slightly and quickly turns through the first corkscrew (referred to as a "flatspin" by the manufacturer). Following this is a tight right turn and another flatspin, then a tight left turnaround before the train enters the final brake run.

== Incidents ==
- On May 26, 2002, a 58-year-old park employee working in the roller coaster's restricted area at Six Flags Over Georgia was killed after being struck in the head by the dangling leg of a 14-year-old girl riding in the front. The girl was hospitalized with a leg injury.
- On June 28, 2008, a 17-year-old South Carolina teenager was killed after being struck and decapitated by the Batman roller coaster at Six Flags Over Georgia. The teen, who was on a trip to the park with his church's youth group, scaled two fences with a friend into a restricted area and walked into the ride's path. Although witnesses originally stated he was trying to retrieve his hat and or to touch the ride as it went by, a Cobb County police spokesman reported the teens were attempting to take a shortcut to re-ride the ride to get in line first.

== Reception ==
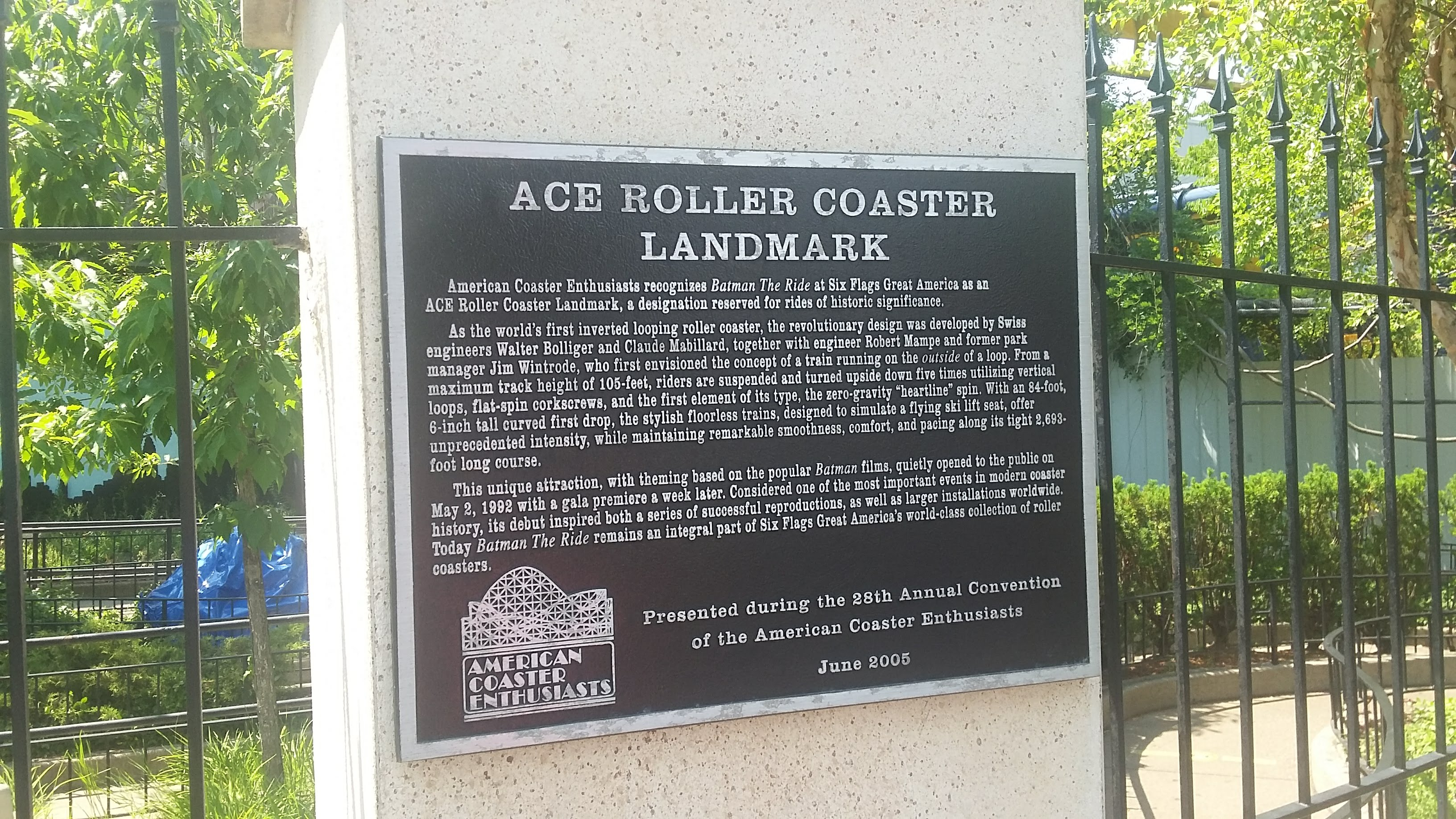
ACE Roller Coaster Landmark plaque for Batman: The Ride at Six Flags Great America

Batman: The Ride has generally received positive reviews. The Dallas Morning News stated the ride "is proof that new thrills on the cutting edge of technology generate excitement". They also praise the theme of the "smooth-riding coaster" stating "the mysterious crime-fighter is a proven crowd-pleaser". American Coaster Enthusiasts have also praised the ride, awarding it Coaster Landmark status in 2005. They describe the ride as a "revolutionary design" which offers "unprecedented intensity, while maintaining remarkable smoothness, comfort, and pacing". ACE erected a plaque outside the entrance to the ride at Six Flags Great America.

Ultimate Rollercoaster describes Batman: The Ride as "the ride of your life". They state "the sensation created by an inverted coaster is very different from that of traditional roller coasters. It is a sensation that every coaster fan must experience".

=== Awards ===
In Amusement Today's Golden Ticket Awards for Best Steel Roller Coasters, Batman: The Ride ranked in the late 1990s before dropping off the poll and returning once in 2005. The original installation at Six Flags Great America was ranked 23 and 25 in 1998 and 1999, before returning in 2005 at position 45. In 1998, the Six Flags Great Adventure and Mid America Adventure installations ranked 19 and 21, respectively.
