= Six Flags Hurricane Harbor San Antonio =

Water park in San Antonio, Texas

- Interactive map of Six Flags Hurricane Harbor San Antonio
- Location: Six Flags Fiesta Texas, San Antonio, Texas, United States
- Coordinates: 29°35′58″N 98°36′34″W
- Owner: Six Flags
- General manager: Robert Bustle
- Opened: 1992
- Previous names: Ol' Waterin' Hole (1992-1998); Armadillo Beach (1999-2005); White Water Bay (2005-2022)
- Operating season: May through September
- Website: www.sixflags.com/fiestatexas

Six Flags Hurricane Harbor San Antonio is a water park at Six Flags Fiesta Texas amusement park in San Antonio, Texas. Opened in 1992 as Ol' Waterin' Hole, the water park is included with the price of admission to Six Flags Fiesta Texas. It is owned and operated by Six Flags. It was originally named Ol' Waterin' Hole from 1992 to 1998 and Armadillo Beach from 1999 to 2005, and from 2005 to 2022, was named White Water Bay, before it was renamed to Six Flags Hurricane Harbor San Antonio.

== List of attractions ==
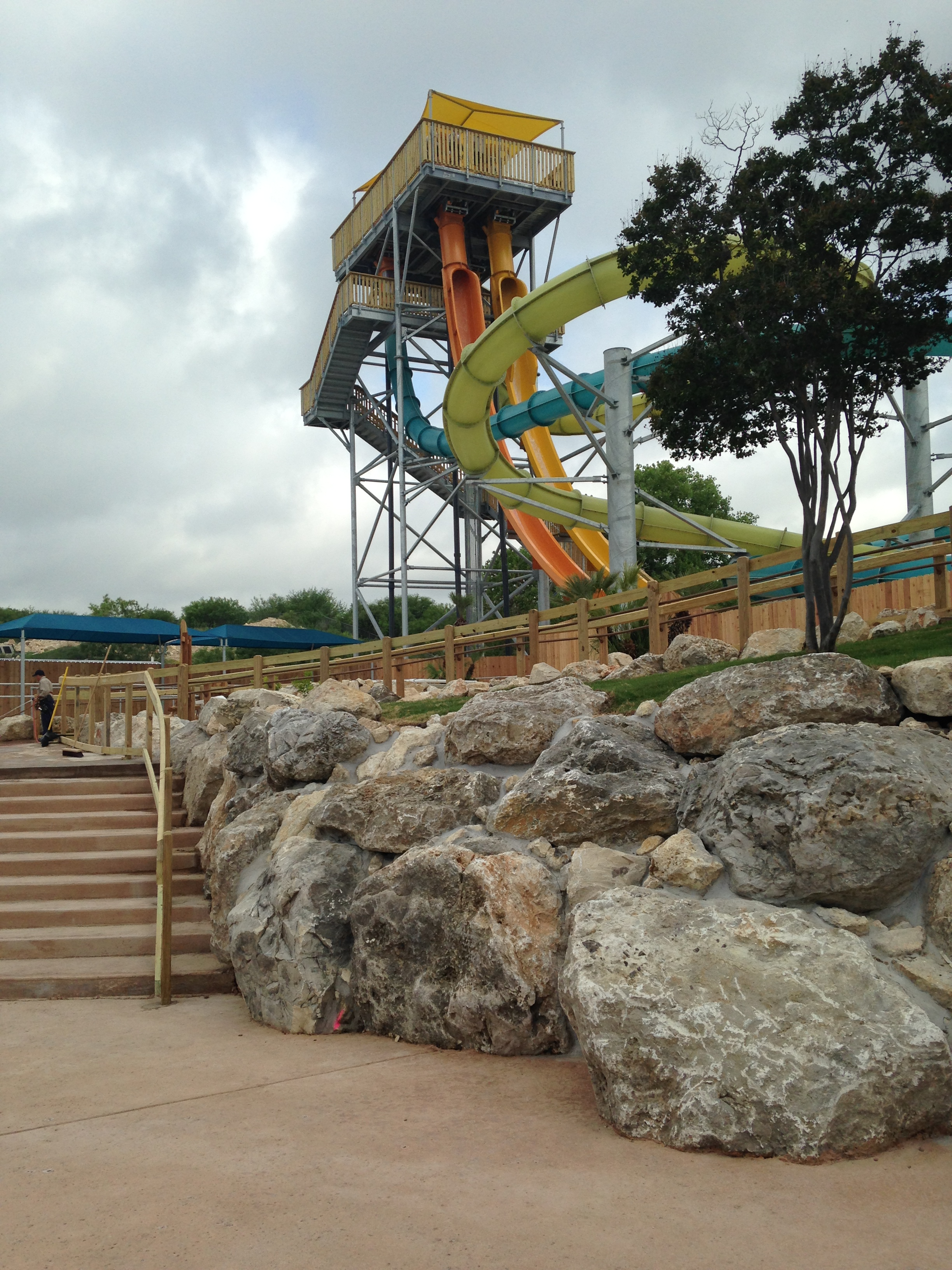
Bahama Blaster

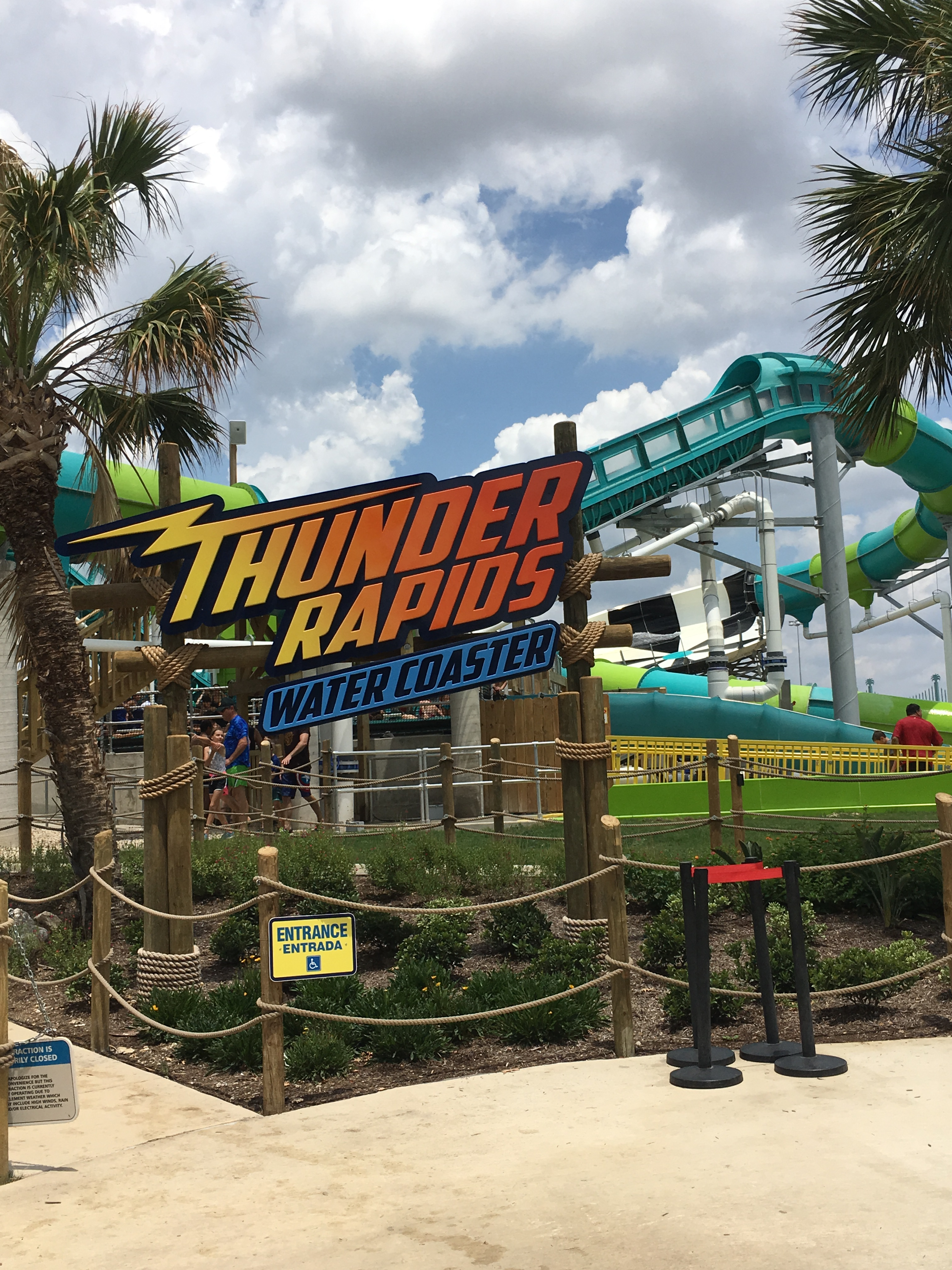
Thunder Rapids entrance

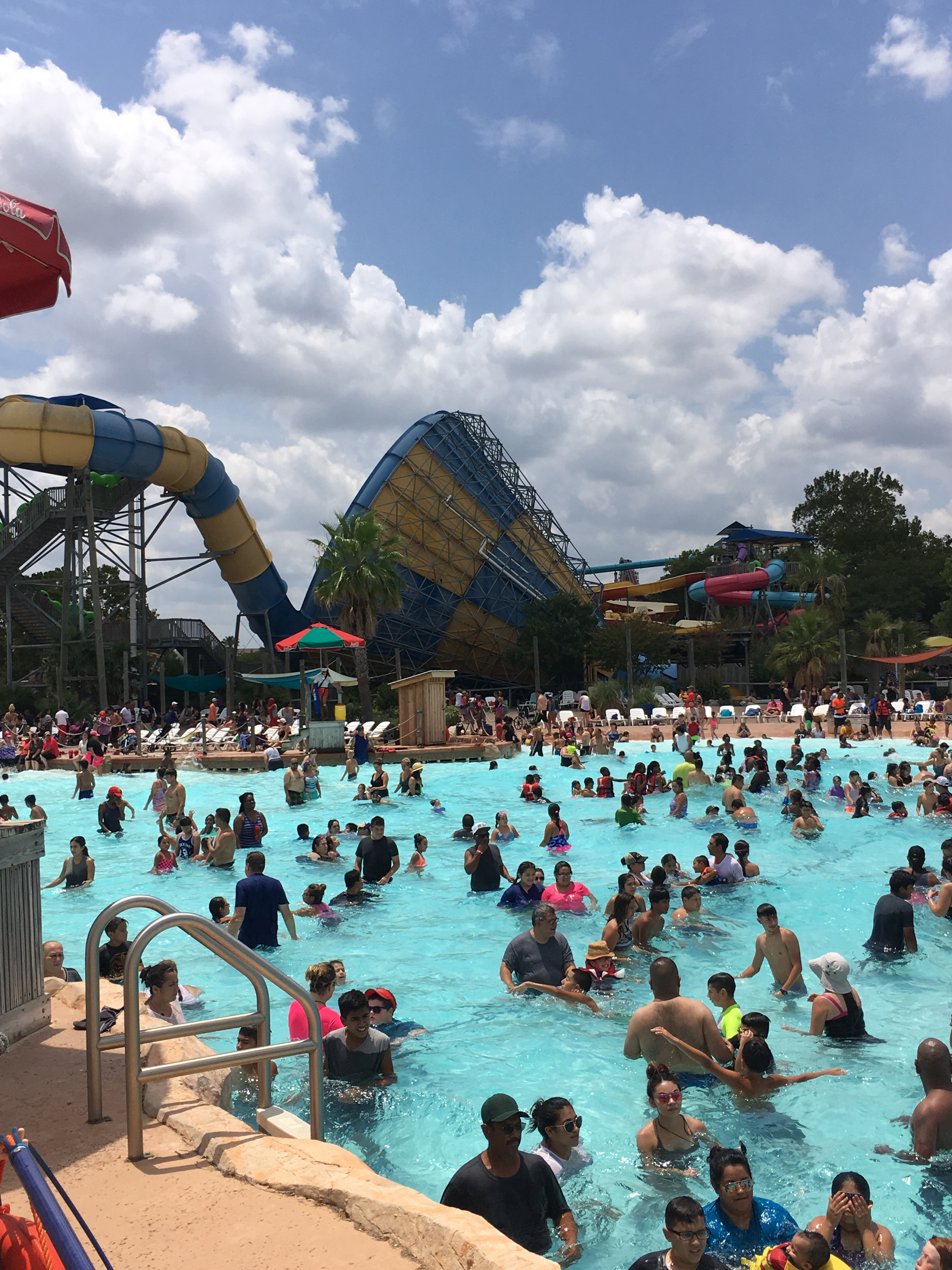
Lone Star Lagoon with Tornado in the background.

=== Current water park attractions ===
Name	Opened	Type	Notes
Texas Tumble	1992	Family raft ride	
White Water Canyon	1992	Lazy river	
Riptide Runner	1992	Open tube slide	
Bermuda Triangle	1992	Enclosed tube slide	
Texas Treehouse	1999	Family activity area	
Lone Star Lagoon	1999	Texas shaped wave pool	
Tornado	2004	ProSlide Technology Inc. Tornado "60"	
Bahama Blaster	2014	ProSlide Technology Inc.	A six-story four body slide complex. Two slides are “Plummets” and the other four are “Superloops” that all feature drop capsules.
Bamboo Chutes	2014	Kids area	
Thunder Rapids	2017	ProSlide Technology Inc. "Rocketblast" Water Coaster	A water coaster featuring 6 uphill blasts, 5 drops, and 4 saucer-shaped turns. Thunder Rapids won the 2017 Best New Water Park Ride in the Golden Ticket Awards.
Coral Cove	2024	Kids area/ProSlide Technology Inc.	Kids area featuring seven water slides.

=== Former water park attractions ===
Name	Opened	Removed	Type	Notes
Tadpole Pond	1996	1998	Kiddie pool	
Sandy Bottoms	1996	1998	Beach volleyball area	
The Gusher	1992	1999	Two open raft slides – wet/dry slides	
Pipeline	1992	1999	Two enclosed raft slides – wet/dry slides	
The Triple Dipper	1992	2002	Two body slides with three humps	
Splash Water Springs	1992	2005	Kiddie play area	
Ol’ Swimmin’ Hole	1996	2005	Family activity area	
Crackaxle Springs	1996	2005	“Adult” activity area	
Hill Country Racer	2006	2016	ProSlide Technology Inc. 6-lane “ProRacer”	Relocated from Six Flags Astroworld. The ride closed on September 11, 2016 to make room for Thunder Rapids.
Splash Water Springs	2006	2024	Kids Area	Replaced with the new area "Coral Cove"
Paradise Plunge	1992	2025	Body speed slide	
Typhoon Twister	1992	2025	Enclosed body slide	
Whirlpool	2006	2025	ProSlide Technology Inc. “Cannonbowl”	Removed on September 1, 2025
Big Bender	2006	2025	ProSlide Technology Inc. “Pipeline”	Removed on September 1, 2025
