= La Cantera, San Antonio =

Area of San Antonio, Texas, United States

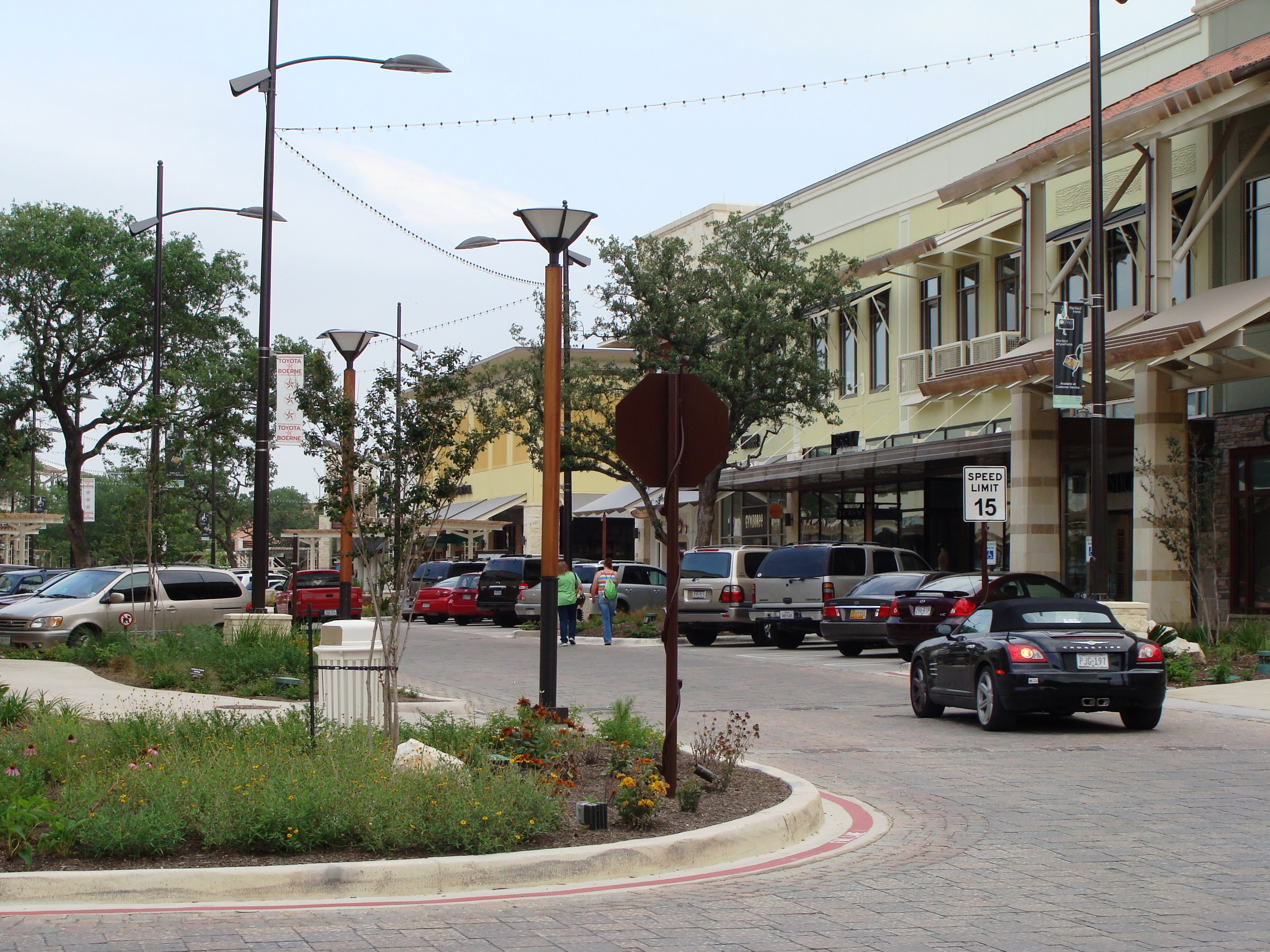
The Shops at La Cantera

La Cantera is a master-planned development and district of the City of San Antonio in the U.S. state of Texas, on the city's Northwest Side. "La Cantera" is Spanish for "the quarry", in reference to what the district was before USAA turned it to a 178-acre (0.72 km^{2}) mixed-use master-planned development.

La Cantera is located north of the University of Texas at San Antonio Main Campus and west of the Rim. It lies northwest of an interchange between IH-10 and Loop 1604.

La Cantera is home to Six Flags Fiesta Texas, the largest amusement park in South Texas, and a major shopping center, The Shops at La Cantera. The Shops are anchored by Neiman Marcus, Macy's, Dillard's, and Nordstrom. The Shops are located just south of Six Flags Fiesta Texas and next to the future site of Town Center at La Cantera.

La Cantera is still under development and its focal point, Town Center at La Cantera, is currently being constructed. The Town Center will be a mix of shops, residences, and offices, and it will also link The Shops at La Cantera with Six Flags Fiesta Texas.

A second retail center is being built in La Cantera, by a joint venture between USAA Real Estate and JLL called La Cantera Heights. It will be located directly to the right of Six Flags Fiesta Texas' entrance sign on La Cantera Parkway.

One of San Antonio's hike-and-bike trails, Leon Creek Greenway, goes through La Cantera but does not yet link to it. A bridge is being built to connect La Cantera to the greenway.

Security Service Federal Credit Union is based in La Cantera.
