= The Shops at La Cantera =

Shopping center in San Antonio, Texas, U.S.

Coordinates: 29°35′33″N 98°36′56″W

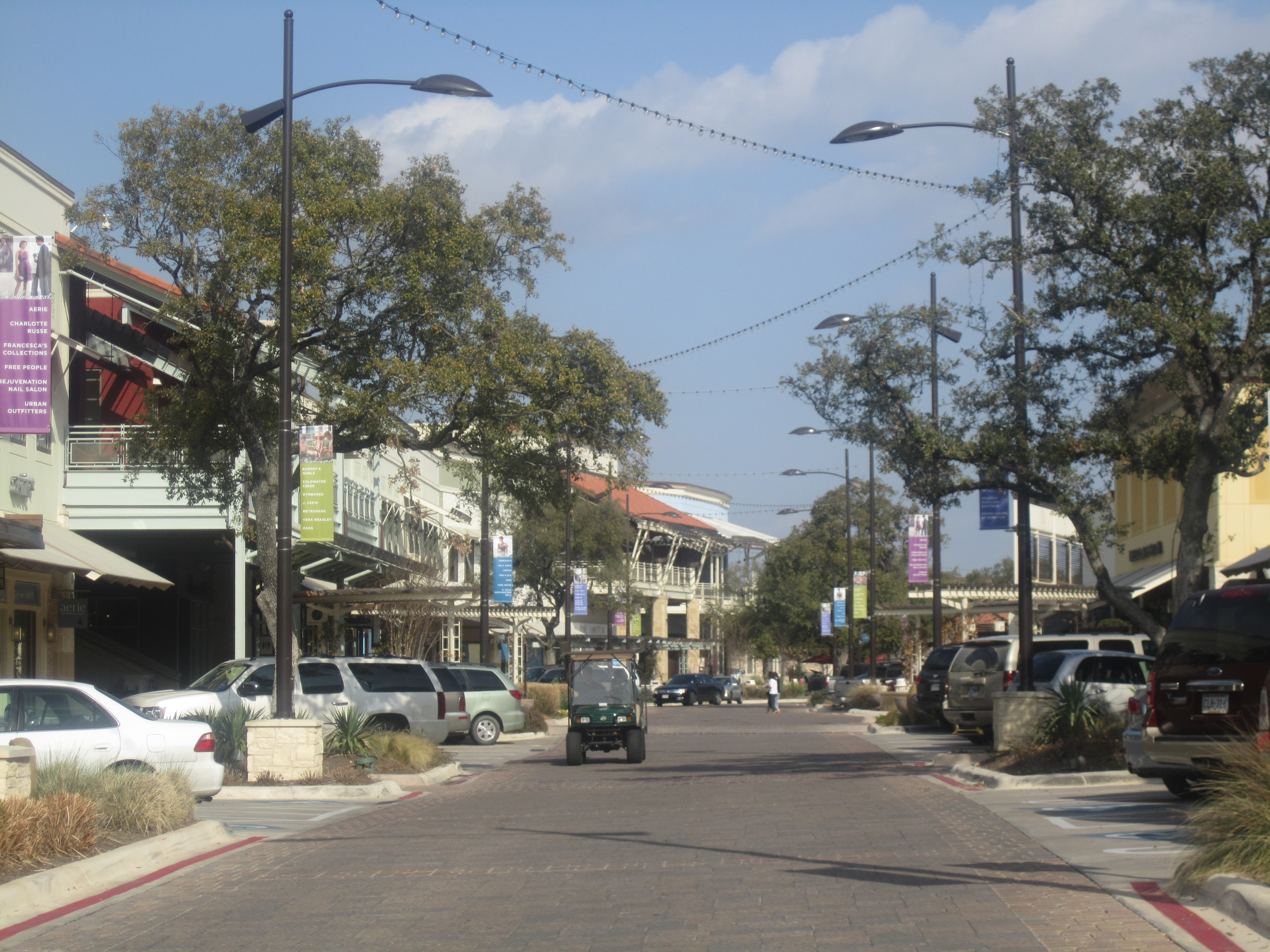
- Exterior view (February 2011)
- Location: La Cantera, San Antonio, Texas, U.S.
- Opened: September 16, 2005; 21 years ago (phase I); 2008; 18 years ago (phase II)
- Previous names: La Cantera Center
- Developer: The Rouse Company (phase I); General Growth Properties (phase II)
- Manager: GGP
- Owner: GGP
- Architect: Alamo Architects
- Num. of stores: 194
- Num. of anchor tenants: 6
- Floor area: 1,246,938 sq ft (115,844.3 m^{2})
- Floors: 2
- Website: theshopsatlacantera.com

The Shops at La Cantera, formerly La Cantera Center, is an open-air regional shopping mall located in La Cantera, San Antonio, near the Texas State Highway Loop 1604 and Interstate 10 interchange, on the city's Northwest Side. The initial phase of the project opened on September 16, 2005. The 1,300,000-square-foot (120,000 m^{2}) center sits on a 150-acre (0.61 km^{2}) site in La Cantera, a 1,700-acre (6.9 km^{2}) master-planned resort community developed by USAA Real Estate Company. The anchor stores are Neiman Marcus, Nordstrom, Dillard's, Macy's, Barnes & Noble, Crate & Barrel and H&M.

== History ==
=== Pre-construction and development ===
The concept for the center was originally developed and conceived by The Rouse Company under a joint venture with USAA Real Estate Company. General Growth Properties acquired The Rouse Company in November 2004, and finished construction of the mall's first phase.

For the development of La Cantera Center, The Rouse Company founded the subsidiary La Cantera Specialty Retail, LP.

Local architectural firm Alamo Architects designed The Shops at La Cantera, constructed as a single-level, garden-like "retail village" with varied storefronts, shared arcades, and subtle water features. The overall architectural style of the center has a Texas Hill Country vernacular vibe designed to ease environmental concerns about land usage and nature conservation. The shops reflect the preservation of natural landscape and evolution in modern shopping patterns. Austin-native J. Robert Anderson, FASLA conceived the landscape architecture style, that also reflects Hill Country.

The Shops at La Cantera includes the first Neiman Marcus and Nordstrom in San Antonio and new stores from Dillard's and Foley's (now Macy's). There are also more than 150 other shops and restaurants.

=== After opening ===
Following GGP's acquisition of Rouse in 2004, the second phase of the mall was opened in October 2008 and had 300,000 new square feet of retail space and contained an additional 40 stores (about 30 of which are new to the market), restaurants, a Barnes & Noble bookstore and office space. Like the original mall, the second phase was designed by Alamo Architects.

In 2018, Brookfield Properties acquired GGP and its assets, including The Shops at La Cantera.

On September 1, 2023, a second LEGO store in San Antonio opened at The Shops at La Cantera.

In January 2026, Brookfield Properties rebranded its retail division back to GGP.

Urban Outfitters closed permanently in January 2026.

== Awards ==
- Superior Achievement in Design & Imaging (SADI) 2006 Grand Award Winner
