= Werewolf Gorge =

Upcoming launched roller coaster at Six Flags Fiesta Texas

Coordinates: 29°35′57″N 98°36′44″W

Six Flags Fiesta Texas
- Location: Six Flags Fiesta Texas
- Park section: Crackaxle Canyon Steampunk District
- Status: Under construction
- Opening date: 2027
- Replaced: Big Bender and Whirlpool

General statistics
- Type: Steel
- Manufacturer: Vekoma
- Drop: 40 ft (12 m)
- Length: 4,120 ft (1,260 m)
- Speed: 45 mph (72 km/h)
- Inversions: 0
- Duration: 2:36
- Werewolf Gorge at RCDB

Werewolf Gorge is an upcoming steel family roller coaster opening in 2027 at Six Flags Fiesta Texas in San Antonio, Texas, United States. Billed as becoming the longest family launched roller coaster in the world when it opens, it will feature 4,120 feet (1,260 m) of track and a ride duration of two minutes thirty-six seconds. Its four launches will accelerate riders to a top speed of 45 miles per hour (72 km/h), and its layout will contain multiple airtime moments and drops up to 40 feet (12 m) in height. It will be located in the Crackaxle Canyon Screampunk District area of the park and themed to werewolves with multiple thematic elements.

== History ==
In early 2026, Six Flags Fiesta Texas began a teaser campaign for a new attraction set to debut in 2027. This included social media posts as well as a billboard in the Crackaxle Canyon Screampunk District area of the park. The billboard featured a phone number, which, when called, provided information about the addition's backstory and mentioned its 130,000-square-foot (12,000 m^{2}) footprint. In October 2025, Six Flags Fiesta Texas began the demolition of the Big Bender and Whirlpool water slides to clear space for future park expansions.

The park announced Werewolf Gorge on May 30, 2026, during an event scheduled to coincide with the rising of a blue moon, linking to the ride's theme. It was announced that Vekoma will construct a family-friendly roller coaster scheduled to open in 2027. The park revealed the ride's layout, The attraction was billed as the world's longest family launched roller coaster with 4,120 feet (1,260 m) of track; additionally, the park advertised that riders will experience the most moments airtime on any family roller coaster in the world at 32.

== Characteristics ==
=== Backstory and queue ===
Werewolf Gorge is themed to an abandoned Texas quarry that has been turned into a tourist attraction by an entrepreneur character. According to the story, the mine is tied to a werewolf curse leading to reports of werewolf sightings and missing miners before the mine was abandoned.

Werewolf Gorge will be in the Crackaxle Canyon Screampunk District area of the park. The queue will be themed to this roadside attraction and feature sections such as the "Museum of Cryptids" and "Werewolf Museum" which riders will walk through.

=== Ride experience ===
Werewolf Gorge will feature four linear induction motor launches to reach a top speed of 45 miles per hour (72 km/h), including a multi-pass launch following a backward element of the ride. The ride's 4,120-foot long (1,260 m) track will provide riders 32 moments of floater airtime during the two-minute thirty-six-second ride. Riders will experience a 40-foot-tall (12 m) drop and a 85-foot (26 m) total elevation change during the ride. The ride will be set in an environment with quarry walls and pine trees. Part of the ride will be themed to an escape from the quarry's werewolf curse, featuring themed elements including werewolf figures and a crumbling quarry scene to end the ride.
