= Chupacabra (roller coaster) =

Steel inverted roller coaster

- Previously known as Gambit at Thrill Valley (1995–2002); Batman: The Ride at Six Flags New Orleans (2003–2005); Goliath at Six Flags Fiesta Texas (2008–2024)
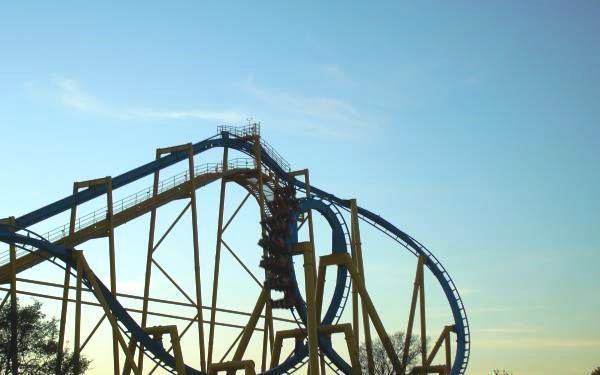

Six Flags Fiesta Texas
- Park section: Los Festivales
- Coordinates: 29.59889°N 98.60778°W
- Status: Operating
- Opening date: April 18, 2008

Six Flags New Orleans
- Park section: DC Comics Super Hero Adventures
- Coordinates: 30°02′59″N 89°56′05.1″W
- Status: Removed
- Opening date: April 12, 2003
- Closing date: August 21, 2005

Thrill Valley
- Coordinates: 35°18′23.6″N 138°58′04.5″E
- Status: Removed
- Opening date: 1995
- Closing date: May 6, 2002

General statistics
- Type: Steel – Inverted
- Manufacturer: Bolliger & Mabillard
- Designer: Werner Stengel
- Model: Inverted Coaster - Batman
- Lift/launch system: Chain lift hill
- Height: 105 ft (32 m)
- Drop: 80 ft (24 m)
- Length: 2,693 ft (821 m)
- Speed: 50 mph (80 km/h)
- Inversions: 5
- Duration: 2:00
- Capacity: 1400 riders per hour
- G-force: 4
- Height restriction: 54 in (137 cm)
- Trains: 2 trains with 7 cars. Riders are arranged 4 across in a single row for a total of 28 riders per train.
- Fast Lane available
- Chupacabra at RCDB

Chupacabra is an inverted roller coaster at Six Flags Fiesta Texas in San Antonio, Texas, United States. Designed by Werner Stengel and Swiss manufacturer Bolliger & Mabillard, Chupacabra initially opened in Japan in 1995 at Odakyu Gotemba Family Land, later known as Thrill Valley. In 2002, it was moved to Six Flags New Orleans where it reopened as Batman: The Ride the following year, operating until Hurricane Katrina led to the park's abandonment in 2005. The ride was moved once more to Six Flags Fiesta Texas, reopening in 2008 as Goliath. In 2024, the park announced that the roller coaster would be renamed to Chupacabra.

The ride stands at a height of 105 feet (32 m), reaches a maximum speed of 50 mph (80 km/h), and features 5 inversions along its 2,693-foot-long (821 m) layout. The coaster is a mirror image of Batman: The Ride at Six Flags Great America. It is named after a Chupacabra, a legandary creature in folklore of parts of the Americas.

== History ==
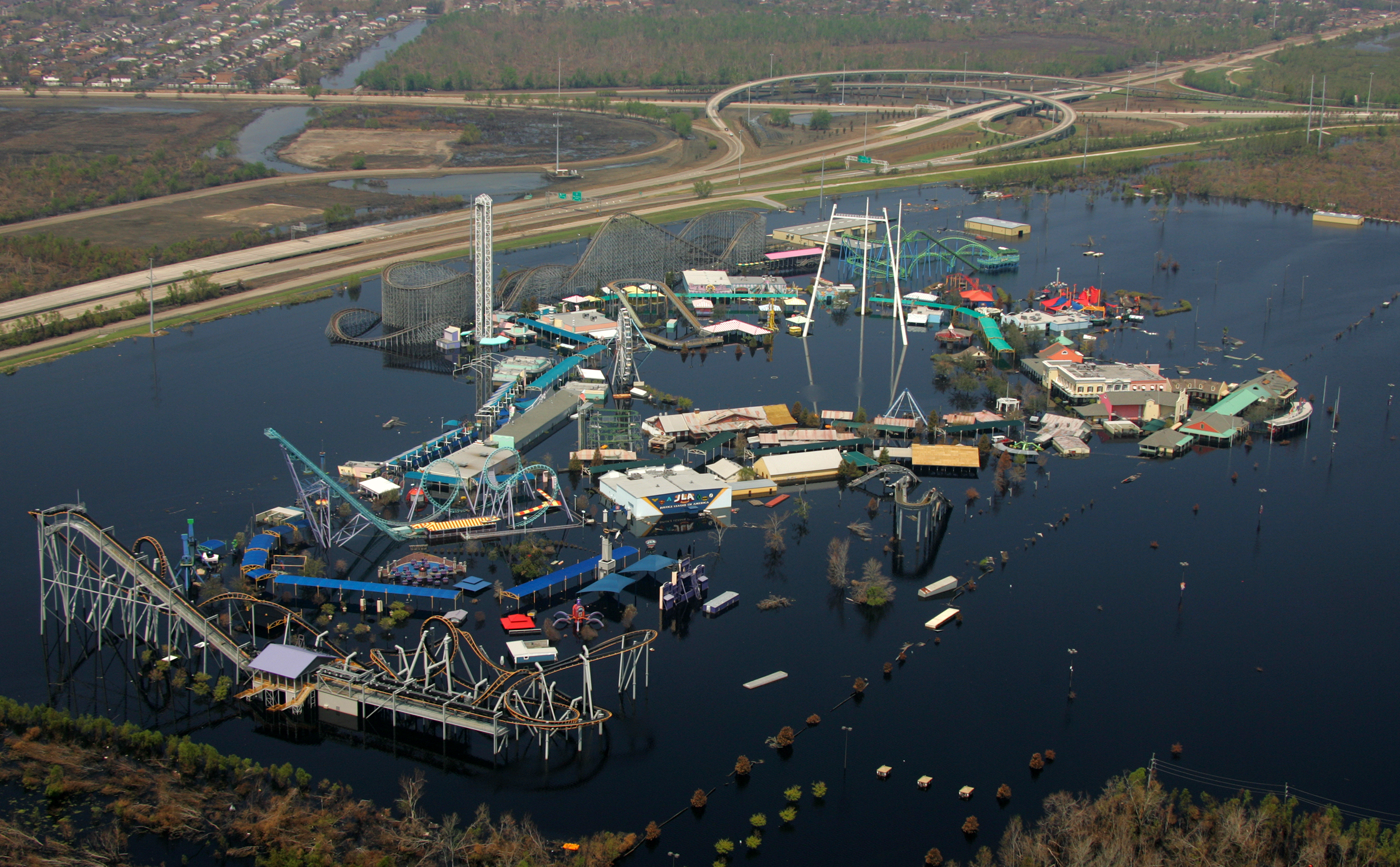
Chupacabra (known as Batman: The Ride at that time) (bottom left) in a still flooded Six Flags New Orleans two weeks after Hurricane Katrina.

Chupacabra originally opened in 1995 as Gambit at Odakyu Gotemba Family Land, a former amusement park in Japan that was later known as Thrill Valley. When Thrill Valley closed on May 6, 2002, Six Flags purchased several of its rides, including Gambit, and transported them to various Six Flags parks. Gambit went to one of their newly acquired theme parks, Six Flags New Orleans. It was repainted and renamed Batman: The Ride in accordance with the park chain's use of DC Comics theming and reopened on April 12, 2003.

After Hurricane Katrina made landfall over New Orleans in 2005, the park's drainage system failed, leading to substantial flooding that submerged many of the park's rides in water. Batman: The Ride was not majorly damaged primarily due to its high elevation above sea level and corrosion-resistant support structure. When flooding retreated, Six Flags New Orleans was permanently closed, and any rides that could be salvaged were moved to other parts of the country. Batman: The Ride was moved to Six Flags Fiesta Texas in San Antonio to be refurbished and repainted. The coaster reopened on April 18, 2008 as Goliath. In December 2024, Six Flags Fiesta Texas announced that the ride would be renamed to Chupacabra based on the legendary creature of the same name folklore of parts of the Americas.

== Ride experience ==
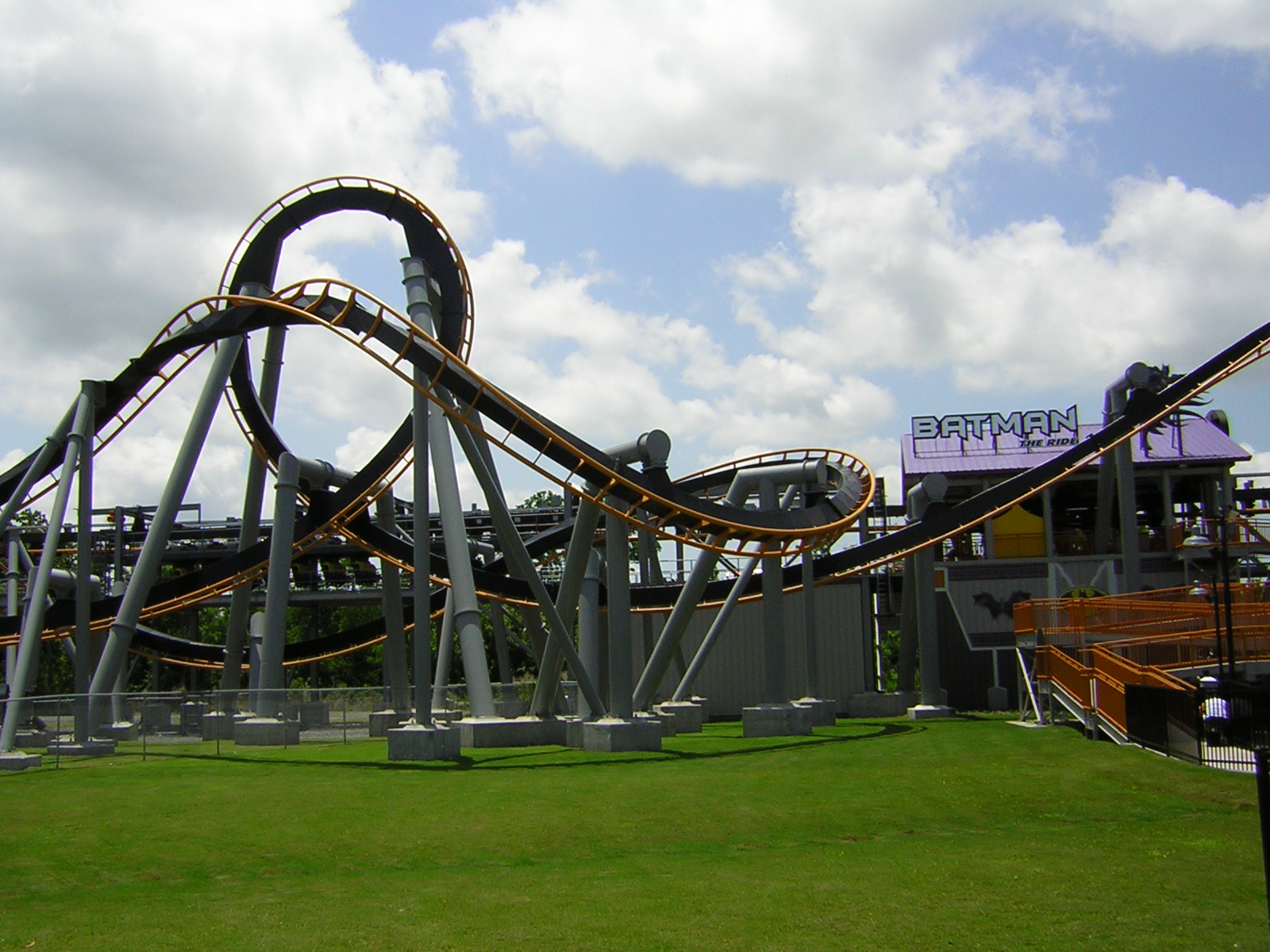
Chupacabra when it was known as Batman: The Ride at Six Flags New Orleans.

After departing from the station, the train immediately climbs the 105-foot (32 m) chain lift hill. At the top, the train makes a sharp 80-foot (24 m) downward right turn into the roller coaster's first element, a vertical loop, reaching a top speed of approximately 50 mph (80 km/h). After exiting the loop, the train enters a zero-g roll inversion before entering a second vertical loop. This is followed by an upward right-handed helix and a downward left turn into a series of corkscrews separate by a sharp left turn. The train then veers right into a brake run and returns to the station. One cycle of the ride lasts approximately two minutes.

=== Track ===
Chupacabra has a track length of 2,693 feet (821 m) and climbs to a height of 105 feet (32 m). As Gambit at Thrill Valley, the ride featured a painted black spine and black crossties, unpainted rails and gray supports. When it was known as Batman: The Ride in New Orleans, the track was painted black and orange with gray supports. At Six Flags Fiesta Texas, the ride's color scheme a blue track with yellow supports from 2008 to Fall 2024; the track was then repainted orange while the supports remained yellow. Friction brakes are used to control the speed of the train. The track was manufactured by Clermont Steel Fabricators in Batavia, Ohio.

Chupacabra is a mirror image of Batman: The Ride at Six Flags Great America. After a successful launch in 1992, the ride was cloned to multiple other parks. It is not the only Batman model to be found in San Antonio; SeaWorld introduced The Great White first in 1997.

=== Trains ===
Chupacabra operates two steel and fiberglass trains with seven cars each. Each car seats four riders in a single row for a total of 28 riders per train. The supports for the seats are orange, the seats themselves are black with yellow over-the-shoulder restraints connected to each one, and the coverings for the wheels are orange, blue, and yellow.
