= Six Flags Fiesta Texas =

Amusement park in San Antonio, Texas

- Previously known as Fiesta Texas (1992–1995)
- Logo used since 2025

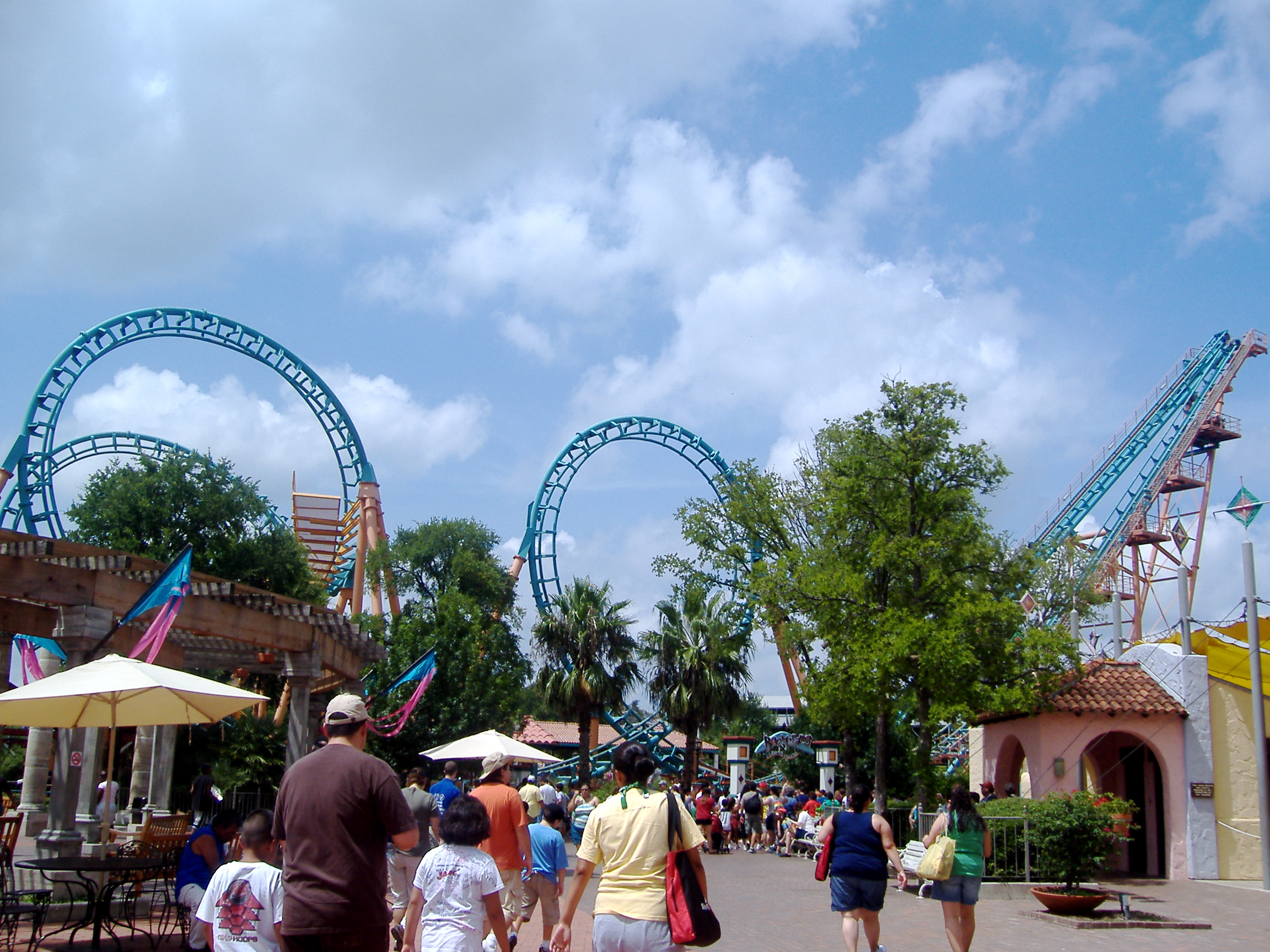
- Boomerang, the visual centerpiece of the park.
- Interactive map of Six Flags Fiesta Texas
- Location: La Cantera, San Antonio, Texas, United States
- Coordinates: 29.5995°N 98.6094°W
- Status: Operating
- Opened: March 14, 1992; 34 years ago
- Owner: Six Flags
- General manager: Robert Bustle
- Slogan: The Thrill Capital of South Texas
- Operating season: Year-round
- Area: 220 acres (0.89 km^{2})

Attractions
- Total: 40
- Roller coasters: 11
- Water rides: 2
- Website: sixflags.com/fiestatexas

Six Flags Fiesta Texas is an amusement park in San Antonio, Texas, United States. It opened on March 14, 1992, in the La Cantera master-planned development and district as the first business in that development. Spanning 200 acres (81 ha), the park was originally built to become a destination musical show park with its focus on the musical culture of the state of Texas. The park was purchased by Time Warner (currently known as Warner Bros. Discovery) in 1995, and branded as a Six Flags park for the 1996 season.

The park's landmark is the Scream drop tower ride which stands 205 feet tall and can be seen from all around the park as well as outside the property. The vibrant colors of the ride along with the Fiesta Texas signage make it visible to guests approaching from the intersection of Loop 1604 and Interstate 10. A good portion of the park is hidden within the quarry, however, several other attractions, including portions of most of the park's roller coasters are visible from outside the park.

== History ==
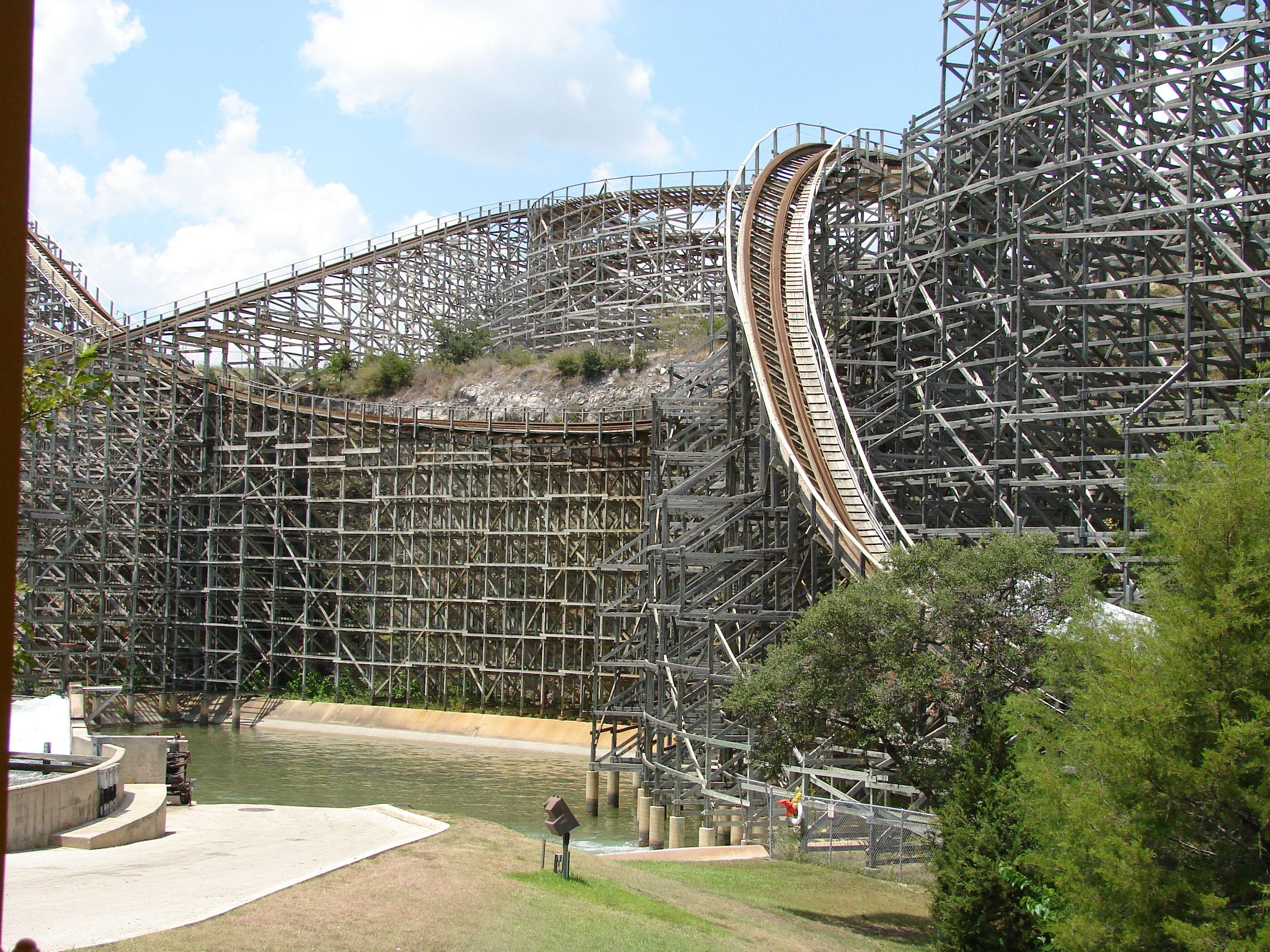
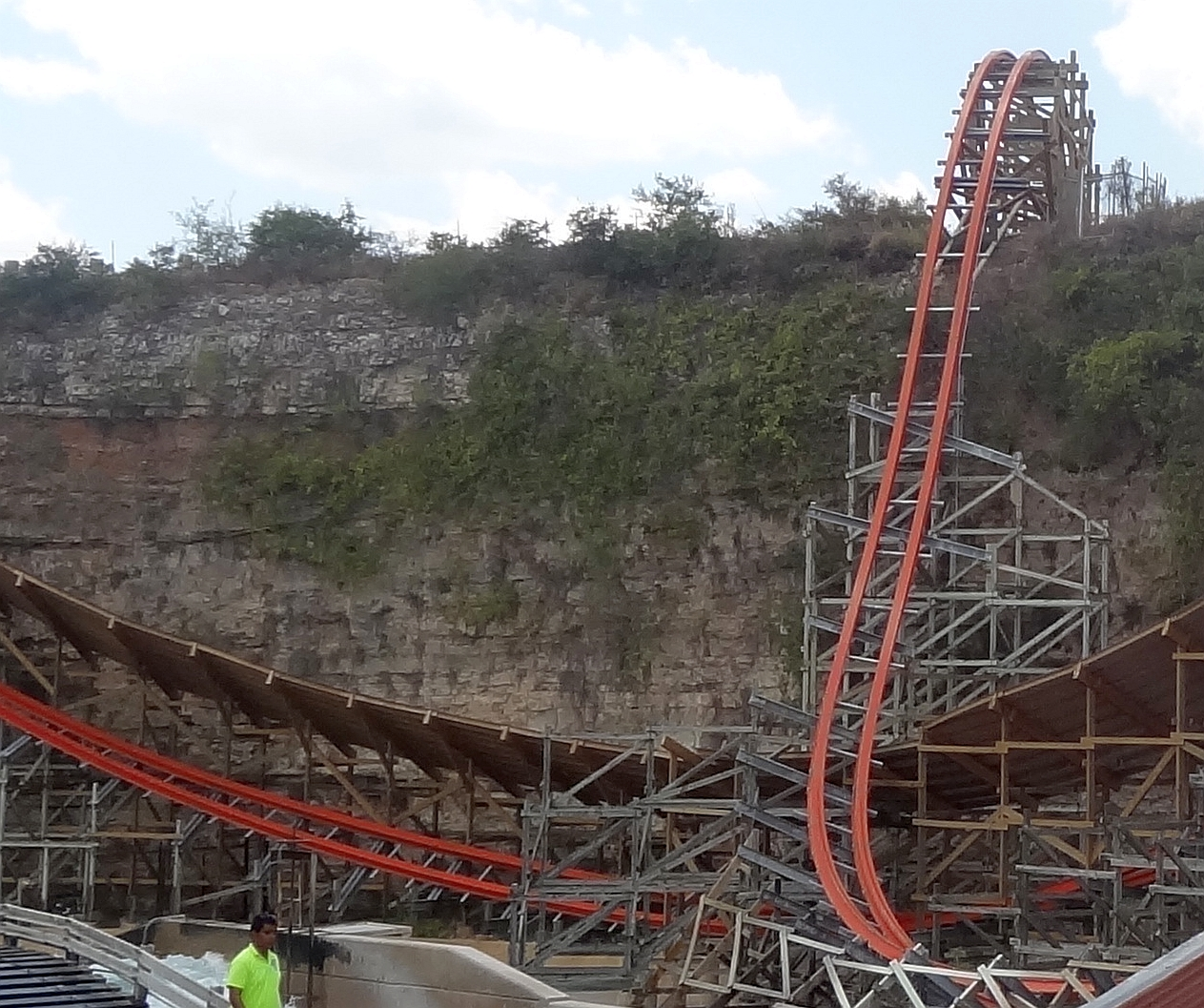
Iron Rattler before and after its conversion in 2013, showcasing the profile of the first drop before 2013 and after. The renovated ride features a steeper and longer first drop. It also features steel (I-Box) track with wooden supports (hybrid).

Before Fiesta Texas opened in 1992, the site was part of the Redland Quarry which began operation in 1934. By 1988, the limestone in the portion where Six Flags Fiesta Texas is located was depleted and the land was available for development.

The development team consisted of property owner USAA Real Estate Company, a subsidiary of the USAA insurance company and Gaylord Entertainment Company, a company that owned Opryland USA, a theme park in Nashville, Tennessee. When the initial ownership group began investigating a possible major theme park development in San Antonio, Texas, they faced significant competition in the Texas market. There were similarly established Six Flags parks in Arlington and Houston. Based on the competition, the development team believed the opportunity in San Antonio (an established regional leisure destination) was there and that the stable, slow growth direction of the theme park industry in the U.S. was in their favor.

The concept plan and master plan were developed by FORREC International based in Toronto. FORREC handed over a detailed design of the project to San Antonio-based architecture and engineering groups: Benham/Jones Kell and Pape Dawson. Actual construction of the theme park took approximately 23 months, running from early 1990 to the park's opening in March 1992. Construction of the theme park was overseen by a joint venture of two general contractors, Lyda Inc. of San Antonio and Manhattan Construction Company of Tulsa, Oklahoma. The park had four theme sections; Crackaxle Canyon, Los Festivales, Spassburg and Rockville, along with a water park called, Ol' Waterin' Hole. In its third season, 1994, Fiesta Texas added a new themed area, Fiesta Bay Boardwalk, with multiple new rides and attractions including a Ferris wheel, swinging ship, scrambler, and a roller-skating pavilion.

Time Warner took over management and operations of Fiesta Texas in 1996 and added the Six Flags name to the park, while USAA remained as the sole owner. Six Flags Fiesta Texas added its third roller coaster, a Vekoma Hurricane named The Joker's Revenge, which opened to the general public on May 10 of the same year. It was the park's first roller coaster to go upside down and the first ride to be based on DC Comics. The Joker's Revenge featured a funhouse queue line and trains that traveled backward through the course.

Premier Parks, which acquired the Six Flags theme park chain from Time Warner, purchased Fiesta Texas from USAA in October 1998. In 1999, Fiesta Texas saw the biggest expansion ever in park history with more than 10 new rides and water rides, as well a rename of the water park to Armadillo Beach. With the infusion of new rides, the park saw its annual attendance increase by more than one million visitors. Also in 1999, Six Flags Fiesta Texas was awarded Amusement Today's Golden Ticket Award for Best Shows in the theme park industry. The park continued to receive the award every year until 2008.

In March 2006, Six Flags Fiesta Texas expanded its water park and renamed it White Water Bay. The rehab included a redesigned plaza, new food and merchandise facilities and four new waterslide attractions.

The Six Flags company began the process of removing licensed theming company wide across its theme parks from attractions that the park had built in previous years. Six Flags Fiesta Texas had to rename and retheme seven rides as well as the kids theme area from Wiggles World to Kidzopolis, all in time for the 2011 season.

In 2019, the park for the first time in its history, operated at a year-round schedule. Before 2019, Fiesta Texas ran their operating seasons from March to the end of the year. In 2019, the park opened up a new theme area, DC Universe, which included most of the already established DC Comics themed rides, along with the brand new, Joker Carnival of Chaos.

A day before the park's 28th anniversary (March 13, 2020), Six Flags suspended all operations across all its properties due to concerns of the COVID-19 pandemic. During the time of closure, the park donated its food and supplies to a local hospital and food bank. On June 4, Six Flags announced the park would reopen on June 19 to members and season pass holders, and to the general public on June 22.

On July 28, 2021, plans were announced for the park's 30th-anniversary celebration in 2022 which will begin with a New Year's Eve Kickoff Event. Plans include a retheme of the popular Poltergeist roller coaster, a Celebrate 30 Night Show, food festivals, displays, a mini-museum, and a new B&M Dive Coaster, Dr. Diabolical's Cliffhanger. The latter ride officially opened on July 30, 2022. On May 30, 2026, during an event (called FT92 Fan Event) scheduled to coincide with the rising of a blue moon, linking to the ride's theme, it was announced that Vekoma will construct a family-friendly roller coaster, Werewolf Gorge, scheduled to open in 2027. The park revealed the ride's layout. The attraction was billed as the world's longest family launched roller coaster with 4,120 feet (1,260 m) of track; additionally, the park advertised that riders will experience the most airtime on any family roller coaster in the world with 32 airtime moments.

== Areas ==
Six Flags Fiesta Texas is currently divided into six themed areas along with an adjacent water park, Six Flags Hurricane Harbor

=== Los Festivales ===
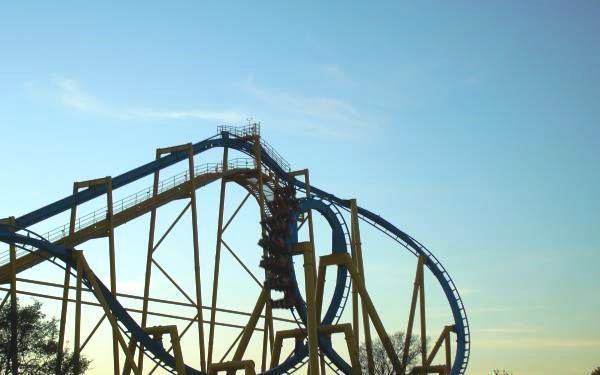
Chupacabra located in Los Festivales

Los Festivales is a Spanish-themed area that guests first encounter upon entering Six Flags Fiesta Texas. It was one of the original themed sections when the park opened in 1992 and is dedicated to the rich Hispanic culture that is integral to San Antonio.

Among the first things upon entering Los Festivales from the front gate is Chupacabra, a Bolliger & Mabillard inverted roller coaster, which dominates the visible skyline. The area also features Boomerang: Coast to Coaster, a Vekoma Boomerang which is seen as the "centerpiece" of the area. Los Festivales is home to two theater venues, the Teatro Fiesta and the Zaragoza Theatre.

The Zaragoza Theatre is known for the park's most popular shows during the summer months, as well as a special Halloween show during the park's annual Fright Fest event and The Majesty of Christmas during Holiday in the Park. Los Festivales is also the location of the eSix gaming arena.

=== Crackaxle Canyon Steampunk District ===
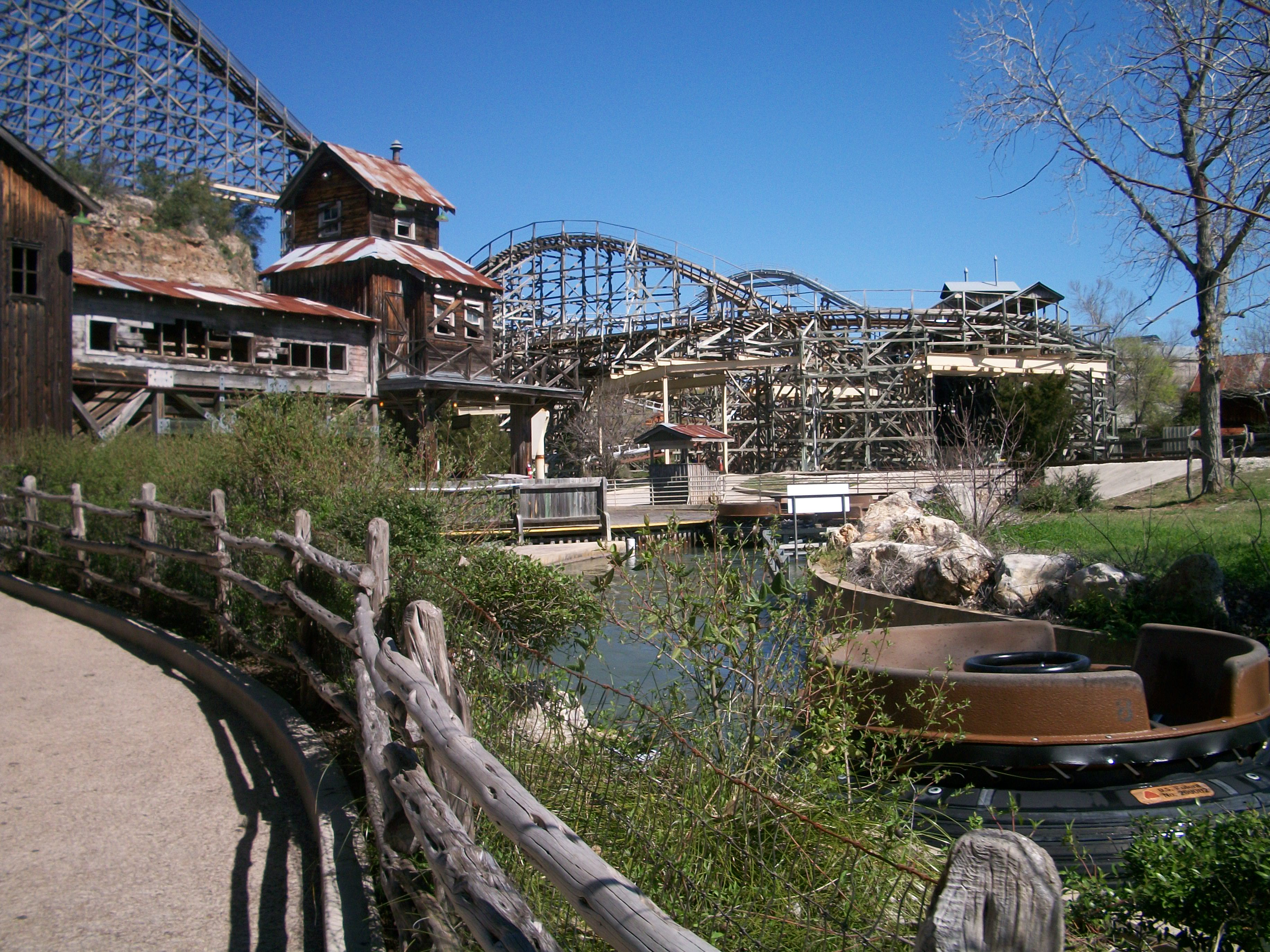
The Gully Washer located in Crackaxle Canyon

Crackaxle Canyon is themed after a 1920s Texan boomtown. It can be entered from neighboring areas Los Festivales and Spassburg. The area is home to Iron Rattler, the tallest roller coaster in the park and the first Rocky Mountain Construction roller coaster to have an inversion, as well as six other attractions such as Road Runner Express, an Arrow Dynamics Mine Train; Dr. Diabolical’s Cliffhanger, a Bolliger & Mabillard Dive coaster; and The Gully Washer, an Intamin river rapids water ride. Werewolf Gorge, a Vekoma Family Launch Coaster, is under construction, planned to open in the area in 2027.

The area also includes the Whistle Stop train station for the Fiesta Texas Railroad and Dare Devil Dive Flying Machines, a 48-foot-tall Super Air Race ride by Zamperla.

Crackaxle Canyon is home to Lone Star Lil's Amphitheater. The outdoor venue is known for Mayor Slayer's Monster Mash Bash, a show during Fright Fest, and a host site to watch the end-of-the-day fireworks during the summer months.

Crackaxle Canyon features several eateries: Bubba's River Cafe and Old Blue's BBQ, which offer indoor and outdoor seating; Thirsty Buffalo Saloon, which serves food and alcoholic beverages indoors; and Chop Six, which serves Asian cuisine. There are also several snack and beverage stands.

=== DC Universe ===
The newest area in the park. The star attraction is Superman Krypton Coaster a 168-foot (51 m) tall Floorless Coaster themed to the DC Comics superhero Superman. This area also includes The Joker Carnival of Chaos, a 172-foot-tall pendulum ride by Zamperla. This DC universe expansion replaced the old Kidzopolis kids' area, which also included the Funtime Star Flyer, Supergirl Sky Flight.

=== Spassburg ===
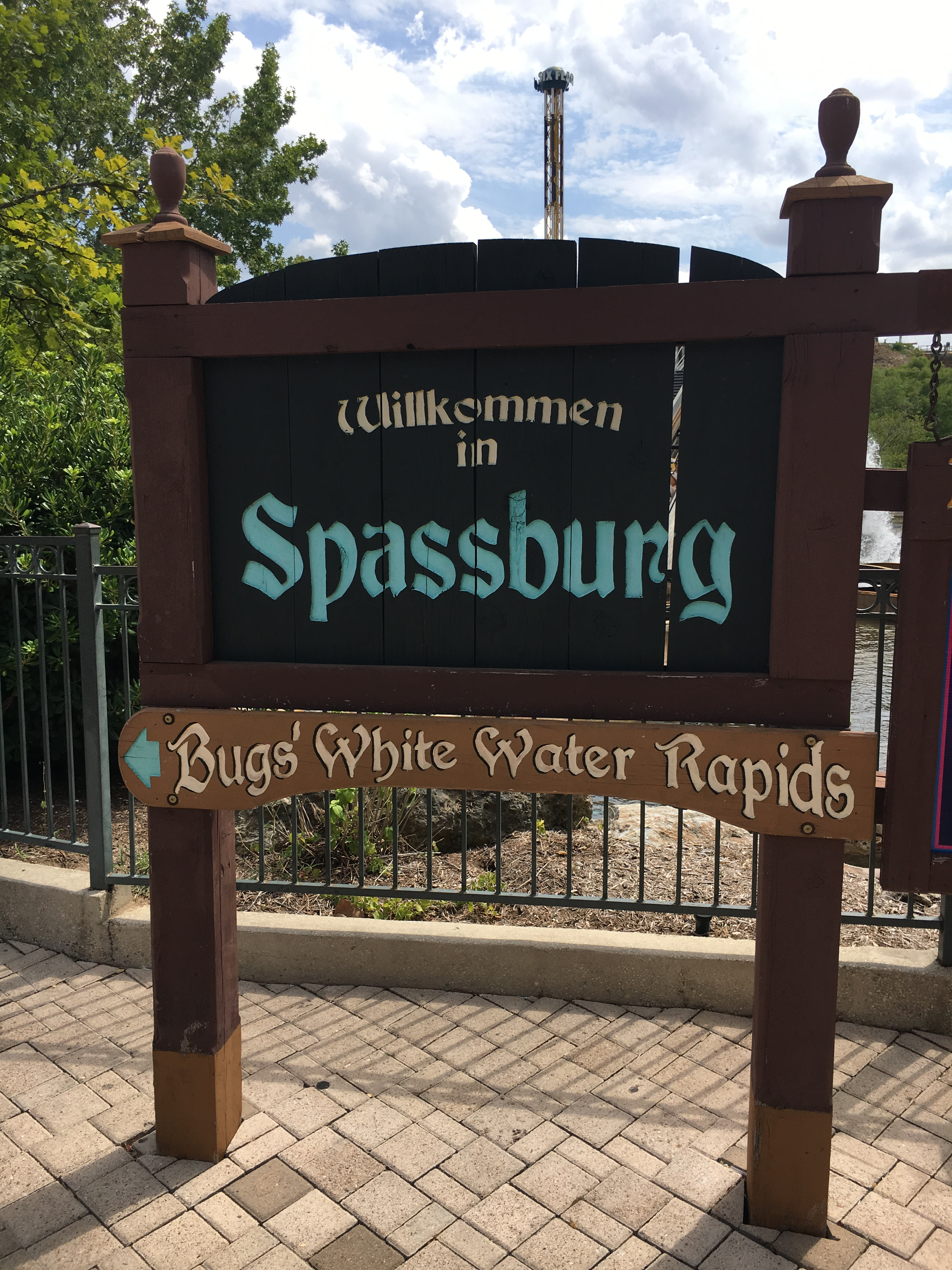
A welcome sign to Spassburg

Spassburg is themed after a German village and is dedicated to German heritage in Texas.

The village is home to Bugs' White Water Rapids, a Hopkins Rides log flume. Spassburg is also home to two theater venues, Sangerfest Halle and a character encounter building.

Sangerfest Halle is home to many shows throughout the year as well as a food court offering a wide range of food.

=== Rockville ===
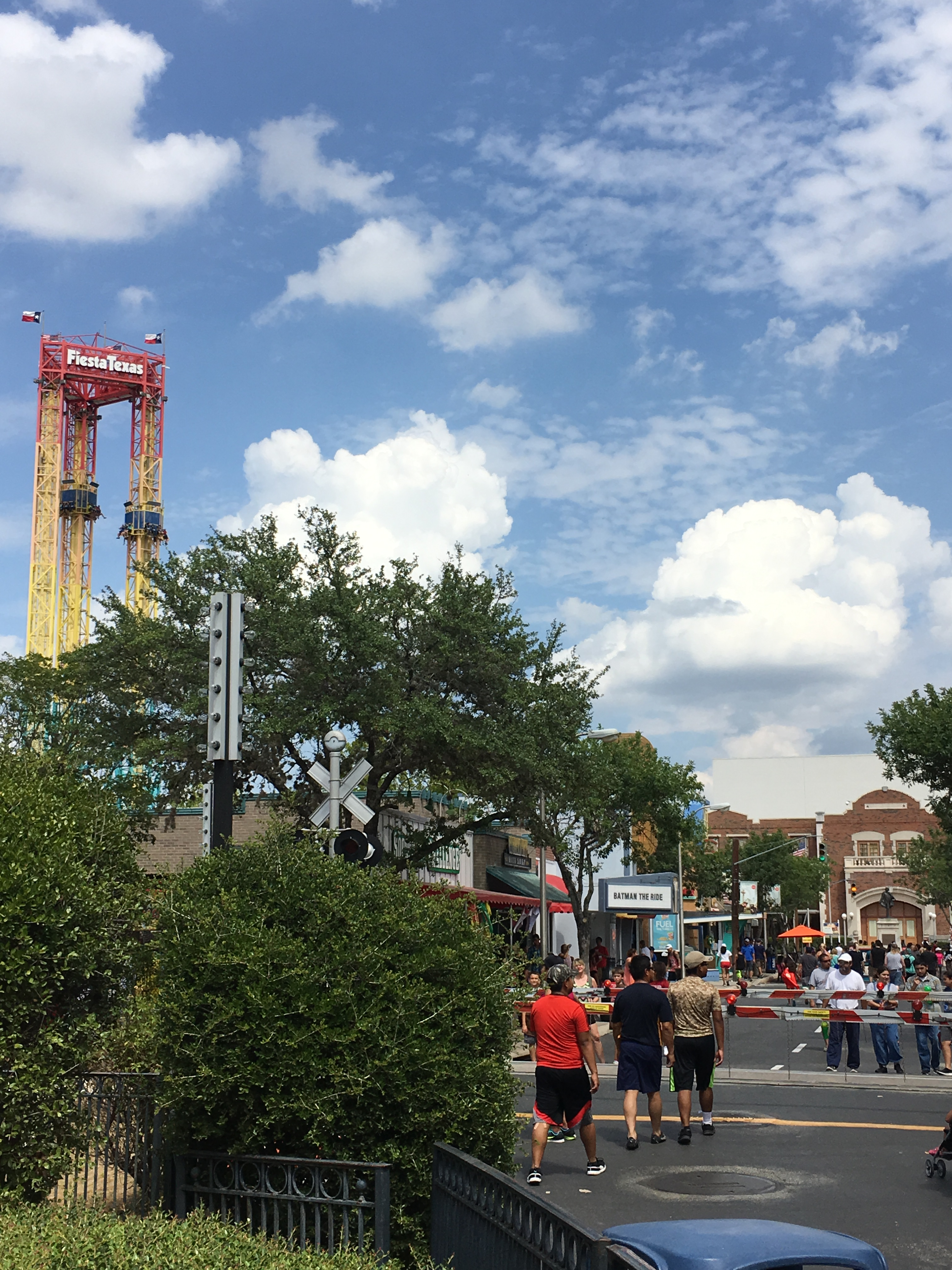
Looking towards Rockville

Rockville is a fictional town themed to the 1950s. Rockville can be entered from Spassburg with a railroad crossing at both of the entrances. The area is home to Batman: The Ride, the world's first S&S Sansei 4D Free Spin roller coaster as well as eight other attractions such as Poltergeist, a Premier Rides launch coaster, Wonder Woman Golden Lasso Coaster, the world's first Rocky Mountain Construction single-rail roller coaster, and Scream, a trio of S&S Sansei drop towers. Rockville is home to Rockville High, an indoor theater that is themed to a high school. The area has two sit-down restaurants that cater to the area — Pete's Eats and Primo's Pizzeria.

=== Fiesta Bay Boardwalk ===
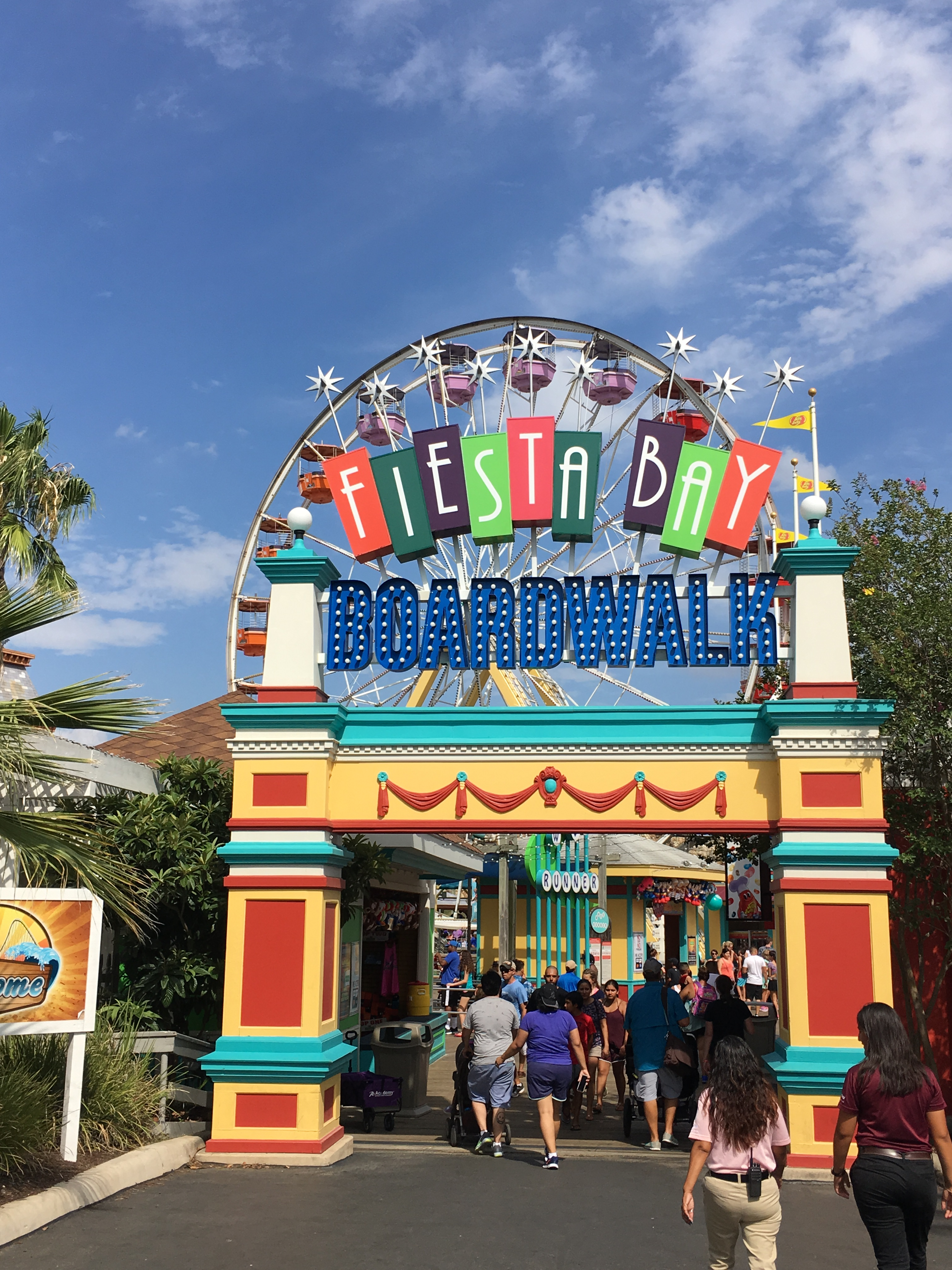
Fiesta Bay Boardwalk Marquee

Fiesta Bay Boardwalk is themed to a boardwalk setting. The area is the only area of the park that has an entrance before entering the boardwalk. The boardwalk is home to Pandemonium, a spinning roller coaster, and seven other attractions. Fiesta Bay Boardwalk was established in 1994 and was the last themed expansion area created in the park. The planks of the boardwalk were replaced in 2016 and the area was updated. Fatburger (formerly Johnny Rockets) is the only restaurant on the boardwalk.

=== Hurricane Harbor San Antonio ===
Hurricane Harbor can only be entered from within the theme park at Crackaxle Canyon. The water park is home to more than 15 water slides and attractions including a massive wave pool in the shape of Texas. The newest attraction, Thunder Rapids Water Coaster, opened in 2017 as the world's tallest, longest and fastest ProSlide RocketBlast waterslide. It opened with the park in 1992 as the Ol' Waterin' Hole. It was renamed Armadillo Beach in 1999, then renamed again in 2006 to White Water Bay. The water park is included with park admission. In March 2023, it was renamed to Hurricane Harbor San Antonio.

== Live entertainment ==
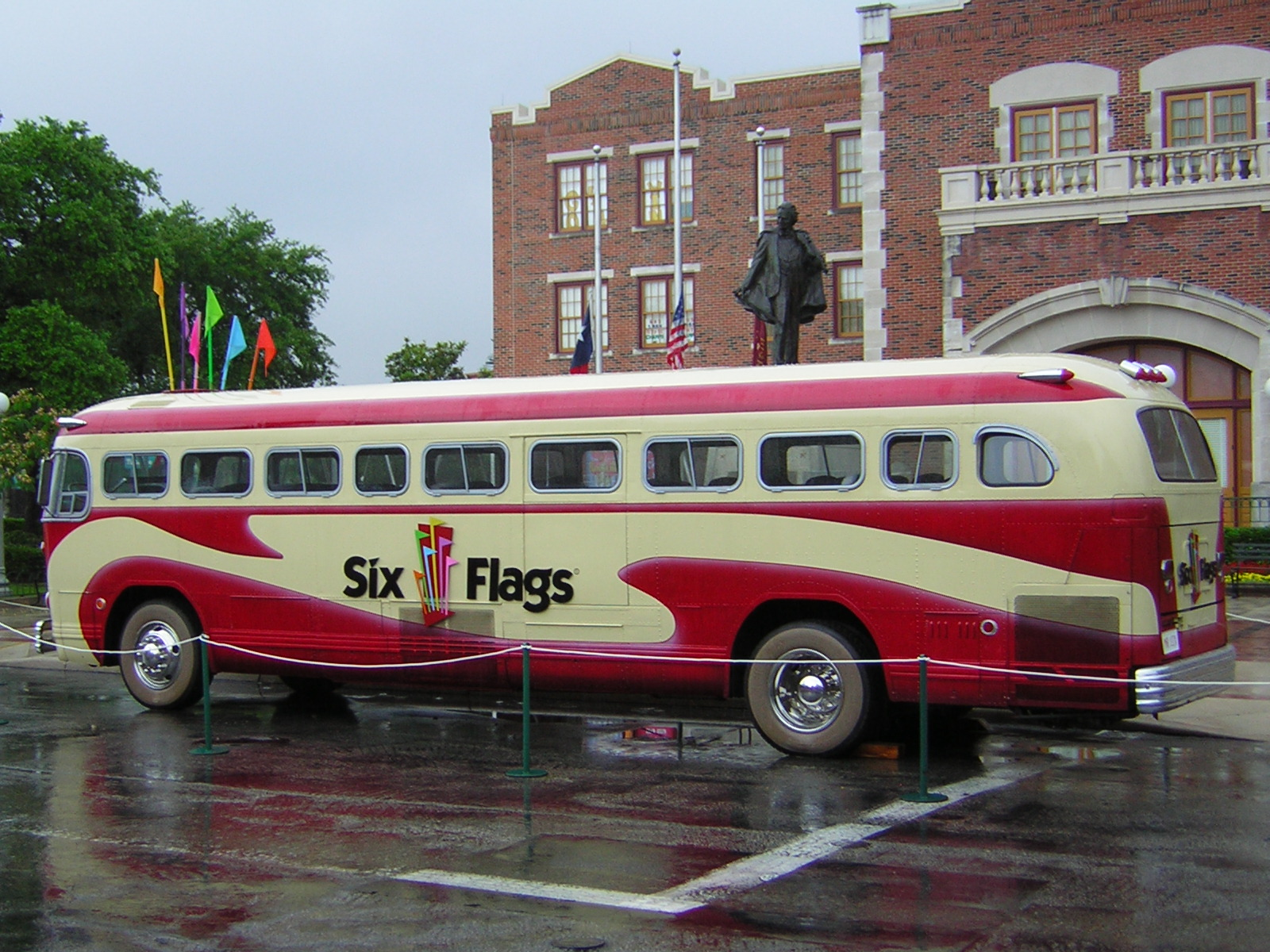
The Six Flags bus in front of Rockville High, June 2004

Six Flags Fiesta Texas has featured numerous forms of in-park entertainment throughout its history. The park generally has kept the theme of the shows to the location of the theater, such as Rockin' At Rockville High show (a 1950s style show) at the Rockville High School Theater.

Guests of the park are welcomed by a wide array of characters and performers such as characters from the Looney Tunes universe to the superheroes of DC Comics. From 2009 to late 2010, another brand of characters from the Wiggles would also greet guests in the park, before Six Flags had dropped the license to carry on the brand.

Fiesta Texas is known for having some of the best shows in America and was awarded by Amusement Today the Golden Ticket Award for "best theme park shows" for ten straight years from 1999 to 2008. Several of the shows have won individual awards like "Best Sports Show of 2005" (Xcelleration) The park has garnered several of IAAPA's Brass Ring Awards including the awards for Best Male Performer in 2011, 2013, and 2015; the 2013 award for Best Female Performer; as well 2011's Best Overall Production (budget $100,000 - $200,000) for The Majesty of Christmas. The park's halloween show, Mayer Slayer's Monster Mash Bash, was one of three finalists in 2015 for Best Overall Production (budget $100,000 - $200,000).

== Annual events ==
Six Flags Fiesta Texas hosts a number of events for different holidays all throughout the operating season that often draws thousands of visitors to the park.

- Mardi Gras (January–February), a New Orleans–style Mardi Gras celebration throughout the park, first introduced in 2017. A nightly parade with employees of the park and park-goers on many themed floats.
- Fright Fest (September–October) takes over the park with ghouls and monsters that wander around the park for the Halloween season. From Thrills by Day to Fright by Night, the park hosts themed live shows, scare zones and haunted houses. In 2020, the park reimagined their Halloween event to Hallowfest, due to the COVID-19 pandemic. The change from Fright Fest to Hallowfest, includes no haunted houses and indoor shows.
- Holiday in the Park (November–January), transforms the park during the Christmas season with millions of different lights scattered throughout the park. From Santa Claus to themed rides such as Frostee's Skating Rink. Started as Lone Star Christmas in the 1990s before the cancellation of the event after the 1997 season, but was reinstated for the 2007 season.

== See also ==
- Schlitterbahn, a Six Flags-owned water park in nearby New Braunfels, Texas
- Six Flags Over Texas, a Six Flags park in Arlington, Texas
