= List of Insane Coaster Wars episodes =

Insane Coaster Wars is an American television series broadcast by Travel Channel that premiered on July 8, 2012, and has three completed seasons. Each episode is based on a certain roller coaster category and features four coaster's per category. Before the series began, Travel Channel announced the four roller coasters in each category and allowed voters to decide which one is the best. At the end of each episode, the ride with the most votes would be the winner. Also, in the seventh episode, the top ten roller coasters from past episodes were grouped together and one was named the best.

== Series overview ==
Season	Episodes	Originally released	
Season	Episodes	First released	Last released
1	7	July 8, 2012	August 12, 2012
2	7	June 9, 2013	July 21, 2013
3	7	June 29, 2014	July 20, 2014

== Episodes ==
=== Season 1 ===
No. overall	No. in season	Title	Produced by	Written by	Winner	Original release date
1	1	"G-Force Giants"	David M. Frank	Liam Gray & Carlos Mora	Apollo's Chariot	July 8, 2012
Viewers rank the top roller coasters with the highest g-forces; Medusa at Six Flags Discovery Kingdom, Afterburn at Carowinds, Apollo's Chariot at Busch Gardens Williamsburg, and SheiKra at Busch Gardens Tampa Bay.
2	2	"Hang'em High"	David M. Frank	Elena Cruz & Mike Gatenella	Aftershock	July 8, 2012
Viewers rank the top inverted and flying roller coasters; Manta at SeaWorld Orlando, Aftershock at Silverwood Theme Park, Alpengeist at Busch Gardens Williamsburg, and Montu at Busch Gardens Tampa Bay.
3	3	"Splintering Speedsters"	David M. Frank	Liam Gray, Elisabeth de Kleer, & Carlos Mora	The Voyage	July 15, 2012
Viewers rank the top wooden roller coasters; The Beast at Kings Island, Thunderhead at Dollywood, The Voyage at Holiday World, and El Toro at Six Flags Great Adventure.
4	4	"Wrong Way Up"	David M. Frank	Elisabeth de Kleer, Mike Gatenella, & Carlos Mora	Kraken	July 22, 2012
Viewers rank the top roller coasters with several inversions; Vortex at Kings Island, Kraken at SeaWorld Orlando, Wild Eagle at Dollywood, and Hydra the Revenge at Dorney Park & Wildwater Kingdom.
5	5	"Extreme Heights"	David M. Frank	Katie Buono, Mike Gatenella, & Liam Gray	Millennium Force	July 29, 2012
Viewers rank the country's tallest steel roller coasters; Intimidator at Carowinds, Millennium Force at Cedar Point, Diamondback at Kings Island, and Kingda Ka at Six Flags Great Adventure.
6	6	"Speed Demons"	David M. Frank	Katie Buono & Elisabeth de Kleer	Top Thrill Dragster	August 5, 2012
Viewers rank the country's fastest steel roller coasters; Top Thrill Dragster at Cedar Point, Desperado at Buffalo Bill's, Bizarro at Six Flags New England, and Xcelerator at Knott's Berry Farm.
7	7	"The Top 10"	David M. Frank	Katie Buono & Mercedes Jones	Millennium Force	August 12, 2012
The top 10 roller coasters from past episodes as voted on by viewers and behind-the-scenes footage; Kraken at SeaWorld Orlando, The Voyage at Holiday World, Montu at Busch Gardens Tampa Bay, SheiKra at Busch Gardens Tampa Bay, Alpengeist at Busch Gardens Williamsburg, Manta at SeaWorld Orlando, Apollo's Chariot at Busch Gardens Williamsburg, Aftershock at Silverwood Theme Park, Top Thrill Dragster at Cedar Point, and Millennium Force at Cedar Point.

=== Season 2 (Coaster Wars: World Domination) ===
No. overall	No. in season	Title	Produced by	Written by	Winner	Original release date
1	8	"World's Fastest Coaster"	David M. Frank	Gabriel Garza & Michael Gallagher	Formula Rossa	June 9, 2013
Fans from each park rank the world's fastest roller coasters; Formula Rossa at Ferrari World Abu Dhabi, Superman – Ride of Steel at Six Flags America, Shambhala at PortAventura Park, and Tatsu at Six Flags Magic Mountain.
2	9	"305-Foot Terror Machine"	David M. Frank	Elisabeth de Kleer & Michael Gallagher	Intimidator 305	June 16, 2013
Fans from each park rank the top coasters; blue fire Megacoaster powered by GAZPROM at Europa-Park, Intimidator 305 at Kings Dominion, Tower of Terror II at Dreamworld, and Titan at Six Flags Over Texas.
3	10	"World's Tallest Woodie"	David M. Frank	Gabriel Garza, Elisabeth de Kleer, & Amy Plemons	Leviathan	June 23, 2013
Fans from each park rank the top coasters; Leviathan at Canada's Wonderland, Griffon at Busch Gardens Williamsburg, Colossos at Heide Park, and Skyrush at Hersheypark.
4	11	"0-100 in Under Two Seconds"	David M. Frank	Unknown	Texas Giant	June 30, 2013
Fans from each park rank the top coasters; Dodonpa at Fuji-Q Highland, Nitro at Six Flags Great Adventure, Expedition GeForce at Holiday Park, and Texas Giant at Six Flags Over Texas.
5	12	"World's Steepest Drop"	David M. Frank	Unknown	Maverick	July 7, 2013
Fans from each park rank the top coasters; Furius Baco at PortAventura Park, Volcano: The Blast Coaster at Kings Dominion, Takabisha at Fuji-Q Highland, and Maverick at Cedar Point.
6	13	"Upside Down Under"	David M. Frank	Unknown	X2	July 14, 2013
Fans from each park rank the top coasters; Superman Escape at Warner Bros. Movie World, X2 at Six Flags Magic Mountain, iSpeed at Mirabilandia, and X-Flight at Six Flags Great America.
7	14	"World's First Hypercoaster"	David M. Frank	Unknown	Magnum XL-200	July 21, 2013
Fans from each park rank the top coasters; Katun at Mirabilandia, Magnum XL-200 at Cedar Point, Behemoth at Canada's Wonderland, and Batwing at Six Flags America.

=== Season 3 (Coaster Wars: World Domination) ===
No. overall	No. in season	Title	Produced by	Written by	Winner	Original release date
1	15	"Tilting Terror"	TBA	Unknown	Iron Rattler	June 29, 2014
Fans from each park rank the top coasters; Gravity Max at Lihpao Land, Mamba at Worlds of Fun, Superman: La Atracción de Acero at Parque Warner Madrid, and Iron Rattler at Six Flags Fiesta Texas.
2	16	"Inverted Woodie"	TBA	Unknown	Outlaw Run	June 29, 2014
Fans from each park rank the top coasters; Outlaw Run at Silver Dollar City, Insane Speed at Janfusun Fancyworld, Avalancha at Xetulul Theme Park, and Phantom's Revenge at Kennywood.
3	17	"World's Tallest Loop"	TBA	Unknown	Mr. Freeze: Reverse Blast	July 6, 2014
Fans from each park rank the top coasters; Full Throttle at Six Flags Magic Mountain, Goliath at La Ronde, Mr. Freeze: Reverse Blast at Six Flags St. Louis, and Wodan Timbur Coaster at Europa-Park.
4	18	"318-foot Scream Machine"	TBA	Unknown	Cheetah Hunt	July 6, 2014
Fans from each park rank the top coasters; Steel Dragon 2000 at Nagashima Spa Land, Gatekeeper at Cedar Point, Coaster Express at Parque Warner Madrid, and Cheetah Hunt at Busch Gardens Tampa.
5	19	"Beyond Vertical Drop"	TBA	Unknown	Kumba	July 13, 2014
Fans from each park rank the top coasters; Silver Star at Europa-Park, Fahrenheit at Hersheypark, Kumba at Busch Gardens Tampa Bay, and White Cyclone at Nagashima Spa Land
6	20	"255-foot Plunge"	TBA	Unknown	Superman el Último Escape	July 13, 2014
Fans from each park rank the top coasters; Goliath at Six Flags Magic Mountain, Raptor at Cedar Point, Ednör – L'Attaque at La Ronde, and Superman el Último Escape at Six Flags México
7	21	"21-story Free Fall"	TBA	Unknown	Medusa Steel Coaster	July 20, 2014
Fans from each park rank the top coasters; Superman: Krypton Coaster at Six Flags Fiesta Texas, The Boss at Six Flags St. Louis, Medusa Steel Coaster at Six Flags México, and Big One at Blackpool Pleasure Beach
