= Insane Coaster Wars =

- Genre: Scripted entertainment
- Written by: Liam Gray; Carlos Mora; Elena Cruz; Mike Gatenella; Elisabeth de Kleer; Katie Buono; Mercedes Jones
- Narrated by: Andrew Morgado
- Country of origin: United States
- Original language: English
- No. of seasons: 3
- No. of episodes: 21 (list of episodes)

Production
- Executive producer: David M. Frank
- Running time: 30–60 minutes

Original release
- Network: Travel Channel
- Release: July 8, 2012 – July 20, 2014

Related
- Insane Coaster Wars: World Domination (Summer 2013); Xtreme Waterparks

Insane Coaster Wars is an American television series broadcast by Travel Channel that premiered on July 8, 2012, and has three completed seasons. Each episode is based on a certain roller coaster category and features four coasters per category. Before the series began, Travel Channel announced the four roller coasters in each category and allowed voters to decide which one is the best. At the end of each episode, the ride with the most votes would be the winner.

== Season one ==
=== Winners ===
Ep #	Episode Title	Winning Coaster
1	The Top 10	Millennium Force at Cedar Point
2	G-Force Giants	Apollo's Chariot at Busch Gardens Williamsburg
3	Hang'em High	Aftershock at Silverwood Theme Park
4	Splintering Speedsters	The Voyage at Holiday World
5	Wrong Way Up	Kraken at SeaWorld Orlando
6	Extreme Heights	Millennium Force at Cedar Point
7	Speed Demons	Top Thrill Dragster at Cedar Point

== Season two ==
In September 2012, it was announced that Travel Channel would start filming and producing a second season of Insane Coaster Wars given the subtitle World Domination. Three coasters were confirmed for inclusion ahead of the second season; Behemoth and Leviathan at Canada's Wonderland, and Crystal Wing at Happy Valley Beijing. Season two premiered on June 9, 2013.

=== Winners ===
Ep #	Episode Title	Winning Coaster
1	World's Fastest Coaster	Formula Rossa at Ferrari World
2	305-Foot Terror Machine	Intimidator 305 at Kings Dominion
3	World's Tallest Woodie	Leviathan at Canada's Wonderland
4	0-100 in Under Two Seconds	Texas Giant at Six Flags Over Texas
5	World's Steepest Drop	Maverick at Cedar Point
6	Upside Down Under	X2 at Six Flags Magic Mountain
7	World's First Hypercoaster	Magnum XL-200 at Cedar Point

== Season three ==
In April 2014, it was announced that Travel Channel would begin airing season three of Insane Coaster Wars on June 29, 2014.

=== Winners ===
Ep #	Episode Title	Winning Coaster
1	Tilting Terror	Iron Rattler at Six Flags Fiesta Texas
2	Inverted Woodie	Outlaw Run at Silver Dollar City
3	World's Tallest Loop	Mr. Freeze: Reverse Blast at Six Flags St. Louis
4	318-foot Scream Machine	Cheetah Hunt at Busch Gardens Tampa
5	Beyond Vertical Drop	Kumba at Busch Gardens Tampa
6	255-foot Plunge	Superman el Último Escape at Six Flags Mexico
7	21-story Free Fall	Medusa at Six Flags Mexico
