= Millennium Force =

Steel roller coaster at Cedar Point

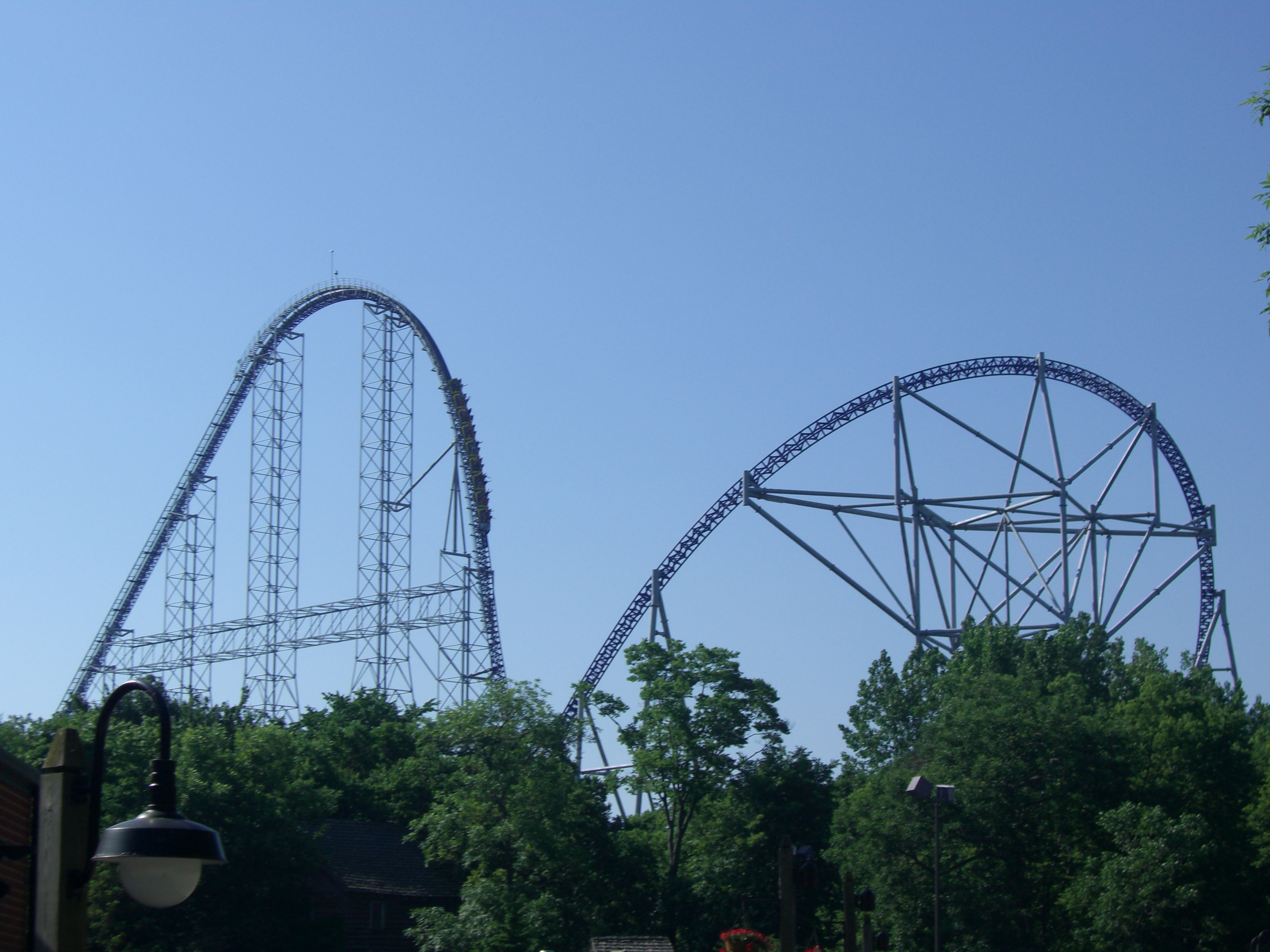
- The 310-foot (94 m) lift hill and 122-degree turn of Millennium Force

Cedar Point
- Location: Cedar Point
- Park section: Millennium Midway
- Coordinates: 41°28′54″N 82°41′17″W
- Status: Operating
- Soft opening date: May 11, 2000
- Opening date: May 13, 2000
- Cost: US$25,000,000
- Replaced: Giant Wheel

General statistics
- Type: Steel
- Manufacturer: Intamin
- Designer: Werner Stengel
- Model: Giga Coaster
- Track layout: Out and back
- Lift/launch system: Cable lift hill
- Height: 310 ft (94 m)
- Drop: 300 ft (91 m)
- Length: 6,595 ft (2,010 m)
- Speed: 93 mph (150 km/h)
- Inversions: 0
- Duration: 2:20
- Max vertical angle: 80°
- Capacity: 1,300 riders per hour
- G-force: 4.5
- Height restriction: 48–78 in (122–198 cm)
- Trains: 3 trains with 9 cars; riders arranged 2 across in 2 rows for a total of 36 riders per train
- Restraints: T-lap bar with seatbelt
- Fast Lane Plus available
- Millennium Force at RCDB

Video

Millennium Force is a steel roller coaster located at Cedar Point amusement park in Sandusky, Ohio, United States. Manufactured by Intamin, it was the park's fourteenth roller coaster when it opened in 2000, dating back to the opening of Blue Streak in 1964. Upon completion, Millennium Force broke five world records and was the world's first giga coaster, a term coined by Intamin and Cedar Point to represent a roller coaster that exceeds 300 feet (91 m) in height. It was briefly the tallest and fastest in the world until Steel Dragon 2000 opened later the same year. The ride is also the third-longest roller coaster in North America following The Beast at Kings Island and Fury 325 at Carowinds.

Millennium Force features a 310-foot-tall (94 m) cable lift hill with a 300-foot (91 m) drop, two tunnels, three overbanked turns, and three hills. The coaster also has a top speed of 93 mph (150 km/h). Since its debut, Millennium Force has been voted the number one steel roller coaster ten times in Amusement Today's annual Golden Ticket Awards. Millennium Force remains the sixth fastest, sixth tallest, and seventh longest roller coaster in operation.

== History ==
The planning, design and development phases of Millennium Force took place over four years, from 1996 to 2000. The first rumors that a new record-breaking roller coaster would be built at Cedar Point, which included speculation about a ten-inversion roller coaster from Bolliger & Mabillard and an Arrow Dynamics MegaLooper, began circulating in early 1998. A roller coaster from D. H. Morgan Manufacturing was also rumored. On July 2, 1999, Cedar Fair Entertainment Company filed a trademark for the name Millennium Force, which raised more speculation about what the ride would be like. About a week later, the first track pieces were seen at the park, and it was confirmed that the ride would be manufactured by Intamin. Cedar Point officials also confirmed that it would not have inversions.

=== Announcement and construction ===
Millennium Force was announced on July 22, 1999. It would be the tallest roller coaster in the world, taking the record from Fujiyama at Fuji-Q Highland in Japan. The ride cost $25 million to design and build. Cedar Point, Intamin, and Werner Stengel designed the layout of the ride. After the ride was announced, several disputes about whether Millennium Force or Superman: The Escape was the tallest and fastest roller coaster in the world arose between Cedar Point and Six Flags Magic Mountain. Superman: The Escape is 415 feet (126 m) high and its speed is 100 miles per hour (160 km/h); however, it is a shuttle roller coaster, not a complete-circuit roller coaster.

Construction started in August 1999 when the site was cleared. Millennium Force was built in the Frontier Trail section of the park. The ride involved the relocation of the Giant Wheel and the Cedar Point and Lake Erie Railroad. The removal and relocation of the Giant Wheel began in October on closing day; the first of 226 supports was installed on October 11, starting at the brake run. Two hundred twenty-six footers, each about 5 feet (1.5 m) deep were dug; the largest ones were 56 by 56 feet (17 by 17 m). The concrete construction was done by Mosser Construction. The lift hill was topped off in early January 2000.

The ride's construction took seven months, and 120 construction workers and project managers participated. Testing took two months. The park conducted a "pull-through" by pulling a train along the course to ensure proper clearance. The ride was inspected and tested with water-dummies on the trains.

=== Opening and modifications ===
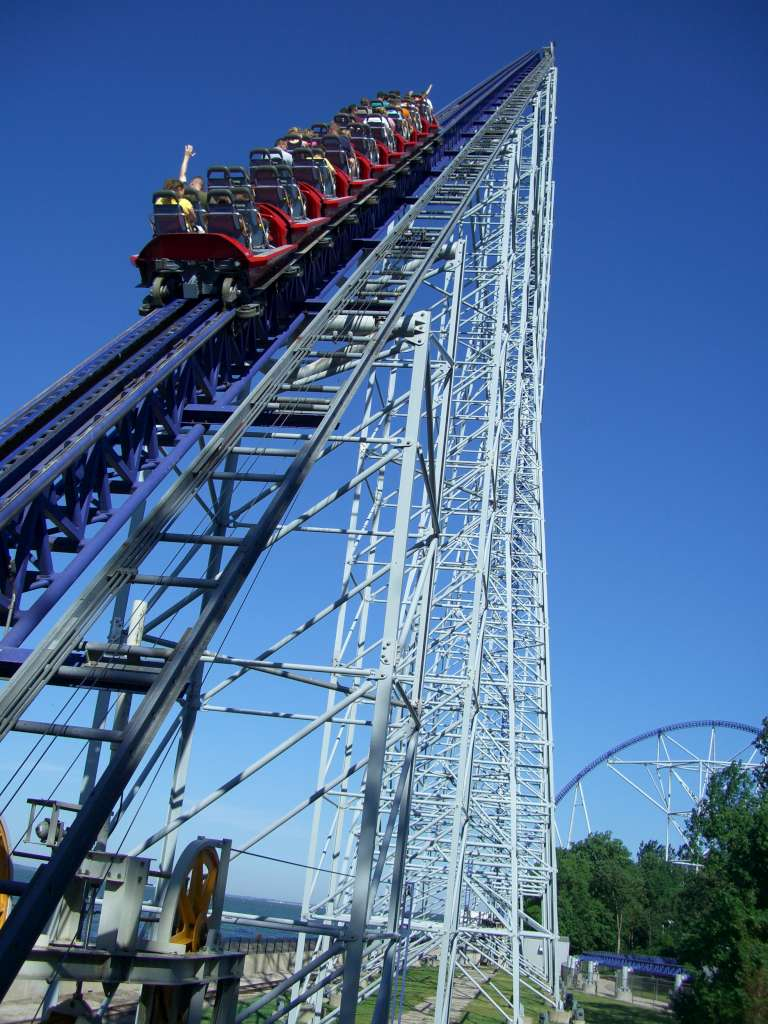
The red train ascending the 310-foot (94 m) lift hill

The first media event was held on May 11, 2000, and the ride opened to the public two days later on May 13. When it opened, it broke six world records. It was the first Giga Coaster and was the world's fastest complete-circuit roller coaster, but was later overtaken by other rides. The ride was so popular that guests consistently waited three to four hours to board. About a month after Millennium's debut, Cedar Point introduced a virtual queue system, "Ticket to Ride", which allowed visitors to buy a ticket then return later and wait in a shorter line. In August, Cedar Point engaged John Hancock and Associates and Stalker Radar of Indianapolis to measure the height and speed of Millennium Force. The height was measured at 310 feet 11 inches (94.77 m), and the speed was measured at 93 miles per hour (150 km/h), slightly faster than what the park had been advertising (92 mph (148 km/h)).

Before the start of the 2004 season, Millennium Force's seat belts were modified because of an incident that occurred on Superman the Ride, a similar roller coaster at Six Flags New England. The new seat belts were shorter and some riders had difficulties with them. The roller coaster's layout was repainted over a three-year period, before the 2011, 2012 and 2013 seasons. In 2012, the park added a new LED lighting system.

For the 2020 season, following the COVID-19 pandemic, timed boarding passes called "Access Passes" were used temporarily to comply with social distancing guidelines in effect at the time.

To celebrate its 25th anniversary, Millennium Force received a refresh for 2025. This included a repaint of the coaster, with the colors remaining the same, as well as a new control system that was installed, featuring a new lift drive motor.

== Ride experience ==
=== Queue ===
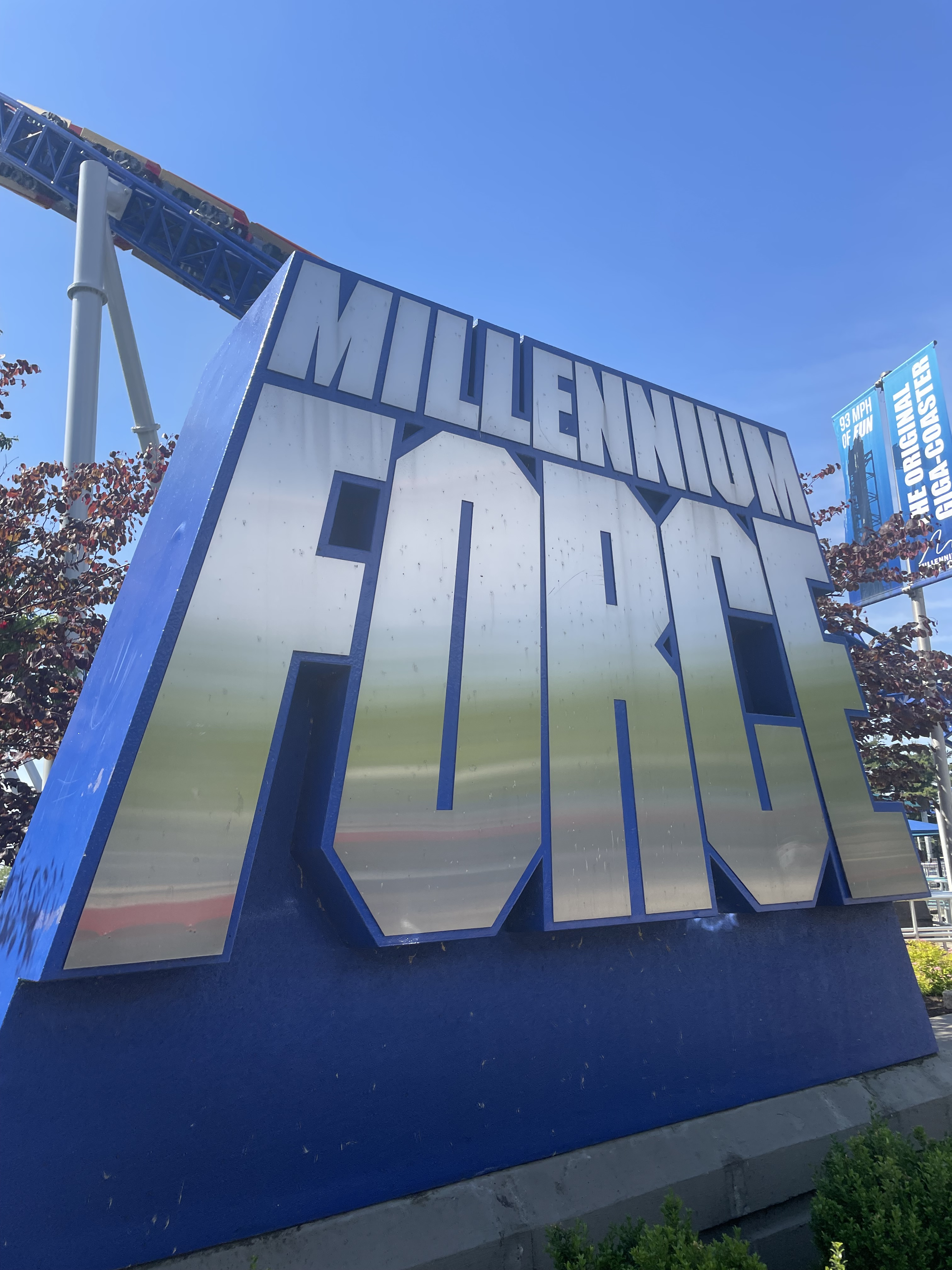
Millennium Force’s entrance sign

Millennium Force's entrance is located behind the Cedar Point & Lake Erie Railroad's Millennium Midway station. The queue is situated between the ride's last overbanked turn and the station. A DJ booth was originally provided to entertain waiting visitors; the park's "Jamming DJ's" took requests for family friendly songs from people in the queue. The concrete base of the booth can still be seen as of 2025.

About a month after Millennium's debut, Cedar Point introduced a new queue system known as "Ticket to Ride" (later Fast Lane) to reduce the wait time. Visitors could buy tickets then return later and wait in a shorter line. This system was discontinued in 2004 after several people complained it was unfair that others were going ahead of them in line. In 2012, Cedar Point introduced its Fast Lane queue system on the ride; visitors can buy a wristband which enables them to wait in a shorter line. The system was tested at Kings Island the previous year, where it received positive reviews.

=== Layout ===
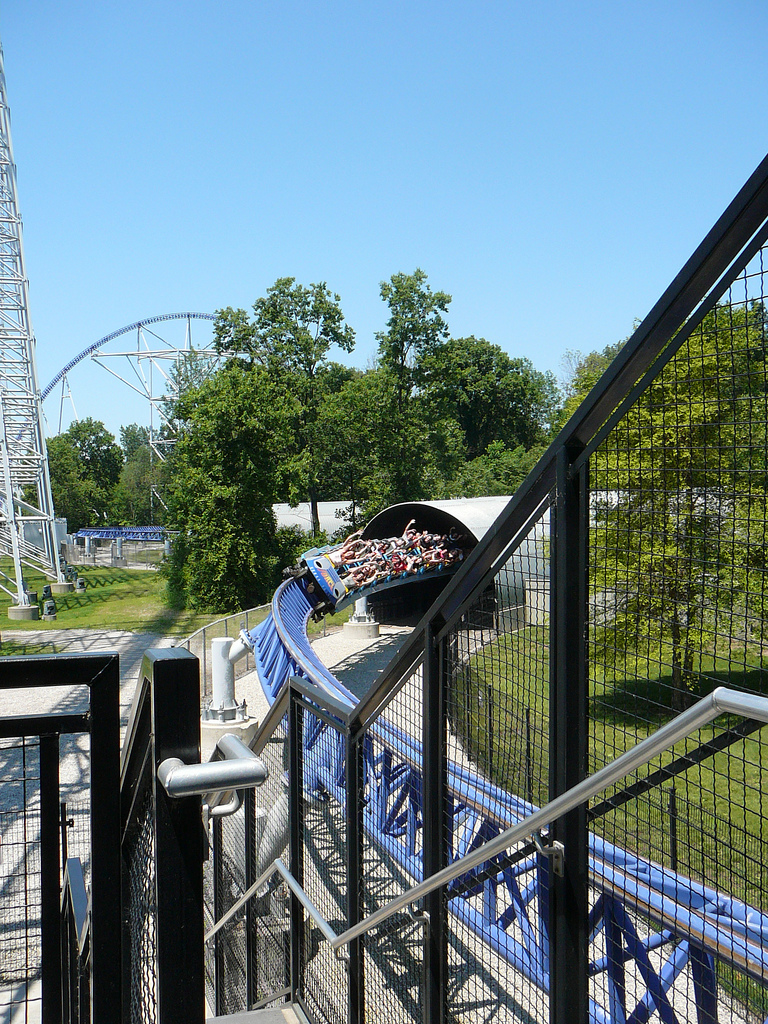
The blue train exiting the second tunnel

Millennium Force covers 13 acres (5.3 ha); it runs parallel to the shoreline of Sandusky Bay, then travels to an island located inside the park. There are two tunnels, three overbanked turns and three hills. One cycle of the ride takes approximately 2 minutes and 20 seconds.

While the train is being loaded with passengers, the catch car for the cable lift descends the lift hill and latches onto the middle car underneath the train. Once the train is cleared, the cable lift immediately pulls the train up the 45-degree lift hill at 15 mph (24 km/h) to a height of 310 feet (94 m). The train then drops 300 feet (91 m) at an 80-degree angle and reaches a maximum speed of 93 mph (150 km/h) at the bottom of the hill. This is followed by a climb of 169 feet (52 m) through a right overbanked turn at 122 degrees from the horizontal axis, of which the train then travels through a tunnel as it passes over the Frontier Trail. The train proceeds over a 182-foot (55 m) parabolic hill, which provides a moment of zero gravity as it passes over a lagoon and down onto Adventure Island.

It completes an 87-foot (27 m), 360-degree right-handed helix, followed by a 100-foot (30 m) 122-degree left overbanked turn. This is followed by a small right-hand turn and another hill that leaves the island. The train then travels left through a second tunnel where the on-ride photo is taken, followed by a left turn and a small hill, passing by the queue. Finally, the train travels 68 feet (21 m) high through another right overbanked turn over the queue and is stopped by magnetic brakes. Passengers disembark the ride at an unloading station and the train moves to a second station where it is reloaded with passengers.

== Characteristics ==
=== Manufacturer ===
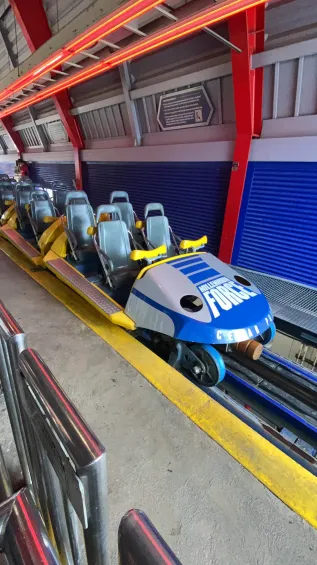
Close-up of the trains

Millennium Force is a Giga Coaster model designed by Werner Stengel and built by Liechtenstein-based manufacturer Intamin. It was the first of a series of roller coasters, including Top Thrill Dragster—the tallest and fastest roller coaster in the world in 2003—that Intamin built at Cedar Point. As of 2026, Millennium Force is one of two Giga Coasters built by Intamin, the other being Pantherian at Kings Dominion.

=== Trains ===
Millennium Force operates with three fiberglass, stadium-style seating trains colored red, yellow, and blue. Each train has nine cars that seat four passengers, allowing a maximum capacity of 36 people per train and 1,300 riders an hour. Each seat has an individual, hydraulic, T-shaped lap bar and seat belt which rests across the rider's lap. Each train weighs 19 tons.

=== Station ===
The station has two separate platforms, one for unloading and another for loading. Two trains are loaded and unloaded while the third train is running the course. There is also a separate line in the station where riders can wait for the first seat. The loading platform has red overhead lights, which are located above the train. Millennium Force's theme song is played in the station while riders are boarding. In 2024, 4 confirmed sets of dispatch audio were added for when a train exits the station. It is also unknown whether these audio sets had previously been featured before its current installment. Two projectors in the station were deactivated sometime in the 2000s, before being reintroduced in a new but limited fashion in 2024.

=== Track ===
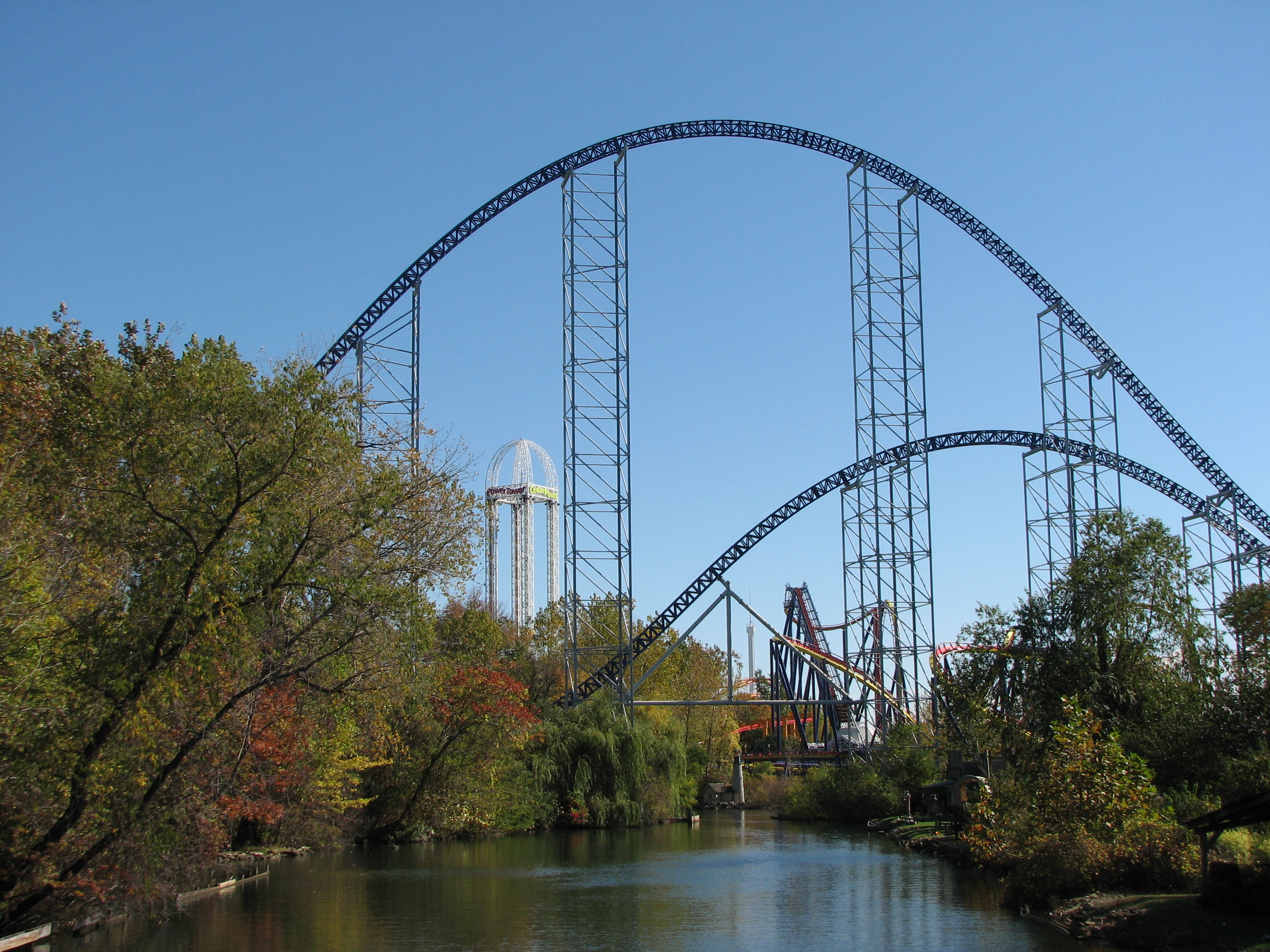
Two hills cross the lagoon onto the island

The steel tubular track is 6,595 feet (2,010 m) long and the lift is approximately 310 feet (94 m) high. The track is blue, and the supports are silver, consisting of 229 pieces with each weighing between 11,000 and 17,000 pounds (5,000 and 7,700 kg).

Intamin supplied the track with hollow structural sections (HSS), which is used in all the track pieces, supports, and towers. Millennium Force uses three different track shapes. The simplest sections are two-pipe track, made with two running rails connected by 6-inch (15 cm) square HSS cross-members. The ride also uses three-pipe track, which has two running rails with a backbone of round HSS, which forms a triangle. The third type of track forms a square and is considered the strongest. It has two running rails with two backbone tubes.

As both a high altitude and high velocity ride, Millennium Force is affected by unfavorable weather conditions such as rain, lightning, or strong winds. The ride may close under these conditions, although it can remain open under light rain

== Lighting ==
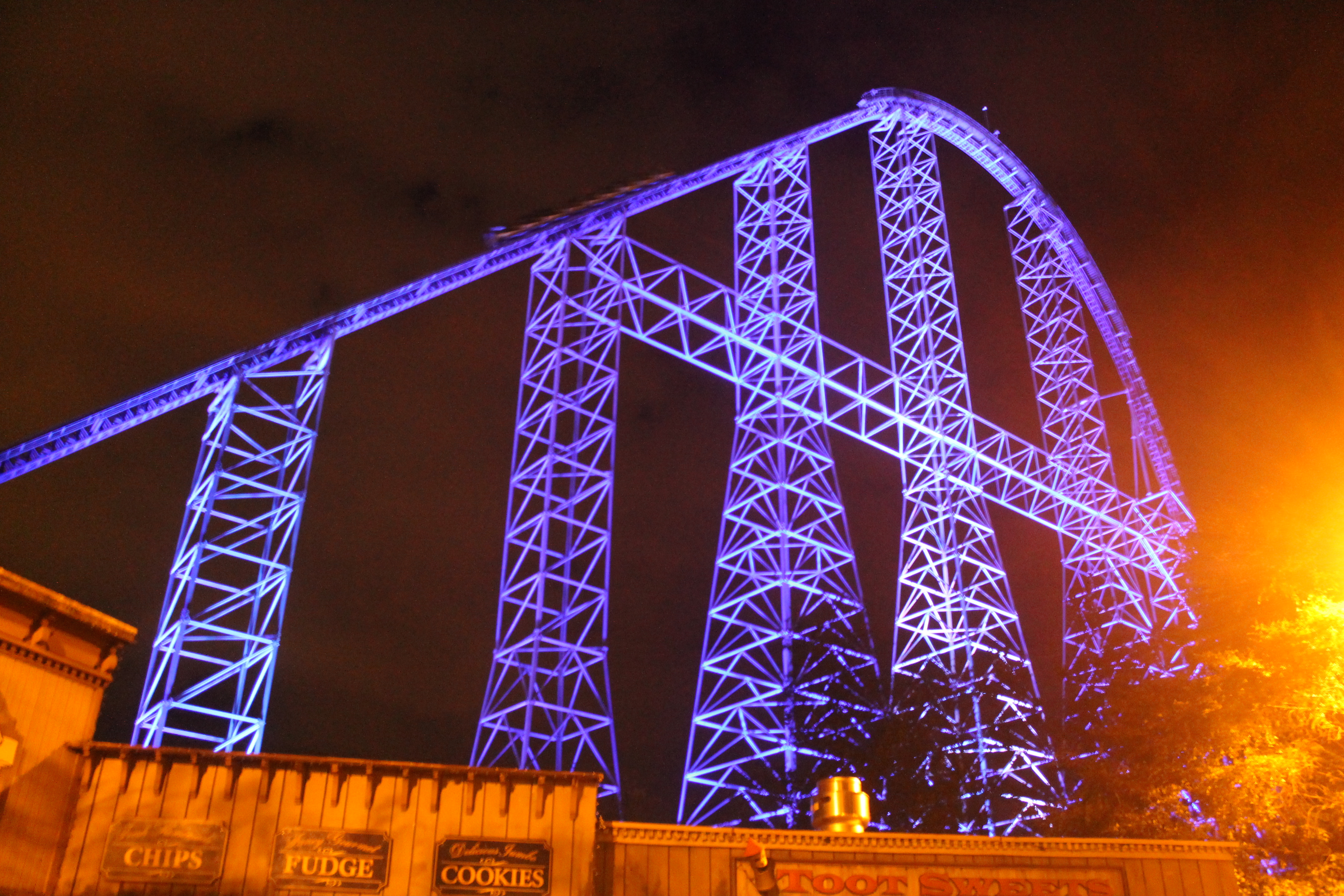
Millennium Force, illuminated at night (2012)

When the ride opened in 2000, Cedar Point chose High End Systems, headquartered in Austin, Texas, to light the ride. Rob Decker, Cedar Point's Corporate Director of Planning & Design, said that they thought they would have to mount multiple floodlights on the tower. However, they were able to install thirty EC-1 floodlights at the base of the lift hill structure which provided lighting throughout the ride's structure. Of the six main support towers, three had six EC-1s, and three towers had four EC-1s. The three tallest towers had another unit in the middle.

In 2012, Cedar Point introduced a nighttime show, Luminosity — Ignite the Night!, to "re-energize" the park at the end of the day. New LED lights from Sunrise, Florida-based Chauvet Professional were installed to illuminate the ride. Twenty COLORado Range and ten COLORado Ridge wash lights were installed at the base of the lift hill structure.

== Records ==
When it opened in May 2000, Millennium Force broke five world records among roller coasters and utilized a relatively new magnetic braking system instead of the commonly used friction brakes. This system enabled the use of a shorter brake run, enabling the train to slow down from 65 mph (105 km/h) to a standstill in only six seconds.

Millennium Force's records as the tallest and fastest complete-circuit roller coaster were broken several months later in August when Steel Dragon 2000 opened. It remained the tallest and fastest at Cedar Point until 2003, when the park debuted Top Thrill Dragster, the tallest and fastest roller coaster in the world.

=== Roller coaster records ===
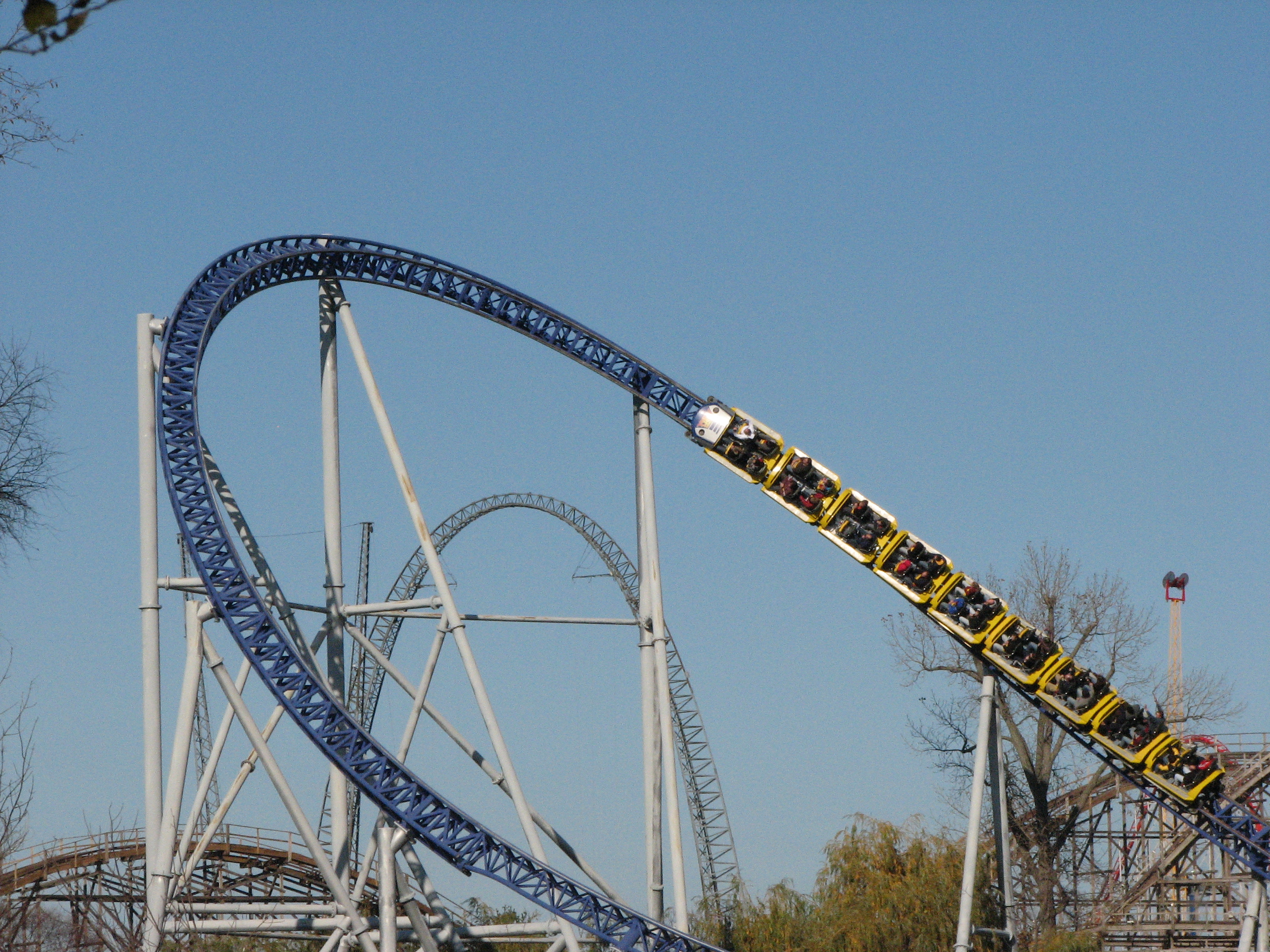
The yellow train in the second overbanked turn on the island

Millennium Force held the following records at the time of its debut:

- First ever complete-circuit roller coaster to top 300 feet (91 m)
- Tallest complete-circuit roller coaster (310 feet (94 m))
- Longest drop on a complete-circuit roller coaster (300 feet (91 m))
- Fastest complete-circuit roller coaster (93 miles per hour (150 km/h))
- Steepest non-inversion banked turn on a roller coaster (122°) (Half Corkscrew)

=== Park records ===
At the time of Millennium Force's debut, Cedar Point held records for the following:

- Most rides at an amusement park (68)
- Most roller coasters at an amusement park (14)
- Most steel roller coasters at an amusement park (12)
- Most feet of roller coaster track at an amusement park (44,013 ft)

== Reception ==
Millennium Force often has one of the longest lines in the park, with passengers waiting over four hours when the ride debuted. The ride received positive reactions from visitors, many of whom said it was smooth and very comfortable. Others said, "It'll scare the daylights out of you". In its first six years of operation, Millennium Force had over 10 million riders. By August 2012, Millennium had given more than 21 million rides. Several television shows, including the Travel Channel's Extreme Terror Rides, Bert the Conqueror, Off Limits, the Discovery Channel's Extreme Rides, and the National Geographic Channel's Super Coasters have featured Millennium Force. Out of over 500 roller coasters that Werner Stengel has engineered, he stated that Millennium Force is his favorite. Robb Alvey, a notable roller coaster enthusiast, called it a "milestone in roller coaster history".

=== Rankings ===
Millennium Force has regularly ranked highly in various polls and has won multiple awards. Millennium Force and Superman the Ride (formerly Bizarro) at Six Flags New England held the top two places in the Golden Ticket Awards from 2001 to 2015, and Millennium has continued to rank among the top six steel roller coasters since then. In the Travel Channel's Insane Coaster Wars, Millennium Force was voted the "fan favorite" in the Extreme Heights and The Top 10 categories. In 2013, Time ranked Millennium Force as the top roller coaster in the United States.

Golden Ticket Awards: Top steel Roller Coasters
Year									1998	1999
Ranking									–	–
Year	2000	2001	2002	2003	2004	2005	2006	2007	2008	2009
Ranking	2	1	1	2	1	1	2	2	2	2
Year	2010	2011	2012	2013	2014	2015	2016	2017	2018	2019
Ranking	1	1	1	1	1	1	2	2	2	2
Year	2020	2021	2022	2023	2024	2025	2026			
Ranking	N/A	2	3	2	4	6	6			

NAPHA Survey: Favorite Steel Roller Coaster
Year	2005	2006	2007	2008	2009	2010	2011	2012	2013	2014	2015	2016	2017	2018
Ranking	1	1	1	1	1	1	1	1	1	1	1	1	1	2

== Incidents ==
- On September 2, 2001, the cable used to haul trains up the lift broke during a morning test run, resulting in the stranding of 30 park employees at the top of the coaster's lift hill 275 feet (84 m) above ground. It took about an hour for all employees to be brought down.
- On October 16, 2026, a metal bracket fell from a car on one of the coaster's trains into a guest area. No injuries were reported. The coaster was temporarily closed and reopened the following evening after safety inspections.

Preceded by Fujiyama	World's tallest complete circuit roller coaster May 2000 – August 2000	Succeeded by Steel Dragon 2000
Preceded by Goliath	World's fastest complete circuit roller coaster May 2000 – August 2000	Succeeded by Steel Dragon 2000
