= Cedar Point & Lake Erie Railroad =

Amusement park steam train ride

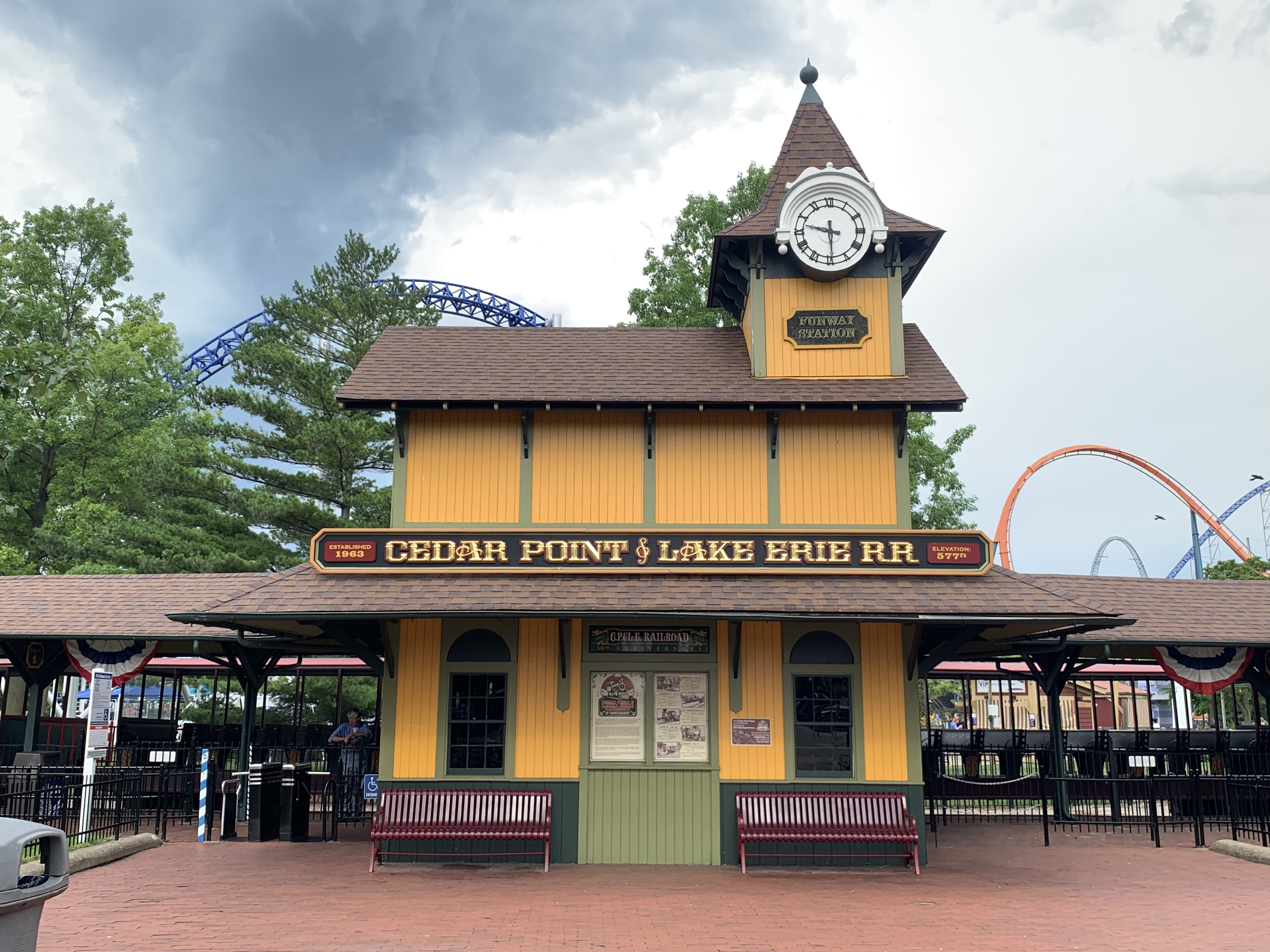
- Funway station in July 2022

Overview
- Locale: Cedar Point Amusement Park; Sandusky, Ohio
- Dates of operation: 1963–present

Technical
- Track gauge: 3 ft (914 mm)
- Length: Over 2 miles (3.2 km)

The Cedar Point & Lake Erie Railroad is a 3 ft (914 mm) narrow-gauge heritage railroad and amusement park attraction located in the Cedar Point amusement park in Sandusky, Ohio. The railroad opened in 1963, making it one of the oldest operating rides at Cedar Point. It consists of a total of five steam locomotives, with four of them in operating condition.

== History ==
The railroad originally opened in 1963 with construction starting in the Fall of 1962. Some of the railroad cars were previously 4 ft 8 1/2 in (1,435 mm) standard gauge before being converted to 3 ft (914 mm) gauge. The railroad runs on a 2-mile circuit around the park. There are currently two stations, the Main Station in Celebration Plaza and the Frontier Town Station in Frontier Town. Much track work has been done over the years to re-route the track but the most significant track work came in 2007 when the track by the Frontier Town station had to be re-done to navigate around Cedar Point's new coaster, Maverick.

In 2019, Cedar Point & Lake Erie Railroad celebrated its 55th anniversary. In its first 55 years of operation the ride had more than 120 million passengers.

== Locomotives ==
There are currently five steam locomotives on the railroad, with four of them in operating condition, #44 "Judy K.", #22 "Myron H.", #4 "George R.", and #1 "G.A. Boeckling". Myron H. or Judy K. are the primary locomotives used on a daily basis. Either locomotive can be used as the second engine for two train operations. The G.A. Boeckling and the George R. are available as back ups if their services are needed. The engines used at Cedar Point are all historic locomotives that were built for a variety of uses before ending up at the park. All four of the operating engines fire on coal as their fuel source.

=== Engine #44 "Judy K." ===
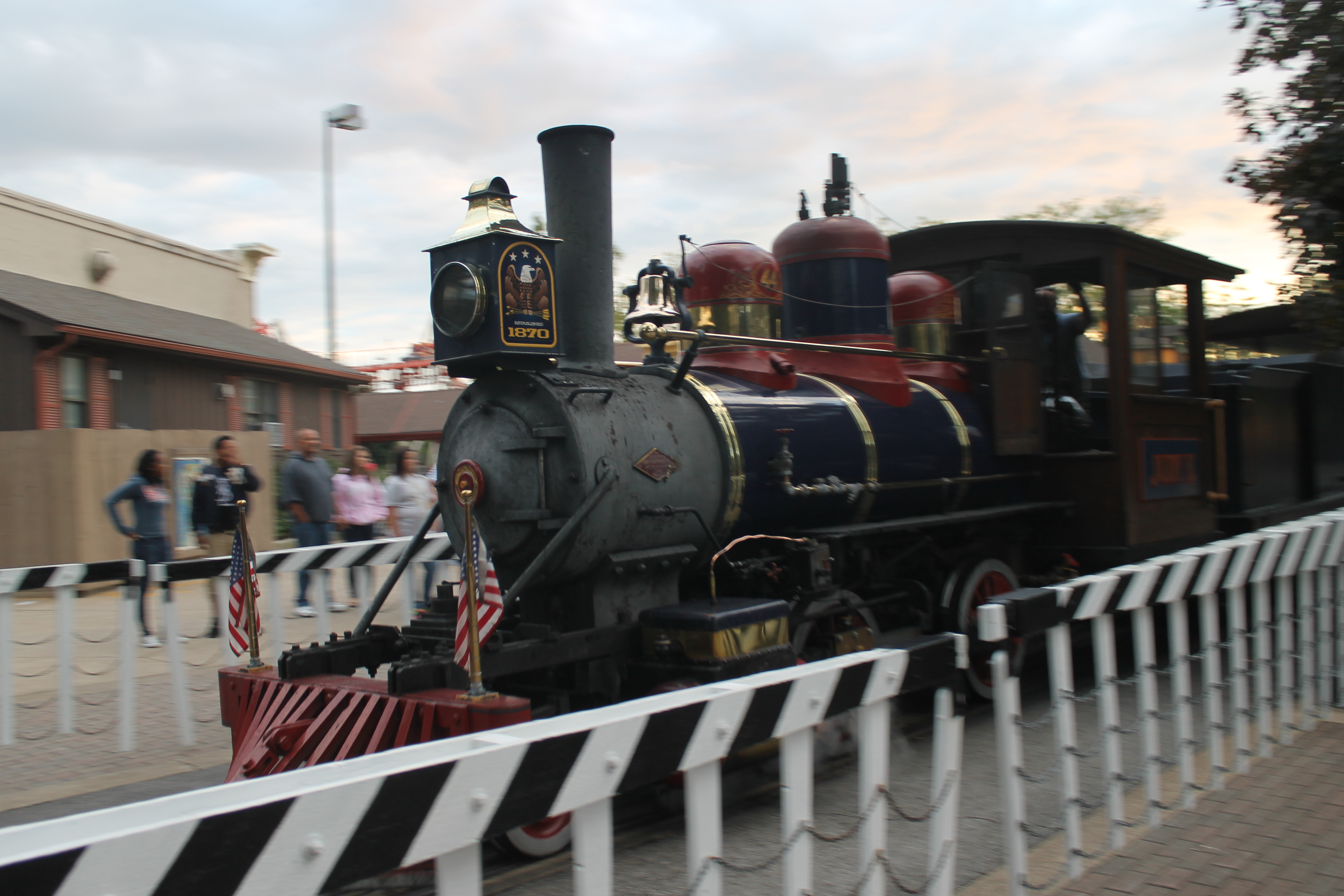
Judy K. locomotive at a grade crossing

Engine #44, nicknamed the "Judy K.", was built by the Vulcan Iron Works in Wilkes-Barre, Pennsylvania in 1923 as construction number 3333. As an 0-4-0T type, it is nearly identical to the engine which became the Myron H. It is not known who the original owner was, but it was sold at an unknown date to the Lehigh Stone Company in Lehigh, Illinois. In 1960, it was sold to Peter Burno, a private collector in Spring Green, Wisconsin. It was sold to Cedar Point in August 1968 and converted to a 2-4-0 type with tender. It was unnamed until 1974, when it was named the "Jack Foster" after the first superintendent of the Cedar Point & Lake Erie Railroad. The engine had been retired by the late 1980s and sat with the Myron H. in the back of the enginehouse. It was fully restored in 1992 and renamed the "Judy K." after the wife of Richard Kinzel.

=== Engine #22 "Myron H." ===
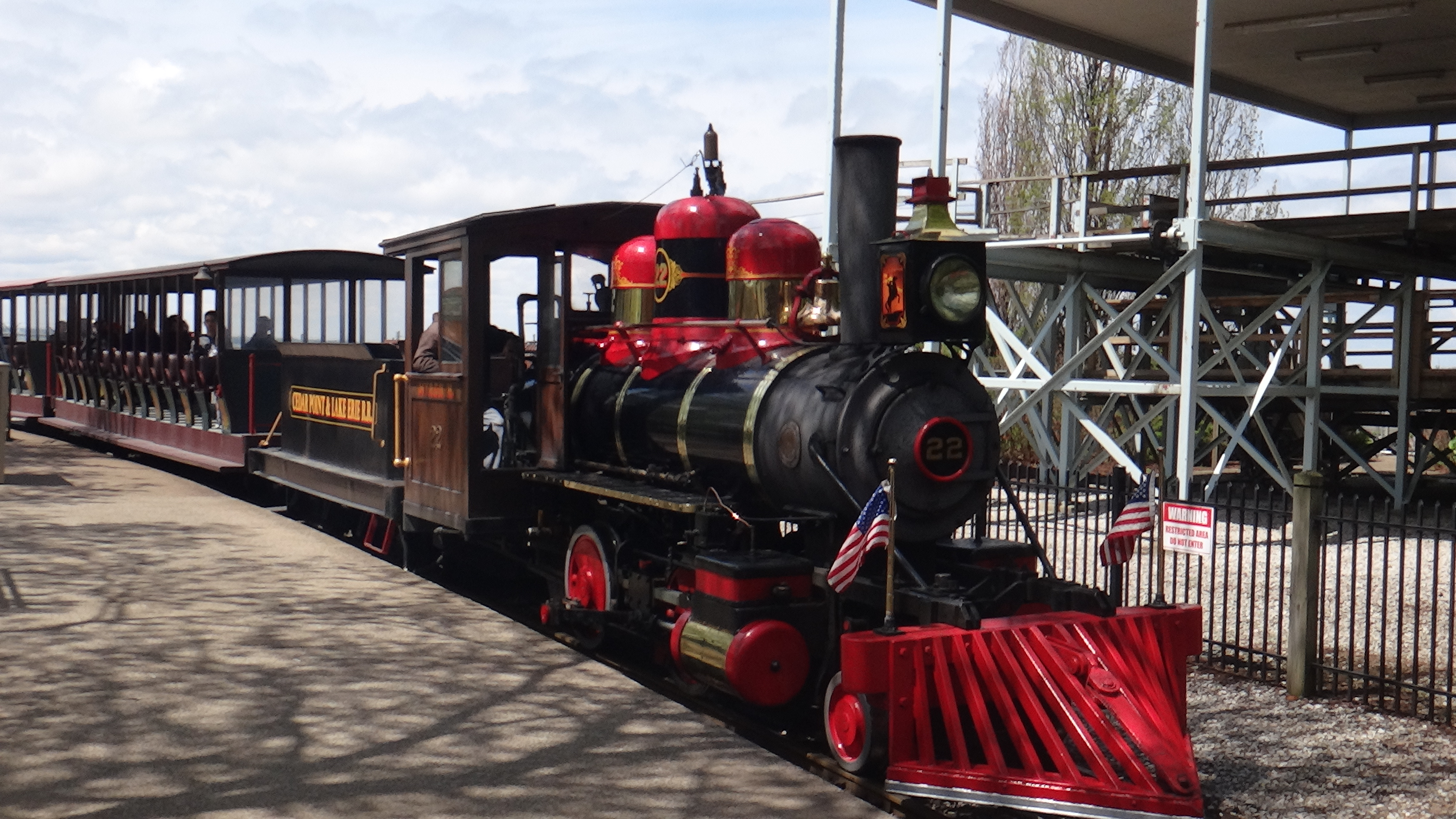
Myron H. entering Frontier Town Station

Engine #22, nicknamed the "Myron H.", was built by the Vulcan Iron Works in Wilkes-Barre, Pennsylvania in October 1922 as construction number 3264 and was sold to the Wayne Coal Company in Claybank, Ohio to haul coal. As an 0-4-0T type, it is nearly identical to the engine which became the Judy K.

It was sold in 1927 to Birmingham Rail and Locomotive Products, a locomotive broker based in Birmingham, Alabama. It was then used by Standard Coated Products in Hephzibah, Georgia, the Merry Brothers Brick and Tile Company in Augusta, Georgia, and private collector Charles Weber in Archbold, Ohio. It was sold to Cedar Point in 1963 and converted to a 2-4-0 with tender. In 1981 it was named "Myron H." after Mike "Myron" Hetrick, a superintendent of the Cedar Point & Lake Erie Railroad. The Myron H. had been retired by the late 1980s and sat in the back of the engine house with the #5 Jack Foster. In 1990 Myron H. was fully restored and is the primary engine used today at Cedar Point.

=== Engine #4 "George R." ===
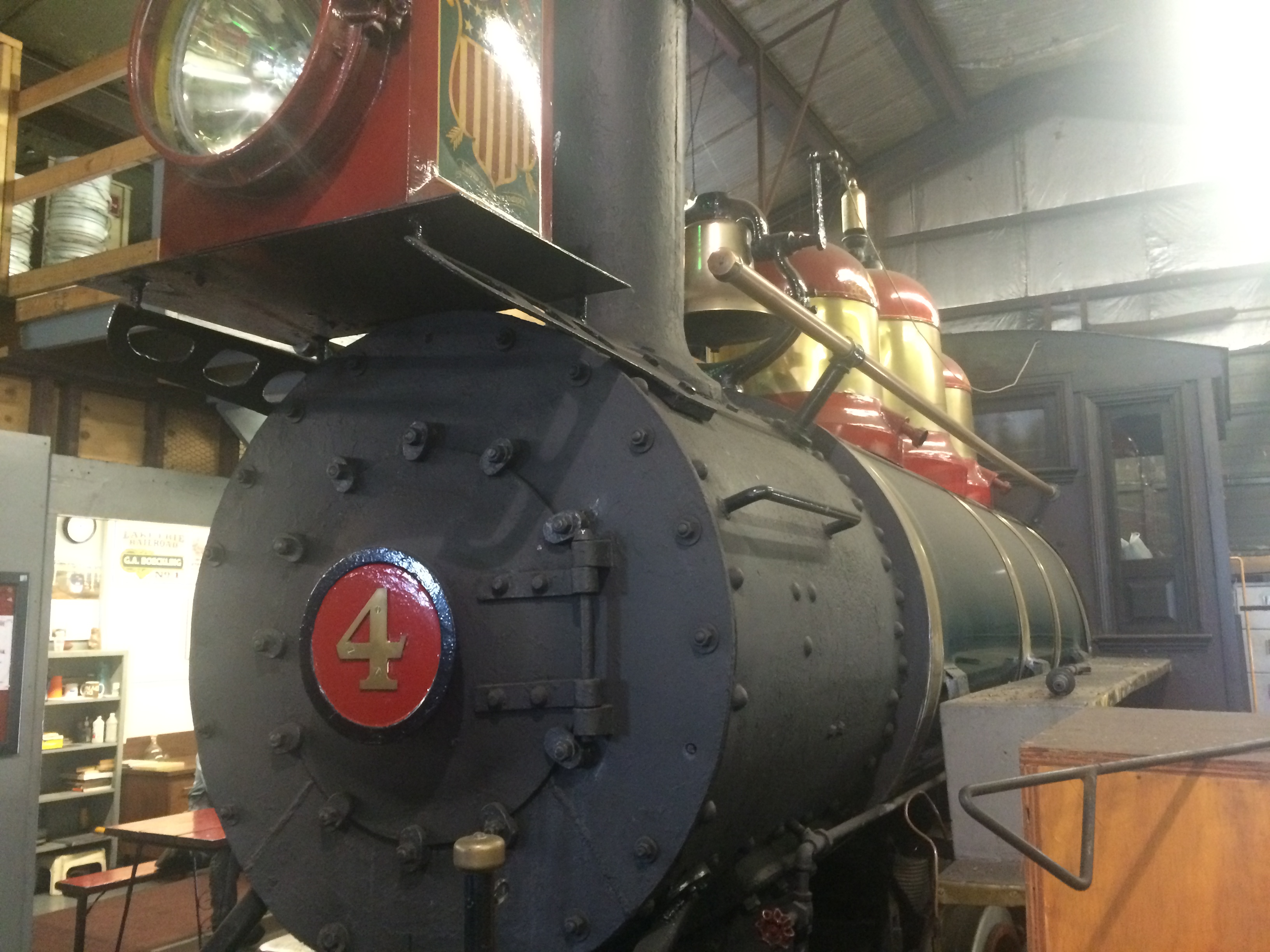
The George R. steam locomotive

Engine #4, nicknamed the "George R.", was built by the H.K. Porter, Inc. of Pittsburgh, Pennsylvania in March 1942 as construction number 7348 for the Carbon Limestone Company in Hillsville, Pennsylvania to haul limestone. It was sold to American Railroad Equipment Association in 1962 and leased to Cherokee Wonderland in Cherokee, North Carolina until it was sold to Cedar Point in 1964. The Carbon Limestone engines were unusual in having been built to 3 ft 2 in (965 mm) gauge instead of the more common 3 ft (914 mm) gauge, making it necessary to narrow the engine by two inches during a restoration by Cedar Point.

=== Engine #1 "Randol D." ===
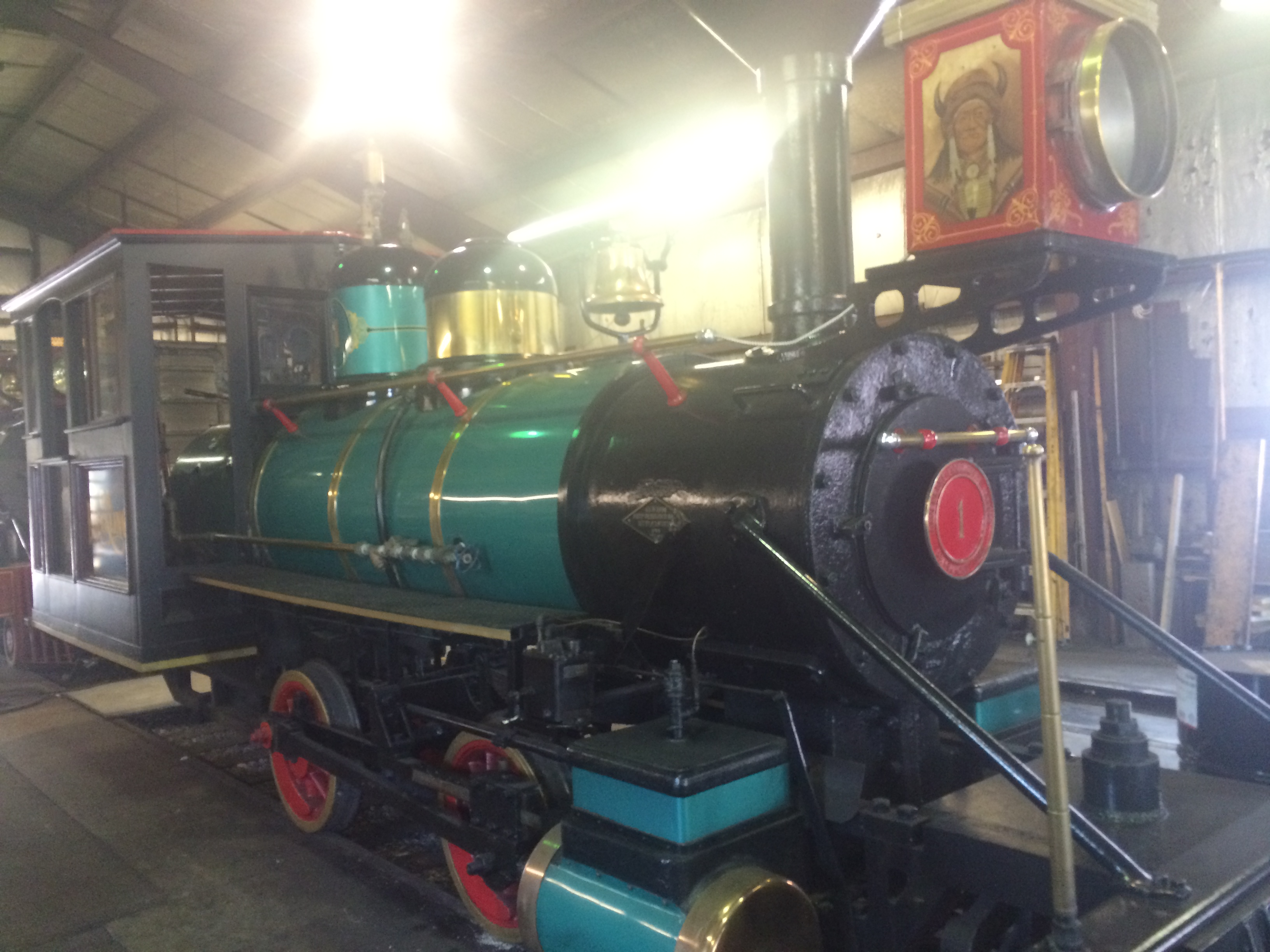
The G.A. Boeckling (later the Randol D.) steam locomotive

Engine #1, nicknamed the Randol D., was built by the Davenport Locomotive Works in Davenport, Iowa in July 1927 as construction number 2081 for N&S Coal Company in Pittsburg, Kansas. It was later sold to the Mackie Clemens Fuel Company in Mulberry, Kansas. In 1977, it was acquired by the Keystone Light Railway Company in Herminie, Pennsylvania. The engine was later restored as a 2-4-4T for Marriott Corporation's Great America amusement park in Gurnee, Illinois. While the engine was delivered to the park in 1980, it was stored behind the park's enginehouse in its shipping crate and never used. Marriott attempted to sell it around 1983 for US$90,000 (equivalent to $290,929 in 2025), but it did not sell and was a part of the sale of the park to Six Flags in May 1984.

By 1991, it had been restored for Bill Norred, who was planning a Victorian village in Southern California. Norred traded it to Disney for five of the original 1955 Santa Fe & Disneyland Railroad closed coaches (part of the Retlaw 1 passenger train), which had been out of service for nearly twenty years. The engine was too large for Disneyland, and was sent to Walt Disney World where it was named after Ward Kimball. It was placed on display at Epcot before being traded to Cedar Point in 1999 from Walt Disney World for the Maud L., one of the Cedar Point & Lake Erie Railroad original engines running since 1963. The engine sat in the back of the engine house for years and was finally sent to Knott's Berry Farm in California to be restored in 2010. In late 2011 it returned to Cedar Point and was run in late August that year after being converted to a 2-4-0 type tender engine by the CP&LE RR crews. In 2013 for Cedar Point & Lake Erie Railroads 50th Anniversary the "Davenport" (which was its nickname until it got a name) was renamed G.A. Boeckling, after one of Cedar Point's previous owners, George Arthur Boeckling. Meanwhile, the former Maud L. of the CP&LE RR was restored to service in 2005 at Disneyland, where it operates as the new Ward Kimball, locomotive #5 of the Disneyland Railroad.

Before the 2026 season, the locomotive was renamed the Randol D. in honor of former CP&LE worker Randol Catri, who died in 2025, and his wife.

=== Engine #3 "Albert" ===
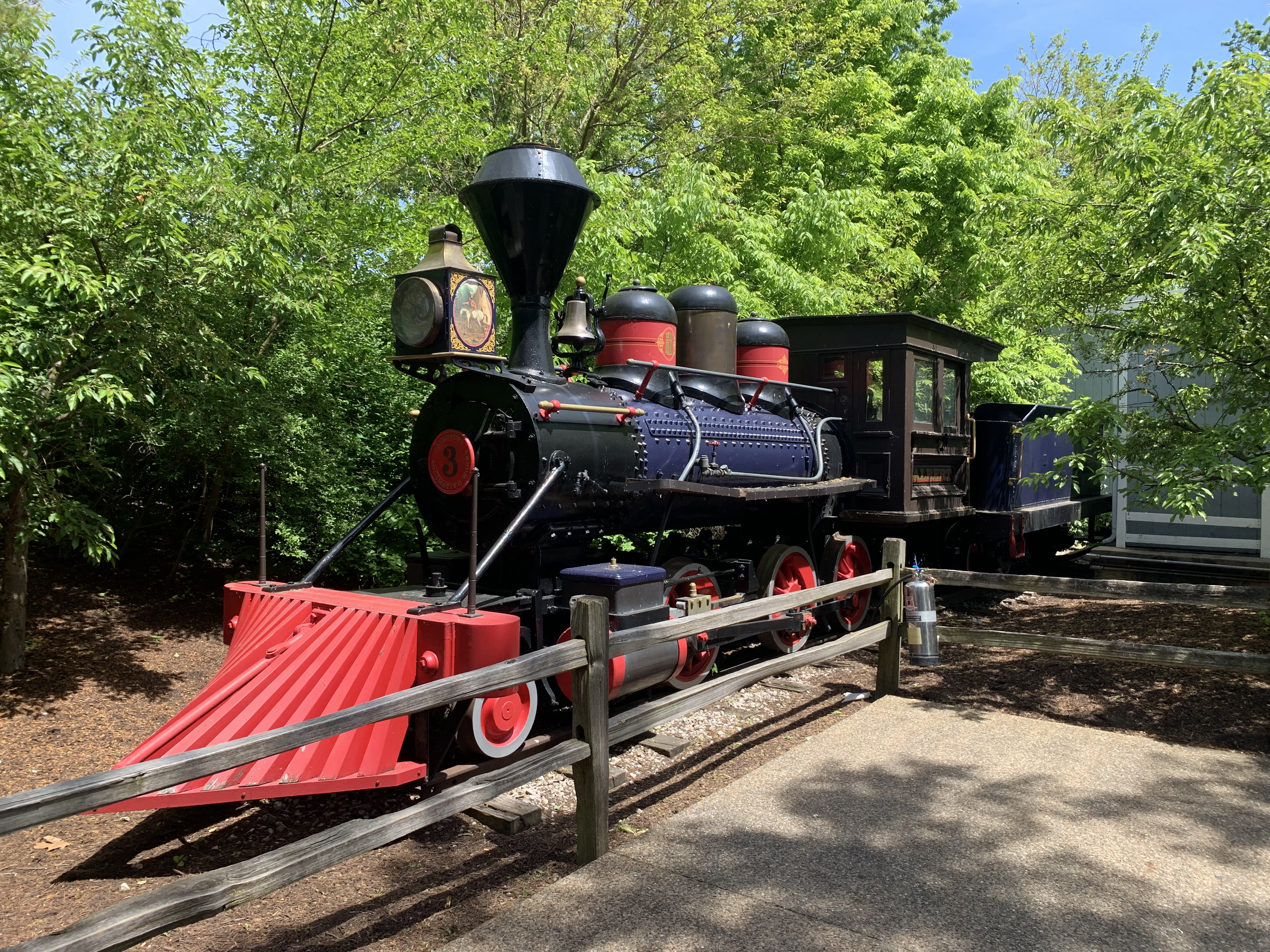
Albert, a retired engine, is on display along the Frontier Trail near Millennium Force.

Engine #3, nicknamed the Albert, was built by the Davenport Locomotive Works in Davenport, Iowa in September 1910 as construction number 1042 to haul sugar cane at the J.B. Levert-St.John Plantation in St. Martinville, Louisiana. It was given the name Albert while at the plantation. It is a 2-6-0 type tender engine. The Albert was sold in 1959 to the Sutton Junk and Salvage Company in New Iberia, Louisiana and then sold in 1960 to the American Railroad Equipment Association, which had built a series of tourist railroads. It was restored using the last replacement boiler built before Davenport ceased manufacturing locomotives. Albert ran a few seasons at the Cherokee Wonderland tourist railroad in Cherokee, North Carolina. It was pictured in Ron Ziel's book Twilight of Steam Locomotives while at Cherokee. The engine was sold to Cedar Point in 1963 and remained in service until its official retirement after the Myron H. returned to service in 1991. It is currently on display in a pavilion across from Millennium Force. Whether or not it will run again is currently uncertain.

=== Engine #7 "Little Engine" ===
Engine #7, nicknamed the Little Engine, was built by the Plymouth Locomotive Works between the late 1960s and early 1970s for Cedar Point. It was custom ordered by the park and designed to look like a steam locomotive. The park bought the engine for a basket of tickets that allowed Plymouth Locomotive Works employees to spend a day at the park. It is based on the small 0-4-0 mining locomotives that Plymouth was known for building, with a straight 4 gasoline engine that has a 4 speed forward and reverse transmission. It is used by the Cedar Point & Lake Erie Railroad for moving engines and empty coaches around the shop and railyard. The engine is also used for track work and maintenance.

== Stations ==
There are currently two stations, the Main Station in Celebration Plaza and the Frontier Town Station in Frontier Town.

=== Main Station ===
The Main Station (also known as the Funway Station) is the first station on the line and serves as the main station for the Railroad, and is located in the center of Cedar Point next to the engine house and yard. When the station originally opened and the railroad charged admission, tickets were sold in the front windows. Since tickets are no longer needed to ride, the front half of the station is now storage. The building was moved before the 1970 season and placed closer to the tracks. "It was moved to its present-day location to make way for the Million Dollar Midway. As a result, the track length was shortened a bit." The main station is located near the Rougarou and Millenium Force.

=== Frontier Town Station ===
The Frontier Town Station is located in the back of Cedar Point in front of Steel Vengeance, and next to the Maverick. "Frontier Town Station started off much smaller than its present size. It contained just a few structures like a saloon, some games, and one major ride which was the Shoot-The-Rapids water ride." At one time this station was one of only two ways to enter Frontier Town. What made Frontier Town unlike any other themed land in any other park was its location. The site of Frontier Town was carved out of a heavily forested area on the western tip of the Cedar Point Peninsula, far away from the main Midway. The station building itself is not very large and does not resemble a traditional train station.

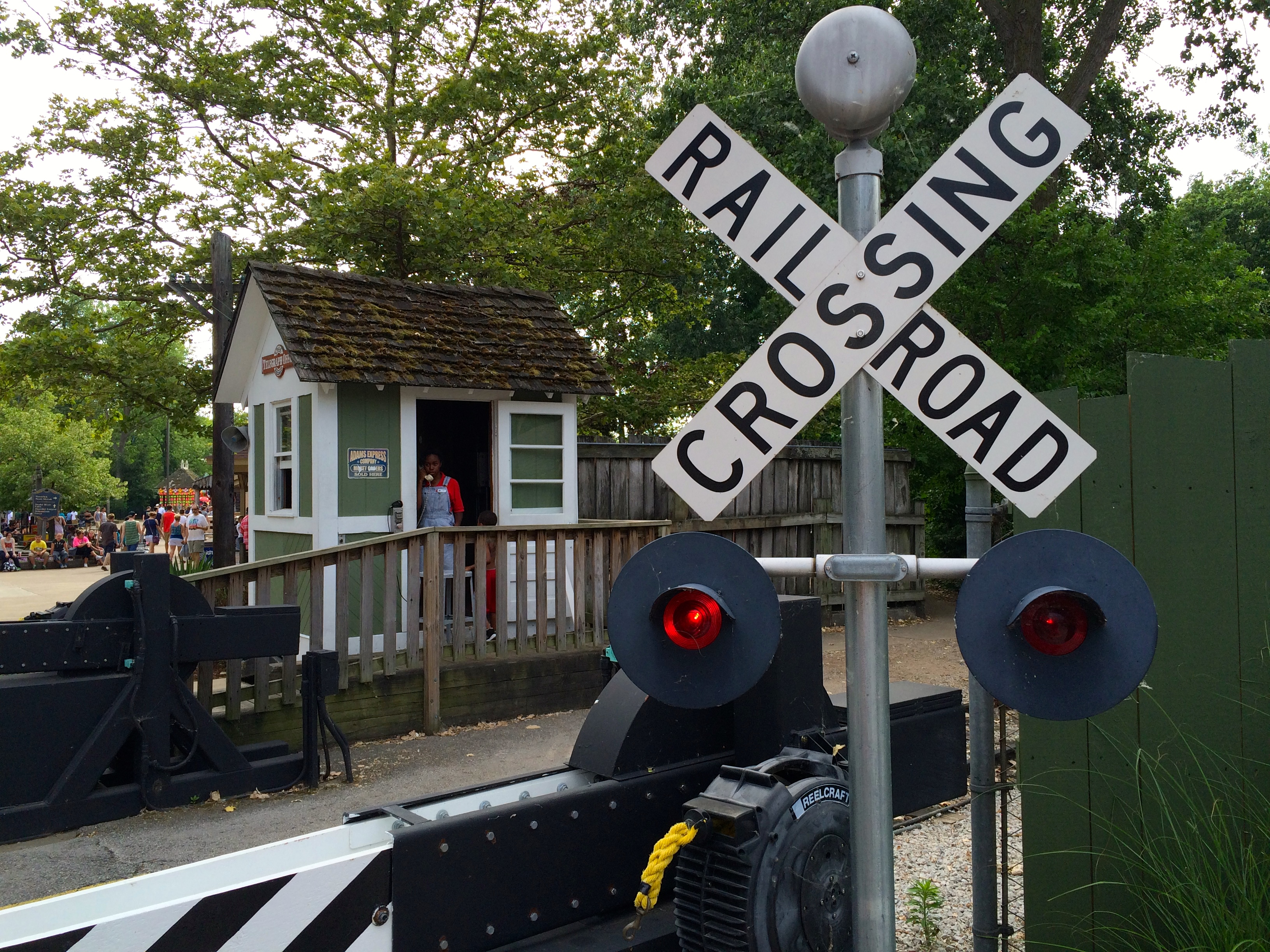
A grade crossing at Gemini Midway

== Grade crossings ==
The Cedar Point & Lake Erie Railroad utilizes nine grade crossings. According to Merriam-Webster a grade crossing is, "a crossing of highways, railroad tracks, or combinations of these on the same level." Four of these are used by park guests and contain gates, lights, and bells to warn guests of an approaching train and to provide a safe barrier preventing guests from reaching the train. There is a train ride that is a tour throughout Cedar Point, and they have crossings that warn guests as the gates go down. The remaining grade crossings all have stop signs and several have flashing lights, to warn approaching vehicles and pedestrians of oncoming trains.

== Boneville ==
Boneville is a western themed fictional town along the rails that is home to 52 mostly animatronic skeletons depicted as going about life in the American frontier. Activities depicted include a shootout, going to school, a fire, and workers singing while they are doing maintenance on the railroad. "The ghost town known as Boneville, is the first scene after leaving Frontier Town. This is the only original scene that hasn't been moved." Boneville had a music hall which was located where Billy Bob's Sawmill is today. It had three skeleton band members playing instruments on the balcony, and below a billiard room.

== See also ==
- Kings Island & Miami Valley Railroad
- Rail transport in Walt Disney Parks and Resorts
