= Fury 325 =

Steel roller coaster at Carowinds

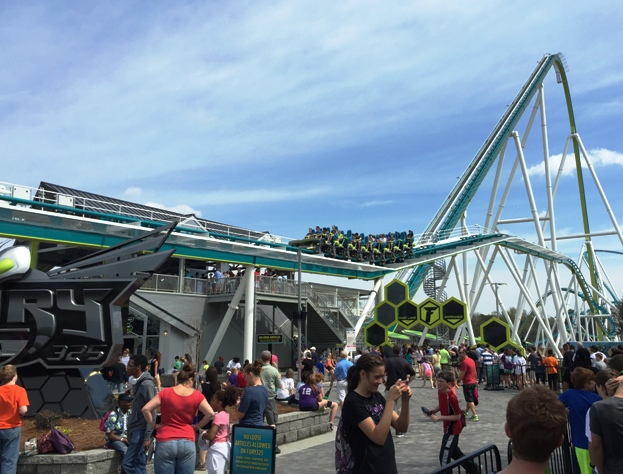
- Fury 325's entrance plaza

Carowinds
- Location: Carowinds
- Park section: Thrill Zone
- Coordinates: 35°06′20″N 80°56′33″W
- Status: Operating
- Soft opening date: March 25, 2015
- Opening date: March 28, 2015
- Cost: $30 million
- Replaced: Ripcord

General statistics
- Type: Steel
- Manufacturer: Bolliger & Mabillard
- Model: Hyper Coaster (Note: B&M's official website later categorized 300-foot installations, including Leviathan and Fury 325, under a dedicated "Giga Coaster" section, but they were developed as part of the Hyper Coaster model line.)
- Lift/launch system: Chain lift hill
- Height: 325 ft (99 m)
- Drop: 320 ft (98 m)
- Length: 6,602 ft (2,012 m)
- Speed: 95 mph (153 km/h)
- Inversions: 0
- Max vertical angle: 81°
- Capacity: 1470 riders per hour
- Height restriction: 54 in (137 cm)
- Trains: 3 trains with 8 cars; riders arranged 4 across in a single row for a total of 32 riders per train
- Fast Lane available
- Fury 325 at RCDB

Video
- POV video of Fury 325

Fury 325 is a steel roller coaster located at Carowinds amusement park in Charlotte, North Carolina, United States. The Hyper Coaster model from Bolliger & Mabillard opened as the world's tallest giga coaster on March 28, 2015. It features 6,602 feet (2,012 m) of track and a maximum height of 325 feet (99 m), making it the fourth-tallest roller coaster in the world and the tallest overall that uses a traditional lift hill. The ride reaches a maximum speed of 95 mph (153 km/h), winding through high-speed curves, passing both under and over the park's main entrance.

Fury 325 was the Best New Ride of 2015 in the annual Golden Ticket Awards published by Amusement Today, and since 2016, it has consistently ranked as the world's best steel coaster in the same annual publication. A structural issue involving a steel support column was identified in summer 2023, prompting an extended closure for investigation and repairs.

== History ==
In September 2013, the Charlotte City Council discussed plans for a proposed roller coaster in one of its meetings. It was revealed that the ride would cost approximately $30 million and would stand 70 feet (21 m) taller than the park's 232-foot (71 m) Intimidator roller coaster, indicating it would exceed 300 feet (91 m) in height. Cedar Fair, which owned Carowinds, filed trademark applications for the names Centurion, Fury, and Fury 325 on October 18, 2013, January 23, 2014, and June 9, 2014, respectively. The Centurion trademark was suspended in February 2014 after another trademark application using the same name was discovered by the United States Patent and Trademark Office.

In early August 2014, the park sent a beekeeper to several media outlets in the Charlotte area, delivering a partially burnt bug net with a card reading, "you're gonna need a much bigger net to capture the thrills of the 2015 Carowinds season". The original intended name, Centurion, appeared in marketing materials on a microsite within Carowinds' website the following week. The updated name, Fury 325, was revealed for the hornet-themed coaster at an event held at the park's Harmony Hall Marketplace on August 21, 2014. A similar hoax was conducted by Kings Island leading up to the announcement of Banshee in 2013.

The August reveal specified that Bolliger & Mabillard (B&M) would design and construct Fury 325. By early October, the first piece of track along with the structure for the storage track were both erected. The brake run was completed by late October. Over the next two months, much of the track, including the lift hill and first drop, were completed. The final piece of Fury 325's track was installed on January 30, 2015. First test runs commenced in March 2015, which was followed by the coaster's media day on March 25. The ride officially debuted for the park's season opening on March 28, 2015.

=== Incidents ===
On June 30, 2023, a park bystander recording video footage from the parking lot spotted a large crack in one of Fury 325's support pillars. The video footage showed the top of the pillar briefly separating from its support column as a coaster train passed by. The ride was shut down later that day, and it remained closed for more than a month pending an investigation by the North Carolina Department of Labor and the replacement of the pillar.

A thorough inspection was also conducted by the park and the ride's manufacturer, B&M, which concluded that the fracture occurred along the weld line of the support column. It was also determined that "unidirectional bending fatigue" was to blame for the fracture, and early indications of the crack formation could be seen in photos taken days earlier. Additional cracks were also discovered and repaired. The issues led to the park enhancing its safety inspection procedures, including the use of drones for "hard-to-reach areas". A new support column was installed in mid-July, and Fury 325 reopened to the public on August 10, 2023.

Another less severe incident occurred on July 7, 2026, after Carowinds discovered an issue with one of the ride's foundations during a routine maintenance inspection. The park released a statement noting, "While the issue did not impact guest safety, we initiated a series of corrective measures out of an abundance of caution." Fury 325 reopened two weeks later on July 21.

== Ride description ==
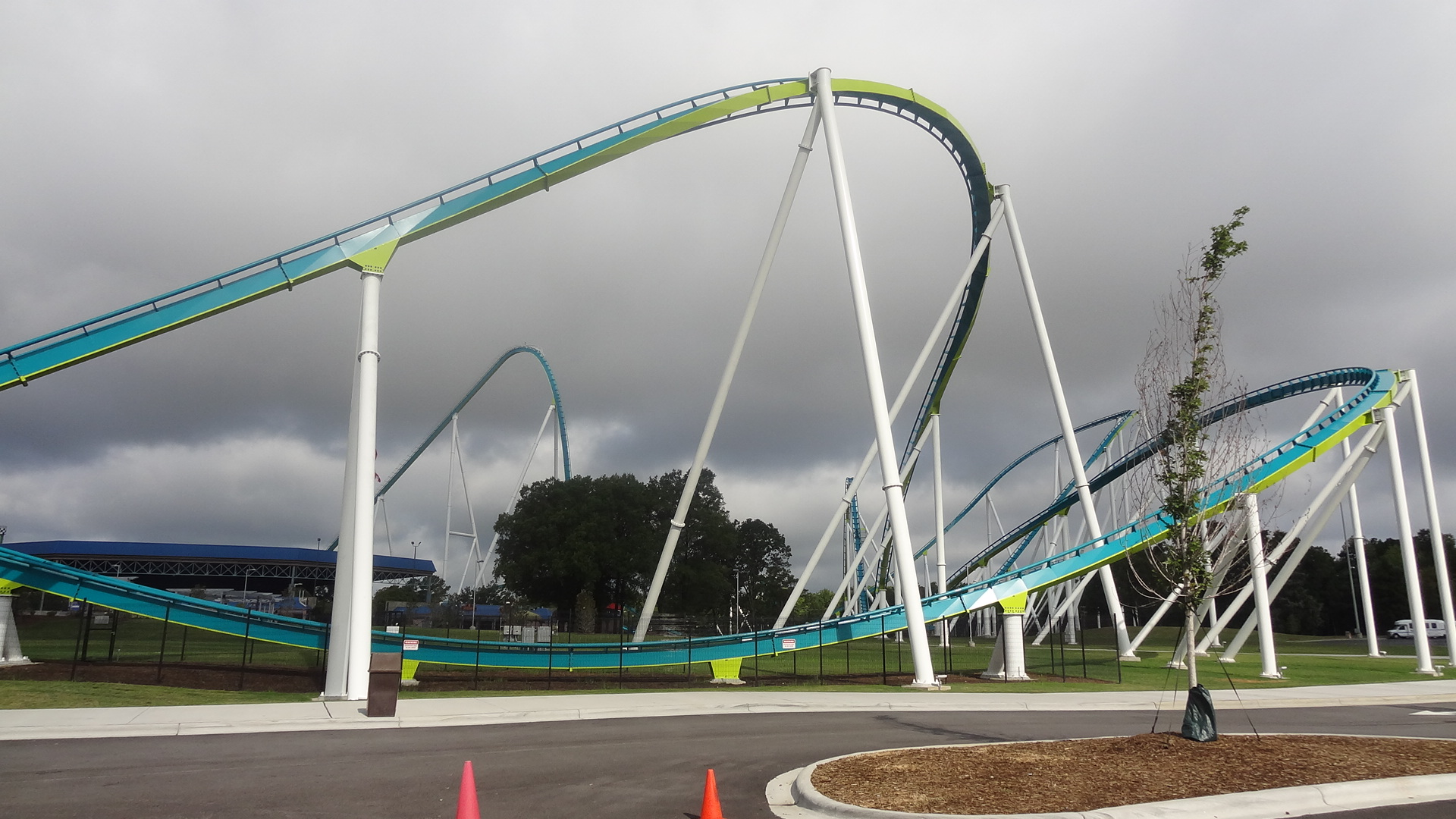
Partial view of Fury 325's layout

Once riders are loaded and secured, the train dispatches from the station, passes over the transfer track, and begins climbing the 325-foot (99 m) chain lift hill. The humming sound of a hornet is played twice during the ascent – once at the beginning and a second time after a ride safety announcement. After reaching the top, the train enters its largest drop of 320 feet (98 m) at an 81-degree angle, accelerating up to 95 mph (153 km/h). This is followed by a 190-foot-high (58 m) barrel turn, into a high speed s-curve that crosses the North Carolina and South Carolina state line. After passing over the park's north entrance, the train makes a banked turn to the left that leads into a 91-degree overbanked horseshoe turn 157 feet (48 m) off the ground.

The train then dips down, passing under the entrance pathway and through several illuminated hexagons – an element the park refers to as the "hive dive". This is followed by a second banked turn to the left at a height of 101 feet (31 m), which crosses the state line once again. After a straight section of track, the train travels over a 111-foot (34 m) camelback hill. It finishes with the track's finale – a double helix carousel and a pair of camelback hills – before entering the final brake run and returning to the station. According to Carowinds, one complete cycle of the ride was designed to last 3 minutes and 25 seconds.

=== Track and trains ===
A train diving into the tunnel underneath the north park entrance

Fury 325 features a track length of 6,602 feet (2,012 m) and a lift hill that stands 325 feet tall (99 m). Due to the ride's height and proximity to Charlotte Douglas International Airport, the park had to receive approval from the Federal Aviation Administration to build the attraction. The track is mostly teal with a lime-green bottom, while the supports are white. The color scheme required 3,400 U.S. gallons (13,000 L; 2,800 imp gal) of paint, and the total weight of the track is approximately 2,700 metric tons (3,000 short tons). The roller coaster occupies approximately 8.4 acres (3.4 ha) of land.

The ride operates with three open-air, steel and fiberglass trains, each containing eight cars. Riders are seated in teal-colored seats and secured by lime-green lap bars. The front of each train is either silver, dark grey, or black and features the ride's logo. There is a single row of four riders per car for a total of 32 riders per train. Every seat has its own "clamshell" lap bar restraint and seat belt. This configuration supports a theoretical capacity of 1,470 riders per hour.

=== Theming ===
Fury 325 is a hornet-themed roller coaster, which takes its inspiration from the city's moniker during the American Revolution, when Charlotte was called "a hornet's nest of rebellion". Carowinds likened the intensity of the coaster's layout to "an angry hornet chasing its target". Although its teal track matches one of the Charlotte Hornets NBA team colors, Carowinds did not make a direct connection between the two. The NBA team was previously named the Charlotte Bobcats, but the team's original name Charlotte Hornets was restored the previous year in 2014.

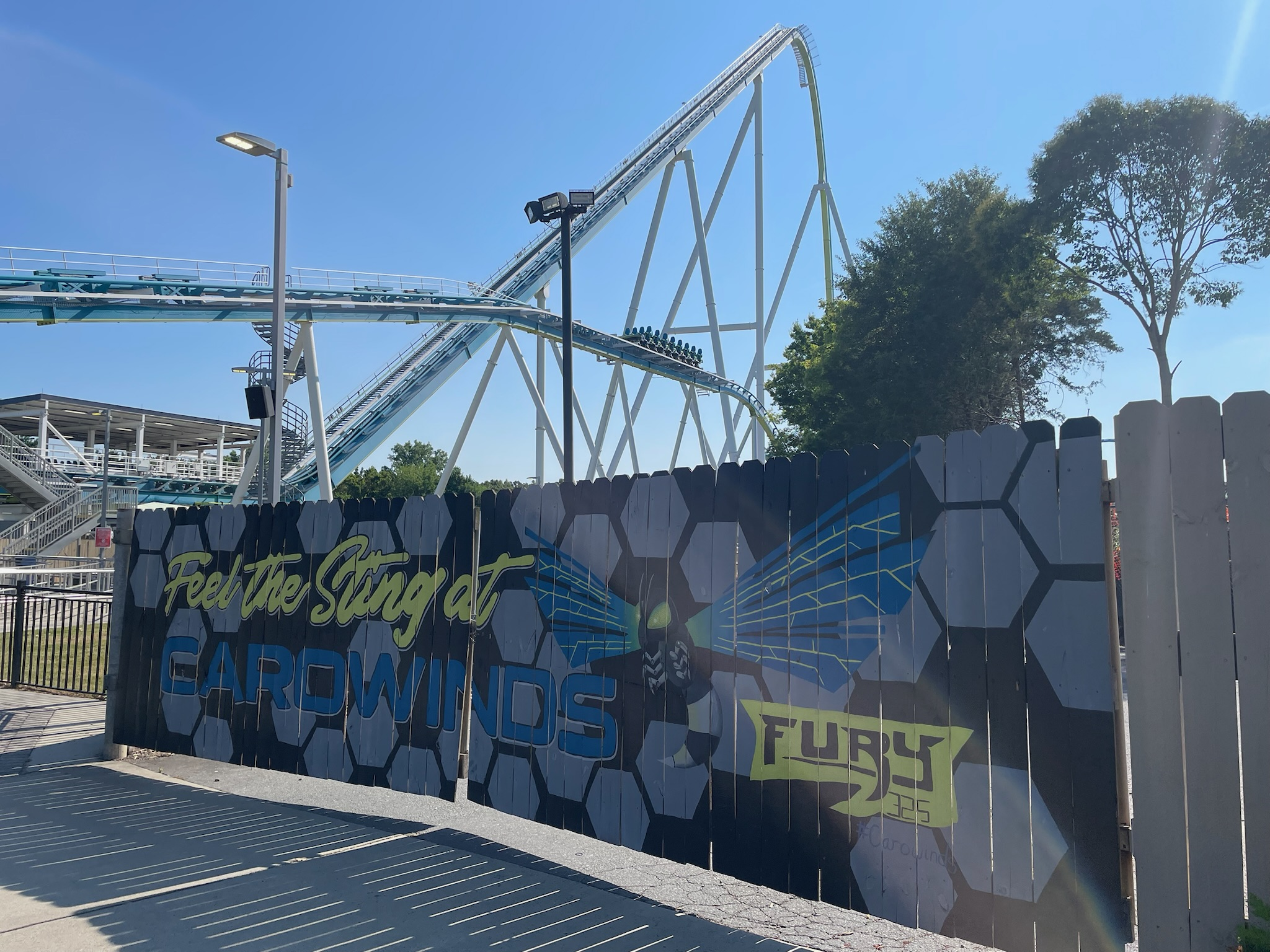
The painted fence on the right side of Fury 325's entrance.

The entrance plaza that precedes the line queue features various decorations themed to the ride. A large Fury 325 logo can be seen on the left side. The sign displays a small, hexagon-patterned base below the main logo. At night, the sign lights up with neon colors. Riders exiting the ride pass through a small souvenir shop, and an on-ride camera booth is stationed behind it. A large Golden Ticket Award sign, added sometime after opening, is located here as well. A painted fence sits on the ride side of the entrance.

The plaza leads into Fury 325's main entrance. There are two queues: a standard queue and a Fast Lane queue. The entrance also features 10 hexagons on the sign that forms an archway, and the sign is illuminated at night. Guests have access to a test seat on the right side of the entrance.

== Records ==
Fury 325 set new records and came close to breaking others when it opened in 2015. It became the world's tallest giga coaster – a roller coaster that exceeds 300 feet (91 m) in height – surpassing Steel Dragon 2000 at Nagashima Spa Land by 6.7 feet (2.0 m). Its maximum speed of 95 mph (153 km/h) ties it with Steel Dragon 2000 for being the fastest among roller coasters with a traditional lift hill. As of 2024, Fury 325 is the fifth-tallest and fourth-longest steel roller coaster in the world, and it is tied as sixth-fastest. In North American rankings, the roller coaster is the tallest, fastest, and longest among non-launched, steel roller coasters.

Fury 325 is also the tallest roller coaster to be built by Bolliger & Mabillard, following on the heels of the company's first giga coaster, Leviathan at Canada's Wonderland; it opened in 2012. Leviathan reaches a maximum height of 306 feet (93 m).

== Reception ==
Initial reception following the announcement of the ride was positive. Chip Sieczko, a representative from American Coaster Enthusiasts, said, "This is not a Carolina story, this is not a national story. This is an international deal. It's going to be insane." Arthur Levine from About.com (now Dotdash Meredith) stated that the roller coaster will make an impression at the front of the park. In 2024, a reviewer for Chicago television station WGN-TV said: "Fury isn't tucked away in the back of the park, it's front and center, daring and enticing guests to take it for a ride." He praised the airtime hills, the underpass beneath the entrance pathway, and the banked turns, saying that the ride had an appropriate name.

=== Awards ===
Fury 325 was awarded Best New Ride in the 2015 Golden Ticket Awards (GTA) published annually by Amusement Today, and it ranked fourth overall among steel coasters. The following year, it ranked first overall in the same publication, and it has retained the top position ever since.

Golden Ticket Awards: Top steel Roller Coasters
Year									1998	1999
Ranking									–	–
Year	2000	2001	2002	2003	2004	2005	2006	2007	2008	2009
Ranking	–	–	–	–	–	–	–	–	–	–
Year	2010	2011	2012	2013	2014	2015	2016	2017	2018	2019
Ranking	–	–	–	–	–	4	1	1	1	1
Year	2020	2021	2022	2023	2024	2025	2026			
Ranking	N/A	1	1	1	1	1	1			

== See also ==
- Incidents at Carowinds
