= Steel Dragon 2000 =

Steel roller coaster in Japan

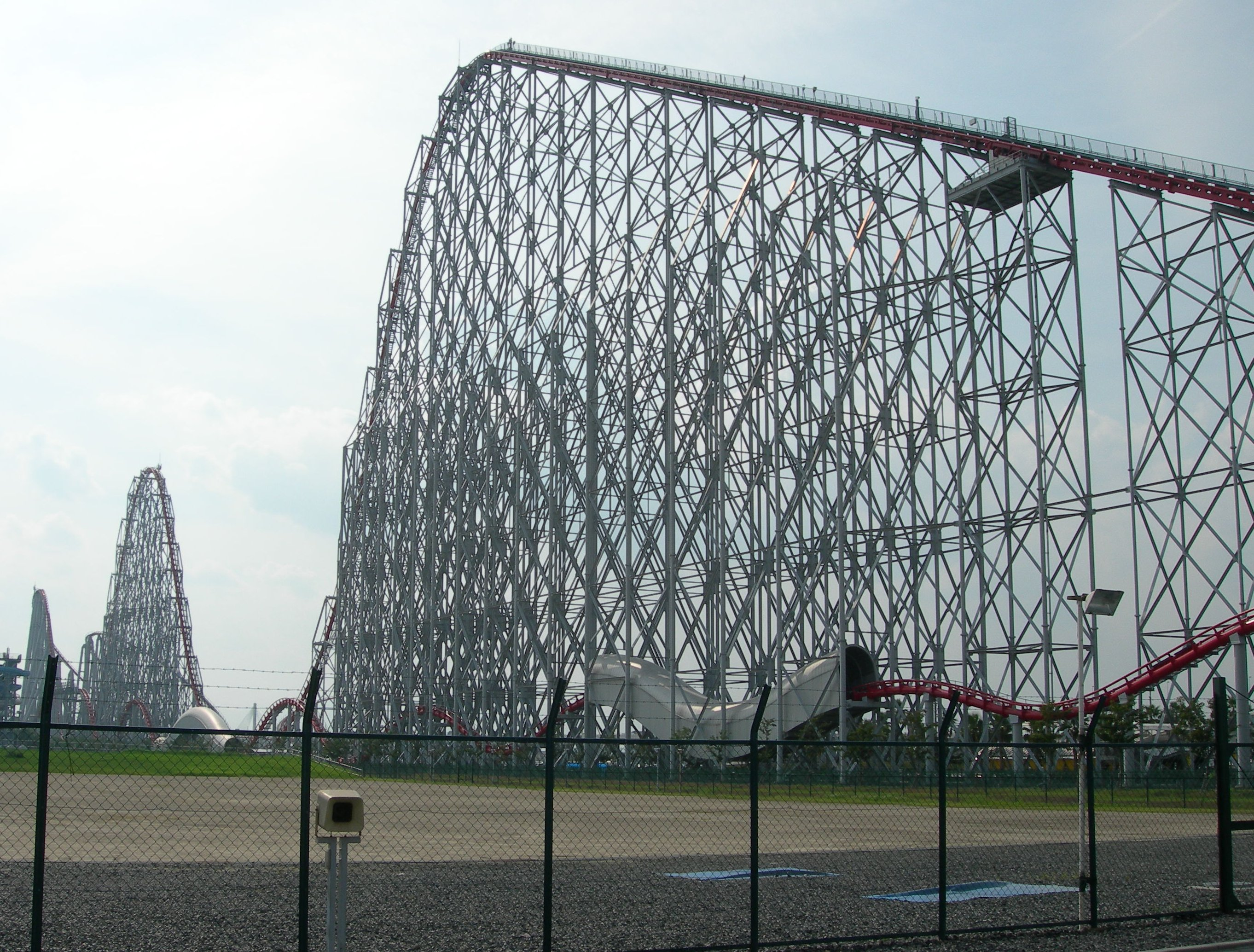
- The ride's 97-meter lift hill and the first few camelback hills

Nagashima Spa Land
- Location: Nagashima Spa Land
- Coordinates: 35°01′52″N 136°43′48″E
- Status: Operating
- Opening date: 1 August 2000
- Cost: 7,888,114,000 yen

General statistics
- Type: Steel
- Manufacturer: D. H. Morgan Manufacturing
- Designer: Steve Okamoto
- Track layout: Out and back
- Lift/launch system: Chain lift hill
- Height: 97 m (318 ft)
- Drop: 93.5 m (307 ft)
- Length: 2,479 m (8,133 ft)
- Speed: 152.9 km/h (95.0 mph)
- Inversions: 0
- Duration: 4:00
- Max vertical angle: 68°
- G-force: 3.5
- Height restriction: 140–185 cm (4 ft 7 in – 6 ft 1 in)
- Trains: Unknown number of trains with 7 cars; riders arranged 2 across in 2 rows for a total of 28 riders per train
- Trains built by: Bolliger & Mabillard
- Steel Dragon 2000 at RCDB

Steel Dragon 2000 (スチールドラゴン2000, Suchīru Doragon Nisen) is a steel roller coaster located at Nagashima Spa Land amusement park in Mie Prefecture, Japan.

Built by D. H. Morgan Manufacturing, Steel Dragon 2000 opened to the public on 1 August 2000. Its name derives from Chinese astrology and zodiac calendars in which the year 2000 represented the dragon. It broke several world records upon its debut, becoming the longest roller coaster in the world with a track length of 2,479 metres (8,133 ft), as well as the tallest and fastest complete-circuit coaster. Although its height and speed records were broken relatively quickly after its debut, it remained the longest coaster in the world until that record was broken in 2025 by Falcons Flight. With a maximum speed of 153 km/h (95 mph), it is tied with Fury 325 for being the fastest coaster featuring a lift hill.

== History ==
In November 1999, Nagashima Spa Land announced that they would be building Steel Dragon 2000. It would be the second giga coaster to be built, following Millennium Force at Cedar Point. Steel Dragon 2000 officially opened to the general public on 1 August 2000.

The ride originally featured trains built by D. H. Morgan. In 2013, Steel Dragon 2000 received new trains from Bolliger & Mabillard.

== Layout ==
Out of the station, the track makes a right hand turn onto the lift hill. Due to the length of the lift hill, it utilizes two chains with separate motors. At the crest of the lift hill, the track plummets down a 94 metres (308 ft) drop to the ground, before passing over a 77 metres (253 ft) tall airtime hill. After this hill, the track rises over a 64 metres (210 ft) tall hill before dropping to the right into a pair of helixes, the first one being clockwise and the second being counterclockwise. Following the second helix, the track maneuvers through the supports of the first helix and third hill and makes a left turn into the midcourse brakes, which start the return trip. The return trip consists of a series of airtime hills, running parallel to the outbound track, before hitting the final brake run next to the base of the lift hill. From the brake run, trains pass through the transfer track and storage area before making a sweeping left turn to return to the station.

== Design ==
Much more steel was used to build Steel Dragon 2000 than most other roller coasters. This was to ensure the coaster was protected from earthquakes. The extra steel was a large part of the reason the coaster cost over JP¥7 billion to build (around $61,550,000 in 2000 US dollars). The ride also includes two tunnels.

== Records ==
- Fifth tallest steel roller coaster in the world at 97 metres (318 ft) tall. It is behind Falcons Flight, Top Thrill 2, Red Force, and Fury 325.
- Sixth longest roller coaster drop at 93.5 metres (307 ft).
- Second longest roller coaster at 2,479 metres (8,133 ft).

== 2003 incident ==
Steel Dragon 2000 accident
- Date: August 23, 2003; 23 years ago
- Type: Wheel loss
- Outcome: Ride closed until 2006
- Deaths: 0
- Injuries: 2

On 23 August 2003, a sheared axle caused one of the trains to lose a wheel. A passenger suffered a serious back injury and a 28-year-old man swimming in the water park pool was injured when he was hit in the hip with the 32 centimetres (13 in) wheel. The ride was closed for over three years and reopened on 3 September 2006.

== Awards ==
Golden Ticket Awards: Top steel Roller Coasters
Year									1998	1999
Ranking									–	–
Year	2000	2001	2002	2003	2004	2005	2006	2007	2008	2009
Ranking	–	–	–	–	–	–	–	–	–	–
Year	2010	2011	2012	2013	2014	2015	2016	2017	2018	2019
Ranking	–	–	–	–	–	–	–	–	–	20
Year	2020	2021	2022	2023	2024	2025	2026			
Ranking	N/A	35	46	43 (tie)	–	–	–			

Preceded by Millennium Force	World's Tallest Complete Circuit Roller Coaster; August 2000 – May 2003	Succeeded by Top Thrill 2 (formerly Top Thrill Dragster)
Preceded by Millennium Force	World's Fastest Complete Circuit Roller Coaster; August 2000 – December 2001	Succeeded by Dodonpa
Preceded by Daidarasaurus	World's Longest Roller Coaster; August 2000 – December 2025	Succeeded by Falcons Flight
