= Pantherian =

Steel roller coaster at Kings Dominion

- Previously known as Intimidator 305 (2010–2023) and Project 305 (2024)
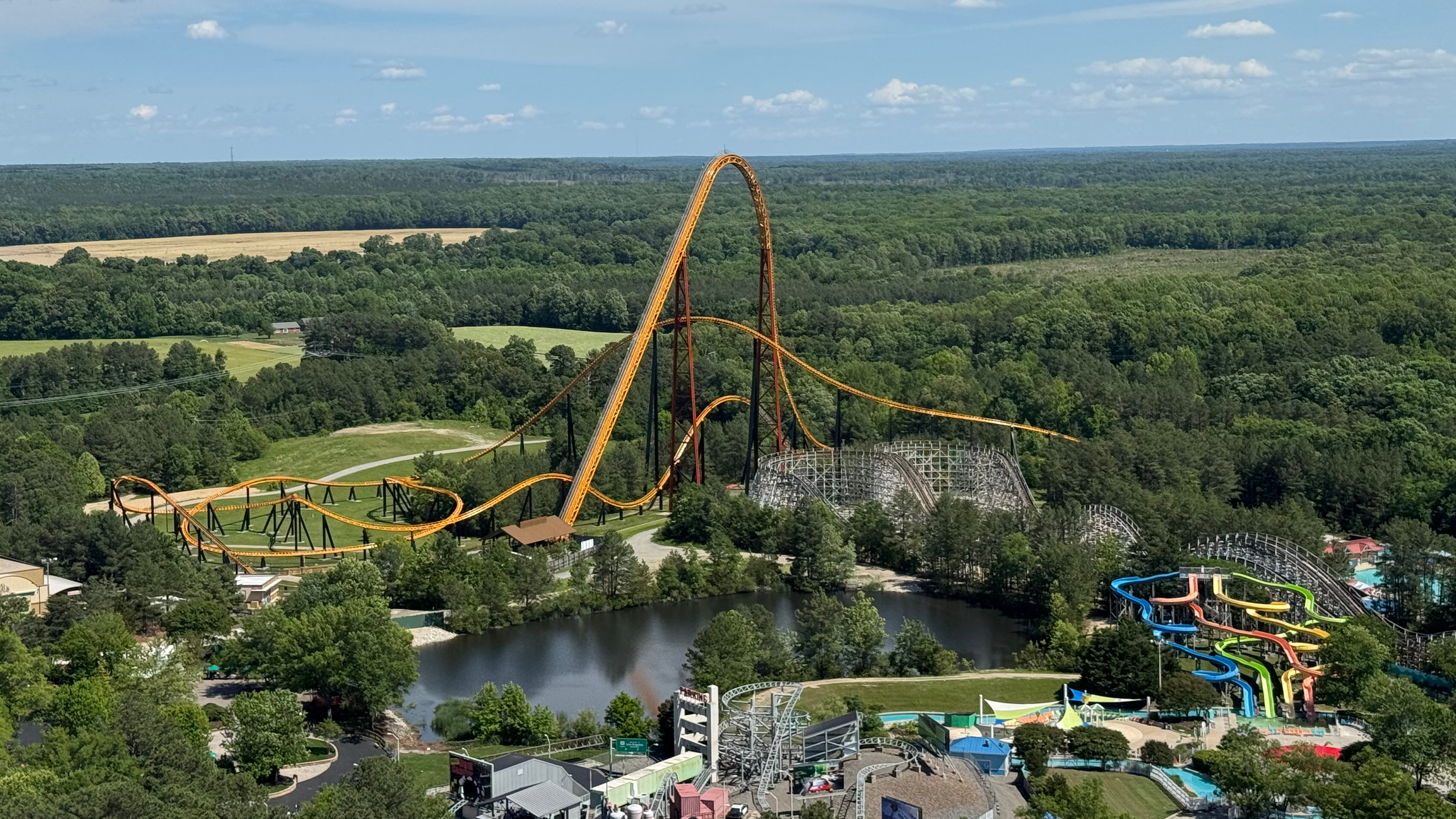
- Pantherian as seen from the Eiffel Tower in 2025

Kings Dominion
- Location: Kings Dominion
- Park section: Jungle X-Pedition
- Coordinates: 37°50′15″N 77°26′23″W
- Status: Operating
- Soft opening date: April 1, 2010
- Opening date: April 2, 2010
- Cost: $25 million

General statistics
- Type: Steel
- Manufacturer: Intamin
- Model: Giga Coaster
- Lift/launch system: Cable lift hill
- Height: 305 ft (93 m)
- Drop: 300 ft (91.4 m)
- Length: 5,100 ft (1,554 m)
- Speed: 90 mph (145 km/h)
- Inversions: 0
- Duration: 3:00
- Max vertical angle: 85°
- Capacity: 1,350 riders per hour
- Restraint style: Over-the-shoulder with seat belt
- Height restriction: 54–78 in (137–198 cm)
- Trains: 2 trains with 8 cars; riders arranged 2 across in 2 rows for a total of 32 riders per train
- Fast Lane available
- Pantherian at RCDB

Video

Pantherian (originally known as Intimidator 305 and temporarily named Project 305 for the 2024 season) is a steel roller coaster located at Kings Dominion in Doswell, Virginia, United States. The ride was manufactured by Intamin and opened to the public on April 2, 2010. Originally themed to racing, the coaster was originally named after the late NASCAR driver Dale Earnhardt, who was commonly known as "The Intimidator". It is located in the Jungle X-Pedition section of the park near Flight of Fear on the former site of the Safari Monorail ride. Standing at 305 feet (93 m) tall and reaching speeds up to 90 mph (145 km/h), it is the second giga coaster to be built in North America, following Millennium Force at Cedar Point. The $25 million investment was, at the time, the most expensive of any ride in park history. Pantherian was the 14th coaster to debut at the park.

Pantherian has a first drop of 300 feet (91 m), which reaches a maximum descent angle of 85 degrees. Its lift hill structure was unique at the time, utilizing only two main points of support at the hill's crest. At its highest point, Pantherian reaches a height greater than the observation platform of the park's tallest structure, the Eiffel Tower attraction.

Following Intimidator 305's first operating season, the first turn on the ride was extensively redesigned to reduce the number of greyouts and blackouts reportedly experienced by some riders. In early 2024, Kings Dominion temporarily renamed the coaster "Project 305" and announced that the ride was undergoing a transformation, likely due to expiring licensing rights to reference Dale Earnhardt and the Intimidator nickname for the ride. It began operation under the temporary name for the 2024 season. Later that year, Kings Dominion announced that the coaster would be rethemed and renamed "Pantherian".

== History ==
Kings Dominion announced plans on August 20, 2009, to build a new roller coaster called Intimidator 305 for the 2010 season. The new ride would be a Giga Coaster model from Liechtensteinian manufacturer Intamin exceeding 300 feet (91 m) in height. Its name would reference the late NASCAR racing legend Dale Earnhardt, who had been nicknamed the "Intimidator". Dale Earnhardt Incorporated CEO Jeff Steiner, Dale Earnhardt's daughter Taylor Earnhardt, and then Cedar Fair CEO Dick Kinzel were all in attendance of the press event, which was led by Kings Dominion's Director of Marketing Ed Kuhlmann. Animation videos of the ride as well as a working scale model were on display. The ride would be the 15th operating roller coaster at Kings Dominion.

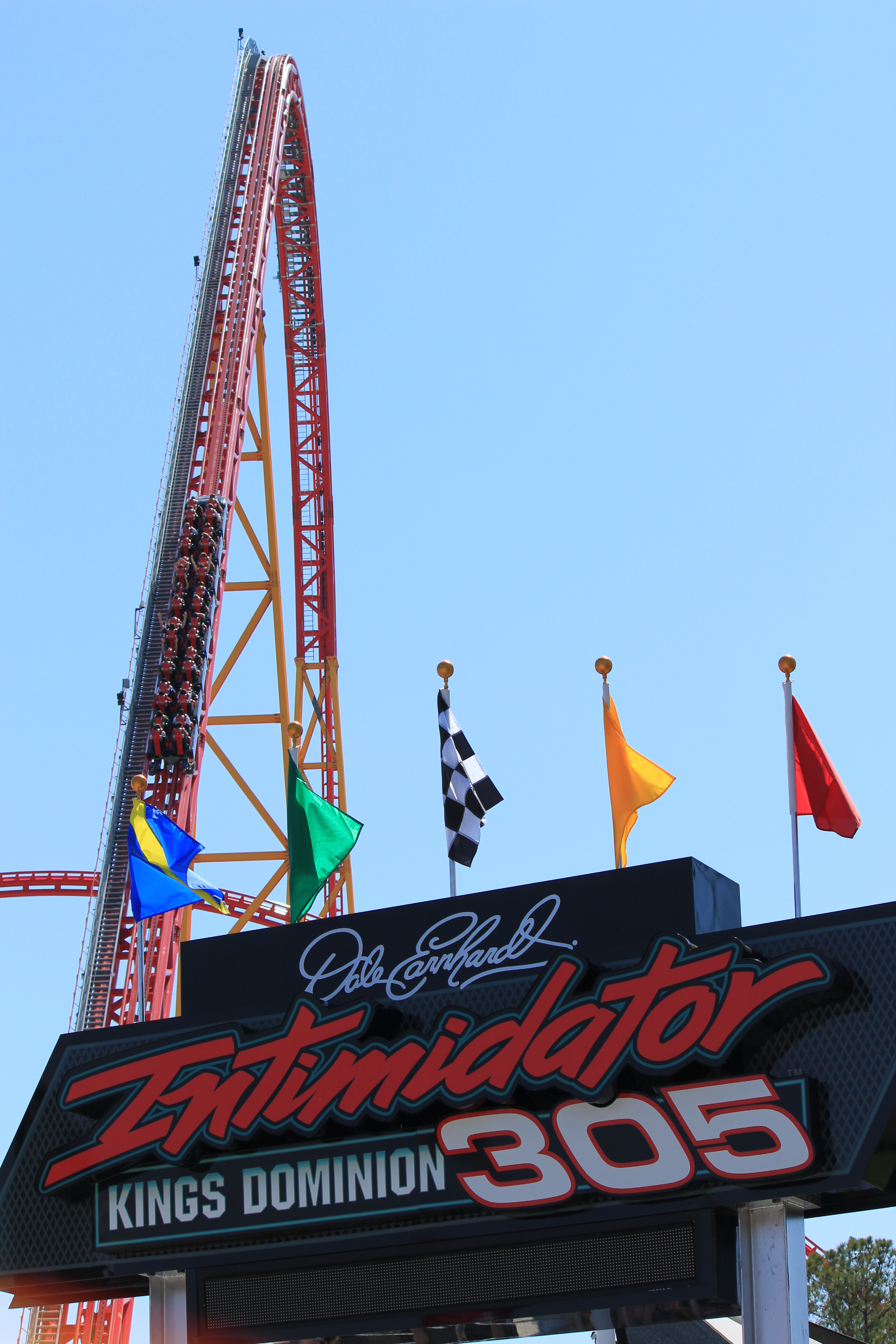
Lift hill with sign in foreground (2010)

The new coaster was built on the former land occupied by the Safari Monorail, which closed in 1993. Kings Dominion broke ground on June 1, 2009, with the first track pieces arriving several days later. On August 19, 2009, the first pieces of steel were put into place. The 305-foot (93 m) lift hill was topped off a few months later in November. Construction continued through the winter and completed on January 9, 2010. First test runs began on March 14, 2010, and Kings Dominion announced that the ride was complete two weeks later. Intimidator 305 had cost $25 million to construct.

Intimidator 305 was considered by amusement-park enthusiasts to be one of the most anticipated new roller coasters of 2010. A media preview event was held on April 1, 2010, and the ride opened the following day, when Kings Dominion opened for the season. The plaza near the ride's entrance featured Dale Earnhardt's black Monte Carlo on display, as well as commemorative plaques celebrating the famed driver's career. Intimidator 305 was one of two roller coasters themed to Earnhardt that opened in 2010; the other was Intimidator (now known as Thunder Striker), a hypercoaster manufactured by Bolliger & Mabillard at Carowinds, another Six Flags (then Cedar Fair) park. Kings Dominion officials hoped that the ride would attract guests, and the park recorded increased attendance during the 2010 season as a result.

=== Modifications ===
The ride originally ran at a top speed of 92 mph (148 km/h), which was achieved on the 270-degree right turn immediately after the first drop. Some riders experienced problems on that turn because of extremely high positive G-forces produced by the ride's original design. Riders reported symptoms of greying or blacking out, a brief loss of vision or consciousness depending on severity. To lower the number of occurrences, Kings Dominion reduced the coaster's maximum speed by temporarily installing trim brakes on the first drop. During the following off-season, the coaster's first turn was redesigned, resulting in a wider turn radius and fewer G-forces. The major modification allowed them to remove the trim brakes on the first drop, returning the ride to its original maximum speed of 90 mph (145 km/h).

In 2024, Kings Dominion and Carowinds began removing all licensed theming related to Dale Earnhardt, including the removal of "Intimidator" from the name of two roller coasters. As a result, Intimidator 305 was given the interim name of Project 305 in March 2024. That October, Kings Dominion indicated that Project 305 would be renamed to Pantherian for the 2025 season and would also be rethemed.

== Ride experience ==
Pantherian has been described as a mix of Millennium Force and Maverick, both located at Cedar Point. Intamin designed the ride to feature the high lift hill like Millennium Force. Following the lift hill are low-to-the-ground tight turns and hills, similar to Maverick. The ride features six air time hills and three low-to-the-ground high-speed turns over 5,100 feet (1,554 m) of track. The ride's capacity is 1,350 riders per hour, although Intamin gives a higher theoretical capacity of 1,500 riders per hour.

=== Layout ===
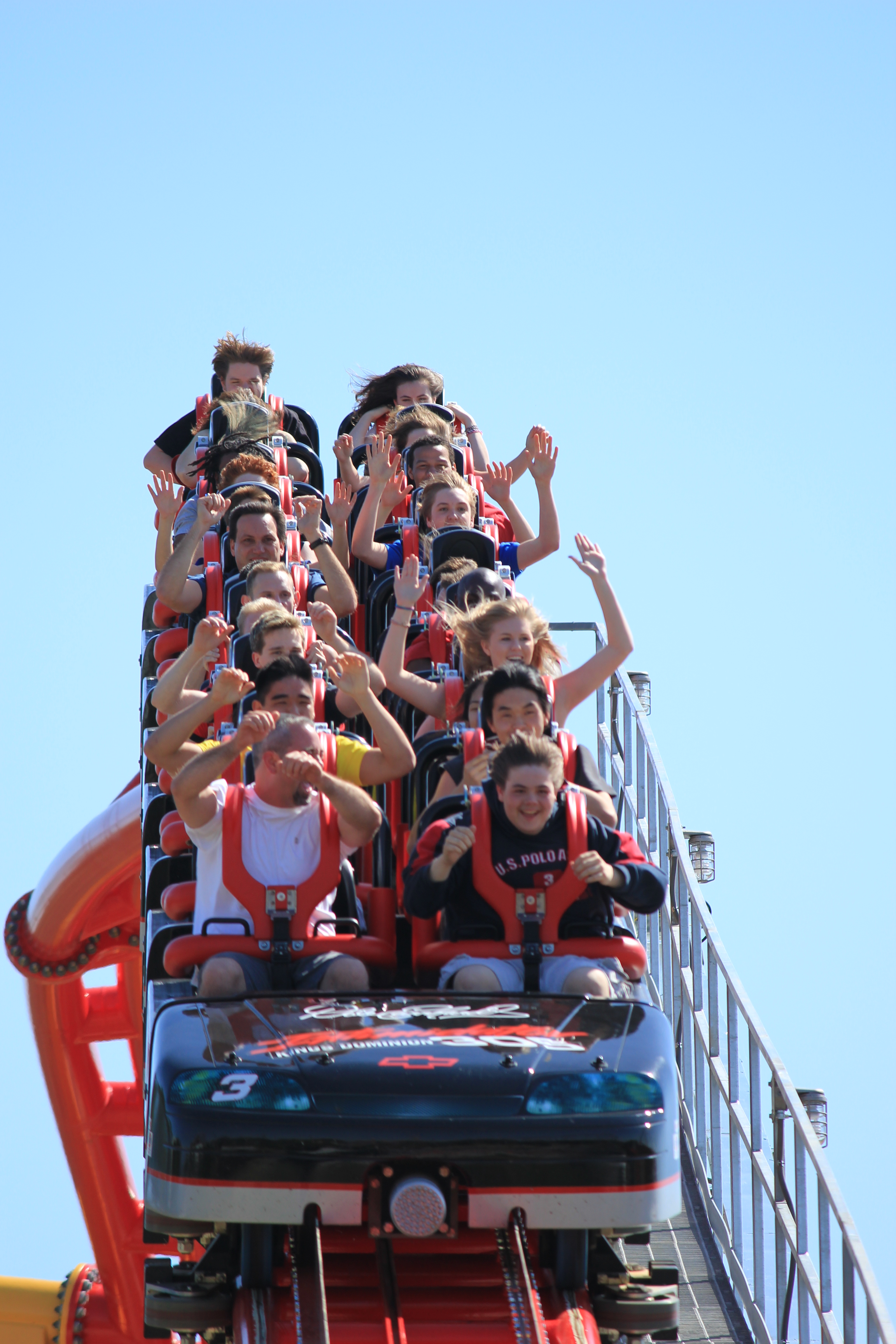
The silver train showing the older restraints

While the train is being loaded in the station, the catch car of the cable lift is latched onto the middle car of the train. Once the train is dispatched, the train ascends the 45-degree lift hill at 13.2 miles per hour (21.2 km/h) to a maximum height of 305 feet (93 m). Once the train crests the top of the lift, the train descends down the 300-foot (91 m), 85-degree drop, reaching speeds up to 90 mph (145 km/h). The drop is steep enough and sudden enough that riders towards the back of the train are thrown out of their seats into the restraints. The train turns right into a 270-degree turn before ascending the 150-foot (46 m) airtime hill. The train then descends into a high-speed bunny hop before entering another high-speed turn. The train then maneuvers 3 switchbacks before entering the final high-speed turn. The train then climbs another airtime hill with brakes, followed by another airtime hill before entering a final twist and then climbing a small, twisty bunny hop into the magnetic brakes. One cycle of the ride lasts about 3 minutes.

=== Trains and theme ===
Pantherian featured two trains that were originally themed as Dale Earnhardt's black number 3 car. The trains also originally featured headlights at the front of each train as well as advertisement stickers that are found on NASCAR cars. Both trains were black with silver stripes on the bottom of the trains. Originally one train was red and the other was silver. For the Pantherian theme, one train was repainted orange, with the other one being repainted dark blue. Each train has eight four-passenger cars, allowing thirty-two passengers per train. The trains are arranged in stadium-style seating with overhead lap bars fitted with soft, padded over-the-shoulder straps. In early July 2010, the ride received a unique new restraint design. The over-the-shoulder part of the harness now resembles a padded seat belt rather than the typical over-the-shoulder restraints used by Intamin.

== Reception ==
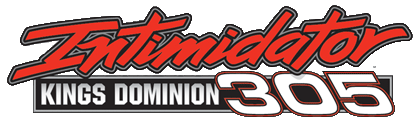
Logo from 2010 to 2023

When the ride opened, a writer for The Washington Post said: "Shot out of a cannon is as good a way as any to describe how it feels getting to the pinnacle. But the intimidation begins long before you are tightly harnessed into the train." A reporter for the Richmond Times-Dispatch wrote: "Mercifully, the ascent is swift and without pause at the peak, so there's no time to process what's happening."

=== Awards ===
Intimidator 305 was ranked in the Amusement Today's Golden Ticket Awards as the second-best new ride of 2010, with 21% of the vote.

Golden Ticket Awards: Best New Ride for 2010
Ranking	2

Golden Ticket Awards: Top steel Roller Coasters
Year									1998	1999
Ranking									–	–
Year	2000	2001	2002	2003	2004	2005	2006	2007	2008	2009
Ranking	–	–	–	–	–	–	–	–	–	–
Year	2010	2011	2012	2013	2014	2015	2016	2017	2018	2019
Ranking	11	13	12	10	13	16	17	13	12	11
Year	2020	2021	2022	2023	2024	2025	2026			
Ranking	N/A	13	9	9 (tie)	14	24	18			

Vote Coasters Poll
Year	2020	2021	2022	2023	2024
Ranking	19	33	25	21	19

== Incidents ==
On July 9, 2013, before the park opened for the day, one of the trains was performing a test run when it became stuck near the top of the lift hill. The train was brought down a week later, and the ride remained closed for more than two months. Kings Dominion later stated on their official Facebook page on August 28, 2013, that a problem with the gearbox weight distribution caused a part to warp and fail. The replacement part had to be custom-built in another country, causing the extended closure. The ride reopened on September 14, 2013.
