= Kumba (roller coaster) =

Ride at Busch Gardens Tampa Bay

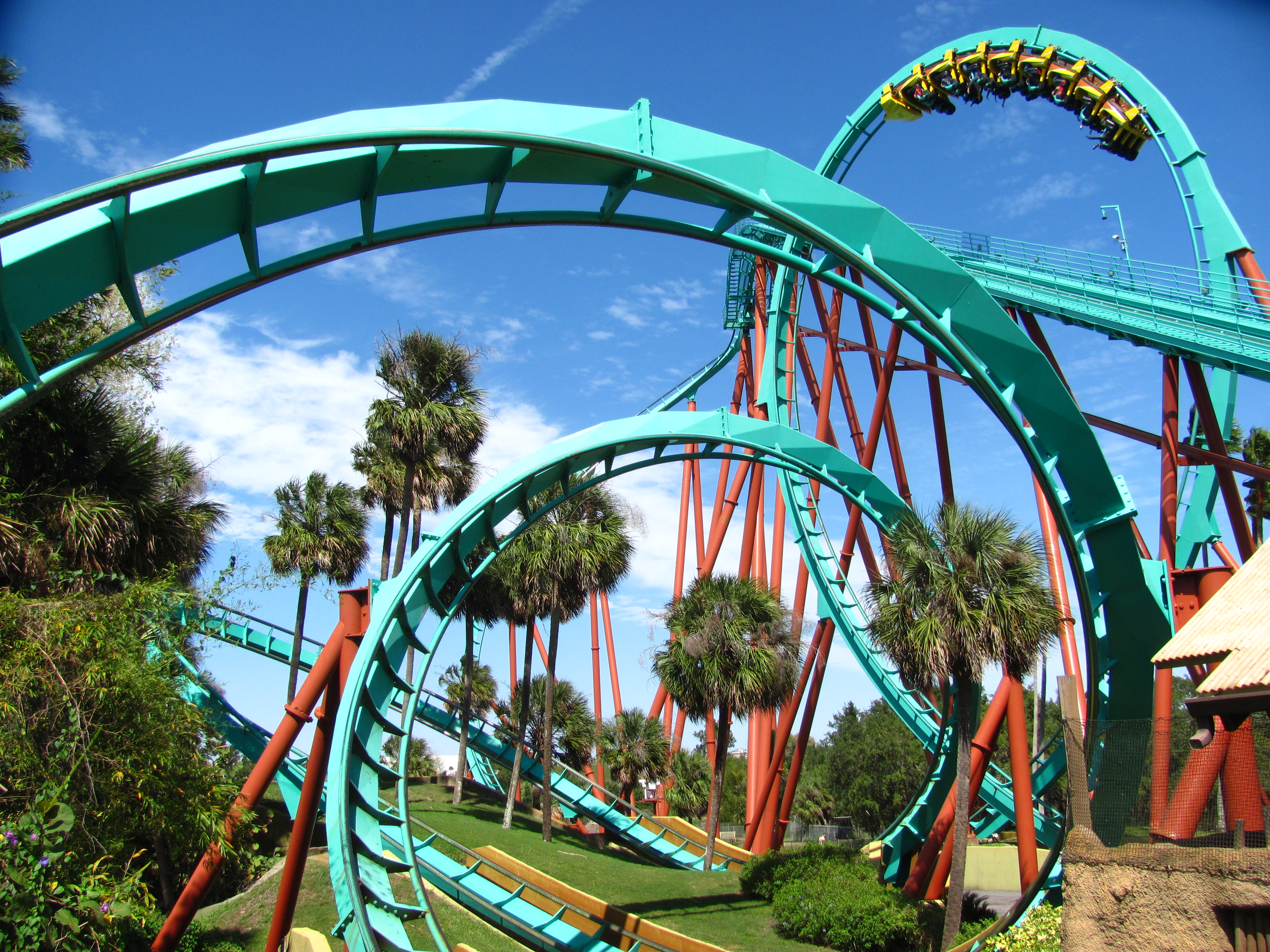
- Kumba was the first Bolliger and Mabillard coaster to feature interlocking corkscrews, and was one of only five in the world to feature a vertical loop around the lift hill.

Busch Gardens Tampa Bay
- Location: Busch Gardens Tampa Bay
- Park section: Congo
- Coordinates: 28°02′23″N 82°25′23″W
- Status: Closed
- Opening date: April 21, 1993; 33 years ago
- Closing date: August 2, 2026; 3 months ago
- Replaced by: Kumba's Revenge

General statistics
- Type: Steel
- Manufacturer: Bolliger & Mabillard
- Designer: Werner Stengel
- Model: Sitting Coaster
- Lift/launch system: Chain lift hill
- Height: 143 ft (44 m)
- Drop: 135 ft (41 m)
- Length: 3,978 ft (1,212 m)
- Speed: 60 mph (97 km/h)
- Inversions: 7
- Duration: 2:54
- G-force: 3.8
- Trains: 4 trains with 8 cars; riders arranged 4 across in a single row for a total of 32 riders per train
- Kumba at RCDB

Kumba was a steel roller coaster located at Busch Gardens Tampa Bay in Tampa, Florida, United States. Manufactured by Bolliger & Mabillard, the ride opened in 1993 and featured the world's tallest vertical loop. The coaster also featured seven inversions, a height of 143 feet (44 m), and a maximum speed of 60 mph (97 km/h). After more than 33 years of operation, Kumba permanently closed on August 2, 2026, following an extended closure in November 2024, less than a year after its reopening in September 2025.

== History ==
To compete with Orlando-based amusement parks, Busch Gardens Tampa officials deliberated on opening a new roller coaster throughout the 1980s following the park's animal and simulator ride additions over the previous years. Park officials worked on planning and design for Kumba two years prior to its announcement, with executives selecting the Congo section as the location to build the roller coaster. Busch Gardens officials proposed the layout to three roller coaster manufacturers based in the Netherlands, Switzerland, and the United States, with Bolliger & Mabillard earning the contract to build and manufacture Kumba.

Construction and pouring of the concrete foundations started in October 1992. Kumba was officially announced on November 10, 1992, as a record-breaking Bolliger & Mabillard roller coaster set to become the park's signature attraction. The announcement of Kumba was part of a larger, multi-million dollar expansion of the park with the roller coaster opening in the Spring season. The park marketed Kumba as representing a "mythical feline" whose howl is heard at night, further deriving "Kumba" being translated as "roar" from a Kongo language.

Vertical construction of Kumba's lift hill was observed by The Tampa Tribune in January 1993. Continued construction of the roller coaster's track was observed in February 1993, with The Tampa Tribune noting its near completion in early March and testing beginning in the same time period. The ride officially opened to the public on April 21, 1993. When Kumba opened, it featured the world's tallest vertical loop, and was also the tallest, fastest, and longest roller coaster in Florida.

In 1995, Kumba conceded the title of ride with the world's tallest vertical loop to Dragon Khan at PortAventura Park, which features a 118-foot-tall (36 m) vertical loop. In 1996, it conceded Florida's titles of tallest and longest roller coaster to Montu, a B&M inverted coaster in the Egypt section of the park. In 1999, it conceded the fastest title to Islands of Adventure's The Incredible Hulk Coaster, yet another B&M sitdown coaster. Busch Gardens Tampa Bay announced in July 2026 that Kumba would permanently close on August 2, 2026.

== Ride experience ==
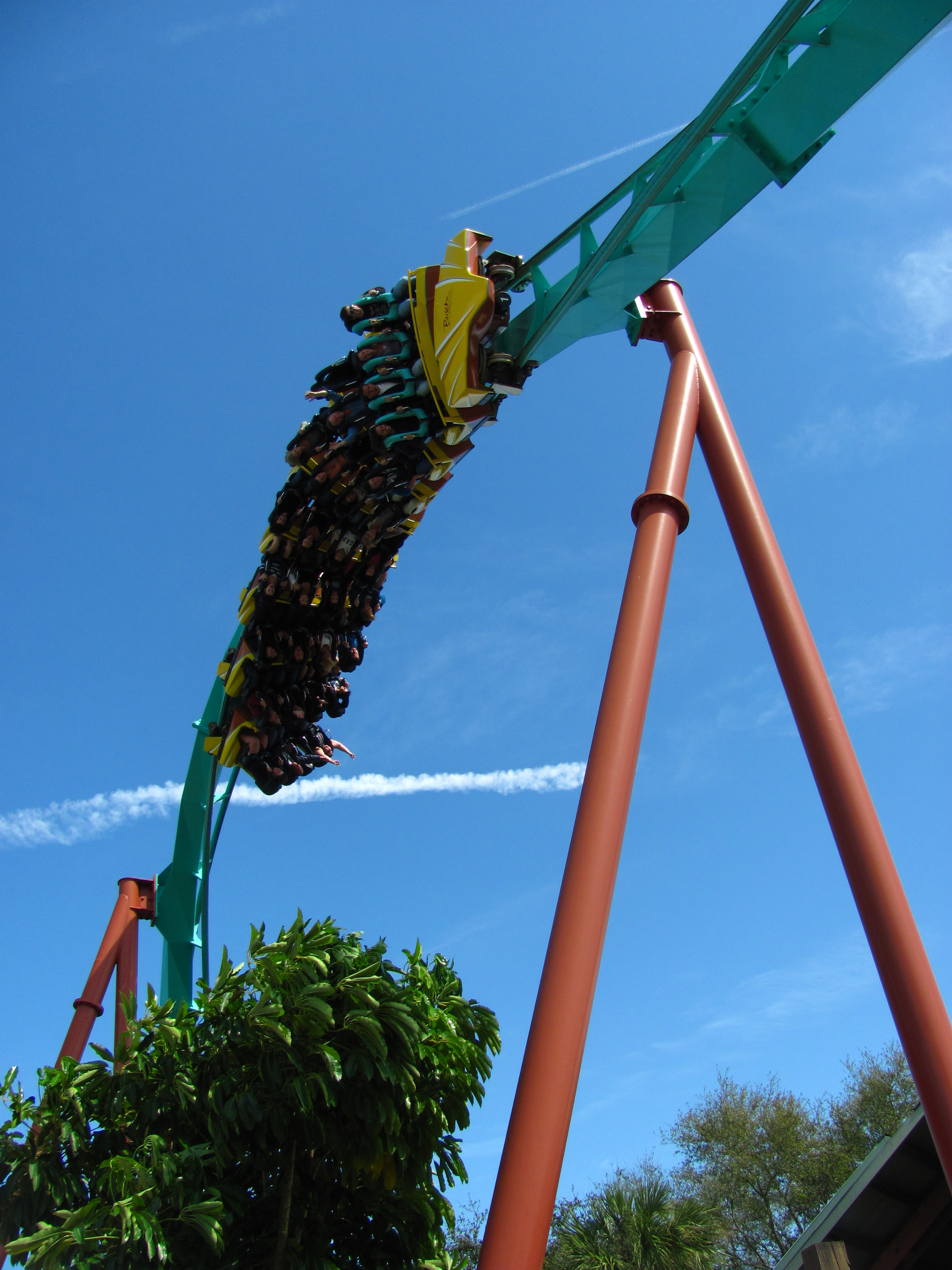
The zero-g roll, where riders experienced a feeling of weightlessness

The ride began with a right-hand, 90-degree turn out of the station, which then began to climb the 143-foot-tall (44 m) chain lift hill. After reaching the peak, trains went through a small pre-drop. The ride then went down a 135-foot (41 m) drop to the left into a 114-foot-tall (35 m) vertical loop that wrapped around the lift hill. After leaving the vertical loop, the ride rose into a diving loop, followed by a zero-g roll, where riders experienced a feeling of weightlessness. A straight section of track and a small hill led to a Cobra roll. After exiting the cobra roll, the trains rose into the mid-course brake run. The exit from the brake run led into a pair of interlocking corkscrews. The train then dived into a tunnel and exited into an upward clockwise helix. The train then hit the final brake run before making a right-hand turn and returning to the station.

== Characteristics ==
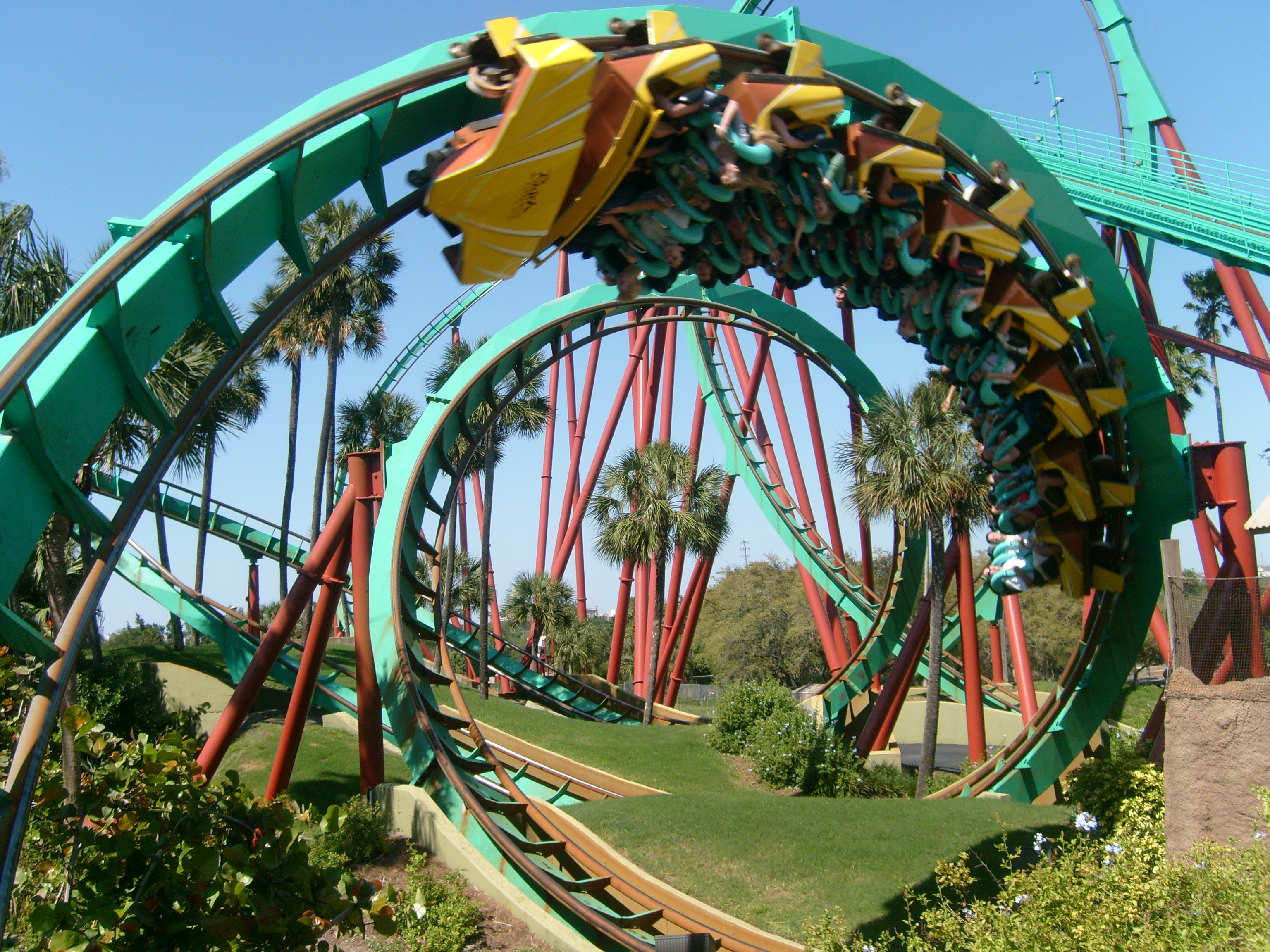
One of Kumba's trains exiting the second corkscrew

The 3,978-foot-long (1,212 m) Kumba stood 143 feet (44 m) tall and had a drop of 135 feet (41 m), with a top speed of 60 miles per hour (97 km/h). The ride featured seven inversions including a 114-foot-tall (35 m) vertical loop, a dive loop, a zero-g roll, a cobra roll, and two interlocking corkscrews. The vertical loop featured on Kumba wrapped around the lift hill. This element was later seen on The Riddler's Revenge at Six Flags Magic Mountain and Banshee at Kings Island. Kumba was the first ride in the world to feature a number of now-common roller coaster elements, including interlocking corkscrews and a dive loop. Riders of Kumba experienced up to 3.75 or 3.8 times the force of gravity on the 3-minute ride. Kumba covered three acres (1.2 ha) of the park's Congo section.

Kumba featured three steel and fiberglass trains, each containing eight cars. Each car seated four riders in a single row for a total of 32 riders per train. The block sections only allowed for three trains to be on the track at any one time, meaning the ride could still operate at full capacity when one train was undergoing maintenance. With all three trains operating, the ride could achieve a capacity of 1,700 riders per hour. The color scheme of the track was turquoise.

== Reception ==
Kumba was well received upon opening. Robb Alvey of Theme Park Review stated Kumba was his favorite ride in the Florida area, describing it as "an old-school, intense ride" that he had ridden hundreds of times. Dewayne Bevil of the Orlando Sentinel gave Kumba ratings of 4 out of 5 for both thrill and theming. Keith Kohn, also of the Sentinel, described the ride as "an amazing experience".

The opening of Kumba had a significant impact on park attendance figures. In its debut year, park attendance increased approximately 15% to an estimated 3.8 million visitors. The park expected that trend to continue into 1994. In 1995, Joe Fincher, Busch Gardens Tampa Bay's general manager, described Kumba as a "superstar roller coaster" that "had been terrific for us".

In Amusement Today's annual Golden Ticket Awards, Kumba consistently ranked highly. It was also one of only seven roller coasters to appear in the top 50 every year since the award's inception in 1998. It debuted at position 4 in 1998, before dropping to a low of 42 in 2016.

Golden Ticket Awards: Top steel Roller Coasters
Year									1998	1999
Ranking									4	5
Year	2000	2001	2002	2003	2004	2005	2006	2007	2008	2009
Ranking	7	13	19	22	22	22	21	21	27	27
Year	2010	2011	2012	2013	2014	2015	2016	2017	2018	2019
Ranking	24 (tie)	31	23	27	36	38	42 (tie)	41 (tie)	37	40
Year	2020	2021	2022	2023	2024	2025	2026			
Ranking	N/A	–	–	–	–	–	–			

Preceded by unknown	World's Tallest Vertical Loop; April 1993–May 1995	Succeeded by Dragon Khan
