= Boomerang (disambiguation) =

A boomerang is a curved wooden throwing implement.

Boomerang may also refer to:

== Aircraft ==
- CAC Boomerang, an Australian-designed and built fighter aircraft in World War 2
- Fisher Boomerang, a US-designed and built ultralight aircraft
- Scaled Composites Boomerang, an unconventional twin engine aircraft designed by Burt Rutan
- Schneider ES-60 Boomerang, an Australian-designed and built glider
- Whitney Boomerang, an Australian-designed and built training aircraft
- Boomerang, a de Havilland DH.88 Comet aircraft

== Entertainment ==
=== Comics ===
- Boomerang (character), a Marvel Comics supervillain
- Captain Boomerang, a DC Comics supervillain and enemy of the Flash

=== Films ===
- The Boomerang (1919 film), an American drama directed by Bertram Bracken
- The Boomerang (1925 film), an American comedy drama directed by Louis J. Gasnier
- Boomerang (1934 film), a British drama directed by Arthur Maude
- Boomerang! (1947 film), by Elia Kazan
- Boomerang (1966 film), about Polish-German love after World War II (also known as Bumerang), starring Tony Ferrer
- Boomerang (1976 film), a French-Italian crime film
- Boomerang (1992 film), starring Eddie Murphy
- Boomerang (2001 film), a Serbian film
- Boomerang (2015 film), a French film
- Boomerang (2019 film), an Indian Tamil-language film
- Boomerang (2023 film), an Indian Malayalam-language film
- Boomerang (2024 Indian film), an Indian Bengali-language film
- Boomerang (2024 German-Iranian film)

=== Television ===
- Boomerang (Australian TV program), a 1961–1962 Australian television discussion program broadcast on GTV-9 in Melbourne
- Boomerang (TV network), a TV channel operated by Cartoon Network with various international versions:
  - Boomerang (Asian TV channel), former TV channel
  - Boomerang (Australian TV channel)
  - Boomerang (British and Irish TV channel)
  - Boomerang (Canadian TV channel)
  - Boomerang (Central and Eastern Europe TV channel), former TV channel
  - Boomerang (German TV channel), former TV channel
  - Boomerang (Italian TV channel)
  - Boomerang (Latin American TV channel), former TV channel
  - Boomerang (Middle East and Africa TV channel), former TV channel
  - Boomerang (Portuguese TV channel), former TV channel
  - Boomerang (Scandinavian TV channel), former TV channel
  - Boomerang (South Korean TV channel), former TV channel
  - Boomerang (Spanish TV channel), former TV channel
  - Boomerang (Turkish TV channel), former TV channel
- Boomerang (American TV series), an American comedy television series from BET
- Boomerang, a Seattle-area kids' TV show hosted by Marni Nixon
- "Boomerang", an episode from Peppa Pig

=== Other uses in entertainment ===
- The Boomerang (1887–1892), newspaper in Brisbane, Australia
- Boomerang (1894), weekly magazine published in Melbourne by Edward Findley
- Boomerang: Travels in the New Third World, a 2011 nonfiction book by Michael Lewis
- Boomerang! (audio magazine), for kids
- Boomerang, an arcade game also known as Ikki
- Laramie Boomerang, a daily newspaper in Laramie, Wyoming
- "Boomerang Songster" marketed in Australia by J. Albert & Son
- The Boomerang, a 1915 play by Winchell Smith and Victor Mapes

== Music ==
=== Albums ===
- Boomerang (Betty Boo album), 2022
- Boomerang (The Creatures album), 1989
- Boomerang (Daara J album), 2003
- Boomerang (Hanson album), 2005
- Boomerang (Mad at the World album), 1991
- Boomerang (soundtrack), from the 1992 film
- Boomerang (Stacey Q album), 1997

=== Songs ===
- "Boomerang" (Barenaked Ladies song), 2013
- "Boomerang" (Lali Espósito song), 2016
- "Boomerang" (DJ Felli Fel song), 2011
- "Boomerang" (The Grace song), 2006
- "Boomerang" (Nicole Scherzinger song), 2013
- "Boomerang" (JoJo Siwa song), 2016
- "Boomerang" (Wanna One song), 2018
- "Boomerang" (Romeo Santos song), 2023
- "Boomerang", by Big Pun from Capital Punishment
- "Boomerang", by Exo from The War: The Power of Music
- "Boomerang", by Imagine Dragons from Origins
- "Boomerang", by Jana Kramer from Thirty One
- "Boomerang", by Jay Rock from Follow Me Home
- "Boomerang", by Kiss from Hot in the Shade
- "Boomerang", by Kix from Blow My Fuse
- "Boomerang", by Plain White T's from Wonders of the Younger
- "Boomerang", by Pigeon John in collaboration with 20syl
- "Boomerang", by Relient K from Collapsible Lung
- "Boomerang", a single by Kim Petras

== Science ==
- BOOMERanG experiment, a sub-orbital experiment which studied the properties of cosmic microwave background radiation
- Boomerang (Spacecraft)
- Boomerang Nebula, a nebula in Centaurus

== Ships ==
- HMS Boomerang (1889)
- Boomerang (schooner), an operational 1903 schooner, part of the Sydney Heritage Fleet

== Roller coasters ==
- Boomerang (roller coaster), a common design with over 50 installations throughout the world, including:
  - Boomerang (Six Flags México)
  - Boomerang (Six Flags St. Louis)
  - Boomerang (Worlds of Fun)

== Technology ==
- Boomerang (countermeasure), a gunfire locator
- Boomerang (programming language)
- Boomerang, an Instagram app
- Maserati Boomerang, an automobile
- A controller for the PlayStation 3 games console

== Other uses ==
- Boomerang (cocktail), made with rye whiskey and Swedish Punsch
- Boomerang (horse) (1966–1983), show jumping horse
- Boomerang Generation
- Boomarang Diner
- Boomerang effect (psychology)
- Imperial boomerang
- Boomerang, Elizabeth Bay, historic house in Australia
- "Boomerang harmonica" by Hohner, marketed in Australia by J. Albert & Son
- The Boomerang, a weekly Australian newspaper published from 1887 to 1892
- Boomerang Festival, part of Byron Bay Bluesfest, an Australian music festival
- Color magazine (lighting), also called a boomerang, used to change the colors of a spotlight
- Flying Boomerangs, an Australian rules football team
- Boomerang Range, a narrow mountain range on the western side of the Skelton Glacier and Skelton Névé, Antarctica

== See also ==
- Flying wing, a boomerang-shaped aircraft
- VPK-7829 Bumerang, a Russian Army armoured personnel carrier
