= Batman: The Ride (Six Flags México) =

Roller coaster

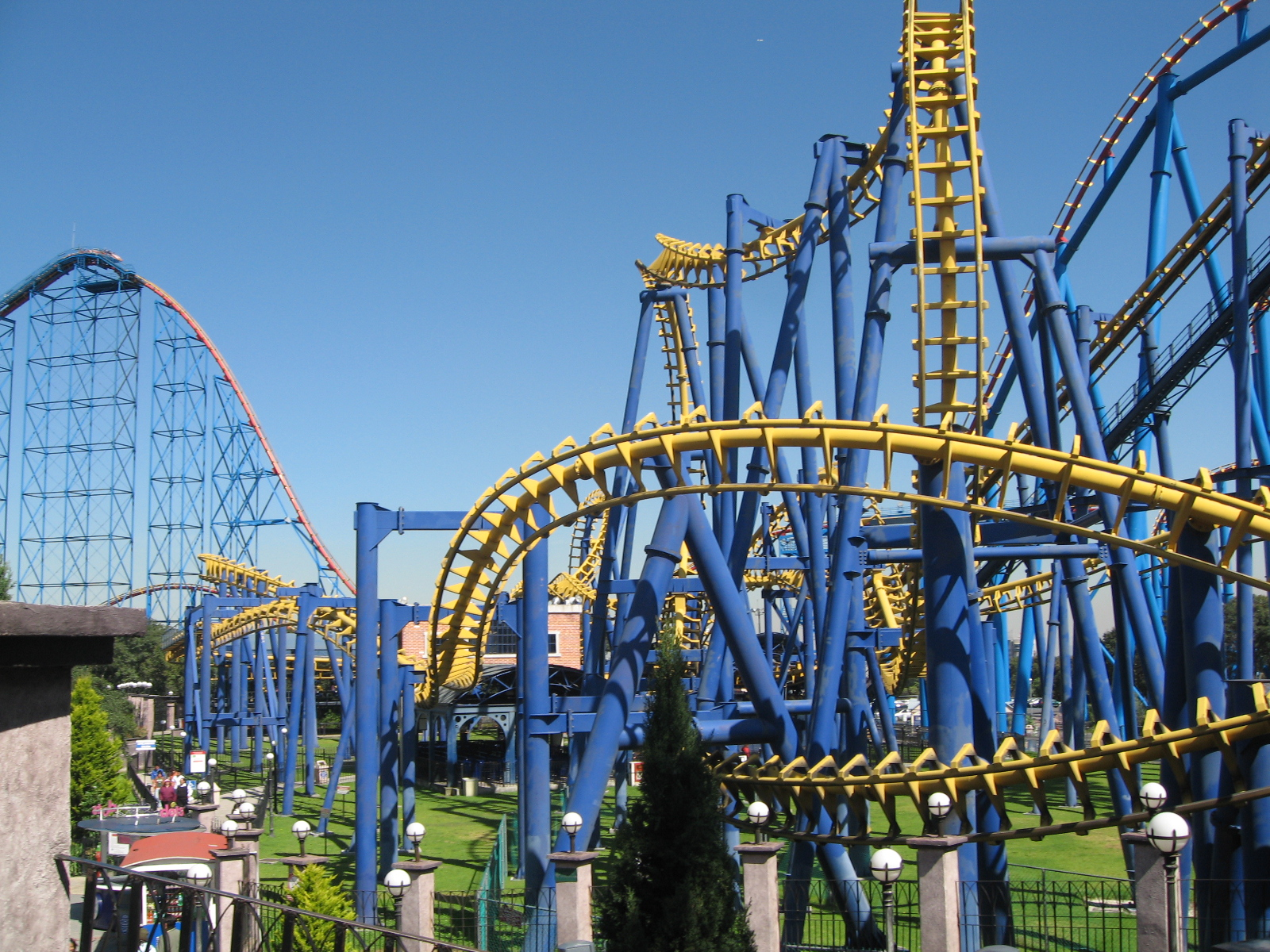

Six Flags México
- Location: Six Flags México
- Coordinates: 19.2952°N 99.2065°W
- Status: Operating
- Opening date: April 14, 2000

General statistics
- Type: Steel – Inverted
- Manufacturer: Vekoma
- Lift/launch system: Chain lift hill
- Height: 109.3 ft (33.3 m)
- Length: 2,260.5 ft (689.0 m)
- Speed: 49.7 mph (80.0 km/h)
- Inversions: 5
- Duration: 1:36
- Capacity: 1,040 riders per hour
- Height restriction: 51 in (130 cm)
- Trains: 2 trains with 10 cars. Riders are arranged 2 across in a single row for a total of 20 riders per train.
- Fast Lane available
- Batman: The Ride at RCDB

Batman: The Ride is an inverted coaster at Six Flags México that has been operating since 2000. It is a standard Vekoma Suspended Looping Coaster model themed to the famed Batman franchise, and was part of Premier Park's massive renovation in 2000.

== History ==
In 1999, Premier Parks, the holding company for all Six Flags theme parks at the time, bought Six Flags México, then known as Reino Aventura, for an estimated $59 million. Management then proceeded to utilize $40 million to renovate the park, which included the addition of 20 new attractions, 18 of which are still operating today. Batman: The Ride was one of them. It officially opened to the public on April 14, 2000.

== Characteristics ==
=== Model ===
Batman: The Ride is a steel Vekoma Suspended Looping Coaster, instead of the similarly themed Bolliger & Mabillard inverts that opened at various Six Flags theme parks in the 1990s. However, this coaster model is very common, with identical coasters existing all around the world. It is the only inverted coaster of any kind or model currently operating in the country.

=== Statistics ===
Batman: The Ride has a total length of 2,260.5 ft (689.0 m), a top speed of 49.7 mph (80.0 km/h), and a height of 109.3 ft (33.3 m), the highest point of the ride being the peak of the lift hill. The coaster also boasts 5 inversions; including the SLC signature Sea Serpent Roll (which counts as two), a sidewinder, and two inline twists, which occur one after the other.

=== Trains ===
Batman: The Ride utilizes two 20 passenger trains, making for an estimated hourly capacity of 1.040 riders per hour. The trains are outfitted with over-the-shoulder vest restraints, which are known to aid the typical head banging that Suspended Looping Coasters normally get. Riders must be minimum 51 inches tall to ride, although most SLCs require a 52-inch minimum.

=== Layout ===
The coaster follows the same layout as the standard Suspended Looping Coaster. The ride starts by taking riders up a 33.3-metre (109 ft) chain hill. Once at the top, the train goes down a steep, banked turn to the right where it enters the first inversion element - a Sea Serpent Roll (also known as a Roll Over), which first features a Sidewinder quickly followed by a reverse sidewinder. Upon exit from this element, the train goes up a hill featuring some banking at the top before descending and approaching the ride's next inversion - a sidewinder. A sidewinder is similar to an Immelmann loop; however, it features a half loop followed by a half corkscrew (rather than an inline twist). From the exit of this sidewinder, the train goes into a sharp 270° helix before entering the ride's final two inversions - inline twists, one after the other. A banked curve to the right turns the train back around to face towards the station, whereas the coaster hits the brake run, and makes two 90° turns to the right, through another brake run, before re-entering the station.

== Location ==
The coaster is located in the DC Universe section of the park, beside attractions such as Superman El Último Escape, Super Girl Sky Flight, and Wonder Woman Coaster, as well as the Teen Titans Turbo Gokarts attraction that was installed alongside it back in 2000.
