= Alligator Peak =

Mountain peak in Oates Land, Antarctica

Coordinates: 78°28′S 158°45′E

Geography
- Location: Antarctica
- Parent range: Boomerang Range

For the location in Canada, see Alligator Peak, British Columbia

Alligator Peak () is a prominent conical rock peak at the head of Alligator Ridge in the Boomerang Range of Antarctica. It was named for its proximity to Alligator Ridge by the 1957–58 New Zealand party of the Commonwealth Trans-Antarctic Expedition, 1956–58.
