= The Joker (Six Flags México) =

Spinning roller coaster

- Previously known as Tony Hawk's Big Spin at Six Flags Discovery Kingdom (2008-2010); Pandemonium (2011-2012) at Six Flags Discovery Kingdom
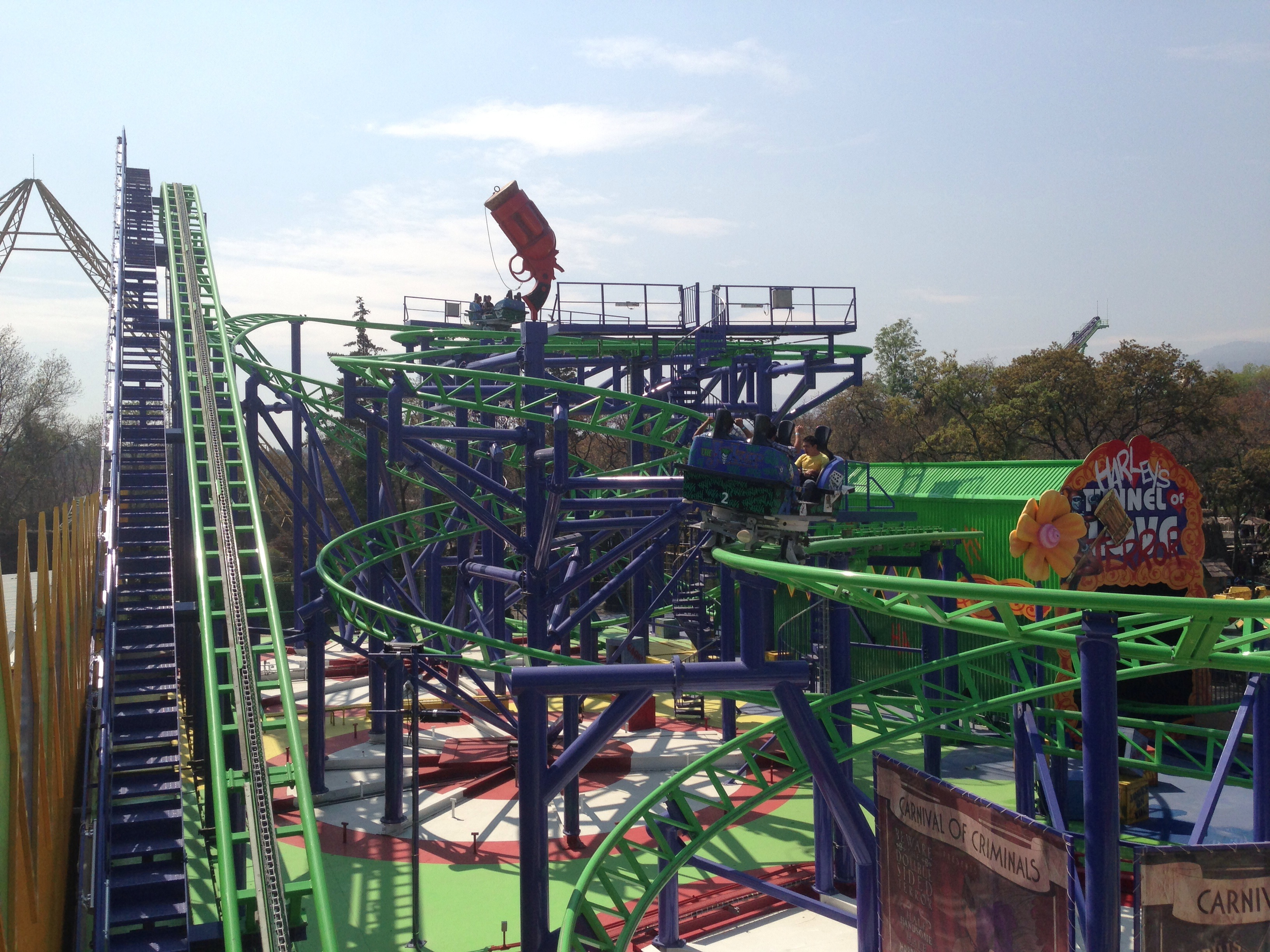

Six Flags México
- Park section: Pueblo Francés
- Coordinates: 19.2951°N 99.2082°W
- Status: Operating
- Opening date: March 7, 2013

Six Flags Discovery Kingdom
- Park section: Sky
- Coordinates: 38°08′19.2″N 122°13′51.8″W
- Status: Removed
- Opening date: May 23, 2008
- Closing date: 2012
- Replaced by: Superman Ultimate Flight

General statistics
- Type: Steel – Spinning
- Manufacturer: Gerstlauer
- Designer: Werner Stengel
- Lift/launch system: Chain lift hill
- Height: 48 ft (15 m)
- Drop: 27 ft (8.2 m)
- Length: 1,351 ft (412 m)
- Speed: 31 mph (50 km/h)
- Height restriction: 42 in (107 cm)
- Cars: Riders are seated 2 across, in 2 rows, for a total of 4 riders per car.
- Fast Lane available
- The Joker at RCDB

The Joker is a spinning roller coaster located at Six Flags México, a theme park in Mexico. The ride was designed by Gerstlauer and Werner Stengel. The Joker opened for the public on March 7, 2013.

The Joker's design consists of several cars holding four riders each. While the cars traverse the track, they spin around according to the angle of the track and the shifts in the riders' weight.

== History ==
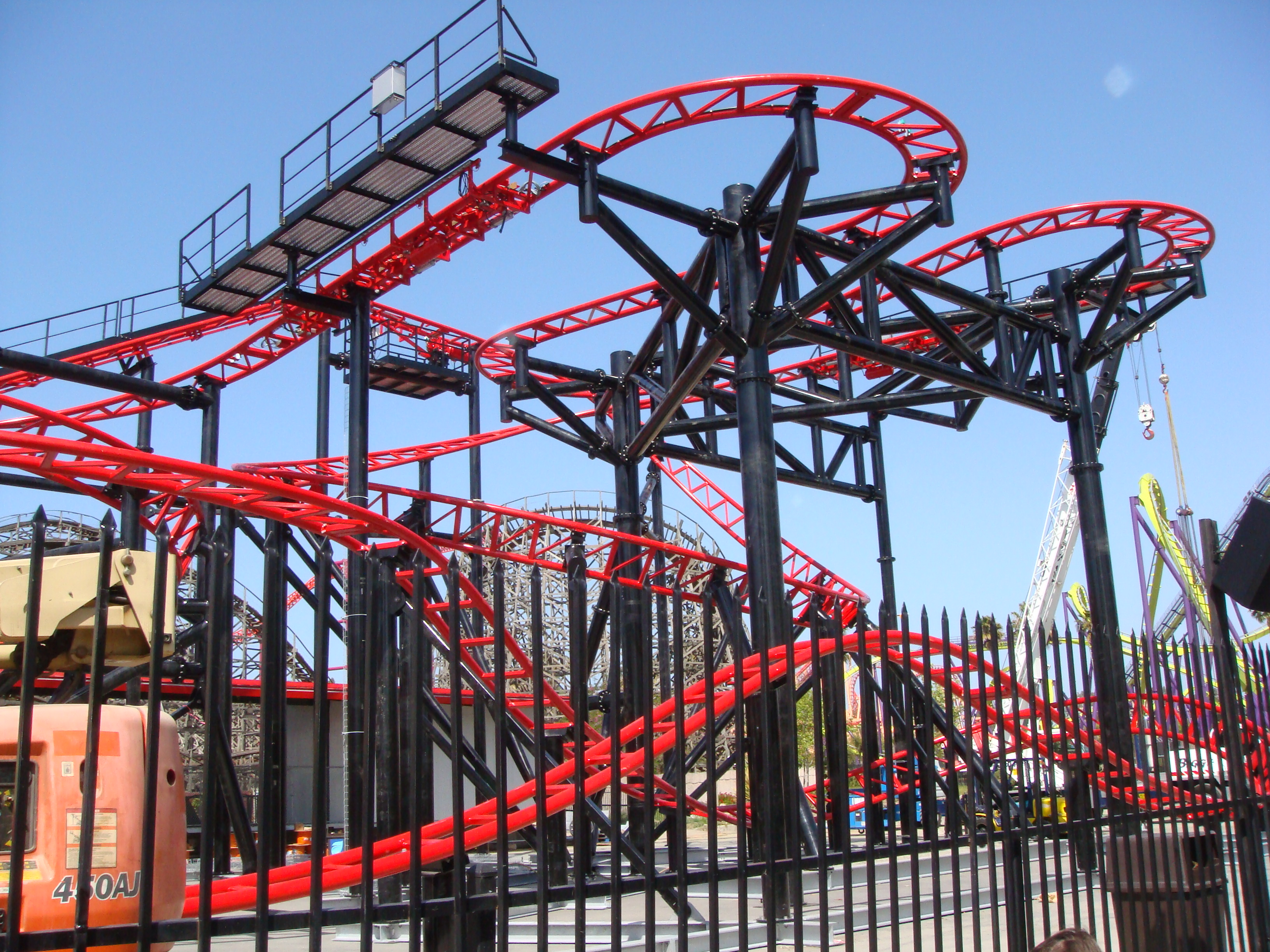
The Joker at Discovery Kingdom as Tony Hawk's Big Spin

At the end of 2007, Six Flags Discovery Kingdom announced a new roller coaster billed as the "Tony Hawk experience" and was designed to have the look and feel of a skate park. It offered a full "extreme sports" experience, with monitors in the queue lines displaying highlights of the history of action sports, and a large spinning Tony Hawk figure crowning the ride. Tony Hawk's Big Spin opened to the public on May 28, 2008 in California, in the Sky section of the park where Zonga was previous located.

In November 2010, Six Flags began the process of terminating several licensing deals they had with various brands that they deemed unnecessary, including the one they had with Tony Hawk to use his brand and likeness. Six Flags Discovery Kingdom's 2010 season operating schedule lasted into January 2011 for Holiday in the Park, so the park quickly removed Tony Hawk's name from the ride and any other memorabilia associated with him and operated the coaster as "Big Spin" for the remainder of the season. At the beginning of the 2011 season, Big Spin was officially renamed to Pandemonium like the other versions of the coaster at Six Flags Discovery Kingdom's sister parks.

In late 2011, Superman: Ultimate Flight was announced to be built at Discovery Kingdom for the 2012 season, which would replace their installation of Pandemonium. The ride permanently closed on January 1, 2012. As Pandemonium was a relatively new coaster, Six Flags decided to move the coaster to the headquarters of Larson International and Roller Coaster Museum, which are both located in Plainview, Texas, to keep in storage. In mid 2012, Six Flags México announced The Joker for the 2013 season. Freshly repainted and recolored track of the former Pandemonium roller coaster was later moved from Texas to Mexico, where it was reassembled and reopened on March 7, 2013.

== Layout ==
According to the Gerstlauer website, there are two different versions of its spinning roller coaster model, as well as a customization option for a park to fit its desires. The Joker is the only 400 model in operation, as the rest are the 420 model. The 400 model is shorter at 48 feet (15 m), more compact and has a lower capacity. The layout consists of several "segments" separated by brakes. The first segment includes a swooping drop and a climb into the second segment, which is a series of S-shaped turns. The third segment is a heavily banked figure-8; the fourth is a series of hills that form a semicircle; the fifth is a pair of small hills; and the sixth is a helix into the seventh segment, which is a long loop that leads to a massive hill and finally into the brake run. For most of the ride, the cart is spinning around rapidly.
