= Allemand Peak =

Peak in the Boomerang Range, Antarctica

Coordinates: 78°24′S 158°36′E

Geography
- Location: Antarctica
- Parent range: Boomerang Range

Allemand Peak is a peak lying 1.5 miles (2.4 km) south of Moody Peak in the north part of the Boomerang Range of Antarctica. It was named by the Advisory Committee on Antarctic Names in 1964 for Lawrence J. Allemand, construction driver at Little America V in 1958.
