= Pandemonium (roller coaster) =

Roller coaster at five amusement parks

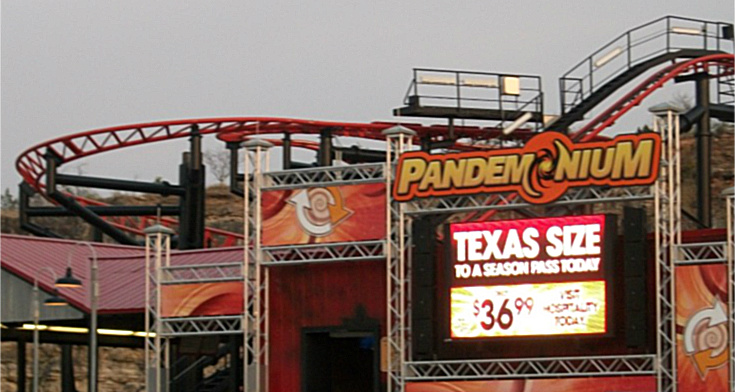
- Pandemonium at Fiesta Texas

General statistics
- Type: Steel – Spinning
- Manufacturer: Gerstlauer
- Designer: Werner Stengel
- Lift/launch system: Chain lift hill
- Drop: 27 ft (8.2 m)
- Length: 1,351 ft (412 m)
- Speed: 31 mph (50 km/h)
- Height restriction: 42 in (107 cm)
- Cars: 8 cars. Riders arranged 2 across in 2 rows for a total of 4 riders per car.
- Fast Lane available
- Pandemonium at RCDB

Pandemonium is a steel spinning roller coaster designed by Gerstlauer, located at several Six Flags amusement parks and at Mid America Adventure in the United States. Since 2005, Six Flags has installed Pandemonium in five of its parks.

Its design consists of several cars holding four riders each. While the cars traverse the track, they spin around according to the angle of the track and the shifts in the riders' weight.

== History ==
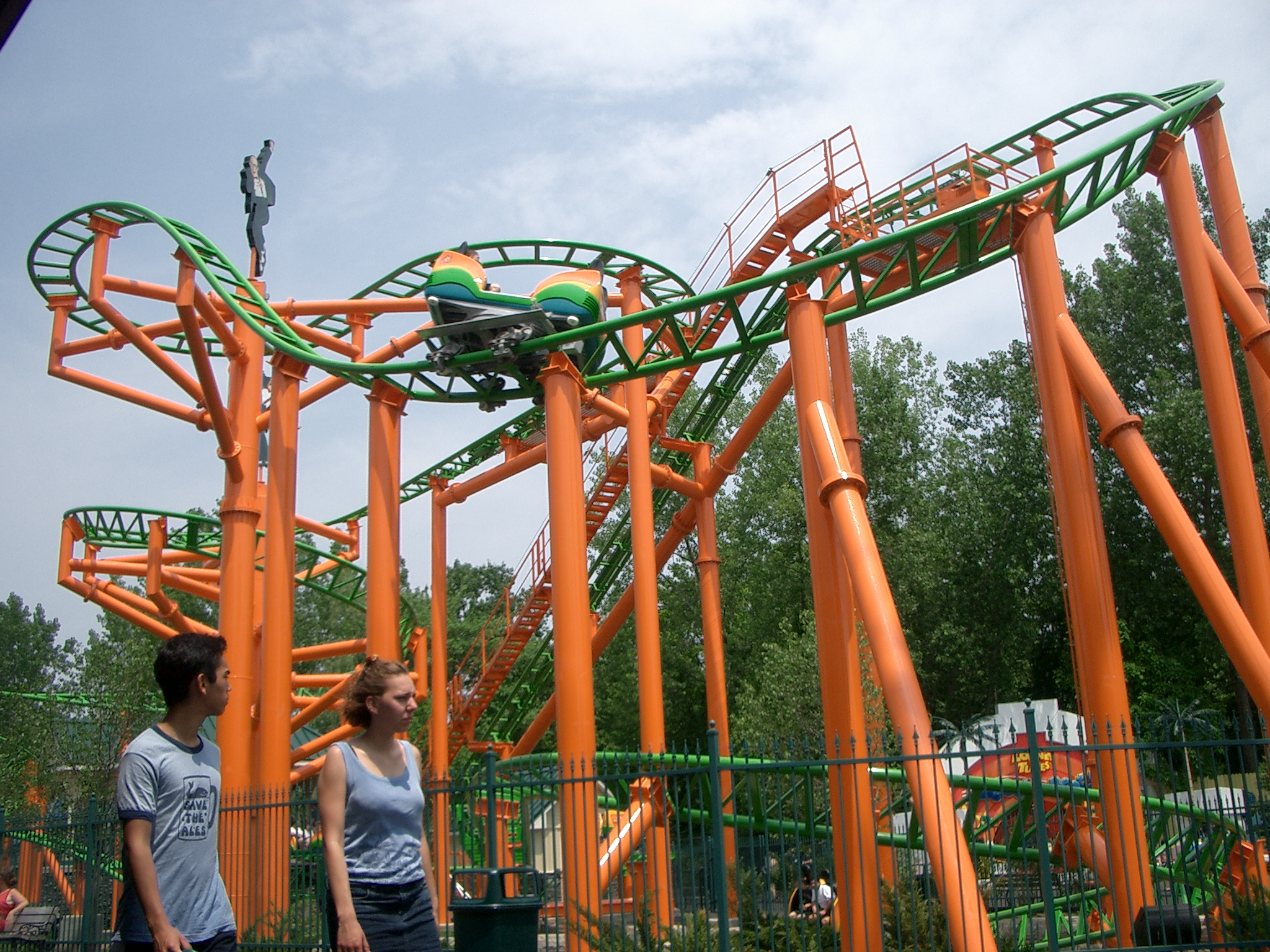
New England's Pandemonium when it was known as "Mr. Six's Pandemonium"

The first installation of Pandemonium opened at Six Flags New England on April 16, 2005 and dubbed as Mr. Six's Pandemonium. The New England park went to a roller coaster manufacturer, Gerstlauer, to help bring a coaster to the park that all ages would be attracted to. Gerstlauer then introduced Six Flags with the manufacturer's latest development of the spinning roller coaster, which was developed in the early 2000s. In early 2005, Six Flags New England announced its plans for the upcoming season by adding two roller coasters to the park, including Mr. Six's Pandemonium, themed after the advertising character of the company. Without any notice, Six Flags New England removed the theming of Mr. Six on the roller coaster and operated it as Pandemonium for the start of the 2007 season.

In late 2006 and early 2007, both Six Flags Fiesta Texas and then-named Six Flags St. Louis announced the addition of a new spinning coaster to their respective parks. Six Flags licensed with professional skateboarder, Tony Hawk, to help brand the company's newest two coasters after the success of the Boom Boom HuckJam, which toured many Six Flags parks in 2006. The ride was originally billed as the "Tony Hawk experience" and was designed to have the look and feel of a large red-and-black skatepark. It offered a full "extreme sports" experience, with monitors in the queue lines displaying highlights of the history of action sports and a large spinning Tony Hawk figure crowning the ride. In 2007, both parks equipped their two new coasters with CD ride technology that captures the guests' on-ride experience which is put on a DVD for a take home souvenir.

With the success of Tony Hawk's Big Spin, Six Flags announced in late 2007 that they would be adding two more to their parks. Six Flags Discovery Kingdom and Six Flags Over Texas both opened the next two installments in the spring of 2008.

In November 2010, Six Flags began the process of cancelling licensed intellectual property deals they had with various brands, including the agreement with Tony Hawk himself, as the company was emerging itself from bankruptcy at that time. Discovery Kingdom, Fiesta Texas, and Over Texas operated the coasters under Hawk's brand until January 2011, following the 2010 run of Holiday in the Park. Afterward, those three parks quickly dropped Hawk's name from the ride and any other memorabilia associated with him and operated their coaster as Big Spin for the remainder of the season. At the start of the new season in 2011, all four Tony Hawk's Big Spins were officially renamed to Pandemonium like their sister park at New England.

In late 2011, Six Flags announced that Superman: Ultimate Flight would be built at Discovery Kingdom, replacing their Pandemonium roller coaster. The new ride would reuse the PLC room and extended queue area, which was formerly the station for Zonga. Pandemonium at Discovery Kingdom officially closed at the park on January 1, 2012. As Pandemonium was a relatively new coaster, Six Flags moved it to the headquarters of Larson International and Roller Coaster Museum, both located in Plainview, Texas, for storage. In mid 2012, Six Flags México announced The Joker for the 2013 season. The track of the stored Pandemonium was moved from Texas to Mexico.

== Layout ==
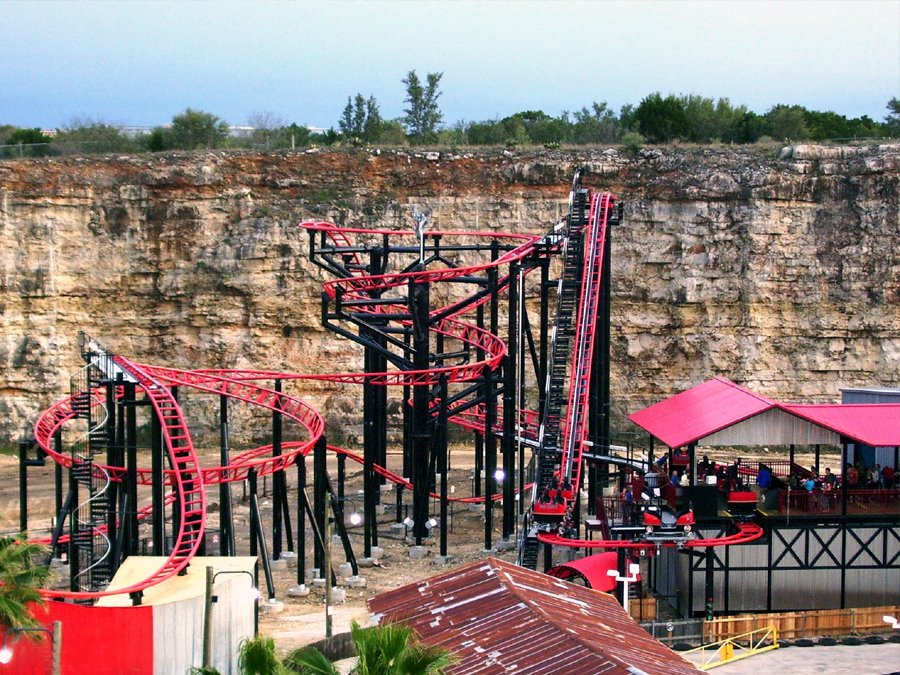
Fiesta Texas's Pandemonium

According to the Gerstlauer website, the manufacturer has two different models of its spinning roller coaster collection, as well as one custom option for a park to fit its desires. The five Pandemoniums make up both of the two, the 400 and the 420. Each model has different statistics, so the Pandemoniums range in height from 52 feet (16 m) to 54 feet (16 m) with the same speed of 31 miles per hour (50 km/h). Discovery Kingdom was the only park to feature the 400 as the others were the 420 model. The 400 model, is shorter at 48 feet (15 m), more compact and had a lower capacity. The layout consists of several "segments" separated by brakes. The first segment comprises a swooping drop and climb into the second segment, which is a series of S-shaped turns. The third segment is a heavily banked figure-8; the fourth is a series of hills that form a semicircle; the fifth is a pair of small hills; and the sixth is a helix into the seventh segment; a long loop, which leads to a massive hill and finally into the brake run. For most of the ride, the cart is spinning around rapidly.

Six Flags Fiesta Texas and Mid America Adventure's versions of Pandemonium have a portion of its track above a half-pipe-themed structure, a remnant of the former skate park theming for when the rides were "Tony Hawk's Big Spin".

== Installations ==
All rides were installed by Ride Entertainment Group, which handle all of Gerstlauer's operations in North America.

Park	Area	Model	Opening date	Status	Refs
Six Flags New England	North End	Spinning Coaster Model 420	April 16, 2005	Operating	
Six Flags Fiesta Texas	Fiesta Bay Boardwalk	Spinning Coaster Model 420	March 10, 2007	Operating	
Mid America Adventure	Britannia	Spinning Coaster Model 420	April 21, 2007	Operating	
Six Flags Over Texas	Boomtown	Spinning Coaster Model 420	May 17, 2008	Operating	
Six Flags Discovery Kingdom	Sky	Spinning Coaster Model 380	May 23, 2008	Relocated to Six Flags México as The Joker	
