= Alligator Ridge =

Ridge in Oates Land, Antarctica

Coordinates: 78°27′S 158°48′E

Geography
- Location: Antarctica
- Parent range: Boomerang Range

Alligator Ridge is a spectacular serrated rock ridge in Antarctica, extending northeast for 2 nautical miles (4 km) from Alligator Peak in the Boomerang Range into Skelton Neve. It was mapped and named for its shape by the 1957–58 New Zealand party of the Commonwealth Trans-Antarctic Expedition, 1956–58.
