= Medusa Steel Coaster =

Steel roller coaster at Six Flags México

- Previously known as Medusa

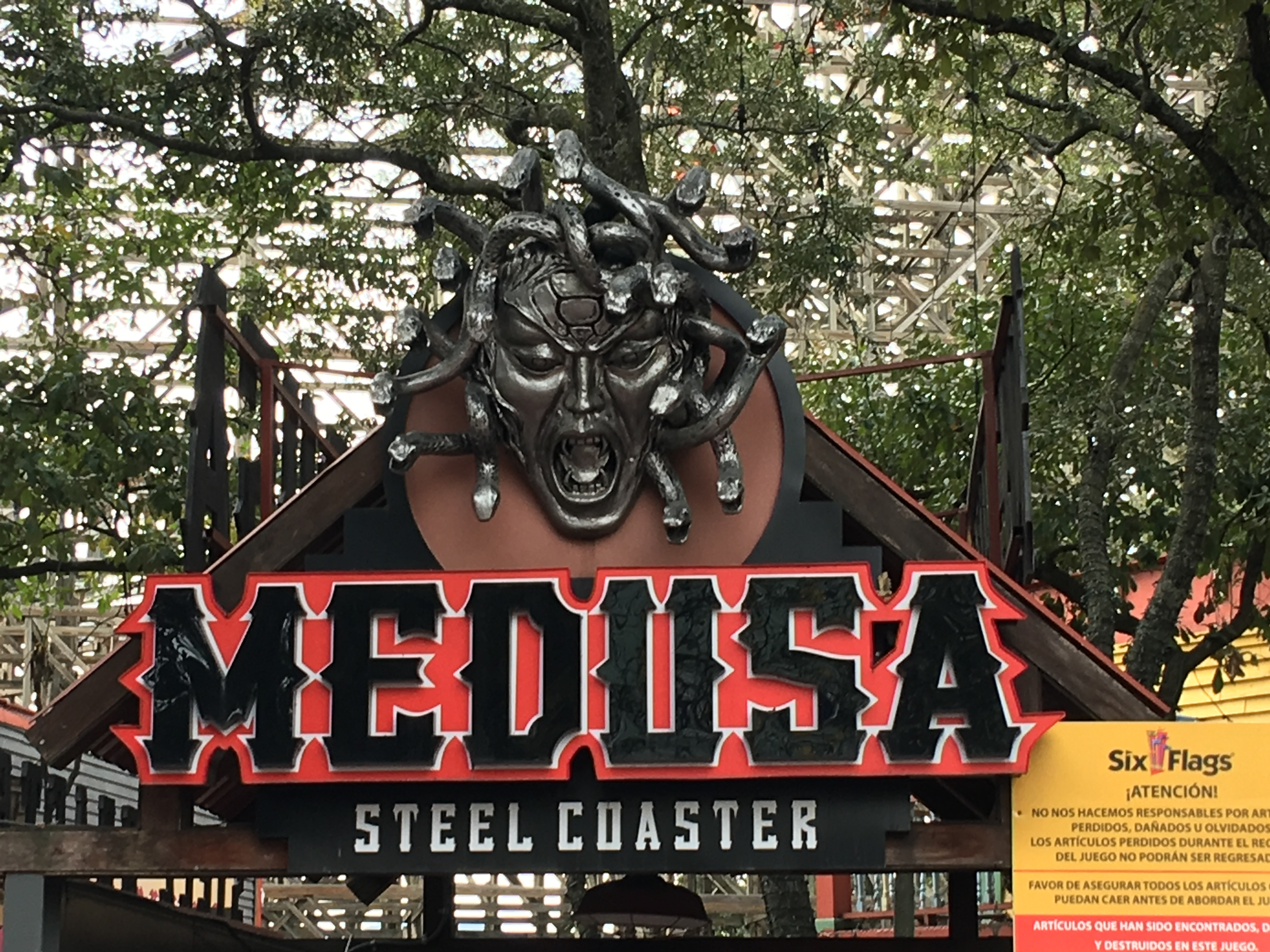

Six Flags México
- Location: Six Flags México
- Park section: Pueblo Vaquero
- Coordinates: 19.294535°N 99.211230°W
- Status: Operating
- Opening date: 2 June 2000 (as Medusa); 14 June 2014 (as Medusa Steel Coaster)
- Closing date: 13 August 2013 (as Medusa)
- Replaced: Medusa

General statistics
- Type: Steel
- Manufacturer: Rocky Mountain Construction
- Designer: Alan Schilke
- Model: I-Box
- Lift/launch system: Chain lift hill
- Height: 82 ft (25 m)
- Drop: 118 ft (36 m)
- Length: 3,000 ft (910 m)
- Speed: 58 mph (93 km/h)
- Inversions: 3
- Duration: 1:45
- Max vertical angle: 54°
- Height restriction: 51 in (130 cm)
- Trains: 2 trains with 6 cars; riders arranged 2 across in 2 rows for a total of 24 riders per train
- Fast Lane available
- Medusa Steel Coaster at RCDB

Medusa Steel Coaster, formerly known as simply Medusa, is a steel roller coaster located at Six Flags México in Mexico City. Manufactured by Rocky Mountain Construction (RMC) and designed by Alan Schilke, the ride opened to the public on 14 June 2014. It was originally a wooden coaster constructed by Custom Coasters International that debuted in June 2000. The wooden track was completely removed and replaced with RMC's I-Box track technology, a steel conversion that resulted in a new track layout with increased speed and the addition of three inversions. Medusa was generally well-received, ranking several times in the top 50 among steel roller coasters in the annual Golden Ticket Awards from Amusement Today.

== History ==
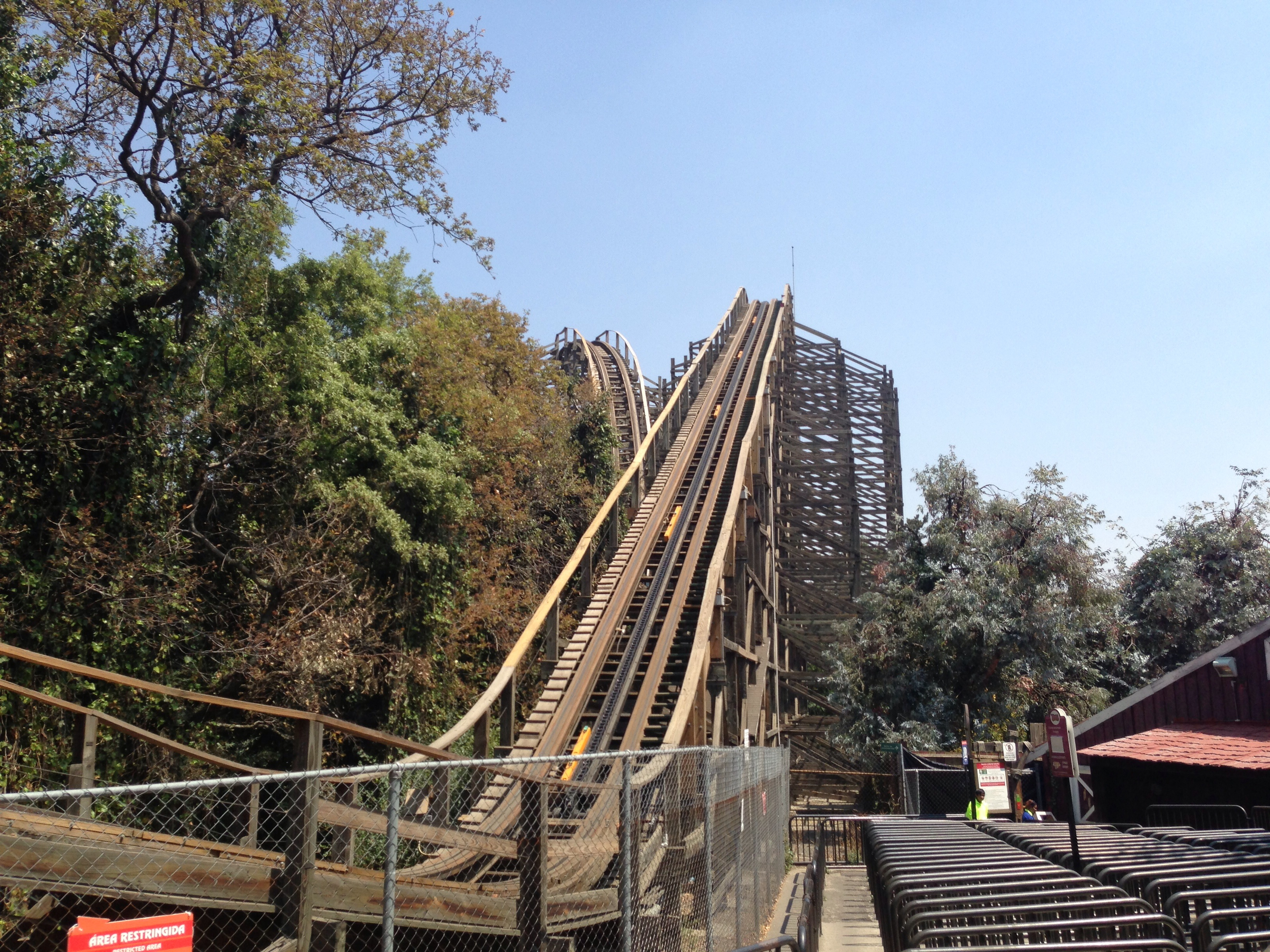
Medusa lift hill in 2013.

On 5 May 1999, Premier Parks (later renamed Six Flags) announced the acquisition of Reino Aventura in Mexico. On 8 December 1999, it was announced Reino Aventura would be rebranded Six Flags México in time for the 2000 season. As part of this process Premier Parks would add 13 new rides, including a wooden roller coaster named Medusa. On June 2, 2000, Medusa officially opened to the public along with the refurbished and rebranded park.

In late 2009, Six Flags Over Texas closed their Texas Giant wooden roller coaster for a $10 million renovation which took more than a year to complete. Idaho-firm Rocky Mountain Construction replaced the wooden track with a new steel I-Box track, retaining a wooden support structure. The refurbishment was ultimately a success with "resoundingly positive reviews from riders". The park's parent company, Six Flags, immediately began looking for other rides in its chain which would benefit from a similar overhaul.

For the 2012 season parts of the Medusa's track was covered with Rocky Mountain Construction Topper Track.

On 1 July 2013, Six Flags México announced that Medusa would be closing on 18 August 2013, leading to speculation that the ride may be next to receive a transformation from wood to I-Box steel track by Rocky Mountain Construction. Following the ride's closure, work began on removing the wooden roller coaster track.

On 29 August 2013, Six Flags officially announced that Rocky Mountain Construction would be converting the wooden roller coaster to a steel track, in a similar style to that done on the New Texas Giant and Iron Rattler. The refurbished attraction opened on 14 June 2014.

On 1 September 2016, it was announced that Medusa Steel Coaster would receive the New Revolution virtual reality upgrade in 2017. Many other Six Flags coasters received this in 2016.

== Characteristics ==
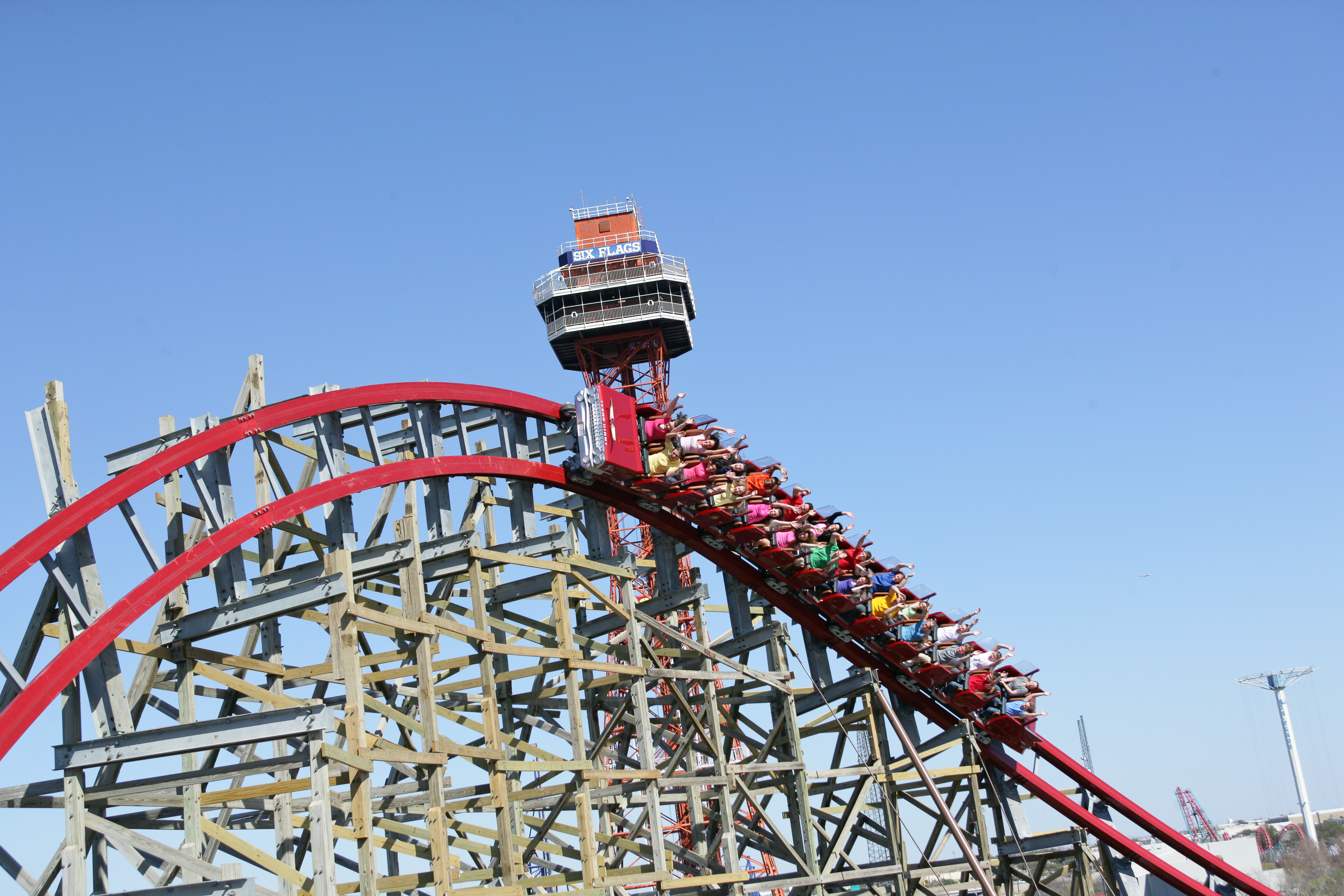
Medusa Steel Coaster features overbanked turns and steel track similar to that on the Texas Giant at Six Flags Over Texas (pictured)

Medusa Steel Coaster is located in the Pueblo Vaquero area of Six Flags México. It is Rocky Mountain Construction's third installation of I-Box track, and the second to feature an inversion. It operates with two trains manufactured by Rocky Mountain Construction. Each train is made up of six cars which seat riders in two rows of two. Riders are restrained by a lap bar.

The table below compares the original Medusa, with the updated Medusa Steel Coaster ride.

Statistic	Medusa	Medusa Steel Coaster
Years	2000–2013	2014-present
Manufacturer	Custom Coasters International	Rocky Mountain Construction
Designer	Custom Coasters International	Alan Schilke
Track	Wood	Steel
Height	32 m or 105 ft	36 m or 118 ft
Length	955.8 m or 3,136 ft	914.4 m or 3,000 ft
Speed	88.5 km/h or 55.0 mph	93.3 km/h or 58.0 mph
Inversions	0	3
Max vertical angle	50°	54°
Restraints	Lap bar	Lap bar

== Ride experience ==
Once the train departs from the station, riders would travel to the left leading to the chain lift hill. Once climbing the 36-metre-tall (118 ft) hill, the train would make a right down the first inversion zero-g roll heading down the first hill at an angle of 54°. After the main drop the riders would experience going through several drops, helices, many airtime moments and two more zero-g rolls, until the train returns to the station.

== Reception ==
Medusa Steel Coaster has generally been well-received by enthusiasts. Eugenio Derbez, Danna Paola, Drake Bell, and several other celebrities of Mexico all took part of the opening celebration on 14 June 2014 and gave positive reviews of the steel roller coaster.

Prior to the conversion to steel, Medusa never ranked in the Amusement Today's Golden Ticket Awards among wooden coasters. After the renovation in 2014, Medusa Steel Coaster was not ranked the first year either, nor was it mentioned in the top candidates for best new ride. However in 2015, it debuted in a tie at the 49th position, and climbed as high as 37 in 2017.

Golden Ticket Awards: Top steel Roller Coasters
Year									1998	1999
Ranking									–	–
Year	2000	2001	2002	2003	2004	2005	2006	2007	2008	2009
Ranking	–	–	–	–	–	–	–	–	–	–
Year	2010	2011	2012	2013	2014	2015	2016	2017	2018	2019
Ranking	–	–	–	–	–	49	40	37	–	–
Year	2020	2021	2022	2023	2024	2025	2026			
Ranking	N/A	–	–	–	–	–	–			
