= Six Flags México =

Amusement park

- Previously known as Reino Aventura (1982-1999)
- Logo used since 2025

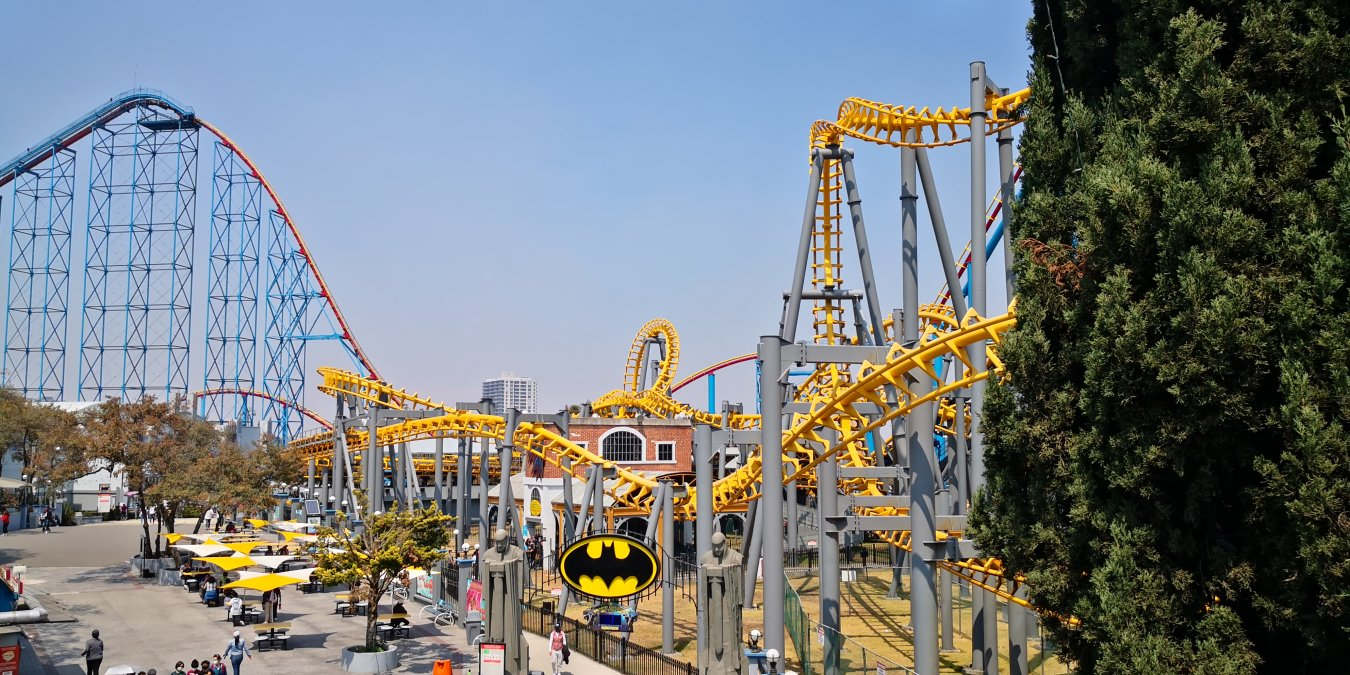
- Superman El Último Escape and Batman: The Ride in 2022
- Interactive map of Six Flags México
- Location: Mexico City, Mexico
- Coordinates: 19.295°N 99.209°W
- Status: Operating
- Opened: March 3, 1982; 44 years ago
- Owner: Six Flags
- Operating season: Year-round
- Area: 110 acres (0.45 km^{2})

Attractions
- Total: 50
- Roller coasters: 10
- Water rides: 2
- Website: sixflags.com/mexico

Six Flags México is an amusement park located in the Tlalpan forest and borough, on the southern edge of Mexico City, Mexico. It is owned and operated by Six Flags, and is the most visited theme park in Latin America with 2.8 million annual visitors. It was previously known as Reino Aventura when it was Mexican-owned and featured the orca whale Keiko (from the movie Free Willy) as its principal attraction.

== History ==
Reino Aventura (Spanish for "Adventure Kingdom") opened its gates on March 3, 1982, as the largest theme park in Latin America. Its mascot was Cornelio, a purple cartoon dragon. In 1992, in response to declining attendance, the park was closed for an extensive remodeling and expansion. The park would reopen on July 3, 1993, with the new moniker El Nuevo Reino Aventura (The New Adventure Kingdom). The 1993 season brought several new rides such as Río Salvaje (Wild River, a raft ride), Viaje Inesperado (Unexpected Trip, a motion simulator), and Roller Skater (a Vekoma Kiddie Coaster). That same year, the feature film Free Willy was shot in the park. This attracted numerous animal rights organizations, which pressured the park to free the orca Keiko. After Keiko left, Cornelio the dragon became once again the Park's official mascot.

In 1999, Premier Parks bought Reino Aventura for an estimated $59 million. Under new administration, the park's name was officially changed to Six Flags Mexico. Twenty new attractions were added to the park, including Batman: The Ride, Kilahuea, and Medusa, a wooden roller coaster. It opened its gates again on April 14, 2000, as Six Flags México.

Since rebranding to Six Flags México, the park has sceral new roller coasters including Superman el Último Escape (2004), The Dark Knight (2009), The Joker (2013), Medusa Steel Coaster (2014), and Wonder Woman Coaster (2018).

In 2011, the park opened Terminator X: A Laser Battle for Salvation, an indoor themed laser tag attraction. On September 6, 2012, Six Flags México announced The Joker a Gerstlauer spinning coaster for the 2013 season. The Joker was relocated from Six Flags Discovery Kingdom as Pandemonium from 2008-2012. Also announced is two new events in October and December, Festival del Terror and Christmas in the Park, both starting in 2012.

In June 2013, Six Flags México announced on Facebook that an attraction at the park will be closing at the end of summer 2013. On July 1, 2013, Cowboy Stunt Show was announced for the park. On August 29, 2013, Six Flags officially announced the renovation of Medusa to Medusa Steel Coaster that will feature steel tracks and multiple inversions for the 2014 season. On August 28, 2014, it was announced that the park would get a Funtime Starflyer named Skyscreamer in 2015. On September 3, 2015, it was announced that the park would get Justice League: Battle For Metropolis 4D in 2016, like Six Flags Great America. On September 1, 2016, it was announced that the park would get new things in 2017. They announced The New Revolution Virtual Reality Coaster and Medusa Steel Coaster, a Mardi Gras festival, and a new water park called Hurricane Harbor.

== Current attractions ==
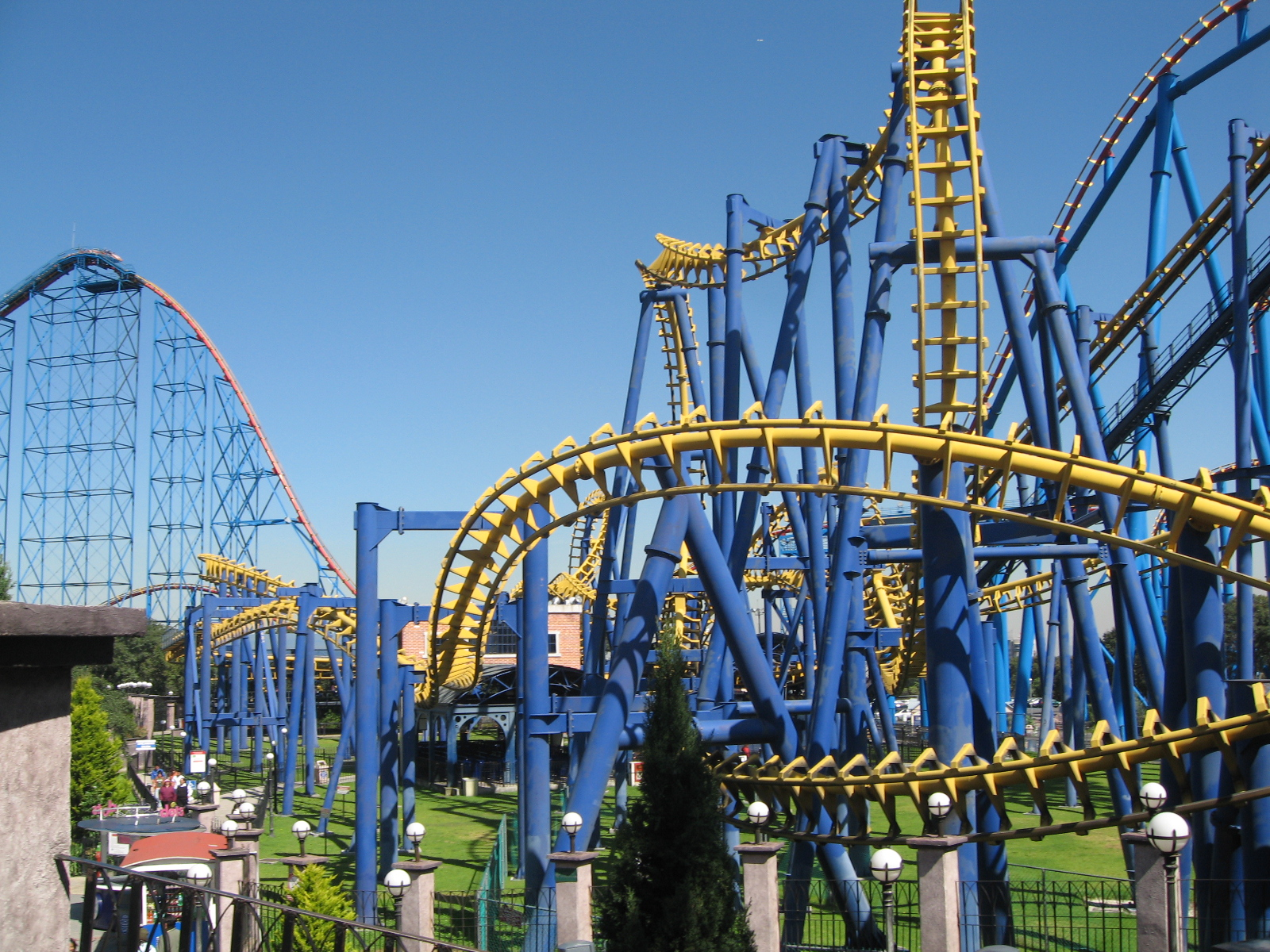
Batman: The Ride

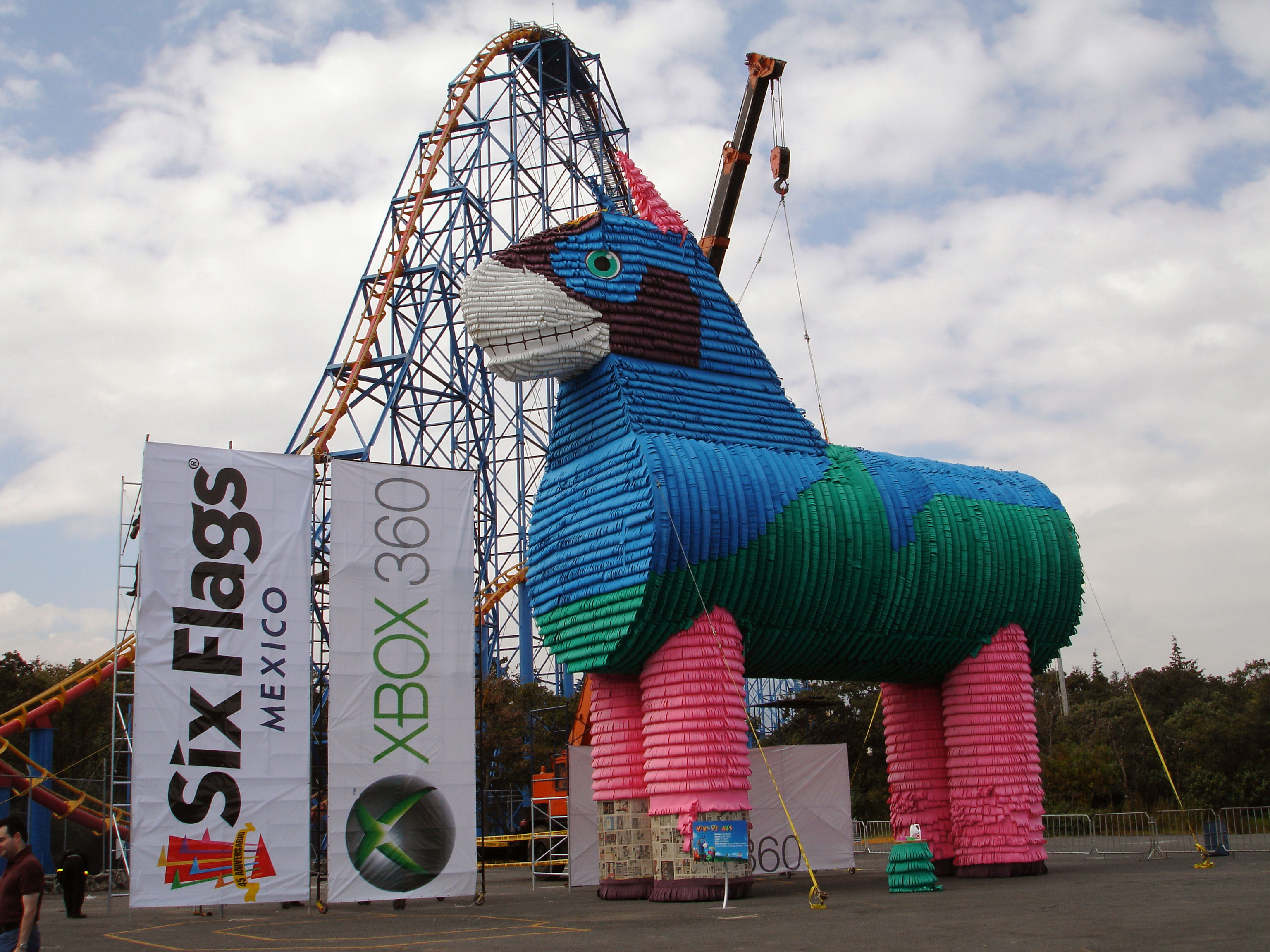
Horstacio, the world's former largest Piñata

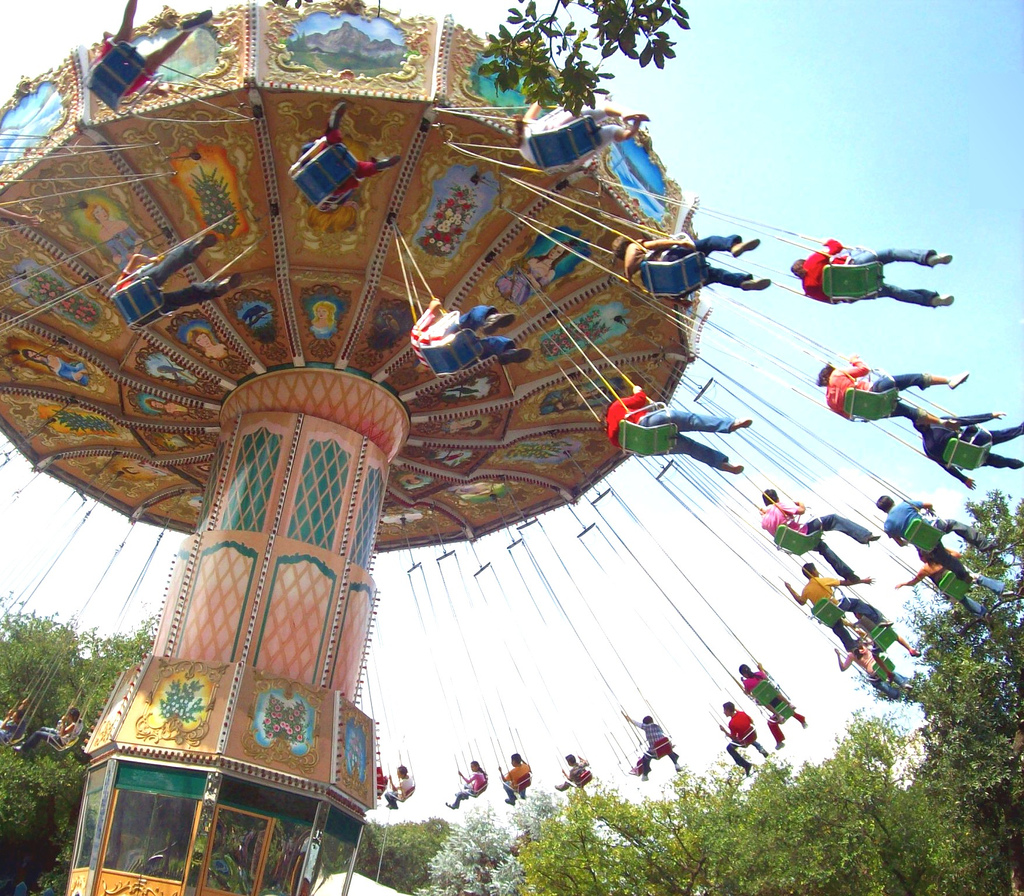
Vuelo Alpino

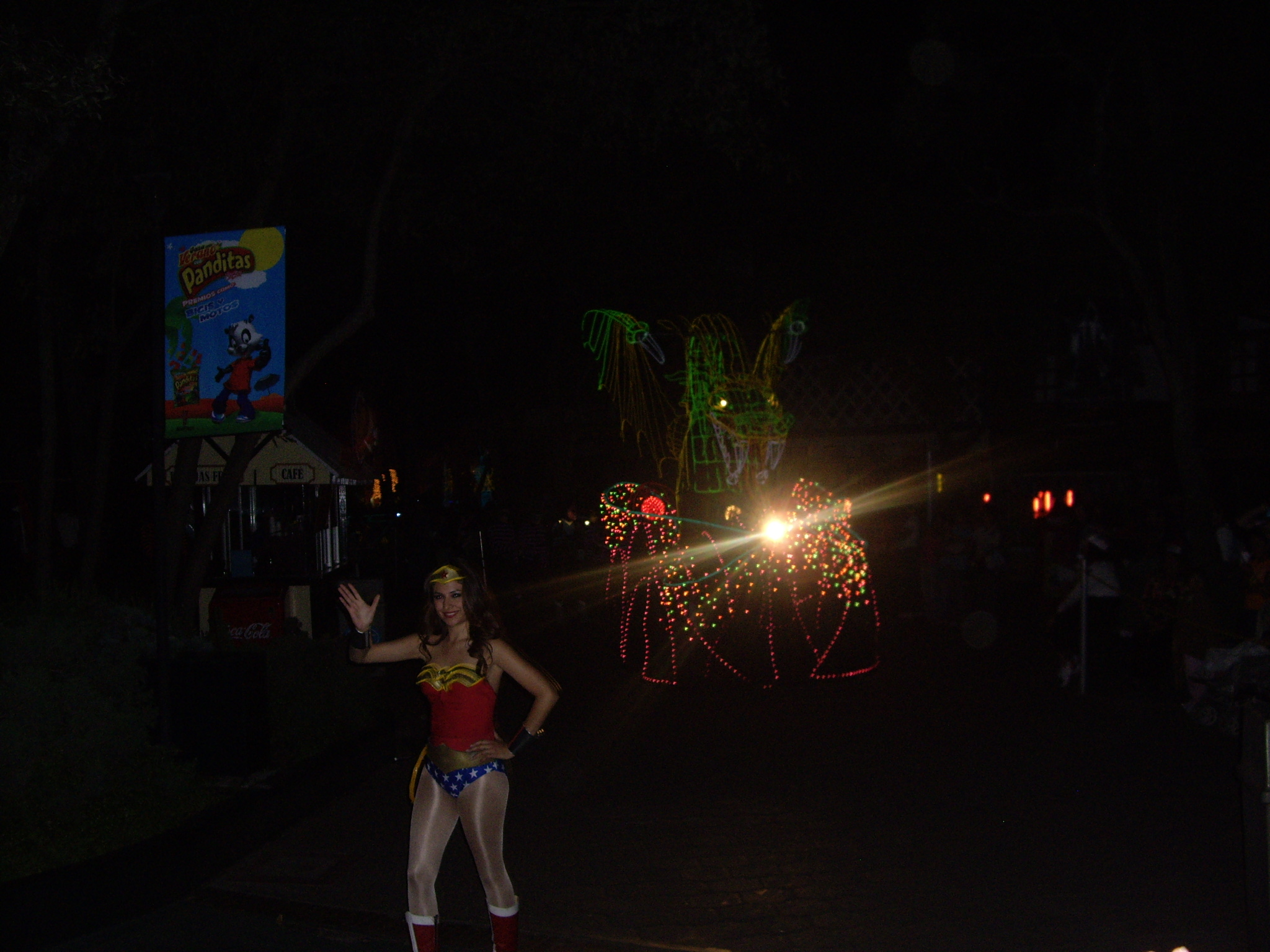
Wonder Woman and Chinese dragon car from Magic Light Parade

=== Pueblo Mexicano (Mexican Village) ===
Name	Opened	Manufacturer	Type	Notes
Río Salvaje	1992	Intamin	River rapids ride	
Superman El Último Escape	2004	Morgan	Hyper Coaster	
La Fiesta de las Tazas	2000	SBF Visa Group	Tea Cups	

=== Pueblo Francés (French Village) ===
Name	Opened	Manufacturer	Type	Notes
Le Grand Carrousell	2000	Bertazzon	Double Decker Carousel	
The Joker	2013	Gerstlauer	Spinning Coaster	Relocated from Six Flags Discovery Kingdom as Pandemonium

=== Pueblo Suizo (Swiss Village) ===
Name	Opened	Manufacturer	Type	Notes
Expresso Musical	1990	Bertazzon	Musik Express	
Sling Shot	2013	Funtime	Sling Shot 60 m	

=== Pueblo Polinesio (Polynesian Village) ===
Name	Opened	Manufacturer	Type	Notes
Kilahuea	2000	S&S Worldwide	Combo Tower	
Tsunami	1981	Zierer	Tivoli Large Coaster	Formerly Catarina Voladora, Reino Aventura's first roller coaster

=== Villa Hollywood ===
Name	Opened	Manufacturer	Type	Notes
Batgirl Batarang	1988	Vekoma	Boomerang	The first Boomerang to open to the public and the second to be built.
Rock & Roll	2000	Wieland Schwarzkopf	Polyp	
X-Flight	2015	Skycoaster Inc.	Sky Coaster 60m	Relocated from Six Flags Hurricane Harbor Arlington as Caribbean Swing.
CraZanity	2020	Zamperla	Giga Discovery	

==== DC Universe ====
Name	Opened	Manufacturer	Type	Notes
Batman: The Ride	2000	Vekoma	Suspended Looping Coaster	Only Vekoma SLC themed after Batman.
Justice League: Battle for Metropolis	2016	Sally Corporation	4D Dark Ride	
Supergirl Sky Flight; Formerly SkyScreamer	2015	Funtime	Star Flyer	
Teen Titans Turbo	2000	J&J Amusements	Go Karts	Formerly Hollywood Speedtrack
Wonder Woman Coaster	2018	S&S Worldwide	4D Free Fly Coaster	

=== DC Super Friends ===
Name	Opened	Manufacturer	Type	Notes
Los Supervillanos de Gotham City	1982	Zierer	Wave Swinger	Formerly Vuelo Alpino
Superman: Krypton Coaster	1993	Vekoma	Junior Coaster	Formerly Roller
El Pingüino	1983	Zamperla	Mini Tea Cups	Formerly Tamborcitos
The Dark Knight Coaster	2009	Mack Rides	Indoor Wild Mouse Coaster	Originally intended for Six Flags New England.
Batman Baticopteros	2019	Zamperla	Aerial Ride	
DC Super Hero Girls	2019	Zamperla	Ferris Wheel Fiesta Baloon	Themed to DC Super Hero Girls.
The Joker y Harley Quinn	2019	Zamperla	Rockin' Tug	

=== Pueblo Vaquero (Cowboy Village) ===
Name	Opened	Manufacturer	Type	Notes
Rueda India	1982	Intamin/Waagner-Biro	Ferris Wheel	
Ruleta	1982	Chance Rides	Trabant	
Medusa Steel Coaster	2014	Rocky Mountain Construction	Hybrid Coaster	Formerly Medusa

=== Bugs Bunny Boomtown ===
Name	Opened	Manufacturer	Type	Notes
Los Globos de Elmer	1993	Zamperla	Samba Balloons	Formerly Globo Bobo
ACME Trucking Company	1982	Zamperla	Kiddie Convoy	Formerly Convoy del Carrecaminos
Marvin el Marciano: Aventura Espacial	1993	Zamperla	Crazy Plane Ride	Formerly Reino Jet. Name is Spanish for "Marvin the Martian: Space Adventure".
Pato Lucas Blaster	2019	Zamperla	Watermania	Spanish for "Daffy Duck Blaster".
Looney Tunes Circo Express	1993	Zamperla	Circus Train Ride	
La Mini Torre de Sylvestre	2000	Zamperla	Jumpin' Star	
El Tornado de Taz	2019	Zamperla	Lolli Swing	Spanish for "Taz Tornado".
El Campo de Aventuras de Looney Tunes	2019	Six Flags México	Kiddie Playground	Name is Spanish for "Looney Tunes Adventure Camp".
La Escuela de Vuelo de Sam Bigotes	1982	Zamperla	Red Baron	Formerly Barón Rojo

== Former attractions ==
Name	Opened	Closed	Manufacturer	Type	Notes
Medusa	2000	2013	Custom Coasters International	Wooden Coaster	Converted into Medusa Steel Coaster
Canoa Krakatoa	1982	2012	Zierer	Viking	Made space for The Joker
Huracán	1993	2019	Vekoma	Waikiki Wave Super Flip	
Vudú	2000	2019	SBF Visa Group	Dance Party	
Catapulta	2000	2019	Chance Rides	Double Inverter	
Curandero	2000	2018	SBF Visa Group	Space Gun	
La Mansión de la Llorona	1982	2005	Vekoma	Ghost Train	
Hollywood Star	1982	1999	Frank Hrubetz	Paratrooper	
Cíclope	1982	1994	Huss Rides	Enterprise	
Space Shot	1995	1999	S&S	Space Shot	World's first Space Shot, prototype with only 8 seats. Replaced with a higher capacity version.
Tren Santa Fe	2000	2008	??	Train Ride	
Viaje Inesperado/ Bob Esponja 3D	1993	2011	iWerks	Turbo Theater	Bob Esponja 3D was a Spanish-dubbed version of SpongeBob SquarePants 4-D.
Aquaman SplashDown	1993	2024	Hopkins Rides	Shoot The Chutes	Formerly Splash
Piñas Locas	2000	2022	Huss	Crazy Pineapple	

== Accidents ==
Carlos Joel Garza Marines, 15, fell ten meters from the "Rueda India" and broke his legs in February, 22 2019.

Abdiel Alexey, an 18-year-old visitor, suffered a head injury after flying out of an unsecured seat on El Pingüino (The Penguin) in November 2020. Original reports had been that he died from the injury in the hospital, but it was later reported that he was recovering.
