= Augeas (software) =

Configuration-management library

augeas
- Stable release: 1.14.1 / 15 July 2023; 2 years ago
- Repository: github.com/hercules-team/augeas
- Written in: C, shell script, LaTeX, Cascading Style Sheets, Automake, Autoconf, Vimscript, Perl
- Operating system: Unix-like
- Size: 1.8MB
- Type: Configuration management
- License: GNU LGPL 2.1 or later
- Website: augeas.net

Augeas is a free software configuration-management library, written in the C programming language. It is licensed under the terms of the GNU Lesser General Public License.

Augeas uses programs called lenses (in reference to the Harmony Project) to map a filesystem to an XML tree which can then be parsed using an XPath syntax, using a bidirectional transformation. Writing such lenses extends the amount of files Augeas can parse.

== Bindings ==
Augeas has bindings for Python, Ruby, OCaml, Perl, Haskell, Java, PHP, and Tcl.

== Programs using augeas ==
- Certbot, ACME client
- Puppet provides an Augeas module which makes use of the Ruby bindings
- SaltStack provides an Augeas module which makes use of the python bindings
