= Batgirl Batarang =

Boomerang roller coaster

- Previously known as Boomerang (1988-1991)/(2000-2024) and Escorpión (1992-1999)
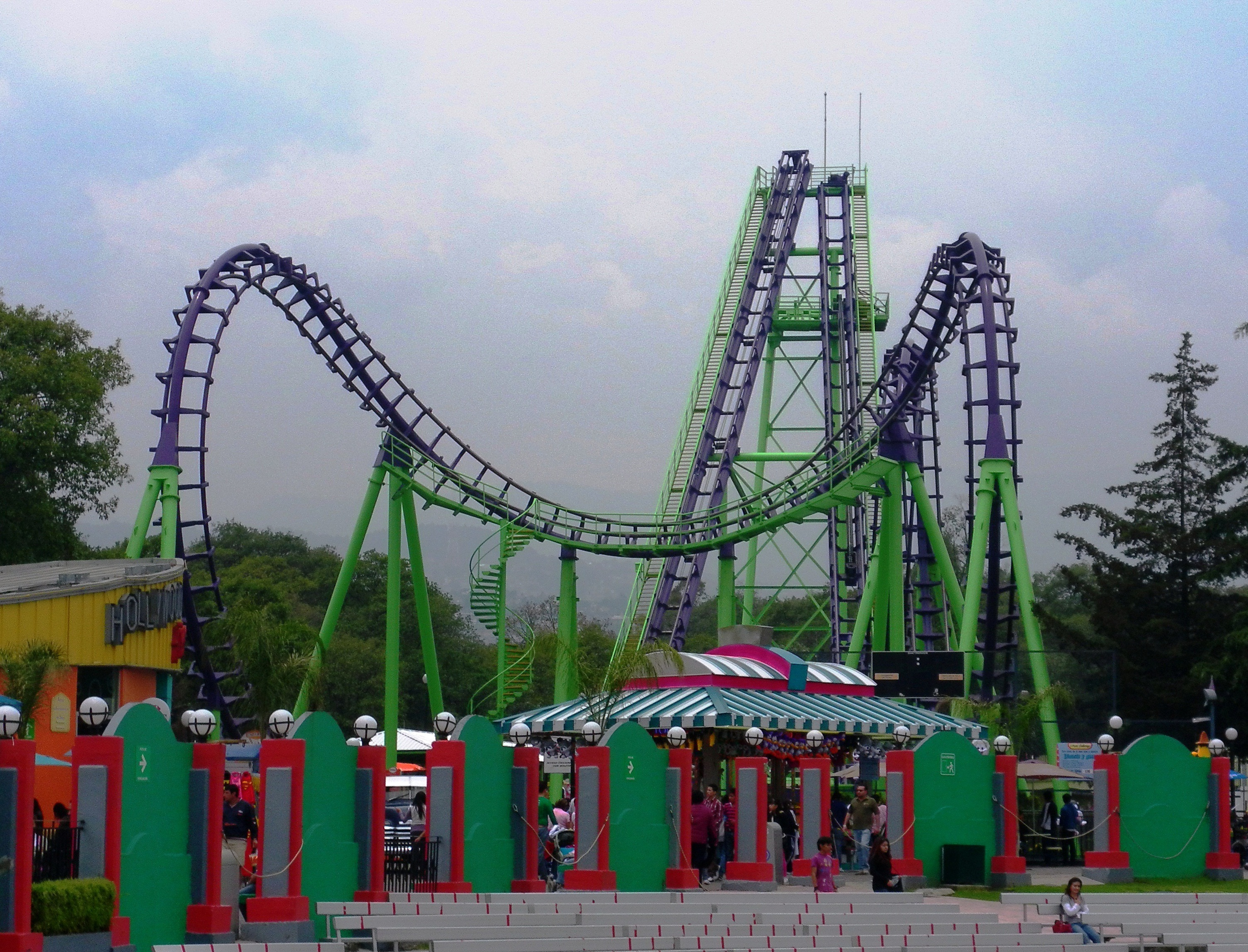

Six Flags México
- Park section: Villa Hollywood
- Coordinates: 19.293406°N 99.207814°W
- Status: Operating
- Opening date: 1988

Rafaela Padilla
- Status: Removed
- Opening date: 1984
- Closing date: 1986

General statistics
- Type: Steel – Boomerang
- Manufacturer: Vekoma
- Designer: Arrow Dynamics
- Model: Boomerang
- Height: 116.5 ft (35.5 m)
- Length: 935 ft (285 m)
- Speed: 47 mph (76 km/h)
- Inversions: 3
- Duration: 1:48
- Max vertical angle: 65°
- Capacity: 760 riders per hour
- G-force: 5.2
- Height restriction: 48 in (122 cm)
- Trains: Single train with 7 cars. Riders are arranged 2 across in 2 rows for a total of 28 riders per train.
- Fast Lane available
- Batgirl Batarang at RCDB

Batgirl Batarang (formerly known as Boomerang and Escorpión) is a shuttle roller coaster operating at Six Flags México since 1988. Originally built by Vekoma in 1984, it was the first of the company's Boomerang model.

== History ==
Boomerang first started at the former Rafaela Padilla in Puebla, Puebla in Mexico as Boomerang. It was built in 1984 as the first Boomerang ever built by Vekoma. In 1986, the roller coaster was removed from the park, being relocated to Reino Aventura in 1988 and keeping the same name. In 1992, Boomerang was renamed Escorpión and rethemed to a scorpion. In 1999, Six Flags purchased Reino Aventura, which became Six Flags México. In 2000, Escorpión was renamed back to Boomerang. In 2024, Six Flags announced that the roller coaster would be renamed once more, this time to Batgirl Batarang, based on the superhero of the same name.

== Ride experience ==
Batgirl Batarang is the first of more than fifty identical Boomerang roller coasters made by Vekoma. The ride begins with the train being pulled backward out of the station and up the 116.5 ft (35.5 m) lift hill by a catch car. At the top of the lift hill, the train is released and speeds through the station, where it enters a cobra roll. Exiting the cobra roll, the train enters a vertical loop before ascending a chain lift hill. When the train reaches the top, the lift disengages, and the train falls backward through the inversions and tunnel before returning to the station. One cycle of the roller coaster takes about a minute and forty-eight seconds to complete.
