= Bidirectionalization =

In computer science, bidirectionalization refers to the process of given a source-to-view transformation (automatically) finding a mapping from the original source and an updated view to an updated source.

== See also ==
- Bidirectional transformation
- Inverse function
- Reversible computing
- View (SQL)
