= Moody Peak =

Mountain peak in Oates Land, Antarctica

Moody Peak (78°22′S 158°35′E) is a peak over 1,800 metres (5,900 ft) high marking the northern limit of the Boomerang Range in Antarctica. It was named by the Advisory Committee on Antarctic Names in 1964 for Junior L. Moody, aviation boatswain's mate, U.S. Navy, in charge of loading and of loading aircraft at McMurdo Station in 1959–60.
