= Alligator Peak, British Columbia =

Mountain in Canada

Alligator Peak is located just southwest of Twin Lakes. This forested massif has been subjected to heavy logging and there are logging roads on all sides. Access is via logging roads north of Hatzic, past Davis Lake to the Lost Creek drainage. From a road that runs to Twin Lakes, take a west fork that runs almost right to the summit.

Alligator Peak was named after Alligator Point on Stave Lake.

Specifics	Info
Name	Alligator Peak
Height	822m
Height Report Prominence	2697 feet
Line Parent	372 m
Terepocki Peak	6 km away, at bearing 44 degrees
Ranges	Pacific Cordillera / Coast Mountains / Pacific Ranges / Chehalis Group
Location	49.34611°N 122.26500°W 49:20:46, -122:15:54 10U 553386 5466192 (6 km N of Davis Lake). (24 km N of Mission).
NTS Mapsheet	092.G.08 Located on the east side of Stave Lake near Alligator point and Flat Point
