= Boomerang (programming language) =

Text-oriented programming language

- Developer: Nate Foster, Benjamin C. Pierce, and Michael Greenberg88
- First appeared: 2008; 18 years ago
- Stable release: 0.2 / September 2, 2009; 17 years ago
- OS: Linux, Mac OS X
- Website: www.engineering.upenn.edu/~harmony/

Influenced by
- OCaml

Influenced
- XSLT

Boomerang is a programming language for writing lenses—well-behaved bidirectional transformations —that operate on ad-hoc, textual data formats.

Boomerang grew out of the Harmony generic data synchronizer, which grew out of the Unison file synchronization project.
