= Tsunami (roller coaster) =

Defunct roller coaster

- Previously known as Thriller at Gröna Lund, Taz's Texas Tornado and Texas Tornado at Six Flags AstroWorld and Zonga at Six Flags Discovery Kingdom
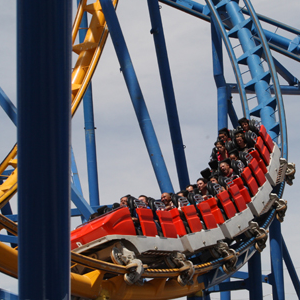
- Up-close shot of Tsunami going through the loops

Feria Nacional de San Marcos
- Coordinates: 21.8595°N 102.3197°W
- Status: Removed
- Opening date: April 27, 2008
- Closing date: November 9, 2014

Six Flags Discovery Kingdom
- Coordinates: 38.1386°N 122.2310°W
- Status: Removed
- Opening date: April 25, 2003
- Closing date: 2004
- Replaced by: Pandemonium

Six Flags AstroWorld
- Coordinates: 29.6750°N 95.4068°W
- Status: Removed
- Opening date: March 14, 1998
- Closing date: 2000
- Replaced by: Swat

Gröna Lund
- Coordinates: 59.3227°N 18.0961°E
- Status: Removed
- Opening date: 1996
- Closing date: 1996

General statistics
- Type: Steel
- Manufacturer: Anton Schwarzkopf
- Designer: Werner Stengel
- Height: 115 ft (35 m)
- Drop: 98 ft (30 m)
- Speed: 55 mph (89 km/h)
- Height restriction: 55 in (140 cm)
- Tsunami at RCDB

Tsunami was a steel roller coaster manufactured by Anton Schwarzkopf and located at the San Marcos National Fair in Mexico. The coaster was previously located at Six Flags Discovery Kingdom as Zonga, Six Flags AstroWorld as "Texas Tornado", and operated for 10 years on the German traveling funfair circuit as "Thriller." After its time at Marine World, it was sold to the San Marcos National Fair, where it last operated.

== History ==
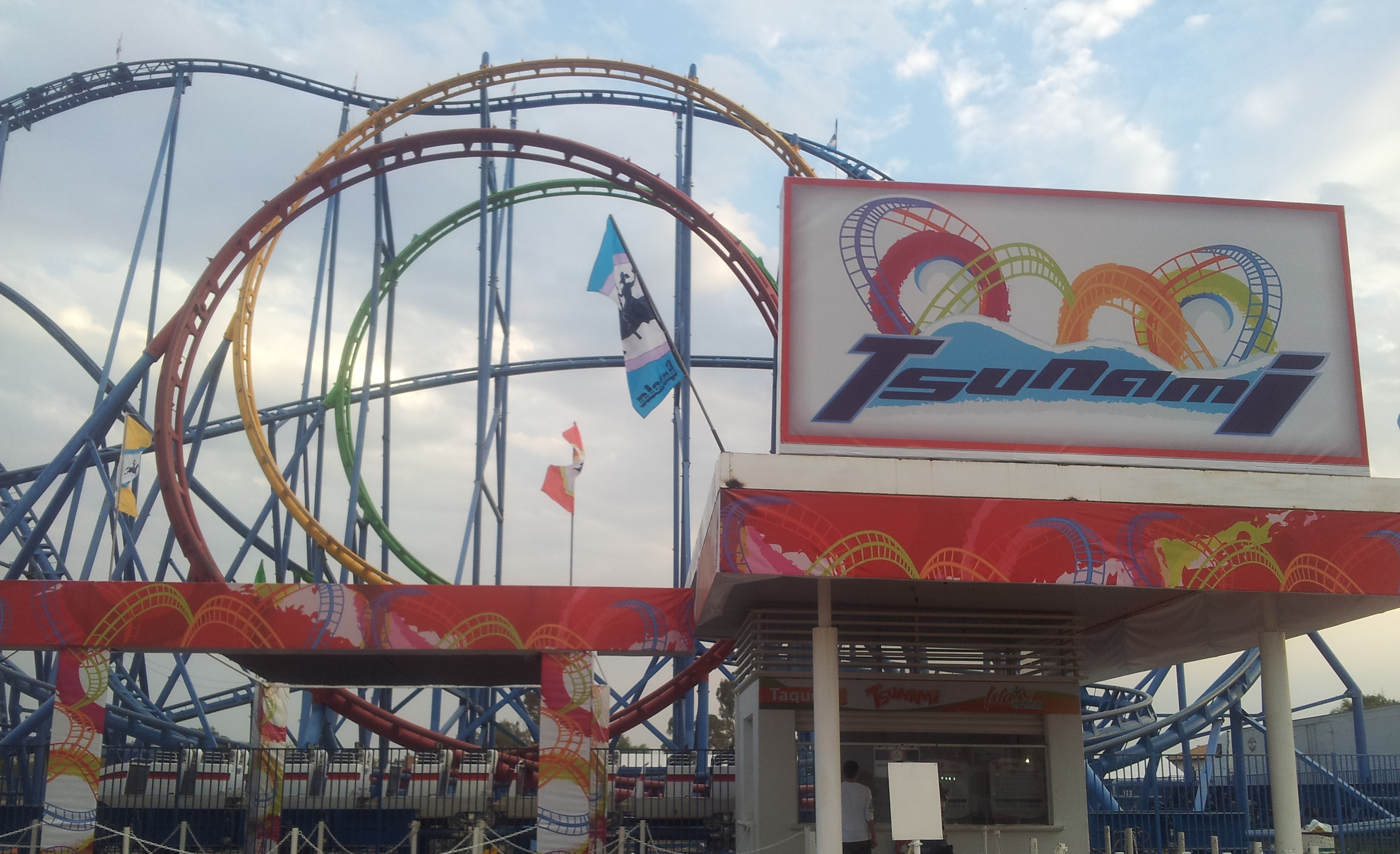

This coaster debuted as "Thriller" on the German funfair circuit in 1986, under the ownership of Oscar Bruch and toured the country until 1997, with a short spell on loan to the Gröna Lund amusement park for the 1996 season. Its last fair was the Hamburger Dom of November/December 1997, after which it was taken to the now-defunct Six Flags AstroWorld in Houston, Texas.

It was assembled at Six Flags AstroWorld in Houston late in 1997. The roller coaster opened at Six Flags AstroWorld on March 14, 1998 and was renamed Texas Tornado. This coaster had very positive reviews from guests but when summer hit, the heat and humidity seemed to disrupt operation. On very hot days the coaster suffered a lot of downtime. "Texas Tornado" continued to operate there in the 1999 and 2000 seasons with a lot of downtime on the hotter days. It seemed to run decently on milder and cooler days. At the end of the 2000 season, Six Flags decided to remove the ride but it stayed at AstroWorld, standing but not operating, for the 2001 season. Early in 2002, it was moved out of Six Flags AstroWorld and into storage.

In 2003, Texas Tornado was moved to Six Flags Discovery Kingdom and some track modifications were made by Premier Rides. The most significant was increasing the elevation of the first two loops. The effect of this change would be reducing the Thriller's top speed and lowering the g-forces during the first two loops. It was assumed that the mild weather would enable the coaster to run better. It was then renamed Zonga. The trains were also altered with the addition of new shoulder restraints similar to those used on KUKA robocoasters, replacing the accordion restraints and lap bars.

Zonga then operated for two years at Marine World. Unfortunately, operation continued to be inconsistent. Zonga regularly opened about two hours after the park and had frequent breakdowns. The ride wasn't very attractive because of its location (in a distant corner and hidden behind Roar) and appearance. There have been many malfunctions, which eventually led to Six Flags again closing down the ride. There have also been many complaints about the ride being rough. The ride ran for much of the 2004 season but stood silent for the 2005 season and was removed at the beginning of the 2006 season, leaving a large empty concrete area at the front of the park. Zonga was disassembled and moved to the Discovery Kingdom parking lot where it sat throughout the 2006 season. The new coaster for 2008—Tony Hawk's Big Spin, now known as Pandemonium since 2011, was erected on the pad that Zonga used to occupy. In 2012, another new ride replaced Pandemonium, Superman: Ultimate Flight. Zonga's former station was reused as an extended queue area and a PLC room for its successors.

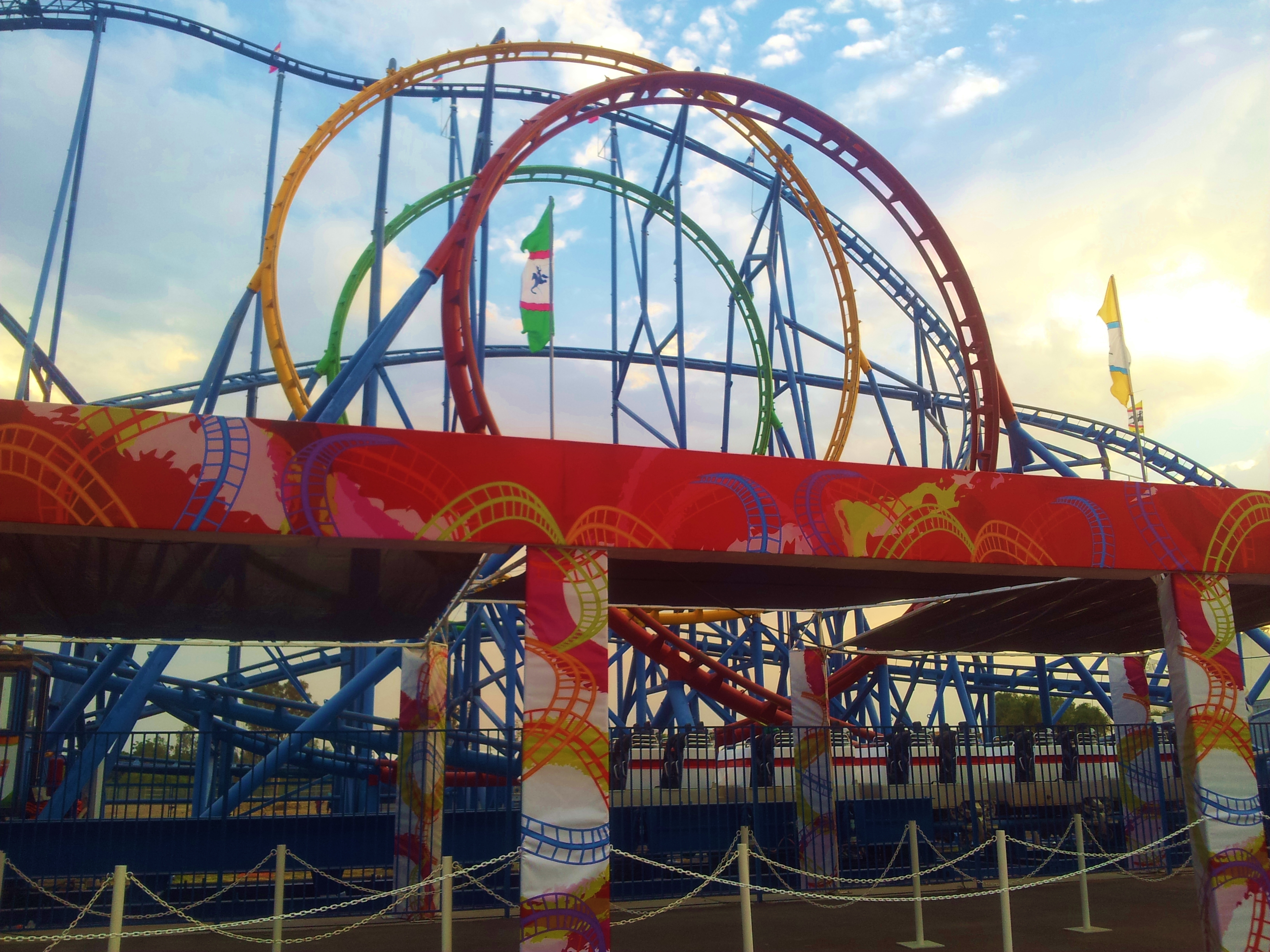
Tsunami at Isla San Marcos

Zonga was then bought in 2008 by the Aguascalientes State government in Mexico, for its use in the famous San Marcos National Fair, where it has been renamed "Tsunami."

== Removal ==
From a news article published by a local newspaper on 23 October 2013, it was announced Tsunami would no longer operate in Mexico after La Feria de San Marcos ended in 2014. An idea was suggested to move the roller coaster to the Bad Wörishofen "Skyline Park" for the 2016 season. However, the move didn't occur and the roller coaster was dismantled in 2016.
