= Superman El Último Escape =

Steel roller coaster at Six Flags México

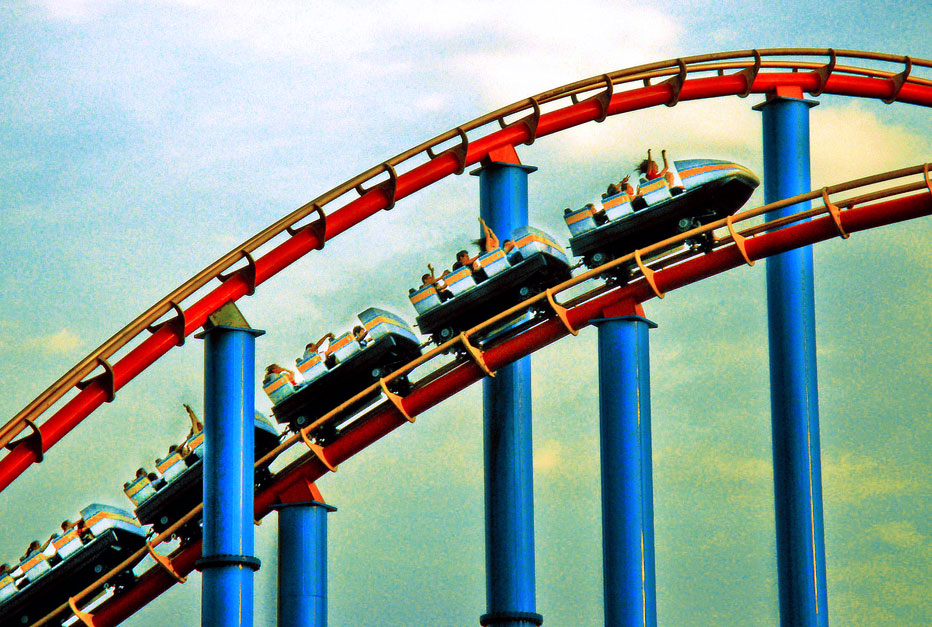

Six Flags México
- Location: Six Flags México
- Park section: Pueblo Mexicano
- Coordinates: 19.295666°N 99.206001°W
- Status: Operating
- Opening date: November 19, 2004

General statistics
- Type: Steel
- Manufacturer: D. H. Morgan Manufacturing
- Model: Hypercoaster
- Track layout: Out and Back
- Lift/launch system: Chain
- Height: 219.8 ft (67.0 m)
- Drop: 205 ft (62 m)
- Length: 5,577.4 ft (1,700.0 m)
- Speed: 74.6 mph (120.1 km/h)
- Inversions: 0
- Duration: 3:04
- Max vertical angle: 60°
- Capacity: 1,600 riders per hour
- Height restriction: 130 cm (4 ft 3 in)
- Trains: 3 trains with 6 cars; riders arranged 2 across in 3 rows for a total of 36 riders per train
- Fast Lane available
- Superman El Último Escape at RCDB

Superman El Último Escape (meaning "Superman: The Ultimate Escape" or "Superman: The Last Escape") is a steel D. H. Morgan Manufacturing roller coaster that opened at Six Flags México on November 19, 2004.

== History ==
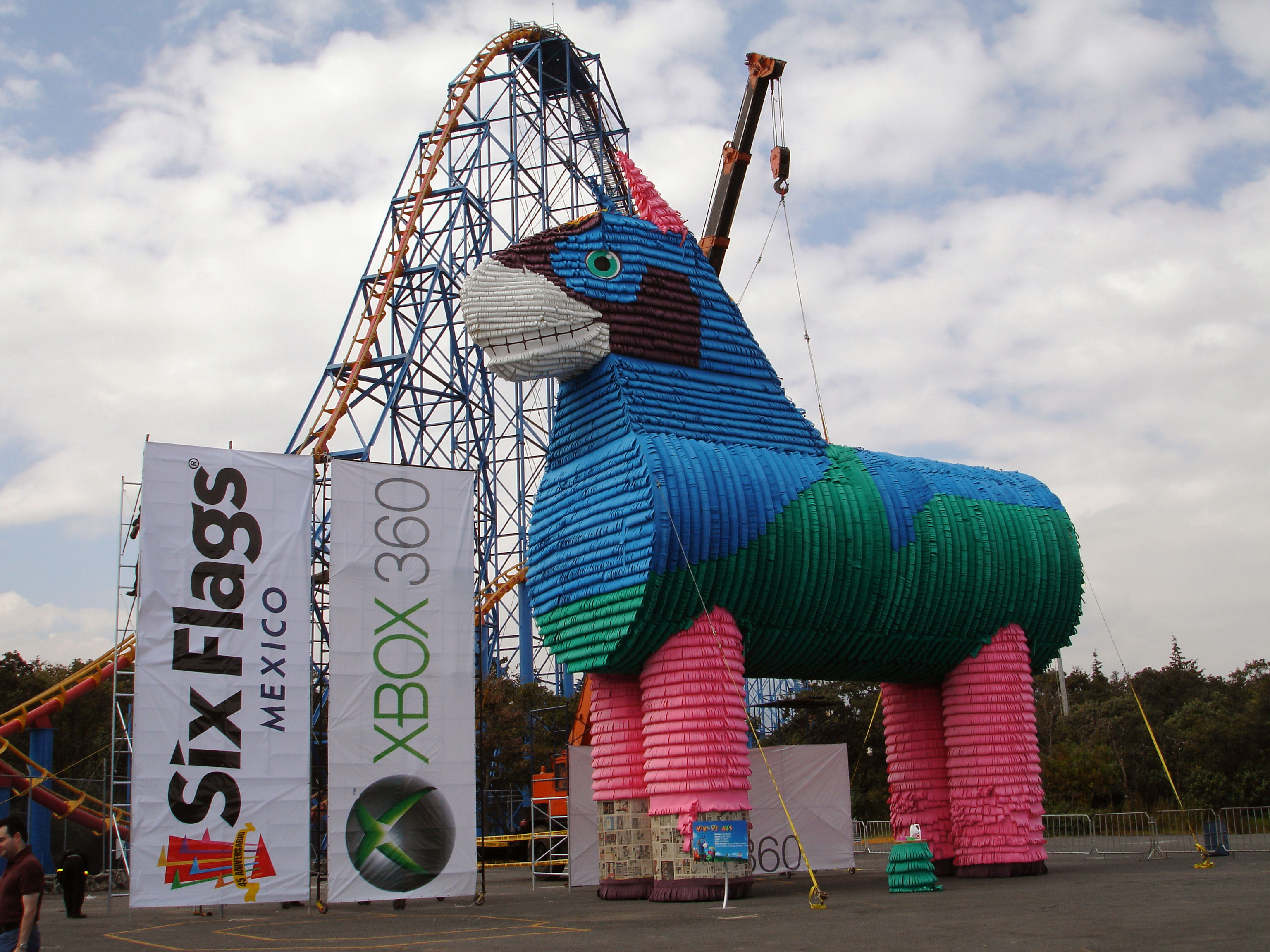
Superman El Último Escape in the background.

Superman El Último Escape was originally supposed to be open in 2002, but this was delayed when construction stopped during a two-year dispute between Six Flags and the Mexican government. Work resumed in 2004 and the ride opened on November 19 of that year.

Upon its opening, Superman El Último Escape set records for the tallest, fastest and longest roller coaster in Latin America.

On December 28, 2020, the Park's Twitter account said that the ride would close-down permanently. This was later revealed to be a prank for the Mexican Day of the Holy Innocents.

== Ride ==
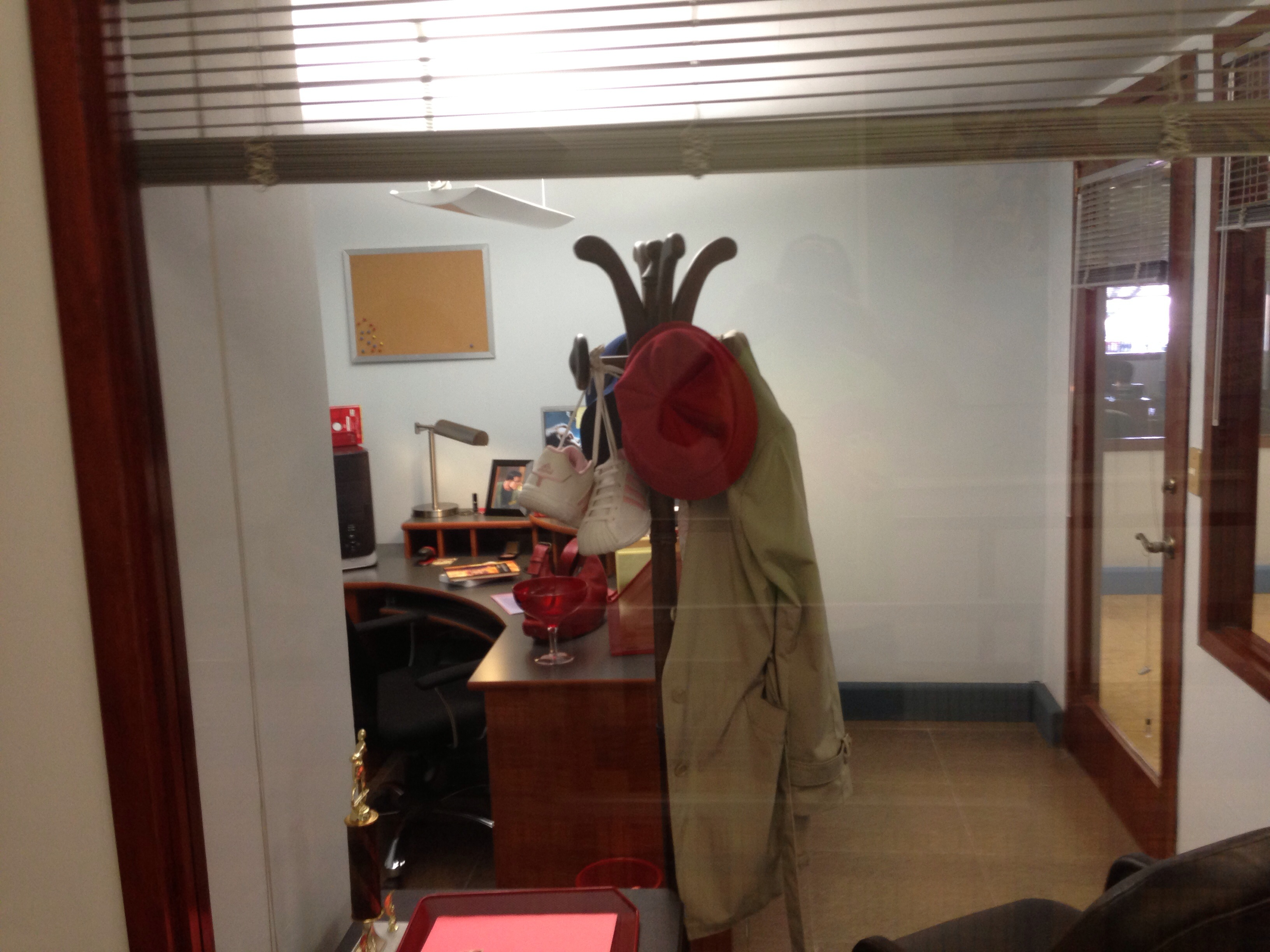
The Daily Planet offices in the queue.

The station and boarding area are in a semi-shaded, forested area with trees. Upon leaving the station, riders travel forward approximately 6 meters (20’) before immediately descending a small, roughly 3–5 m (10-15’) drop. They then ascend a small “bunny hill” which leads into another brief drop, this one curving to the right. The train then climbs up a small slope and enters into a pre-lift hill brake run, to reduce stress on the ride. After a very small drop down and a left-hand turn, riders begin to ascend the 67 m (220’) lift hill.

The ride officially begins as trains plunge down the 62 m (205’) first drop at an angle of about 60°. At the bottom of the drop, the ride reaches its top speed of 112.6 km/h (70 mph) as the trains briefly pass through a covered section of track, ascend the first large camelback airtime hill, and descend down another drop, this time veering to the left. They then climb a smaller slope and come down into a helix section, still veering left. The train then crests the second camelback airtime hill, followed by a drop veering to the right into another small helix; riders then briefly enter into the midcourse brake-run. After descending another drop from the brake section, riders crest a pair of back-to-back airtime bunny-hills. They then turn to the right slightly, then left, and enter the final brakes at the station.

== 2024 incident ==
In 2024, David Ordoñez Castillo, a 17 year old park patron, died following a series of seizures after riding the rollercoaster. According to his family, Castillo reportedly died on the park premises after staff formed a barricade preventing anyone from approaching him until medical services arrived, then his death was not pronounced until arriving at a hospital several minutes later. Six Flags Mexico stated that staff followed park protocols during the incident, and that emergency services arrived promptly.
