= Boomarang Diner =

Restaurant chain in Oklahoma, United States

- Type: Privately held
- Founded: 1992, Muskogee, Oklahoma
- Founder: Charles Degraffenreid
- Headquarters: Shawnee, Oklahoma, United States
- Number of locations: 65 (2026)
- Area served: Oklahoma
- Key people: Ron Degraffenreid and Steve Degraffenreid
- Products: Gourmet Burgers, Sandwiches, Baskets, Dinners and Breakfast
- Website: boomarangdiner.com

Boomarang Diner is a full-service, 1950s-style American restaurant chain specializing in freshly made hamburgers, chicken fried steak, chicken and breakfast served all day. There are currently 61 Boomarang Diner locations, all of which are located in Oklahoma.

Boomarang Diner was named the 2015 Restaurant of the Year by the Made In Oklahoma Coalition.

== History ==
The first Boomarang Diner was opened by Charles Degraffenreid in 1998 in Muskogee, Oklahoma. That original diner, located on Eastside Boulevard, closed in September 2024. Two additional locations were opened in Muskogee before the franchise expanded across the state of Oklahoma. In December 2017, the 50th Boomarang Diner debuted in Holdenville, Oklahoma. In 2018, additional locations opened in Ponca City, Kingfisher and Bartlesville, Oklahoma.

The Boomarang Diner trademark and franchise is owned by Boomarang Diners, Inc., with corporate offices located in Shawnee, Oklahoma.

Charles Degraffenreid's sons, Steve and Ron Degraffenreid, manage the franchise and corporation.

== Decor ==
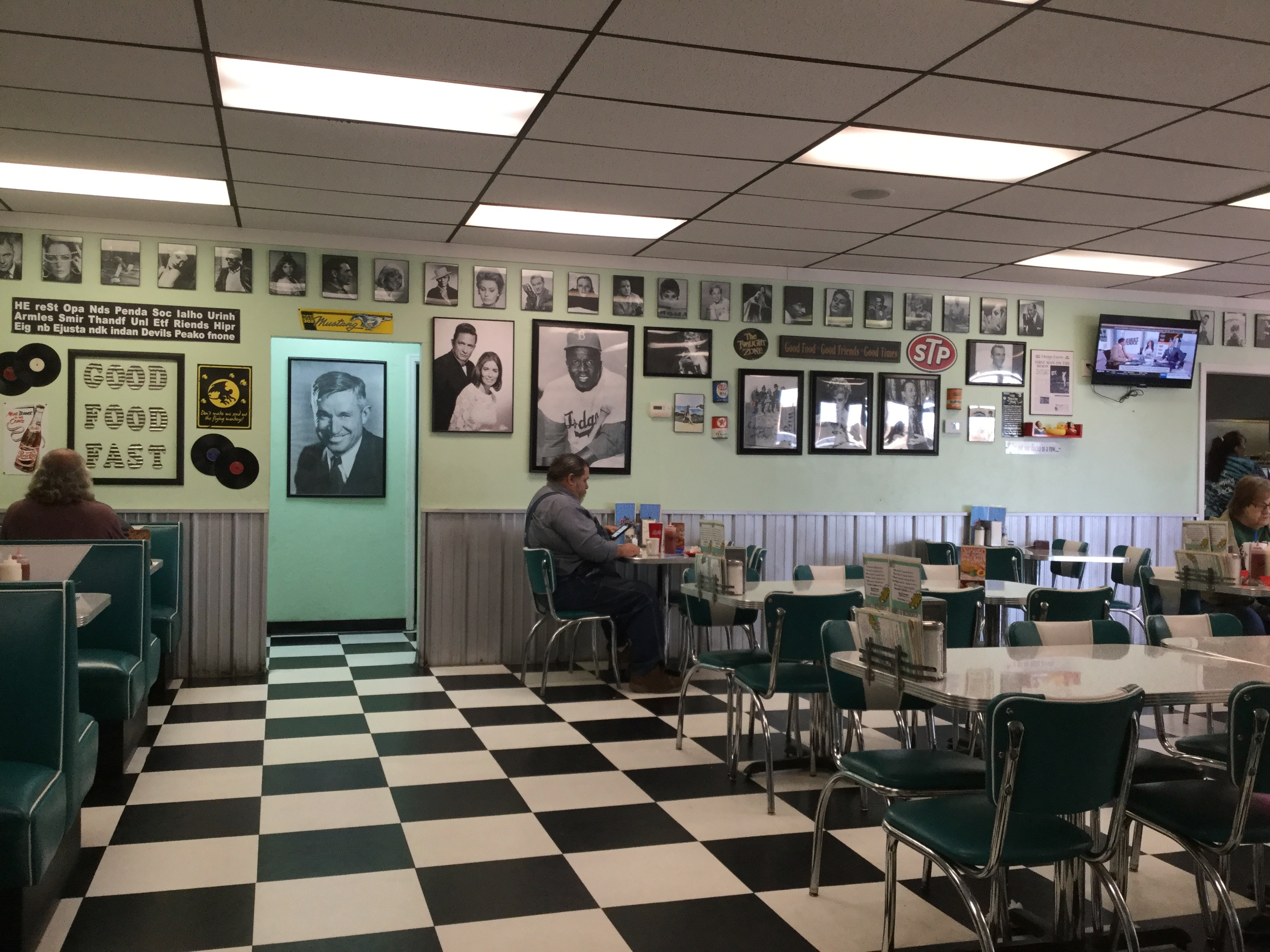
Interior of Boomarang diner in Enid, Oklahoma

Boomarang's decor is reminiscent of the traditional "soda shops" and diners of 1950s. Pop icons of the era, as well as historic photos from local communities, can be found in every location.

== Menu ==
Boomarang Diner is known primarily for its hamburgers and breakfasts, which are made to order all day. Other menu items include chicken, reuben and club sandwiches, salads, and a selection of popular appetizers, such as Pickle-o's, fried mushrooms and bacon cheese fries.
