= Keiko (orca) =

Male orca (1976–2003)

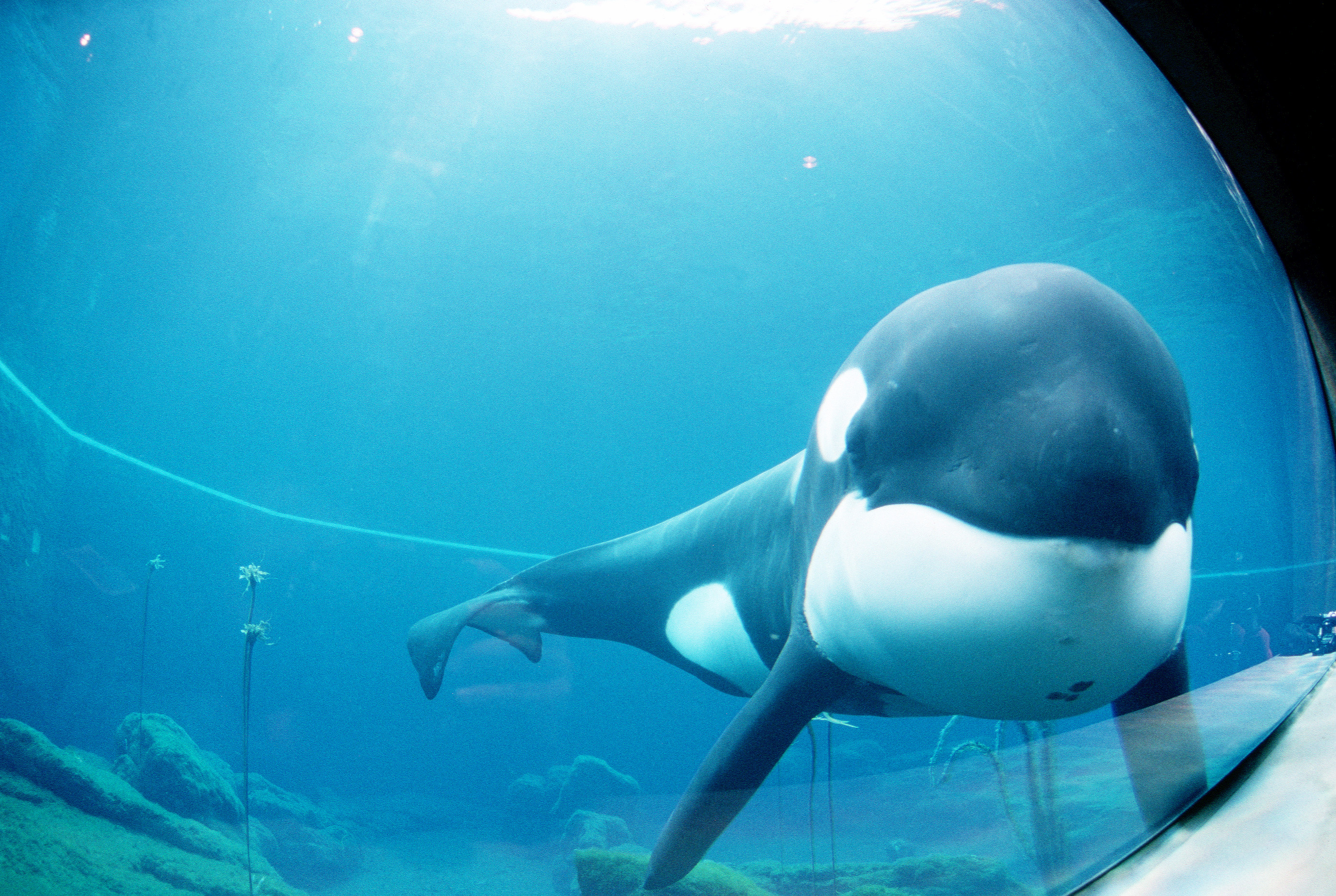
- Keiko at the Oregon Coast Aquarium in 1998
- Other names: Siggi; Kago
- Species: Orca (Orcinus orca)
- Sex: Male
- Born: c. 1976
- Died: 12 December 2003 (aged 27); Arasvikfjord, Norway
- Notable role: Willy in Free Willy
- Weight: 11500 lb (5,200 kg)
- www.keiko.com

Keiko (c. 1976 – 12 December 2003) was a male orca captured in the Atlantic Ocean near Iceland in 1979, and widely known for his portrayal of Willy in the 1993 film Free Willy. In 1996, Warner Bros. and the International Marine Mammal Project collaborated to return Keiko to the wild. After years of being prepared for reintegration, Keiko was flown to Iceland in 1998 and in 2002, became the first captive orca to be fully released back into the ocean. On 12 December 2003, he died of pneumonia in a bay in Norway at the age of 27.

== Life ==
Keiko was captured near Djúpivogur, Iceland in 1979 at the approximate age of two and sold to the Icelandic Aquarium in Hafnarfjörður. At the time, he was named Siggi, with the name Kago given at a later date.

In 1982, he was transferred to Marineland in Ontario, Canada. It was at this new facility he first started performing for the public. He developed skin lesions indicative of poor health, and was also bullied by an older orca. Keiko was then sold to Reino Aventura, an amusement park in Mexico City, Mexico, in 1985. Keiko lived in a warm, chlorinated tank with artificial salt water. These conditions were more suited for dolphins, and due to this, his health continued to decline.

At Reino Aventura, he was renamed "Keiko", a feminine Japanese name that means "lucky one". The owners of the park did not want to continue using the name "Kago" due to it being pronounced identically to a Mexican slang term for defecation. "Keiko" was chosen for its similarity to his former name. At the time of his arrival in Mexico, he was only 10 feet (3.0 m) long.

=== Free Willy ===
Keiko appeared in the film Free Willy in 1993. The publicity from his role led to an effort by Warner Brothers to find a better home for the orca. The pool for the now 21-foot-long (6.4 m) orca was only 22 feet (6.7 m) deep, 65 feet (20 m) wide and 114 feet (35 m) long. He was housed with bottlenose dolphins, but no others of his own species. Keiko was underweight for his size, and the water temperature was often too warm, which contributed to various skin problems. Due to a papillomavirus infection, Keiko experienced skin outbreaks, first observed while he was housed in Ontario, Canada, prior to his transfer to Mexico City, which complicated both his candidacy for relocation and for eventual release into the wild.

=== Free Willy-Keiko Foundation ===
The end credits of Free Willy included a phone number for whale preservation that received hundreds of thousands of call-ins, beginning the movement to return Keiko to the wild. Warner Brothers and Craig McCaw approached the International Marine Mammal Project for help. The IMMP established the Free Willy-Keiko Foundation in February 1995. With donations from the foundation and millions of school children, the Oregon Coast Aquarium in Newport, Oregon, was given over $7 million to construct facilities to return him to health with the hope of eventually returning him to the wild. Reino Aventura donated Keiko to the Foundation. Before he left the amusement park in Mexico City, Keiko performed for the public for the last time, and was seen off by thousands of children, with more onlookers watching his overnight journey to the Mexico City International Airport. At the time he weighed about 7,700 pounds (3493 kg). A Lockheed L-100 Hercules cargo plane donated by United Parcel Service (UPS) hauled Keiko to Newport, Oregon on 8 January 1996.

Upon his arrival at the Oregon Coast Aquarium, Keiko was housed in a new (2,000,000 US gallons (7,600,000 L)) concrete enclosure containing seawater. His weight had increased significantly by June 1997, to 9,620 pounds (4364 kg).

=== Re-introduction to the wild ===
The plan to return him to the wild was a topic of much controversy. Some felt his years of captivity made such a return impossible. Researchers in a scientific study later said attempts to return him to the wild were unsuccessful, but that monitoring him with radio and satellite tags was part of "a contingency plan for return to human care", which secured "the long-term well-being of the animal". Others considered his release misguided. The Norwegian pro-whaling politician Steinar Bastesen made international news for his statement that Keiko should instead be killed and the meat sent to Africa as foreign aid.

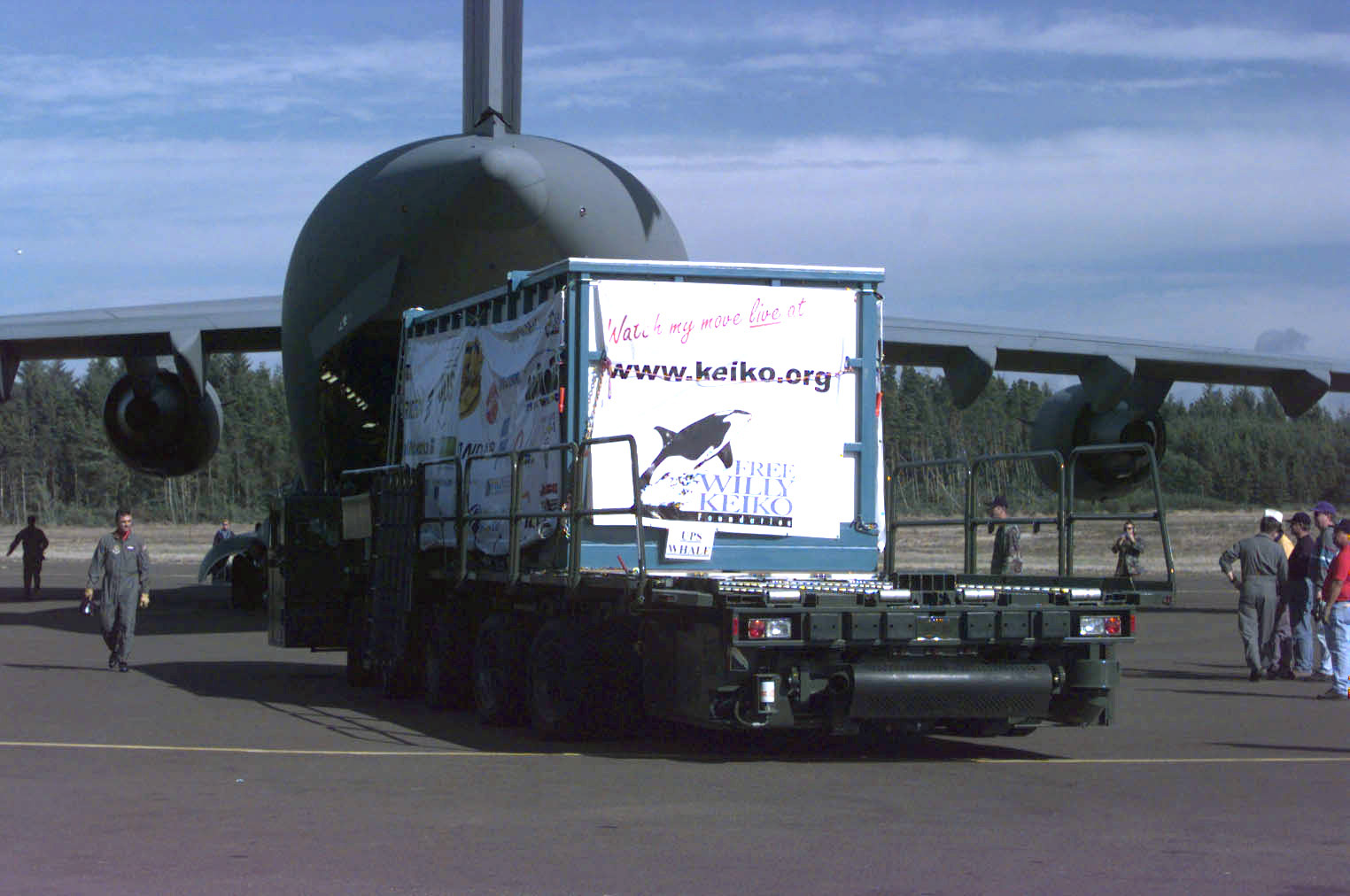
Loading Keiko onto a C-17 transport on 9 September 1998, in Newport, Oregon for transport to the Westman Islands in Iceland

Nevertheless, the process of preparing Keiko for the wild began on 9 September 1998, when he was flown to Klettsvík, a bay on the island of Heimaey in Vestmannaeyjar, Iceland. UPS again participated in transport, this time by providing ground transportation to the nearby Newport Municipal Airport. Keiko was transported in a specialized 30-foot-long (9.1 m) container filled with enough saltwater to cover him and cooled with ice cubes. He was then transported by air in a C-17 Globemaster airplane loaned by the U.S. Air Force. Upon landing at Vestmannaeyjar Airport, the C-17 Globemaster aircraft suffered a landing gear failure causing over $1 million in damage, though Keiko was unharmed.

His day-to-day care became the responsibility of the Free Willy-Keiko Foundation with management assistance from the Ocean Futures Society. He was initially housed in a pen in the Klettsvik Bay where he underwent training designed to prepare him for his eventual release, including supervised swims in the open ocean.

Ocean Futures left the Keiko project in late 2001. The Free Willy-Keiko Foundation and The Humane Society of the United States reestablished management of the project at that time until Keiko's death in 2003. Keiko was fully free on July 15, 2002 and departed Icelandic waters in early August, following some orcas but not integrated with the pod. His journey was tracked via the signal from a VHF tag attached to the dorsal fin. About a month later, he arrived in Norway's Skålvik Fjord, apparently seeking contact with human beings and allowing children to ride on his back. His caretakers relocated to Norway and continued to conduct boat-follows with Keiko for the next 15 months. On the basis of girth measurements and blood tests, it was concluded that Keiko had fed during his 900-mile (1500 km) journey from Iceland to Norway. Keiko occasionally approached groups of wild orcas, but remained on the periphery, at distances of 100–300 meters (109 to 328 yards), with his head pointing toward the closest orca.

== Death ==
Keiko resided in Taknes Bay, which was a clear inlet of coastal water where he was free to roam. There he was fed and looked after by keepers. Keiko had a tracking device attached to his dorsal fin that allowed his four handlers to pinpoint his location as long as he stayed within range.

Although Keiko was old for an orca in captivity, males who survive infancy live up to 50-60 years, but average 31 years in captivity. Executive director of the Free Willy-Keiko foundation stated that Keiko was relatively healthy, up until a quick onset of symptoms which consisted of lethargy and loss of appetite the day before. Dale Richards, one of his handlers, said Keiko died quickly after an irregular respiration rate was measured at age 27 on 12 December 2003. Pneumonia was determined as his cause of death.

A spokesman of the Humane Society of the United States, Nick Braden, said that veterinarians administered antibiotics to Keiko after he started showing symptoms that Thursday, however this was not enough to prevent his death.

== Evaluation of the reintroduction process ==
Most sources conclude that the project to free Keiko was a failure because the orca failed to adapt to life in the wild. In Norway, Keiko had little contact with other orcas and was not fishing; for months before his death, the orca was being fed daily.

A report in The Guardian describes the freed orca's life in Taknes Bay as follows:

... until his death Keiko was, rather than frolicking freely in his fjord, being taken for 'walks' by caretakers in a small boat at least three times a week. ... It took more than 60 failed attempts to reunite Keiko with free orcas before he followed a group where, spotting a fishing vessel off the Norwegian coast, he followed it into the fjords that would prove his final resting place.

According to an article in New Scientist, "He was seen diving among the wild orcas only once, on 30 July 2002. And after physical contact at the surface, Keiko swam away, seeking out human company on the tracking boat." Simon, Hanson, Murrey, et al. (2009) confirm that he was seen on the periphery of some wild groups but was never seen to be socially integrated with such whales. According to the BBC, he "never integrated into a wild pod [and] could not break his need for human contact".

According to Simon et al. (2009) Keiko's return to humans for food and for company confirms the failure of the project.

Reasons cited for Keiko's failure to adapt include his early age at capture, the long history of captivity, prolonged lack of contact with other orcas, and strong bonds with humans.

In spite of those comments, David Phillips, executive director of the Free Willy-Keiko Foundation, praised the release project: "We took the hardest candidate and took him from near death in Mexico to swimming with wild whales in Norway". "Keiko had five years with the sights and sounds of natural seawater. I think it was a great success in terms of Keiko, his well-being, and the whole world that wanted to do the right thing." Others also claim that the release was a success, and The Huffington Post called it a "phenomenal success ... giving him years of health and freedom".

The total cost of freeing Keiko was about US$20 million. The lead author of the study published by Marine Mammal Science said:

You can't just let these animals out into the wild. You have to take the responsibility, and that might cost a lot of money. The fortune spent on Keiko might have been better invested in conservation programs to protect whales and their habitat ... But that's not as appealing as the adventures of a single whale

An alternative to freeing orcas after long-term captivity, is the use of a "sanctuary" or "oceanic enclosure" (sea pen), according to Lori Marino of the Whale Sanctuary Project. "They can't be released, but their quality of life can be improved by orders of magnitude", Marino said in a 2016 interview where she agreed that the cost would be high ($15 to $20 million). "It's a solemn responsibility, and it's the best we can do for animals that are in captivity."

== Filmography ==
In 2010 the film Keiko: The Untold Story was released. In 2013 a New York Times video, The Whale Who Would Not Be Freed, included interviews about Keiko's return to the ocean. In 2024 the New York Times released a podcast focused on Keiko titled The Good Whale.

- Quinceañera (1987; TV series)
- Keiko en peligro (1990)
- Free Willy (1993)
- Azul (1996; TV series)
- Keiko: The Untold Story (2010)

== See also ==
- Springer (orca)
- List of individual cetaceans
