= Boomerang! (audio magazine) =

American audio magazine for children

Boomerang! is a monthly audio magazine for children. The magazine is based in San Francisco, California.

== History and profile ==
Boomerang! was founded by David Strohm in San Francisco in 1990. He continues to head-up the audio magazine's content development and day-to-day operations. The magazine targets children aged 6–12. It was an advertisement-free magazine during the 1990s. It was initially issued on tape.

== Awards ==
Boomerang! received the American Library Association's Notable Recording Award, the Parent's Choice Award and the Educational Press Association Award for excellence in news reporting and was included in Dr. Toy's 100 Best Children's Products.

== External resources ==
- Boomerang! Web site
- WorldCat record
