= Holiday in the Park =

Annual holiday event at Six Flags parks

Six Flags Holiday in the Park
- Genre: Christmas
- Date: November to January
- Frequency: Annual
- Location: Legacy Six Flags parks
- Years active: 1985–present

Holiday in the Park (known as Christmas in the Park at Six Flags México) is a Christmas event that takes place at several legacy Six Flags parks. The event features decorative Christmas lights along with live entertainment. It runs from November to January, following the Halloween event Fright Fest in October.

First introduced at Six Flags Over Texas in 1985, the event currently runs at six legacy Six Flags parks as of 2026. At its peak, it had run at 13 parks simultaneously before eight of the parks had removed their events in the 2020s.

== History ==
The 'Best Time of the Year' is one of the many holiday traditions that make up Six Flags Over Texas annual Holiday in the Park celebration.

Six Flags started Holiday in the Park at Six Flags Over Texas in 1985. The event ran from late November to early January. During this time the park was transformed into a gigantic holiday festival, with hundreds of thousands of Christmas lights as well as special holiday shows, rides, merchandise, foods, drinks, and a giant Christmas tree in the center of the park. The event was expanded to Six Flags Astroworld in 1988. Six Flags Over Georgia held the event in 1989 and 1990 but discontinued it after 1990.

Six Flags Fiesta Texas and Six Flags Discovery Kingdom opened this event in 2007, and Great Escape in 2009 to compensate the economic slowdown of the Great Recession of 2007 to 2009. Six Flags Astroworld's last season for this event was in 1997, and the event was cancelled in 1998. The Great Escape's event ran only for the 2009 season as Six Flags stated that the event was successful at the park, but also claimed a "business decision" was the reason behind the cancellation of the "Holiday in the Park" for the 2010 season.

Six Flags México and Six Flags Great Escape Lodge & Indoor Waterpark announced they will be celebrating a Christmas event similar to Holiday in the Park but as Christmas in the Park in Mexico and Holiday in the Lodge in New York, starting winter 2012.

In April 2014, Six Flags Magic Mountain and Six Flags Over Georgia both announced that they will host the Holiday in the Park Christmas event in late 2014 and for future years after.

Six Flags Great Adventure started having Holiday in the Park events in 2015. In 2016, then-named Six Flags St. Louis and Six Flags America started hosting the event. In 2017, Six Flags New England began hosting the event. Six Flags Great America and Frontier City debuted Holiday in the Park in 2018.

In 2022, Holiday in the Park was removed from the event lineup of several parks, including Six Flags Great America, Six Flags New England, Six Flags America, Six Flags St. Louis, and Frontier City.

On July 26, 2025, it was announced the event at Six Flags Great Adventure had been cancelled for that year, to focus on operations where weather conditions are consistent. Six Flags Over Georgia's Holiday in the Park event was additionally cancelled. These events are set to return for the 2026 season following an announcement on May 5, 2026, that the event would return at those parks.

Later in 2025, Six Flags Discovery Kingdom replaced their Holiday in the Park with Winterfest.

== Locations ==
=== Current locations ===
As of 2026, Holiday in the Park runs at six legacy Six Flags parks.

Location	First season	Months operated	Notes
Six Flags Over Texas	1985	November to January	
Six Flags Over Georgia	1989	November to January	Ran annually with the exception of 2025, returning in 2026.
Six Flags Fiesta Texas	2007	November to January	The park had a Christmas event before from 1994 to 1997 as Lone Star Christmas.
Six Flags México	2012	November to January	Operates as Christmas in the Park.
Six Flags Magic Mountain	2014	November to January	
Six Flags Great Adventure	2015	November to January	Ran annually with the exception of 2025, returning in 2026.

=== Former locations ===
As of 2026, 9 legacy Six Flags parks no longer run Holiday in the Park.

Location	First season	Last season	Months Operated	Ref
Six Flags AstroWorld	1988	1997	November to January	
Six Flags Great Escape and Hurricane Harbor	2009	2009	November to December	
Six Flags Great America	2018	2021	November to December	
Six Flags America	2016	2021	November to December	
Six Flags New England	2017	2021	November to December	
Frontier City	2018	2021	November to January	
Six Flags St. Louis	2016	2022	November to January	
Six Flags Discovery Kingdom	2007	2024	November to January	
Six Flags Great Escape Lodge	2012	2025	November to January	The park's resort/indoor waterpark hosts "Holiday in the Lodge." The theme park is closed during this time.

== Alternate versions ==
=== Winter Lights ===
Six Flags operated Winter Lights at Six Flags Great Adventure for the 2002-2003 and 2003–2004 seasons in November through January. It was a drive through (like the previous incarnation of Safari Off Road Adventure called Six Flags Wild Safari) with Christmas lights along the road and also with holiday rides, food, and shops.

=== Holiday in the Park Lights ===
In 2020, due to the COVID-19 pandemic and state limitations, Six Flags Great America, Six Flags New England and Six Flags Discovery Kingdom operated Holiday in the Park Lights. The event was specifically a light show only, with no rides operating. At Six Flags Great America, the park also ran shows during the event.

The event re-operated one last time at Six Flags Great America for the 2021 season with the re-operation of some rides, indoor theater venues, along with the Drive-Thru experience. The event ran from November through December. After this, the event was completely cut out for the 2022 season, with no word on if the event will ever happen again. At Six Flags New England, the lights-only event also ran for the last time from November through January.

=== Holiday in the Park Drive-Thru Experience ===
In 2020 during the COVID-19 pandemic, Six Flags Magic Mountain, Six Flags Great Adventure, Six Flags Great America, Six Flags Discovery Kingdom, Six Flags New England and Six Flags Fiesta Texas operated the Holiday in the Park Drive-Thru Experience, which was a drive-through route in each park that featured a light and sound show, with no rides operating. It operated only on weekdays at Great Adventure, Fiesta Texas, New England and Great America, with the normal Holiday in the Park or Holiday in the Park Lights event on the weekend, before it operated stand-alone in 2021.

The experience operated again at Six Flags Great America and Six Flags New England from November 2021 to January 2022.

== See also ==
- Six Flags Fright Fest
