= Reino Aventura =

Defunct Amusement park in Mexico City

- Previously known as El Nuevo Reino Aventura (1992–1994)
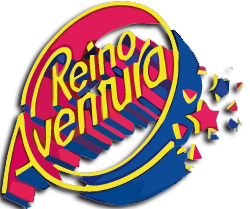
- Interactive map of Reino Aventura
- Location: Tlalpan, Mexico
- Coordinates: 19.295°N 99.209°W
- Status: Defunct
- Opened: 3 March 1982
- Closed: April 11, 2000
- Owner: Independent (1982–1998); Premier Parks (1999–2000)
- Operated by: Premier Parks (known as Six Flags since 2000)
- Slogan: Tienes que Vivirlo

Reino Aventura ("Adventure Kingdom" in Spanish) was an amusement park located in Tlalpan in the south-western part of Mexico City. It opened to the public in March 1982 as the biggest amusement park in Latin America.

As of April 14, 2000 to the present, the park is still operating under the name of Six Flags México.

== History ==
The park was closed to the public during part of 1992 while it underwent major reconstruction and improvements. Keiko, the orca that would later play the lead role in the motion picture Free Willy, was purchased from Marineland of Canada in Ontario, Canada, and was one of the new attractions aimed to improve the park. On July 3, 1992, the park was reopened to the public under the new name El Nuevo Reino Aventura ("The New Adventure Kingdom"). In 1995, the park changed management and the name was also changed back to the original Reino Aventura. Shortly thereafter, Keiko left the amusement park to be rehabilitated and eventually released into the wild. Thousands of people gathered at the amusement park to say goodbye to Keiko, who was airlifted by UPS to his new home at the Oregon Coast Aquarium in Newport, Oregon, United States on January 7, 1996, ending an era for the amusement park.

== Sale to Premier Parks (Six Flags) ==
In March 1999, Premier Parks, the holding company for all the Six Flags theme parks, announced the purchase of Reino Aventura for an estimated $59 million. The park then underwent a major reconstruction, which Cost approximately $40 million and was reopened to the public on April 14, 2000, as Six Flags México.

== See also ==
- Six Flags México
