= Boomerang Range =

Mountain range in Antarctica

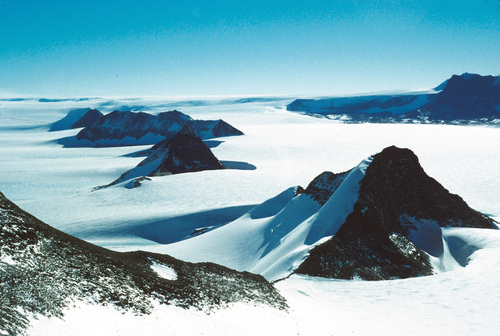
- Nunataks at north end of Boomerang range, looking NNE towards the polar plateau.

Highest point
- Elevation: ca. 1600m
- Coordinates: 78.45°S 158.75°E

Geography
- Location: Boomerang Range, west side of Skelton Neve, Antarctica

The Boomerang Range (at 78.45°S 158.75°E) is a narrow mountain range on the western side of the Skelton Glacier and Skelton Névé, Antarctica. The range is curved like a boomerang, and extends generally north–south for about 25 km.

It was mapped and named in 1957 by geologists in the New Zealand party of the Commonwealth Trans-Antarctic Expedition (CTAE), 1956–1958.

== See also ==
- Allemand Peak
