= Afterburn (roller coaster) =

Inverted roller coaster at Carowinds

- Previously known as Top Gun: The Jet Coaster (1999-2007)
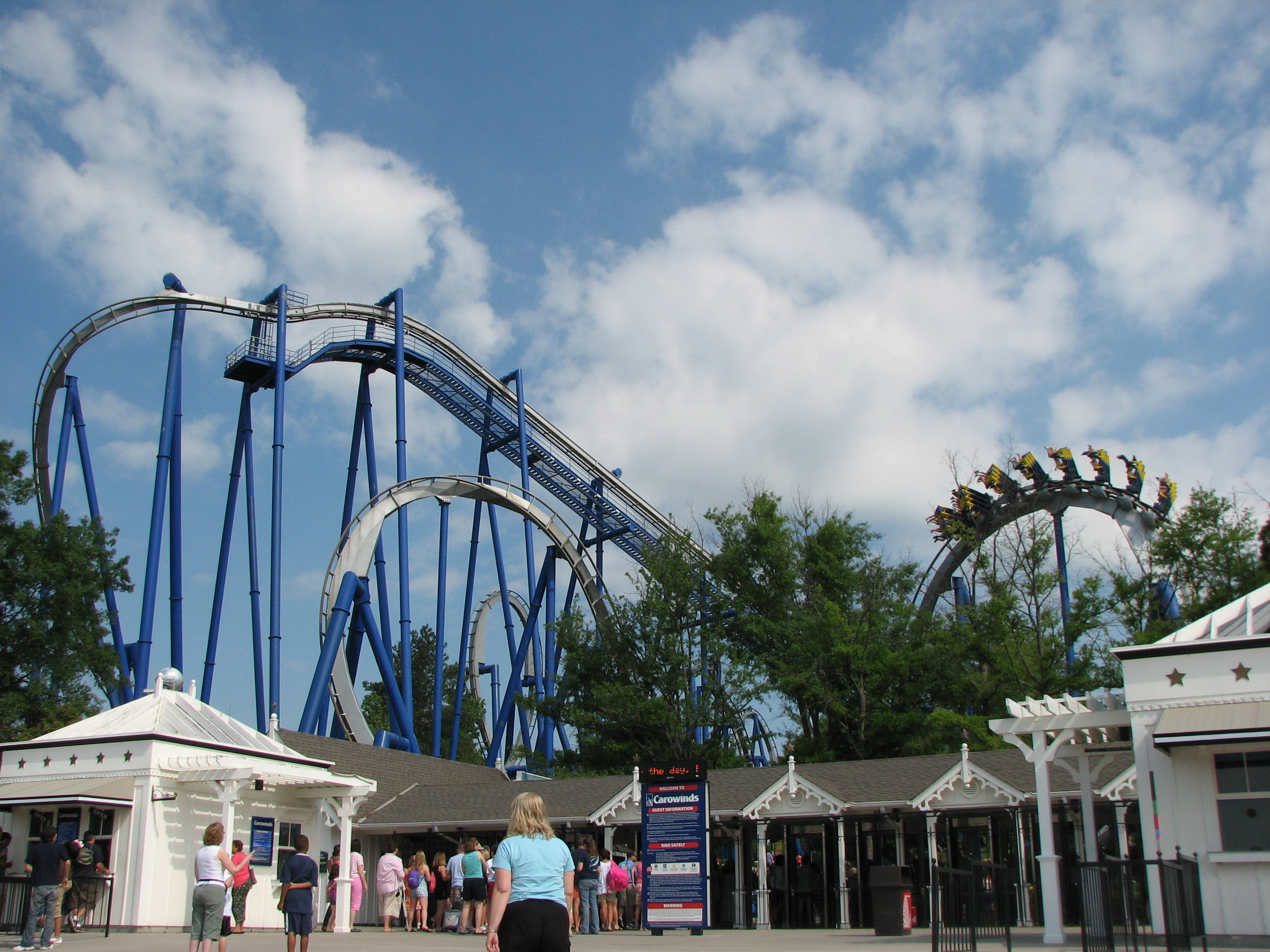
- An overview of Afterburn. Its lift hill, first drop and batwing can be seen in the foreground, with its vertical loop in the background.

Carowinds
- Location: Carowinds
- Park section: Crossroads
- Coordinates: 35°06′01″N 80°56′27″W
- Status: Operating
- Soft opening date: March 16, 1999
- Opening date: March 20, 1999
- Cost: US$10.5 million
- Replaced: Wild Bull

General statistics
- Type: Steel – Inverted
- Manufacturer: Bolliger & Mabillard
- Designer: Ing.-Büro Stengel GmbH
- Model: Inverted Coaster – Custom
- Lift/launch system: Chain lift hill
- Height: 113 ft (34 m)
- Length: 2,956 ft (901 m)
- Speed: 62 mph (100 km/h)
- Inversions: 6
- Duration: 2:47
- Capacity: 1380 riders per hour
- Height restriction: 54 in (137 cm)
- Trains: 2 trains with 8 cars; riders arranged 4 across in a single row for a total of 32 riders per train
- Fast Lane available
- Afterburn at RCDB

Afterburn is an inverted roller coaster located at Carowinds amusement park in Charlotte, North Carolina. After more than two years of planning and construction, the roller coaster opened on March 20, 1999. The ride previously operated as Top Gun: The Jet Coaster, before it was renamed following Cedar Fair's purchase of Paramount Parks in 2006.

Designed by Bolliger & Mabillard, Afterburn stands 113 feet (34 m) tall and reaches speeds of 62 miles per hour (100 km/h). It features a 2,956-foot-long (901 m) track and a nearly three-minute-long ride time. Afterburn has generally been well received, having been featured 11 times as a top 50 roller coaster in Amusement Today's Golden Ticket Awards.

== History ==
In early 1997, Carowinds began consultations with roller coaster manufacturer Bolliger & Mabillard about adding a new ride to their park. During 18 months of discussions, several designs and themes for the ride were developed, including theming it to the Godzilla franchise. In July 1998, the park announced the addition of Top Gun: The Jet Coaster for the 1999 season. At a cost of $10.5 million, it would be the single biggest investment in the park's history. The announcement followed Paramount Parks adding Top Gun-themed inverted and suspended roller coasters to several of their parks throughout the 1990s, including Paramount's Great America, Paramount Canada's Wonderland, and Paramount's Kings Island. To construct the attraction at Carowinds, the park's Bayern Kurve ride, Wild Bull, had to be removed. The park intended to keep the ride in storage for a potential relocation elsewhere within the park. The removal of Wild Bull shortened construction time because no trees or buildings had to be removed. Construction began in late July 1998, with the first track arriving in August. Testing was completed in January 1999.

Top Gun: The Jet Coaster soft opened to guests and media on March 16, 1999. Riders of the first cycle included NASCAR drivers Stanton Barrett, Tony Stewart, Jerry Nadeau, and Kenny Wallace. The ride officially opened to the public on March 20, 1999. On July 1, 2006, the Cedar Fair Entertainment Company announced their acquisition of all of the Paramount Parks, including Carowinds. The aforementioned Top Gun roller coasters at other parks were all renamed to Flight Deck by the 2008 season, with Carowinds' installation being renamed to Afterburn. For the 2014 season, the ride's 15th season, Afterburn received a new coat of paint.

== Characteristics ==
The 2,956-foot-long (901 m) Afterburn stands 113 feet (34 m) tall. The ride features a total of six inversions including a vertical loop, an Immelmann loop, a zero-g roll, a batwing, and a corkscrew. Riders over 54 inches (1.37 m) achieve a top speed of 62 miles per hour (100 km/h) on the two-minute forty-seven second ride. Afterburn operates with two trains featuring eight cars. Each car seats riders four across, for a total of 32 riders per train. The theoretical hourly capacity of the ride is 1,380 riders.

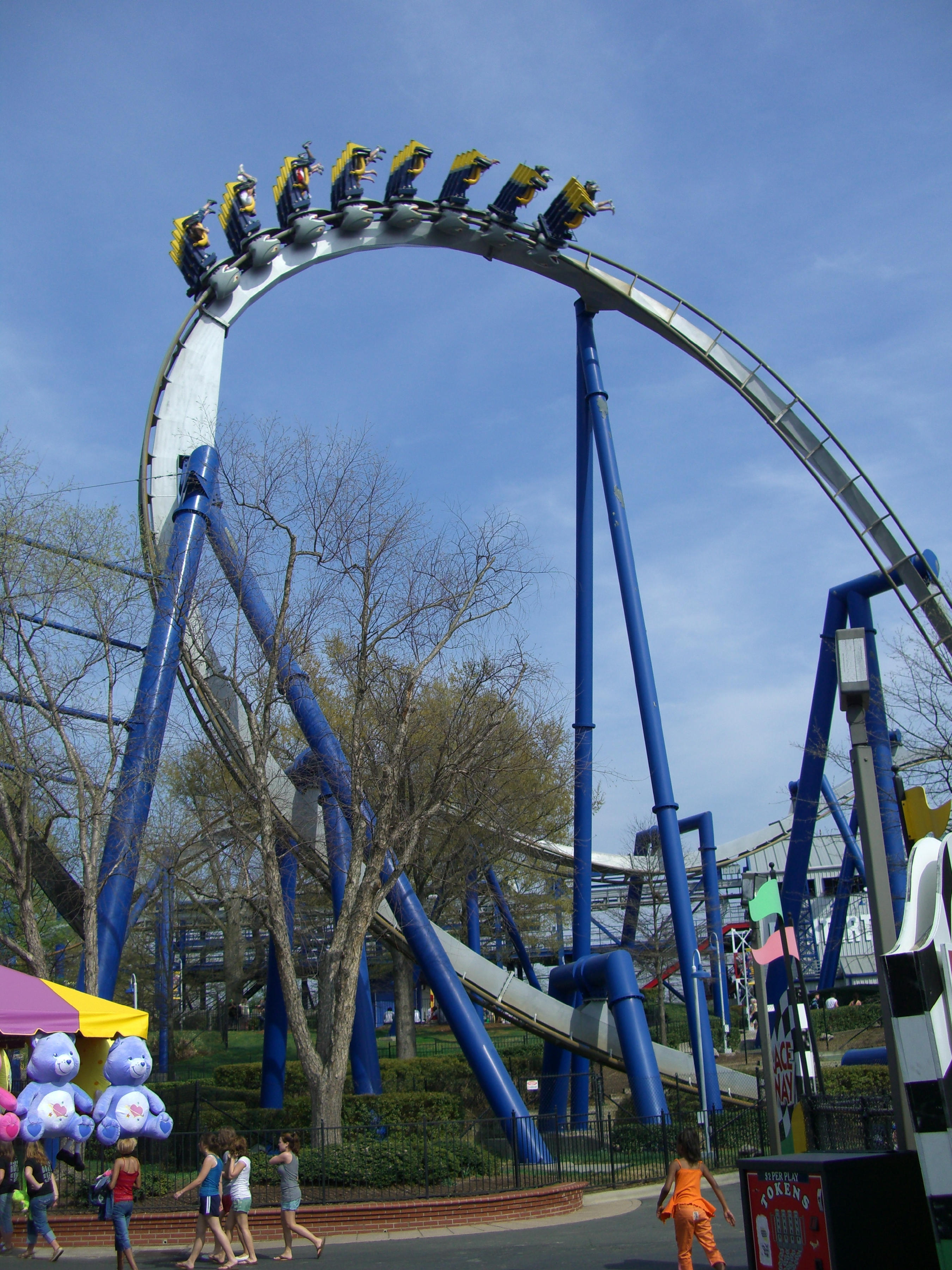
Afterburn's Immelmann

To match the original Top Gun theme, the ride's area was designed to feel like a military base. The main queue was housed in a hangar with a two-thirds scale F14 Tomcat fighter. Guests enter the ride area by passing through the batwing element.

== Ride experience ==
As the train leaves the station, a recorded message, "Clear for Takeoff," is played. Afterburn then climbs its chain lift hill, reaching a peak height of 113 feet (34 m). After a small pre-drop, the roller coaster train then drops to the right before entering its first inversion, a 90 foot (27 m) vertical loop. Riders then travel through a small ravine that dips below ground level and enter an Immelmann loop which sends the train in the opposite direction. The train then drops towards the ground, climbs back up, and spins through a zero-g roll, an inverting element where riders experience the feeling of weightlessness. Afterwards, the train dives back towards the ground and enters the double-inverting batwing element that crosses through a tunnel underneath the park's rear entrance.

After the train exits the batwing, it climbs through a camelback hill over the station before entering the final inversion, a corkscrew to the right. The train then begins a 200-degree turn while climbing to the left, after which it reaches the ride's brake run and returns to the station.

== Reception ==
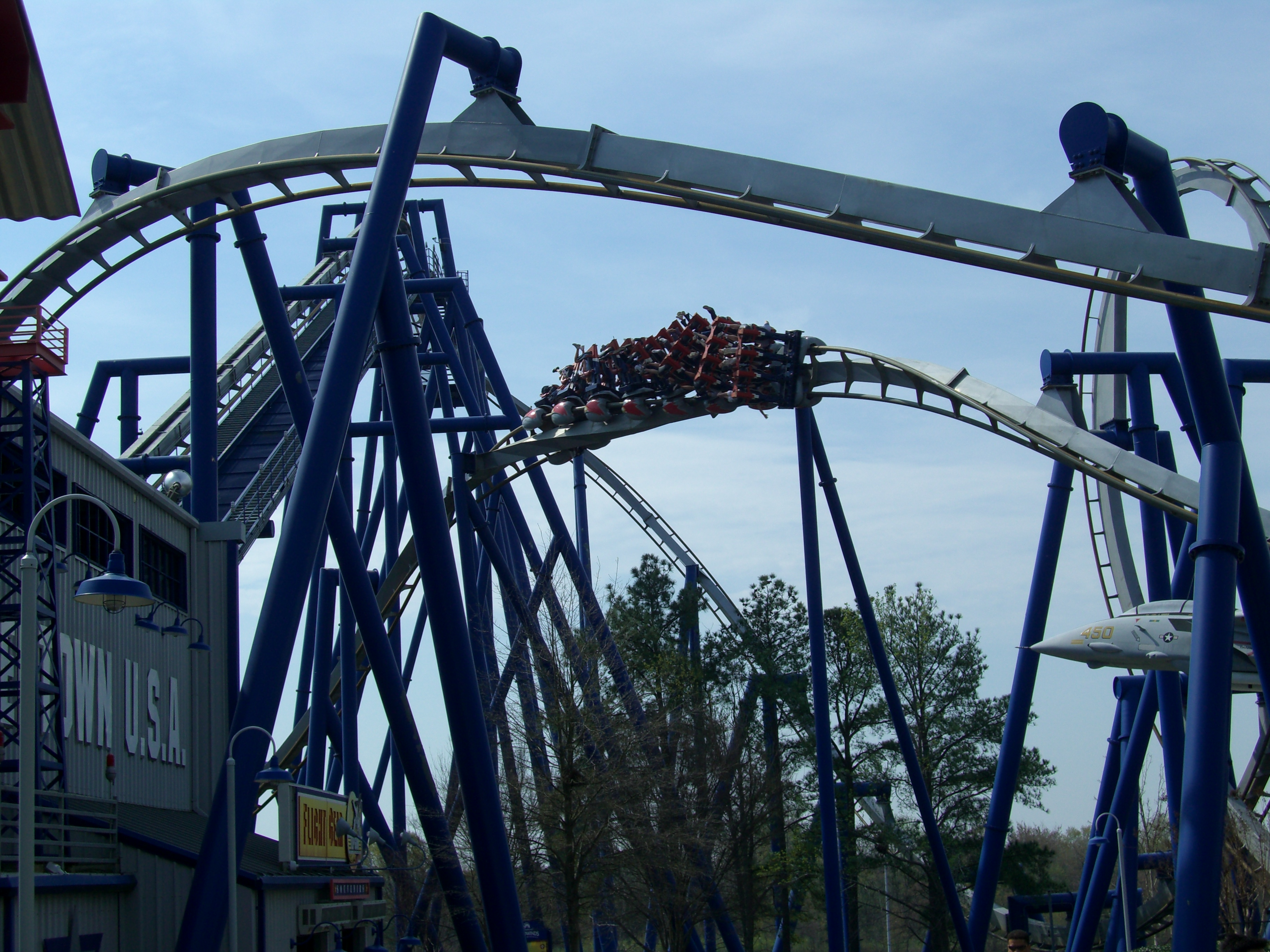
A train navigating Afterburn's zero-g roll

Afterburn has been well received. Arthur Levine of About.com stated the ride "is among the best inverted coasters" he's ridden, giving the ride a 4 out of 5 rating. Levine praises the ride for the lack of headbanging that results from over-the-shoulder-restraints (OTSR) on many roller coasters. The Coaster Critic describes the "pacing and order of inversions [as] near perfect", giving the ride an "excellent" rating of 9 out of 10.

Afterburn has appeared in Amusement Today's annual Golden Ticket Awards several times. It debuted at position 18 in 1999, before disappearing from the poll for 2000. The ride returned to the poll from 2001 to 2008 before failing to rank between 2009 and 2011. In 2012 and 2013, Afterburn again ranked in the Golden Ticket Awards' list of top 50 steel coasters; however, since 2014 it has failed to place on the top-50 ranking.

Golden Ticket Awards: Top steel Roller Coasters
Year									1998	1999
Ranking									–	18
Year	2000	2001	2002	2003	2004	2005	2006	2007	2008	2009
Ranking	–	34	46	39	40	29	32	41	39	–
Year	2010	2011	2012	2013	2014	2015	2016	2017	2018	2019
Ranking	–	–	45	35	–	–	–	–	–	–
Year	2020	2021	2022	2023	2024	2025				
Ranking	N/A	–	–	–	–	–				
