= Kuwait Entertainment City =

Former amusement park in Kuwait

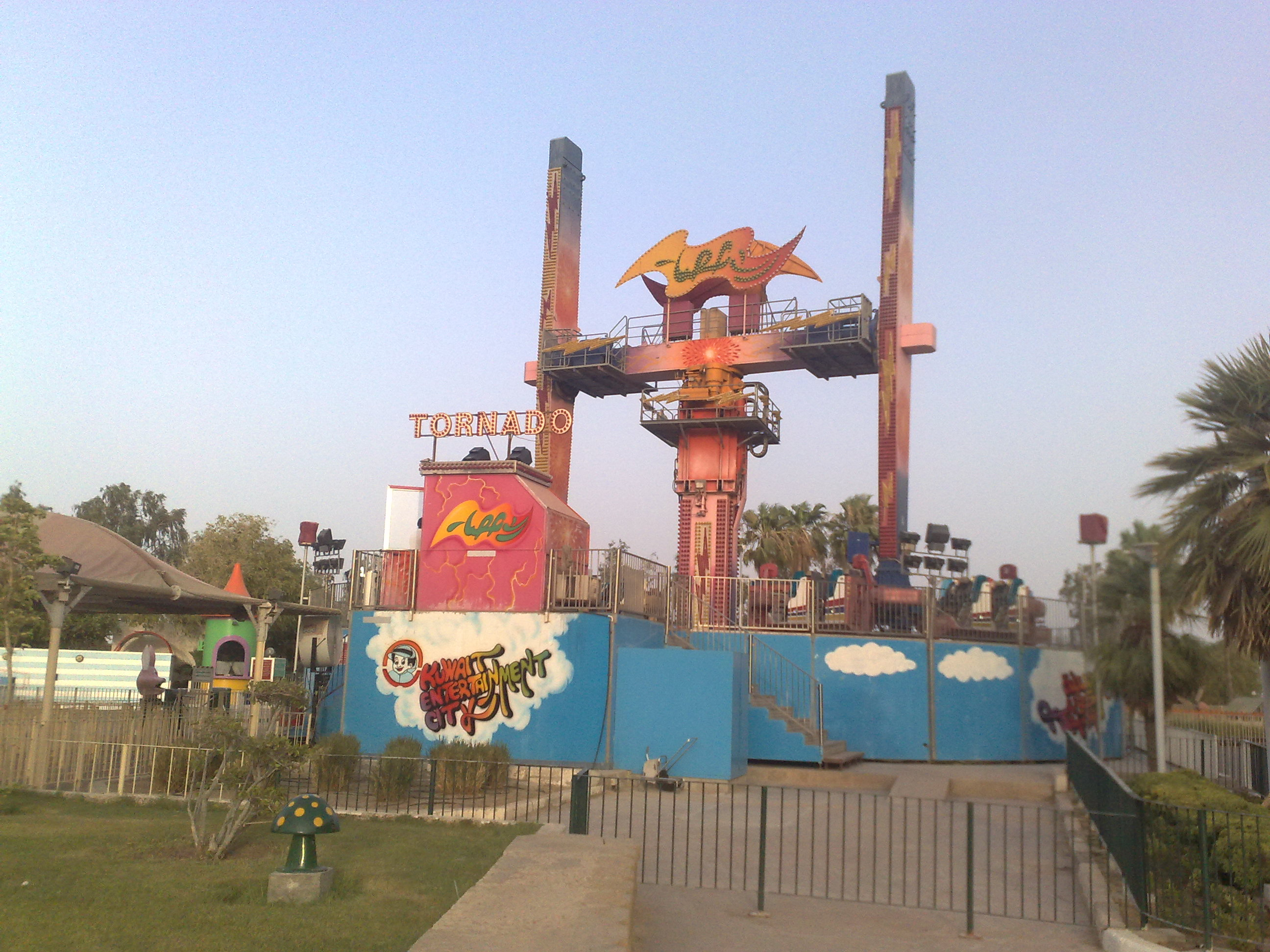
- The Tornado ride within the park
- Interactive map of Kuwait Entertainment City
- Location: Doha, Al Asimah, Kuwait
- Coordinates: 29.3480°N 47.8166°E
- Status: Defunct
- Opened: 14 March 1984
- Closed: 6 June 2016
- Operated by: Amiri Diwan of Kuwait
- Website: Official website

Kuwait Entertainment City (Arabic: مدينة الكويت الترفيهية) was an amusement park located in the western outskirts of Kuwait City, the capital of Kuwait. It first opened on 14 March 1984 and was run by the Kuwait-based Touristic Enterprises Company. Some of the park's attractions, such as its large Bolliger & Mabillard inverted roller coaster and its 3 ft (914 mm) narrow gauge railway, are common features in large-scale amusement parks in the United States, but were very rare in amusement parks in the Middle East. On 6 June 2016, the park closed with the aim of being renovated. In October 2019, it was announced that the Kuwait Entertainment City property will be taken over by Amiri Diwan and transformed into New Entertainment City Kuwait featuring 13 sections, including an indoor theme park envisioned by Ubisoft Entertainment and an indoor snowpark. By October 2020, the old park was fully demolished.

The Amiri Diwan has plans to replace it with the New Entertainment City, currently under construction. The New Entertainment City will include Outdoor Theme Parks, Indoor Theme Parks, Indoor Snow Parks, Water Parks, Aquarium, Dolphinarium, Museum and Planetarium, High Street Rail, a retail mall, Luxury District, Icon Hotel, and Sports and international festival areas. The New Entertainment City is expected to be one of the biggest entertainment venues in Kuwait when the project is complete.

== Roller coasters ==
Name	Manufacturer	Opened	Notes
Flying Dragon	Zierer	2007	Force - One model
Lightning	Bolliger & Mabillard	2004	Inverted model with five inversions; only B&M in the Middle East as of 2013
Oasis Express	Schwarzkopf	1984	Custom layout

== Activity ==
The amusement park had 12 entrances. Upon entering the park from the Arabian World Zone, Arabian customs were visible everywhere. In the center of the park was a miniature artificial lake, featuring a model of an ancient Kuwaiti fishing boat, as well as live fish. Around the lake were numerous kiosks selling various snacks, as well as merchandise, gold and silver jewelry, black robes, and veils. In the "Sinbad’s Voyage" area, there was a replica yacht based on the sailboat used by the ancient Arab navigator Sinbad. Visitors could board the yacht and follow a simulation of Sinbad's sailing route.

Visitors could also ride camels at the adjacent zoo, which housed elephants, antelope, sika deer, and various other animals which could be fed for a small fee.

The International World Zone featured themed areas from all over the world (similar to Epcot at Walt Disney World), including 19th-century Wild West-themed buildings, replicas of the Eiffel Tower and the Leaning Tower of Pisa, Dutch windmills, and the European Alps, as well as mosques from Baghdad and temples from Ancient Greece.

The Future World Zone contained various laser electronic ‘toys’, as well as futuristic transportation and communication equipment. There was a 110-meter-high rotating observation tower open to visitors. The zone also featured a "spaceship" and "Moon rocket," allowing visitors to be taken into the "space world" and sent to the "Moon".

=== Railway ===
The Arabian World Zone featured a narrow gauge railway with Arabian-style trains. Its stations were all domed buildings, with traditional Arabian patterns decorating the walls. The railway and its original train were manufactured by the US-based company Crown Metal Products in the 1980s, with a track gauge of 3 ft (914 mm). The railway continues to operate, but now uses a train built by the UK-based company Severn Lamb. The locomotive is one of their 4-4-0 Lincoln models custom-built to fit on 3 ft (914 mm) gauge track (the Lincoln model is normally built for 2 ft (610 mm) gauge track).

== History and future ==
Kuwait Entertainment City was open every year since its inaugural season, except for the period during and after Iraq's invasion and occupation of Kuwait beginning in 1990. From 1990 to 1991, Iraqi Forces took many of the park's rides and shipped them back to Iraq, while also pillaging and vandalizing the park's property. Many of the stolen rides, including the park's Crown Metal Products locomotive and train cars, ended up in Al Zawra’a Dream Park, located in Downtown Baghdad. After Iraqi forces were driven out of Kuwait and decisively defeated during Operation Desert Storm in 1991, the park began the process of recovery. It reopened to the public in 1994 until it closed for renovations on 6 June 2016.

While originally closed temporarily for renovations in 2016, the park was completely demolished in 2020, paving the way for a completely new park to be rebuilt on the same property, called "The New Entertainment City".

The Amiri Diwan's New Entertainment City is currently under construction in Kuwait.
