= Gyeongju World =

Theme park in South Korea

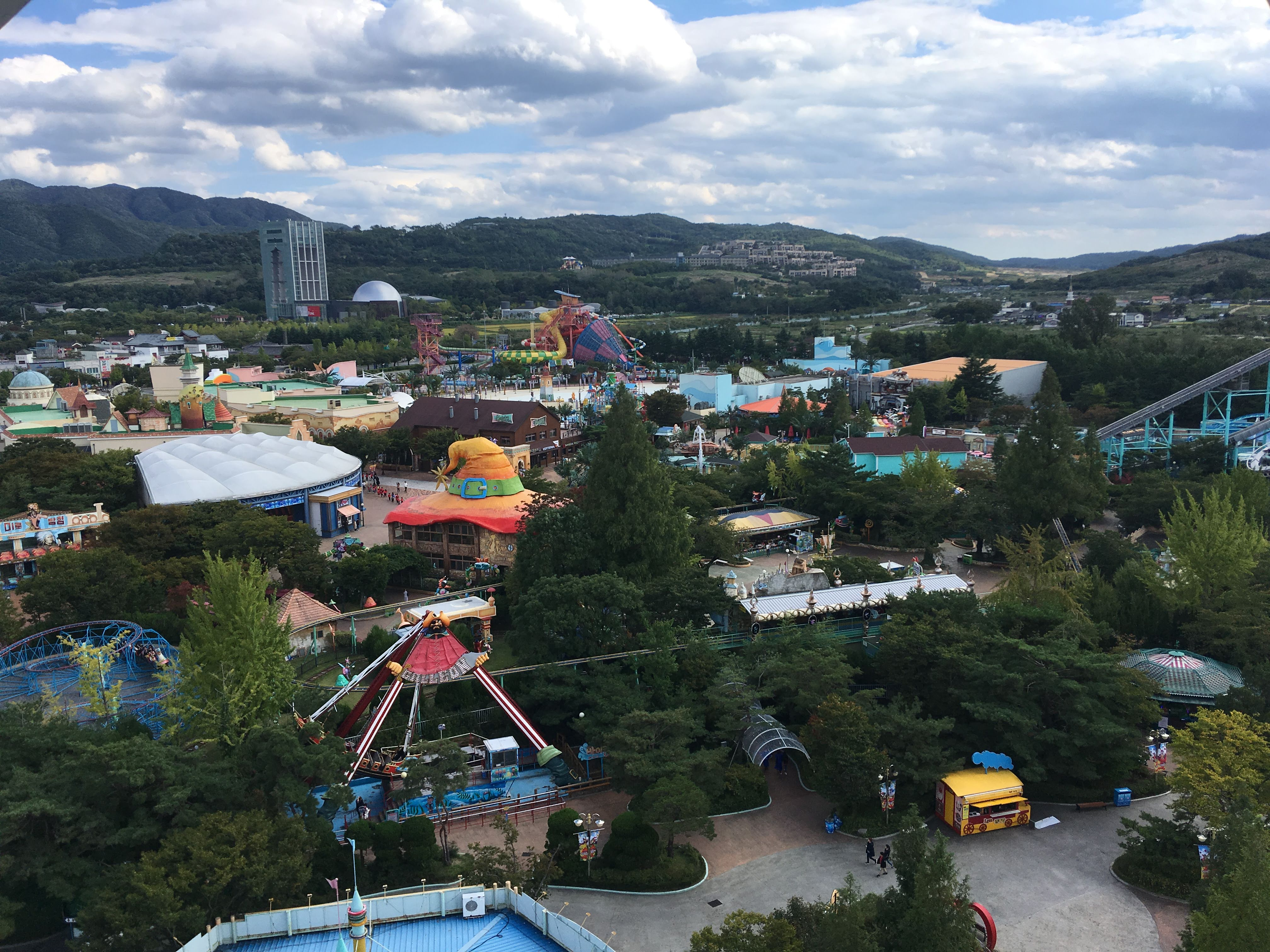
- Interactive map of Gyeongju World
- Location: Gyeongju, Gyeongsangbuk-do, South Korea
- Coordinates: 35.837°N 129.282°E
- Status: Operating
- Opened: May 1985

Gyeongju World (Korean: 경주월드) is a theme park in Gyeongju, Gyeongsangbuk-do, South Korea. Gyeongju World is composed of "X-Zone," "Snow Sled Garden," and "Wizard Garden." The X-Zone has rides such as the Phaethon, the Megadrop, the Tornado, and the Exploration of Grand Canyon. There are ski sleds, adult sleds, and children's sleighs in Snow Sled Garden. Wizard Garden is a children's area with a wide variety of children's rides.

== Roller coasters ==
Name	Type	Manufacturer	Model	Opened	Closed	Other statistics	Ref.
Space Tour	Steel			1985	2015	Duration: 1:26	
Space 2000	Steel	Meisho Amusement Machines		1991	2015	Inversions: 2; Duration: 1:39	
Dragon 2 Loop Coaster	Steel	Zamperla	Powered Coaster	1991	2023	Duration: 1:02	
Phaethon	Steel	Bolliger & Mabillard	Inverted Coaster	2007		Length: 3,280.8 ft (1,000.0 m); Height: 147.7 ft (45.0 m); Inversions: 6; Speed: 55.9 mph (90.0 km/h); Duration: 2:20	
Draken	Steel	Bolliger & Mabillard	Dive Coaster	2018		Height: 206.7 ft (63.0 m); Inversions: 2	
Valkyrie	Steel	Gerstlauer	Shuttle roller coaster	2021		Length: 201 m (659 ft); Height: 12 m (39 ft); Speed: 50 km/h (31 mph)	
Wizard Race	Steel	Zamperla	Powered Coaster	2024		Length: 155 m (509 ft); Speed: 29 km/h (18 mph)	
Sköll & Hati	Steel	Rocky Mountain Construction	Single-rail roller coaster	2024		Length: 595 m (1,952 ft); Height: 32 m (105 ft); Speed: 84 km/h (52 mph)	
