= Tanjora =

Inverted roller coaster at Wonderla Chennai

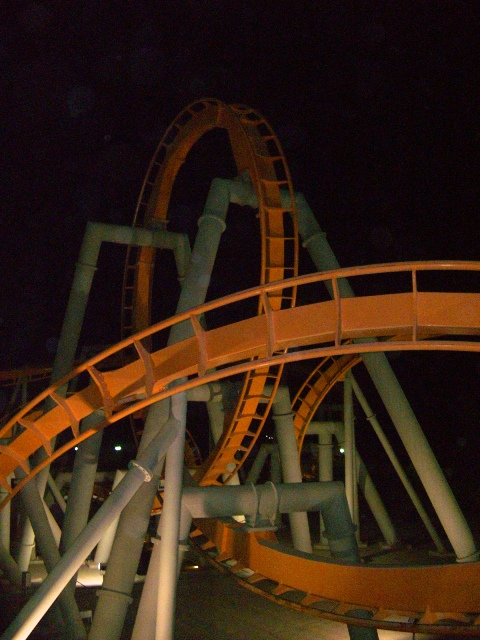
- The ride when it was Lightning at Kuwait Entertainment City

Wonderla Amusement Park Chennai
- Coordinates: 12.7422°N 80.1782°E
- Status: Operating
- Opening date: December 2, 2025

Kuwait Entertainment City
- Park section: International World
- Coordinates: 29.345588°N 47.818209°E
- Status: Removed
- Opening date: 2004
- Closing date: June 5, 2016
- Tanjora at Kuwait Entertainment City at RCDB

General statistics
- Type: Steel – Inverted
- Manufacturer: Bolliger & Mabillard
- Designer: Werner Stengel
- Model: Inverted Coaster
- Lift/launch system: Chain lift hill
- Height: 111 ft (34 m)
- Length: 2,562 ft (781 m)
- Speed: 53 mph (85 km/h)
- Inversions: 5
- Trains: 2 trains with 6 cars; riders arranged 4 across in a single row for a total of 24 riders per train
- Tanjora at RCDB

Tanjora is an inverted roller coaster located at Wonderla Amusement Park Chennai in Illalur, Tamil Nadu, India. The ride originally opened at Kuwait Entertainment City in Kuwait City as Lightning in 2004 with an orange-and-gray paint scheme and was built by Swiss manufacturers Bolliger & Mabillard. The coaster closed along with the park on 6 June 2016, and was subsequently removed in October 2020. It was relocated to Wonderla Amusement Park Chennai and reopened as Tanjora on 2 December 2025. After its relocation, it was repainted with bright orange track and light blue supports.

The ride's layout is identical to that of the Batman: The Ride model at many Six Flags parks in the United States.
