= Phaethon (roller coaster) =

Inverted roller coaster at Gyeongju World

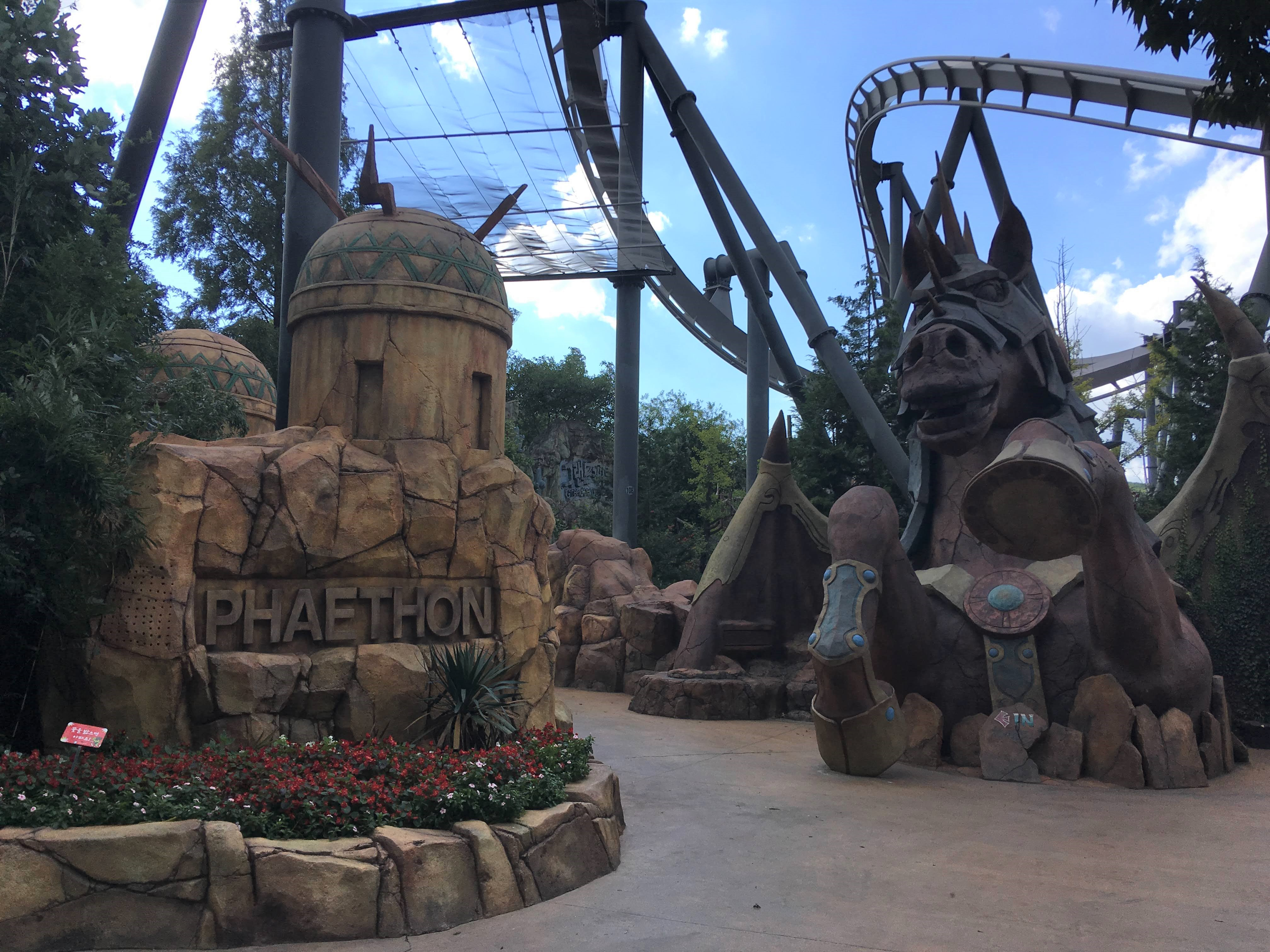

Gyeongju World
- Location: Gyeongju World
- Coordinates: 35.836657°N 129.280018°E
- Status: Operating
- Opening date: May 5, 2007

General statistics
- Type: Steel – Inverted
- Manufacturer: Bolliger & Mabillard
- Model: Inverted Coaster
- Lift/launch system: Chain Lift Hill
- Height: 147.67 ft (45.01 m)
- Length: 3,280.83 ft (1,000.00 m)
- Speed: 55.9 mph (90.0 km/h)
- Inversions: 6
- Duration: 2:20
- Max vertical angle: 90°
- Height restriction: 145–200 cm (4 ft 9 in – 6 ft 7 in)
- Phaethon at RCDB

Phaethon (Korean: 파에톤) is an inverted roller coaster at Gyeongju World in South Korea. Designed by Bolliger & Mabillard, the ride opened to the public on May 5, 2007. Leading up to its development, the park was seeking to commemorate Children's Day and to renovate Gyeongju World to boost tourism. It is South Korea's first inverted coaster, as well as the fifth fastest, third tallest, and third longest in the country.

== History ==
In 2006, Gyeongju World initially announced that an inverted coaster would open around June the next year as part of a plan to expand Gyeongju World after reaching its 20th anniversary. The expansion was calculated to increase the number of visitors to Gyeongju World to around 1.3 million people per year. 15 billion South Korean won were invested in constructing this coaster. Phaethon opened in May 5, 2007 at Gyeongju World. It was created to commemorate Children's Day in South Korea. Prior to T Express's opening, it was the tallest, fastest and longest roller coaster in South Korea.

== Characteristics ==
The coaster starts with a 90 degree turn to the left leading to the initial lift hill After coming across the pre-drop, the coaster goes through a drop which spirals 90 degrees to the left, followed by a vertical loop. The next inversion is a zero-g-roll, followed by a cobra roll over the pathway leading to the entrance. After the cobra roll, the riders go through a 360 degree helix over the entrance to the coaster. After the helix comes the first corkscrew followed by another corkscrew, and a 540 degree helix all leading up to the final brakes. Phaethon's layout is similar to that of Raptor, a roller coaster in Ohio, United States.

Phaethon has 2 cars and 8 cars per train, with riders arranged 4 across per row, thus seating 32 people per train. It is 3280.8ft long and 147.7ft tall, and it has a speed of 55.9mph. Phaethon has six inversions and runs for 2 minutes and 20 seconds. Phaethon is the fifth fastest and third tallest and third longest rollercoaster in South Korea. It also has the most number of inversions in a South Korean rollercoaster, and is the first inverted rollercoaster in South Korea. Phaethon also has the third most inversions on a rollercoaster in Asia.

== Incidents ==
On June 16, 2023, Phaethon stopped operating temporarily due to a power outage at Gyeongju World.
