= Tornado (Parque de Atracciones de Madrid) =

Madrid Amusement park attraction

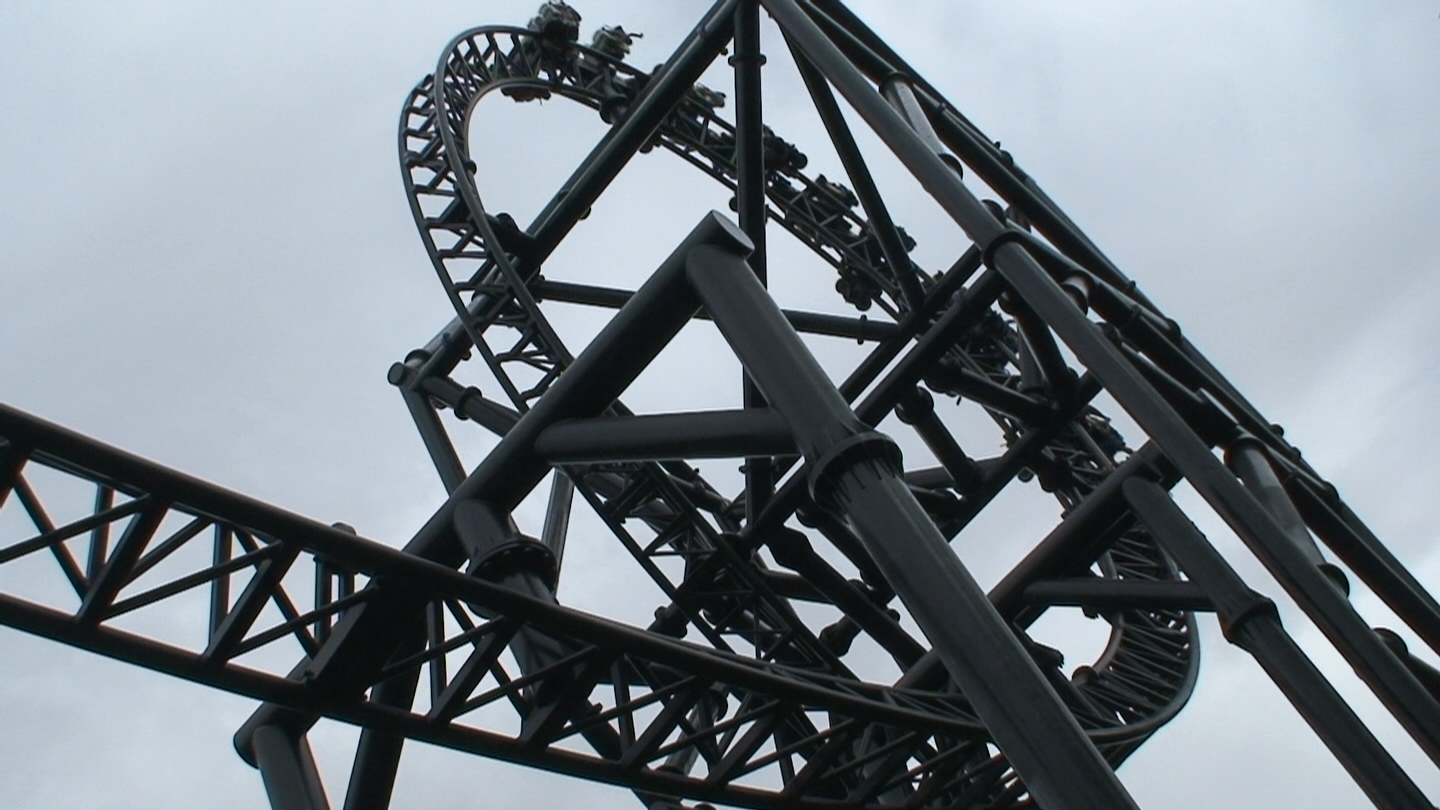

Parque de Atracciones de Madrid
- Location: Parque de Atracciones de Madrid
- Coordinates: 40.4134°N 3.7480°W
- Status: Operating
- Opening date: May 23, 1999

General statistics
- Type: Steel – Inverted
- Manufacturer: Intamin
- Designer: Ingenieur Büro Stengel GmbH
- Height: 98 ft (30 m)
- Length: 2,624.7 ft (800.0 m)
- Speed: 49.7 mph (80.0 km/h)
- Inversions: 3
- Duration: 2:00
- G-force: 4
- Height restriction: 120 cm (3 ft 11 in)
- Tornado at RCDB

The Tornado is an inverted roller coaster at the Parque de Atracciones de Madrid in Casa de Campo, Madrid, Spain. Manufactured by Intamin, it opened on May 23, 1999.

== Description ==
Tornado is an inverted roller coaster with a length of 2,624.7 feet (800.0 meters) and a height of 98 feet. It is unusual among inverted roller coasters made by Intamin in using a chain lift rather than a magnetic launcher. It features 3 inversions, 2 loops, a corkscrew, and a 30m drop to 80 km/h.

The ride was designed by Ingenieur Büro Stengel GmbH and opened on May 23, 1999. It is one of five rides at the park that form the subject of physics problems in a student workbook that won the Madrid award for teaching materials.

== Ride experience ==
When Tornado starts, the coaster exits the station and goes up a lift hill. Riders then drop 30 metres (98 ft) and reach a speed of 80 kilometres per hour (50 mph) before entering the first loop, followed by the second. The coaster then goes through a corkscrew, which is one of the inversions. It then goes into 2 or 3 helices before going through the brake run, which takes riders back into the station, where the ride ends. The ride lasts 2 minutes.

== Controversies ==
In June 2009 the ride was temporarily closed because it was so popular with teenagers that there was risk of an accident. In 2011, a complaint that noise from the park exceeded legal limits singled out the Tornado as even noisier than two newer roller coasters in the same park, the Tarántula and the Abismo.
