= Eurostar (roller coaster) =

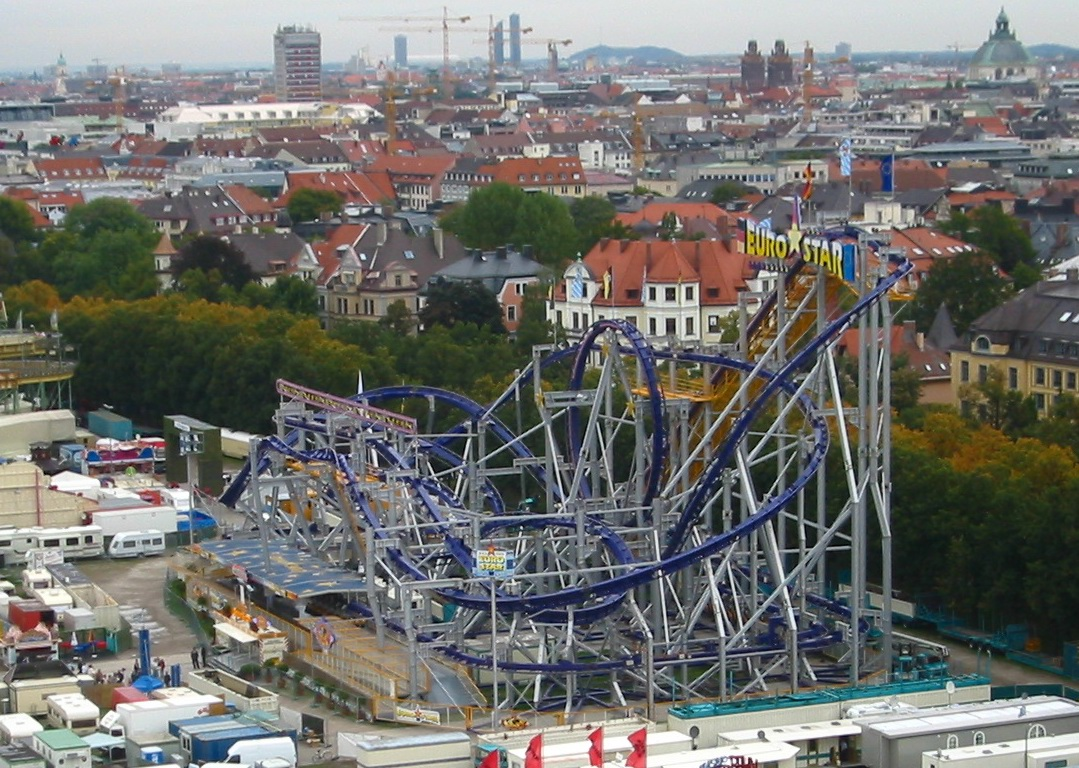
- Euro-Star at the Oktoberfest - from the Ferris wheel

Anapa Jungle Park
- Coordinates: 44.904132°N 37.322291°E
- Status: Operating
- Opening date: August 8, 2019
- Cost: $20,000,000

Gorky Park
- Coordinates: 55.731963°N 37.599037°E
- Opening date: 2008
- Closing date: 2011

Oktoberfest
- Coordinates: 48.131°N 11.549°E
- Status: Removed
- Opening date: July 20, 1995
- Closing date: 2011

General statistics
- Type: Steel – Inverted
- Manufacturer: Intamin
- Designer: Werner Stengel
- Model: Portable Inverted Coaster
- Lift/launch system: Chain lift hill
- Height: 98.91 ft (30.15 m)
- Drop: 90.56 ft (27.60 m)
- Length: 2,769.02 ft (844.00 m)
- Speed: 50.2 mph (80.8 km/h)
- Inversions: 4
- Duration: 2:20
- Max vertical angle: 45°
- Capacity: 1200 riders per hour
- G-force: 5.2
- Height restriction: 54 in (137 cm)
- Trains: 3 trains with 7 cars. Riders are arranged 4 across in a single row for a total of 28 riders per train.
- Subcontractor: Giovanola
- Eurostar at RCDB

Eurostar is the world's largest portable inverted roller coaster. Eurostar was designed by Oscar Bruch, who had created and/or operated many portable coasters including Alpina Bahn, Looping Star and Thriller. The inverted coaster was becoming increasingly popular in the mid-1990s, having been introduced to the theme park market by Bolliger & Mabillard. However, B&M were reluctant to attempt a travelling model and so Eurostar was designed by Werner Stengel from a rough layout designed by Bruch. Aspects of the ride were built by many companies from across Europe (hence the name), under the directorship of the Swiss ride firm Intamin.

== Ride experience ==
After leaving the station, the 28 passenger train makes a wide “U” turn to the lift at the back of the ride. Rides ascend the 98.91 foot chain lift hill. Once at the top of the lift, riders drop towards the right reaching speeds of 50.20 MPH at the bottom of the drop. Upon exiting the drop, the train navigates a large vertical loop that runs parallel to the lift. After the lift, riders experience a 121° overbanked left turn that leads into a zero-g roll. After the zero-g roll, riders make another left turn up into the first block brake. After exiting the block brake, riders make another left hand turn and navigate through two back-to-back corkscrews then make a right turn up into the second block brake. After the second block brake, riders experience a tight right hand downward helix and a small hill before hitting the final brake run and returning to the station.

== History ==
The creation of Eurostar was supervised under the Bruch Engineering Office. Unlike normal coasters, the task of creating Eurostar was handed to many different subcontracted companies that specialized in roller coasters. Bruch Engineering Office coordinated each company’s interaction with the others. Bruch created a rough layout of what he wanted in the ride and went to Werner Stengel to design and engineer the ride from his idea. A detailed model was created and fabrication of Eurostar could begin.

Eurostar's control system was subcontracted to Intamin, who designed and produced the system. Giovanola was subcontracted to produce the track, lift and most of the electrical system. Mannhardt, a company located in Southern Germany, produced the supports, as well as the sole and chocks for the coaster. The company declared bankruptcy during construction. Bruch founded a “hive-off vehicle” to complete the construction phase and assure Eurostar's completion.

Giovanola assembled the trains with components produced by an unknown Dutch company. MACK Rides created the “cash box” area. Johann Gerstlauer, whose brother Hurbert Gerstlauer owns Gerstlauer Elektro GmbH, produced the station and exit area. Pelz, another company located in Southern Germany, produced the ride's lighting.

On July 20, 1995, Eurostar debuted at a fair in Düsseldorf after a six-day delay. From 1995 to 2008, it traveled on the fairground circuit in Germany. In early 2008, Eurostar opened in Hamburg in early 2008, but this to date has been its last appearance in Germany. Parts of the ride arrived in Düsseldorf in July 2008, but at this point the final payment came from Gorky Park in Moscow, Russia. They wanted the ride immediately. The ride opened at Gorky Park late in 2008 and closed in 2011 after operating for three years. The reasons for dismantling provided by Moscow authorities were safety concerns and redesigning of the Gorky Park. In August 2019, it was announced that Eurostar would be relocated to Detskiy Park in Anapa, Russia.

== Moving from fair to fair ==
The transporting of Eurostar has been accomplished by Siegfried Scholten and his team more than 60 times since the coaster debuted in 1995. Disassembling, transporting and reassembling Eurostar requires a minimum of eight days (a rare exception). It requires four cranes and 20 workers working around the clock in order to meet the assembly deadline on time at the next fair.

=== Disassembly ===
Disassembly of Eurostar usually takes about 10 days. When each piece is removed it is placed on a specific trailer created for that piece or pieces.

=== Transport ===
85 semi-trailer trucks and containers are required for transporting Eurostar. The trailers that house the ride during transport are customized with special mountings for each part.

=== Assembly ===
Assembly of Eurostar takes about 14 days to complete. Since Eurostar does not have a second sole, the whole ride must arrive on site at the next fair before assembly can begin.

The sole is the most complex part of assembling the coaster. All support points must be on the same level and the ride must be properly aligned to ensure the coaster stands straight so that the static and dynamic forces are led to the ground safely. To ensure this, sophisticated laser leveling instruments are used. Depending on the level of the ground, different sized wooden beams and planks are used to level out sections of the sole, just like for other portable rides.

Further assembly of Eurostar is purely routine. As the same with permanent coasters, each support is installed and the next track segment connected to it and fixed into position with large bolts.

The trains are transported on station track segments that hold elements of the station. These pieces are installed with the trains on track. The lift is installed similarly to the trains and station pieces. Segments of chain are left in each piece of the lift and are joined later after assembly.

== Refurbishments ==
In time, the frequent assembly and disassembly of Eurostar caused the ride to become rough and unpleasant. The small footprint of the ride and tight layout amplified these discomforts. In 1995, the ride’s first year, a brief refurbishment consisted of stiffening track pieces with doweled joints between the spine of the track and the rails.

In 2003, Eurostar was assembled for another refurbishment at Gerstlauer Elektro GmbH after Oktoberfest 2003 where the ride received an upgrade to its electrical system. Measurements were also taken to relate forces to track positions in order to rework rough areas to be smoother. The optimal track layout was created after intensive calculations and new track tubes where bent and installed using the existing spines.

In 2004, before being assembled for the Düsseldorf fair, Eurostar's zero-g roll, the left turn up into the first block brake after the zero-g roll and the left hand turn after the first block brake, were replaced. The doweled joints in the vertical loop had holes drilled into them to reduce noise and oscillation. Modification of the track connections was also done. The lift had a cover installed that would slide over the saw-tooth profile of the anti-rollbacks, making the surface smooth and eliminating noise created as the anti-rollbacks jumped between teeth. The change in the safety system required a control system to ensure rides safety. The train's speed is controlled and any variance in the speed causes the cover to be pulled aside to expose the saw-tooth, causing the anti-rollbacks to engage. Should the system fail, springs would push the cover aside to ensure the anti-rollbacks would engage in case an emergency would arise.

Eurostar received another upgrade in 2005 to the ride technology. The refurbishment cost one million Euros.
