= Inverted roller coaster =

Type of roller coaster

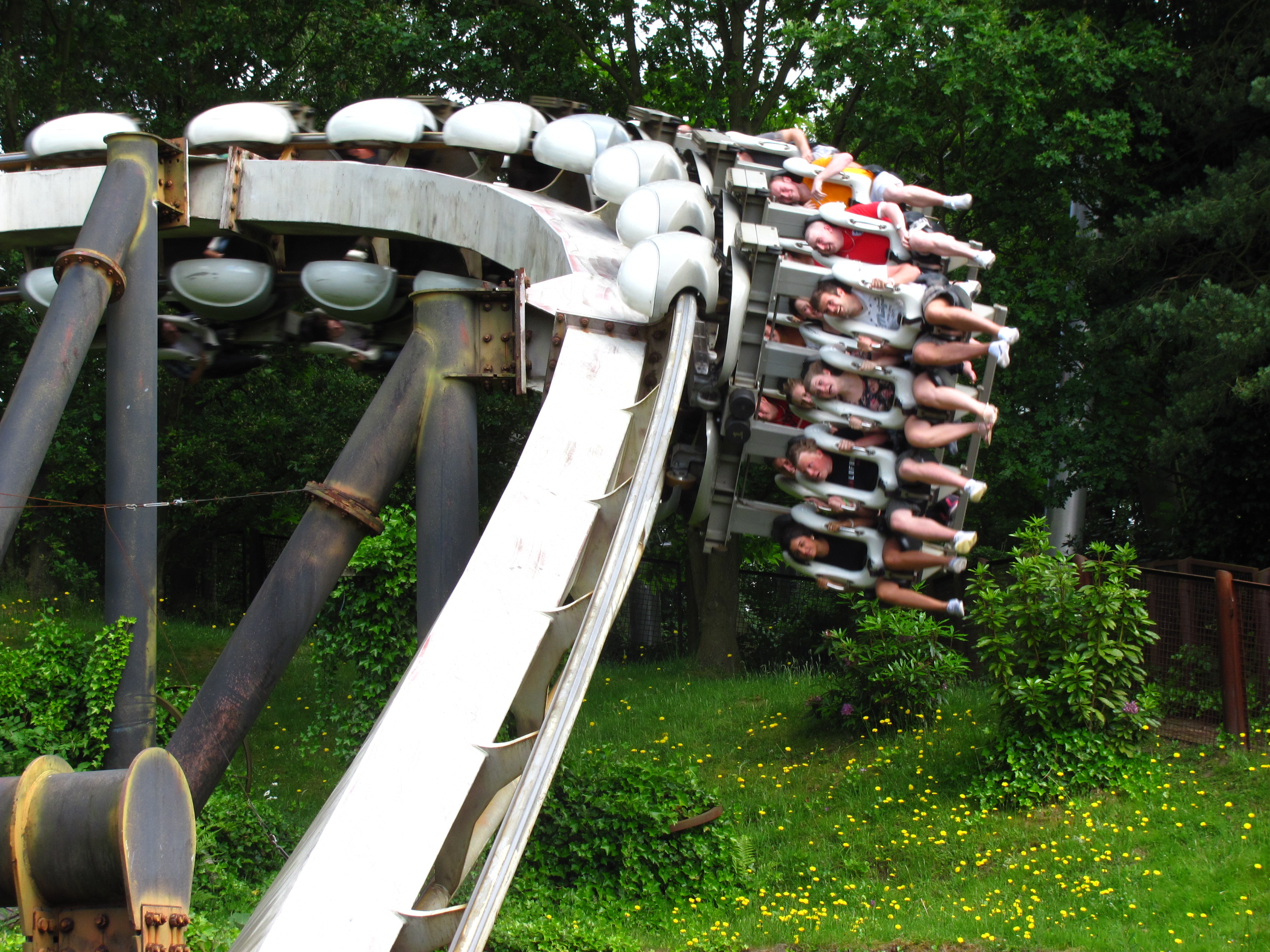
- Nemesis at Alton Towers in 2010
- Status: In production
- First manufactured: 1992
- No. of installations: 189
- Manufacturers: Bolliger & Mabillard, Vekoma, Intamin, Gerstlauer, and Mack Rides
- Vehicles: Suspended trains
- Restraint Style: Over-the-shoulder (most common style)

An inverted roller coaster is a type of steel roller coaster in which the train runs under the track with the seats directly attached to the wheel carriage. Riders are seated in open cars, letting their feet swing freely. The inverted coaster was pioneered by Swiss roller coaster manufacturer Bolliger & Mabillard in the early 1990s with the development of Batman: The Ride, which opened at Six Flags Great America on May 9, 1992.

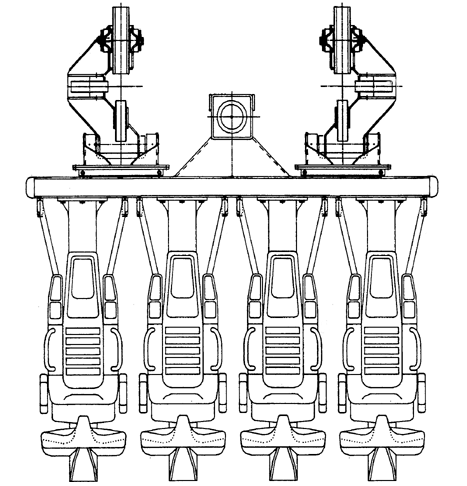
B&M style inverted roller coaster car.

Versions of inverted coasters have since been produced by other major coaster manufacturers such as Vekoma and Intamin. Intamin has few designs classified as inverted coasters, although they do install inverted coaster trains on some of their launched designs. Vekoma, however, predominantly mass-produced the same design (Suspended Looping Coaster) with 41 identical coasters installed around the world, though Vekoma now markets a newer style of inverted coaster, the Suspended Thrill Coaster, which utilises lap-bar restraints instead of the traditional over-the-shoulder restraints. Vekoma was also the first manufacturer to install a family-friendly inverted roller coaster with the opening of Flying Ace Aerial Chase at Kings Island in 2001. Giovanola also has a single inverted coaster operating, which uses the box-track design, also used by Bolliger & Mabillard.

The inverted coaster differs from the older suspended coaster, which runs under the track, but features cars that enclose the rider's legs and lower body and are attached to the track above by a pivoting bar, whereas the trains on inverted coasters are directly attached to the track. This direct attachment facilitates inversions, which aren't possible on suspended coasters. Inversions typically featured on inverted coasters include vertical loops, zero-g rolls, Immelmann loops, cobra rolls, and corkscrews, though Vekoma's suspended loopers typically feature sidewinder and in-line twist elements.

== History ==
The inverted coaster was developed in the early 1990s by engineers Walter Bolliger and Claude Mabillard of the Swiss roller coaster manufacturer Bolliger & Mabillard in cooperation with engineer Robert Mampe and Jim Wintrode, at the time the general manager of Six Flags Great America, who first envisioned a suspended coaster capable of inversions. The result of this partnership, Batman: The Ride, soft opened at Six Flags Great America as the first inverted coaster in the world on May 2, 1992, officially opening on May 9, 1992. With the coaster's success, Time Warner, Six Flags' parent company at the time, moved to construct a series of duplicates of the ride at various Six Flags parks. In 1993, a second installation of Batman: The Ride at Six Flags Great Adventure opened as the second inverted coaster in the world. Six Flags has since gone on to construct five additional duplicates of the ride.

The second unique inverted coaster was Flight Deck which opened in 1993 at California's Great America as Top Gun. Nemesis, now Nemesis Reborn, was the first inverted coaster constructed outside the United States when it opened at Alton Towers in Staffordshire, England in 1994. That same year, Raptor opened at Cedar Point. With a 3,790-foot (1,160 m) track layout, Raptor was far larger and featured a less compact layout than its predecessors. It also featured the first cobra roll on an inverted coaster.

== Installations ==
231 inverted roller coasters have been installed at various theme parks, some of which have been relocated. The following list is not exhaustive and only shows the most notable installations.

Name	Park	Opened	Manufacturer	Status
Batman: The Ride	Six Flags Great America	1992	Bolliger & Mabillard	Operating
Batman: The Ride	Six Flags Great Adventure	1993	Bolliger & Mabillard	Operating
Flight Deck	California's Great America	1993	Bolliger & Mabillard	Operating
Nemesis Reborn	Alton Towers	1994 (original), 2024 (refurbished)	Bolliger & Mabillard	Operating
Batman: The Ride	Six Flags Magic Mountain	1994	Bolliger & Mabillard	Operating
Raptor	Cedar Point	1994	Bolliger & Mabillard	Operating
Condor	Walibi Holland	1994	Vekoma	Operating
Diavlo	Himeji Central Park	1994	Bolliger & Mabillard	Operating
Batman: The Ride	Six Flags St. Louis	1995	Bolliger & Mabillard	Operating
T3	Kentucky Kingdom	1995	Vekoma	Closed
Eurostar	German Traveling Fairs	1995	Intamin/Giovanola	Operating
Flight Deck	Canada's Wonderland	1995	Vekoma	Operating
Arkham Asylum - Shock Therapy; Lethal Weapon - The Ride	Warner Bros. Movie World	1995	Vekoma	Closed 2019
The Great Nor'easter	Morey's Piers	1995	Vekoma	Operating
Professor Screamore's Skywinder	Six Flags America	1995	Vekoma	SBNO
Montu	Busch Gardens Tampa Bay	1996	Bolliger & Mabillard	Operating
Batman: The Ride	Six Flags Over Georgia	1997	Bolliger & Mabillard	Operating
The Great White	SeaWorld San Antonio	1997	Bolliger & Mabillard	Operating
Mind Eraser	Six Flags Darien Lake	1997	Vekoma	Operating
The Riddler Revenge	Six Flags New England	1997	Vekoma	Operating
Mind Eraser	Elitch Gardens	1997	Vekoma	Operating
Pyrenees	Parque Espana-Shima Spain Village	1997	Bolliger & Mabillard	Operating
Alpengeist	Busch Gardens Williamsburg	1997	Bolliger & Mabillard	Operating
Great Bear	Hersheypark	1998	Bolliger & Mabillard	Operating
Linear Gale	Tokyo Dome City	1998	Intamin	Closed 2010
Volcano: The Blast Coaster	Kings Dominion	1998	Intamin	Closed 2018
Blue Tornado	Gardaland	1998	Vekoma	Operating
Kong; Formerly The Hangman	Six Flags Discovery Kingdom; Opryland	1998; 1995	Vekoma	Operating; Closed 1997
Anaconda	Gold Reef City	1999	Giovanola	Operating
Tornado	Parque de Atracciones de Madrid	1999	Intamin	Operating
Batman: The Ride	Six Flags Over Texas	1999	Bolliger & Mabillard	Operating
Dragon Challenge	Islands of Adventure	1999	Bolliger & Mabillard	Closed 2017
Afterburn	Carowinds	1999	Bolliger & Mabillard	Operating
|Wild Adventures	1999	Vekoma	Operating	
Invertigo	Kings Island	1999	Vekoma	Operating
Katun	Mirabilandia	2000	Bolliger & Mabillard	Operating
Batman: The Ride	Six Flags Mexico	2000	Vekoma	Operating
MP Xpress	Movie Park Germany	2001	Vekoma	Operating
Talon	Dorney Park & Wildwater Kingdom	2001	Bolliger & Mabillard	Operating
Tornado	Särkänniemi	2001	Intamin	Operating
The Flash: Vertical Velocity; Formerly V2: Vertical Velocity	Six Flags Great America	2001	Intamin	Operating
Batman: Arkham Asylum	Parque Warner Madrid	2002	Bolliger & Mabillard	Operating
Stunt Fall	Parque Warner Madrid	2002	Vekoma	Operating
Wicked Twister	Cedar Point	2002	Intamin	Closed 2021
Le Vampire	La Ronde	2002	Bolliger & Mabillard	Operating
The Flash: Vertical Velocity; Formerly V2: Vertical Velocity	Six Flags Discovery Kingdom	2002	Intamin	Operating
Sky Rocket	Dreamworld	2002	Vekoma	Operating
Jubilee Odyssey	Fantasy Island	2002	Vekoma	Operating
Nemesis Inferno	Thorpe Park	2003	Bolliger & Mabillard	Operating
Swamp Thing	Wild Adventures	2003	Vekoma	Operating
Kiddy Hawk	Carowinds	2003	Vekoma	Operating
Steel Venom	Valleyfair	2003	Intamin	Operating
Unknown; Formerly Lightning	Wonderla Amusement Park Chennai; Kuwait Entertainment City	2025; 2004	Bolliger & Mabillard	Under construction Closed 2016
Silver Bullet	Knott's Berry Farm	2004	Bolliger & Mabillard	Operating
Bat	Lagoon	2005	Vekoma	Operating
Patriot	Worlds of Fun	2006	Bolliger & Mabillard	Operating
Black Mamba	Phantasialand	2006	Bolliger & Mabillard	Operating
Kumali	Flamingo Land Resort	2006	Vekoma	Operating
Infusion; Formerly Traumatizer	Pleasure Beach Blackpool; Pleasureland Southport	2007; 1999	Vekoma	Operating; Closed 2006
Jimmy Neutron's Atomic Flyer	Movie Park Germany	2007	Vekoma	Operating
Kvasten	Gröna Lund	2007	Vekoma	Operating
Phaethon	Gyeongju World	2007	Bolliger & Mabillard	Operating
Chupacabra; Formerly Goliath; Formerly Batman: The Ride; Formerly Gambit	Six Flags Fiesta Texas; Six Flags New Orleans; Thrill Valley	2008; 2003; 1995	Bolliger & Mabillard	Operating; Closed 2005; Closed 2002
Thunderhawk	Michigan's Adventure; Geauga Lake	2008; 1998	Vekoma	Operating; Closed 2007
Possessed; Formerly Steel Venom	Dorney Park & Wildwater Kingdom; Geauga Lake	2008; 2000	Intamin	Operating; Closed 2006
Aftershock; Formerly Déjà Vu	Silverwood Theme Park; Six Flags Great America	2008; 2001	Vekoma	Operating; Closed 2007
Steel Lasso	Frontier City	2008	Vekoma	Operating
The Monster; Formerly Orochi	Walygator Parc; Expoland	2010; 1996	Bolliger & Mabillard	Operating; Closed 2007
Ednör - L'Attaque; Formerly Serial Thriller	La Ronde; Six Flags Astroworld	2010; 1999	Vekoma	Operating; Closed 2005
Battlestar Galactica: Cylon	Universal Studios Singapore	2010	Vekoma	Operating
Sky Mountain; Formerly Déjà Vu	Mirabilandia; Six Flags Over Georgia	2011; 2001	Vekoma	Operating; Closed 2007
Mountain Peak	Jinjiang Action Park	2011	Vekoma	Operating
Goliath; Formerly Déjà Vu	Six Flags New England; Six Flags Magic Mountain	2012; 2001	Vekoma	Closed 2019-2021; Closed 2011
OzIris	Parc Astérix	2012	Bolliger & Mabillard	Operating
Banshee	Kings Island	2014	Bolliger & Mabillard	Operating
Family Inverted Coaster	Happy Valley	2014	Bolliger & Mabillard	Operating
Arthur - The Ride	Europa-Park	2014	Mack Rides	Operating
Hals-über-Kopf	Erlebnispark Tripsdrill	2020	Vekoma	Operating
Monster	Gröna Lund	2021	Bolliger & Mabillard	Operating
Storm - The Dragon Legend	Tusenfryd	2023	Gerstlauer	Operating
Phoenix Rising	Busch Gardens Tampa	2024	Bolliger & Mabillard	Operating
Infinity Inverted Coaster	Parque del Café	2025	Gerstlauer	Under construction
Na Fianna Force	Emerald Park	2024	Vekoma	Operating
Big Bad Wolf: The Wolf's Revenge	Busch Gardens Williamsburg	2025	Bolliger & Mabillard	Operating
Big Lego Coaster	Legoland Shanghai	2025	Bolliger & Mabillard	Operating
Barracuda Strike	SeaWorld San Antonio	2026	Bolliger & Mabillard	Operating

== Gallery ==
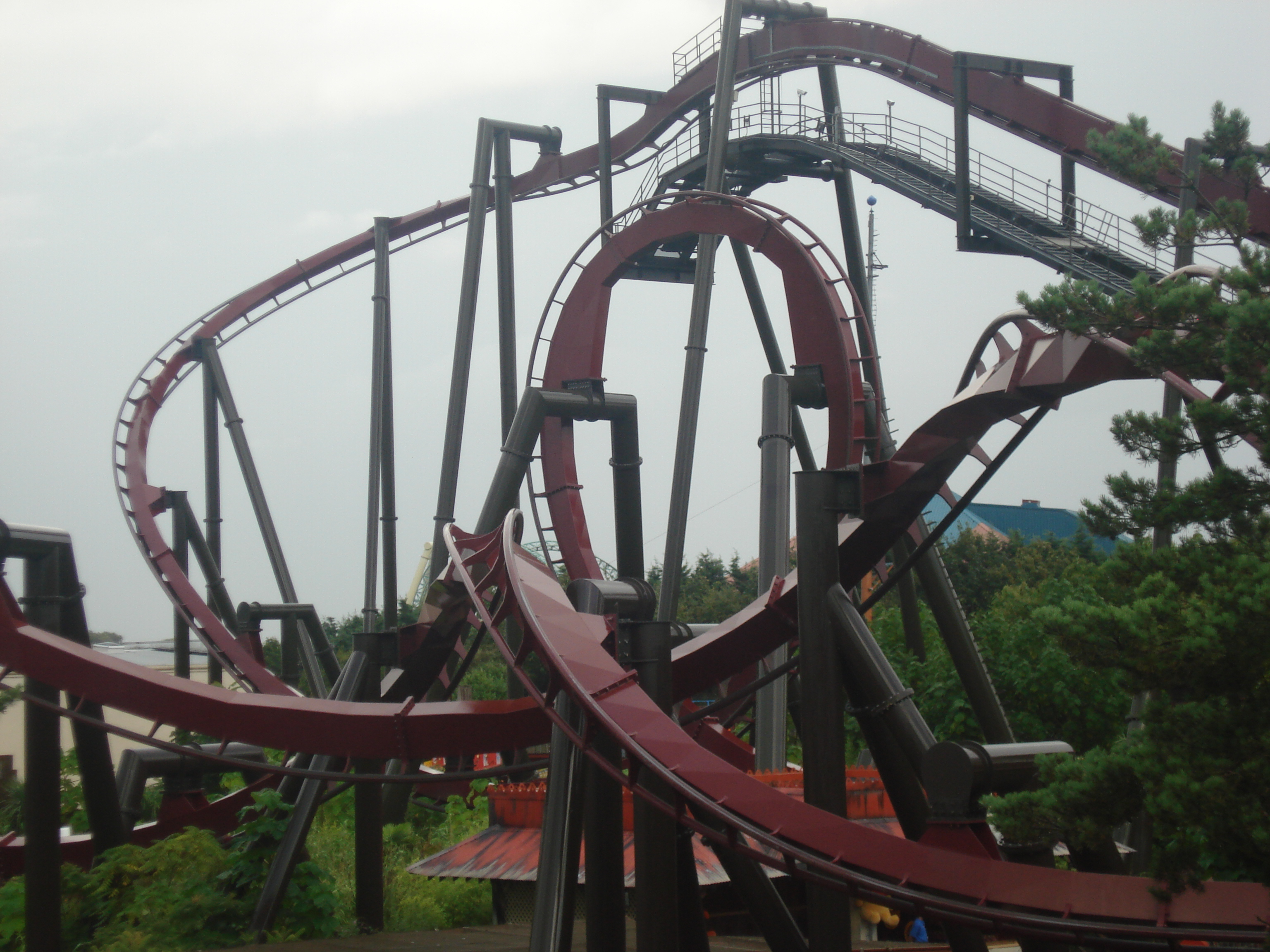
A Bolliger & Mabillard inverted roller coaster, Nemesis Inferno at Thorpe Park

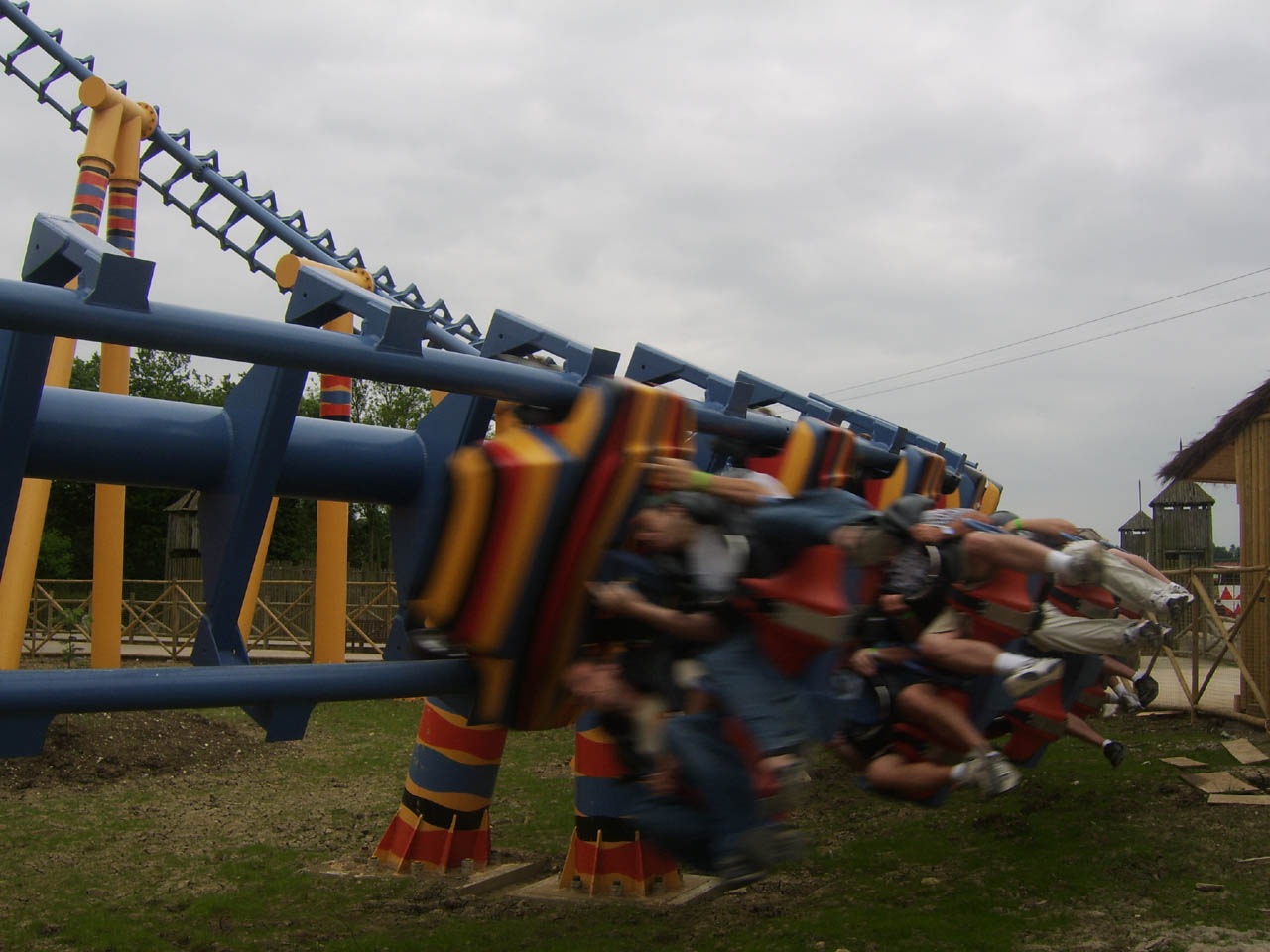
A Vekoma built inverted coaster, Kumali at Flamingo Land Resort

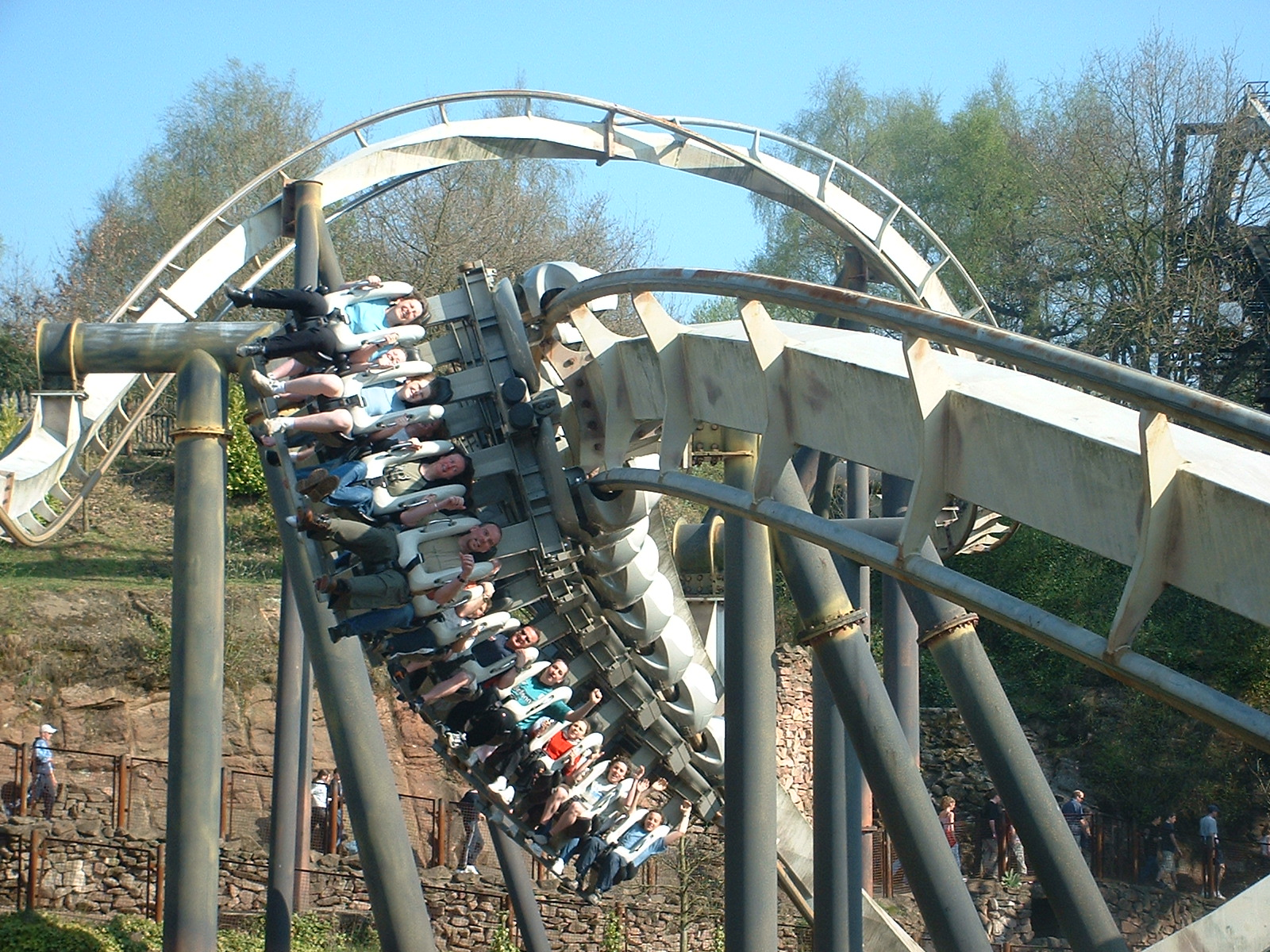
A Bolliger & Mabillard inverted coaster, Nemesis at Alton Towers

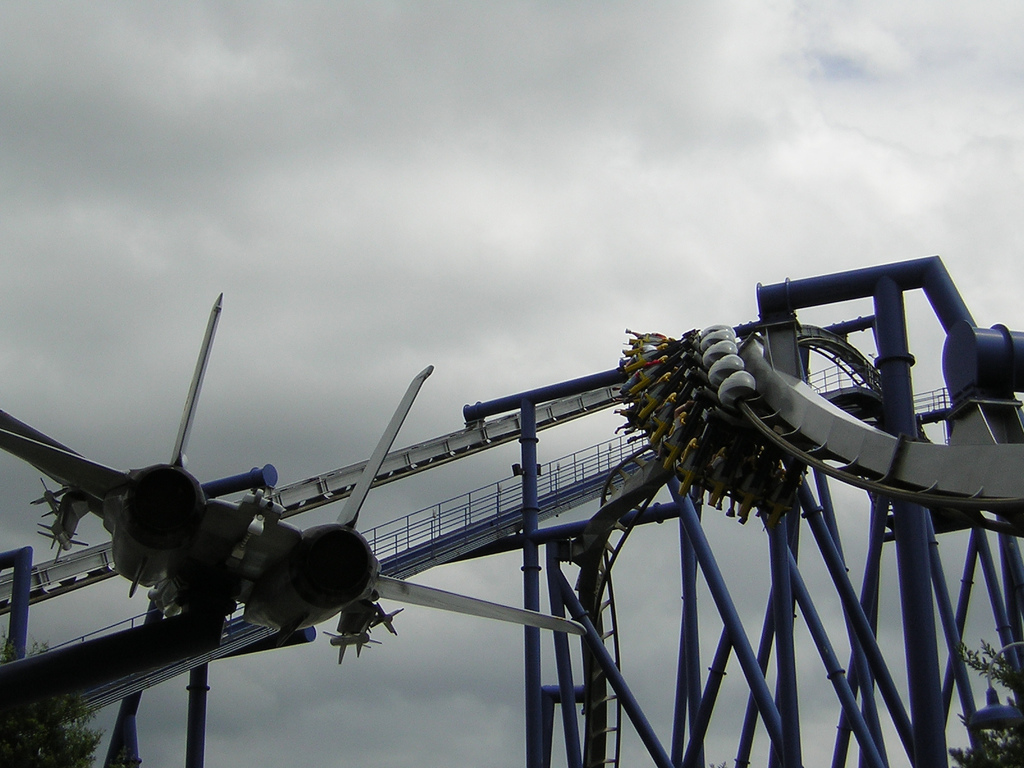
A Bolliger & Mabillard inverted coaster, Afterburn at Carowinds

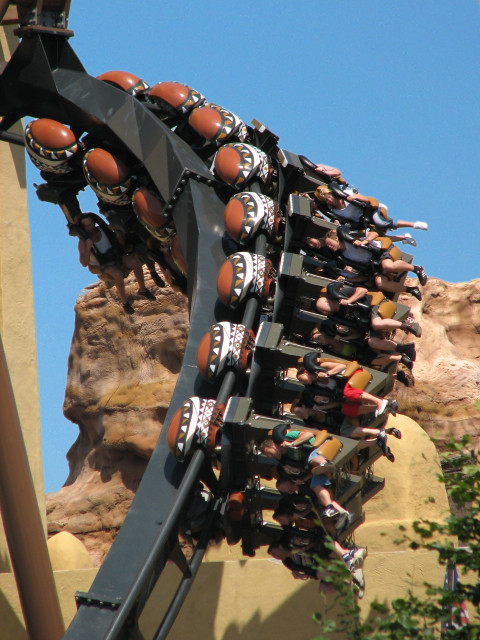
A Bolliger & Mabillard inverted coaster, Black Mamba at Phantasialand

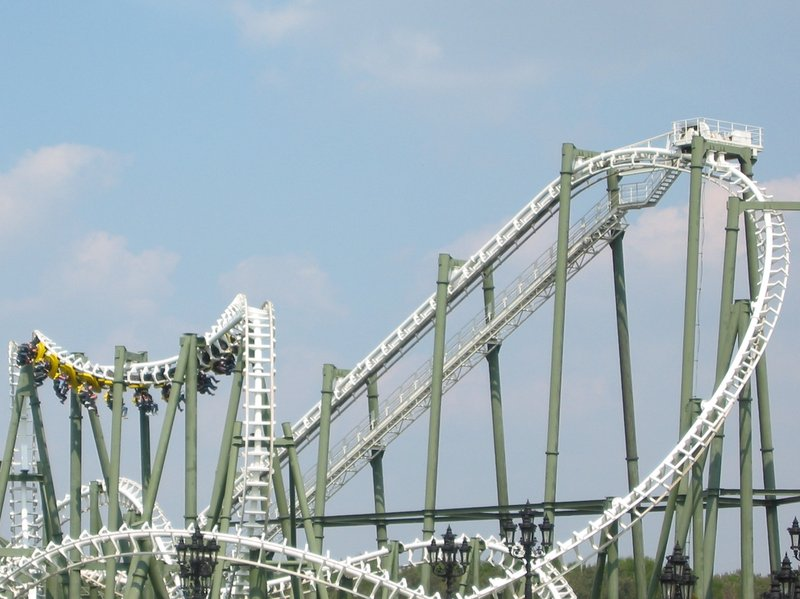
A Vekoma inverted coaster, Limit at Heide Park

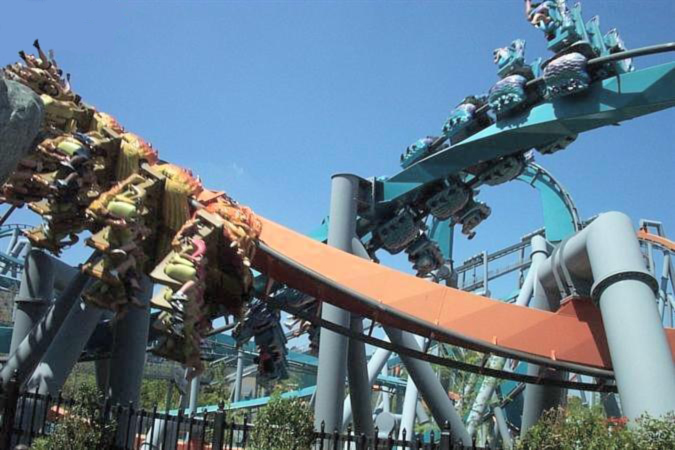
The only Bolliger & Mabillard dueling inverted coaster, Dragon Challenge at Islands of Adventure

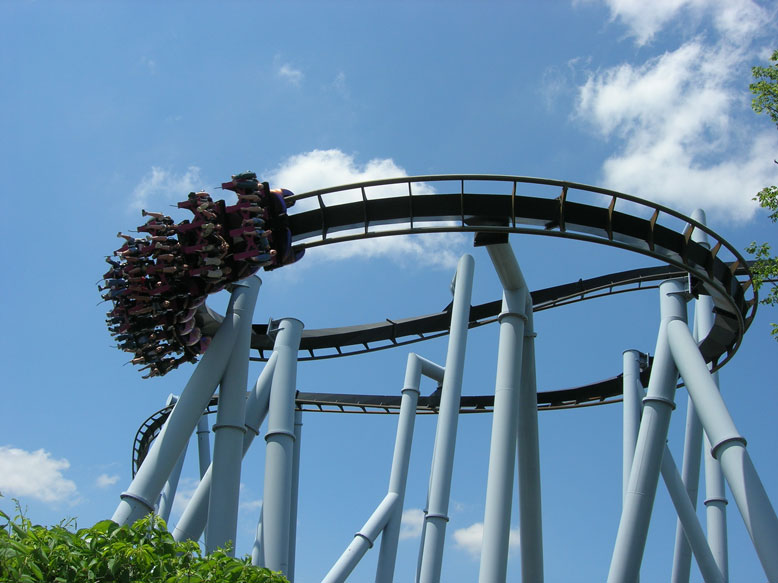
A Bolliger & Mabillard inverted coaster, Great Bear at Hershey Park

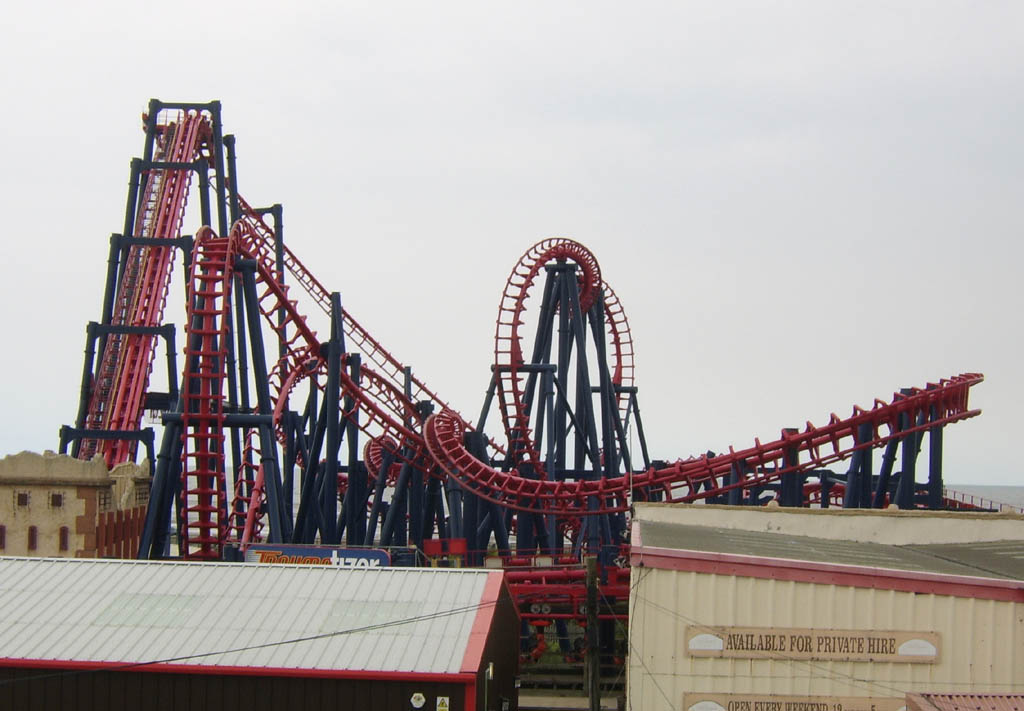
A former Vekoma inverted coaster, Traumatizer at Pleasureland Southport

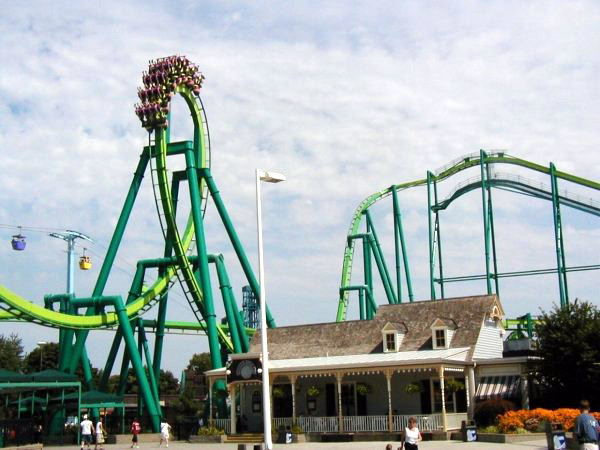
A Bolliger & Mabillard inverted coaster, Raptor at Cedar Point

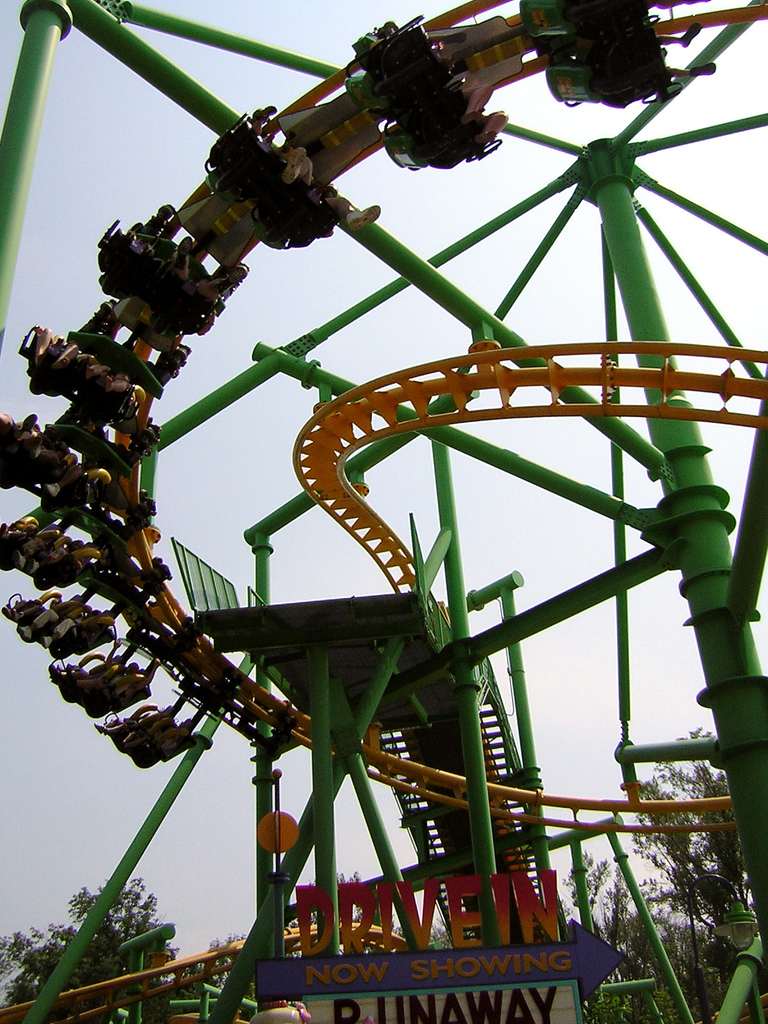
A Vekoma family inverted coaster, Flying Ace Aerial Chase at Kings Island

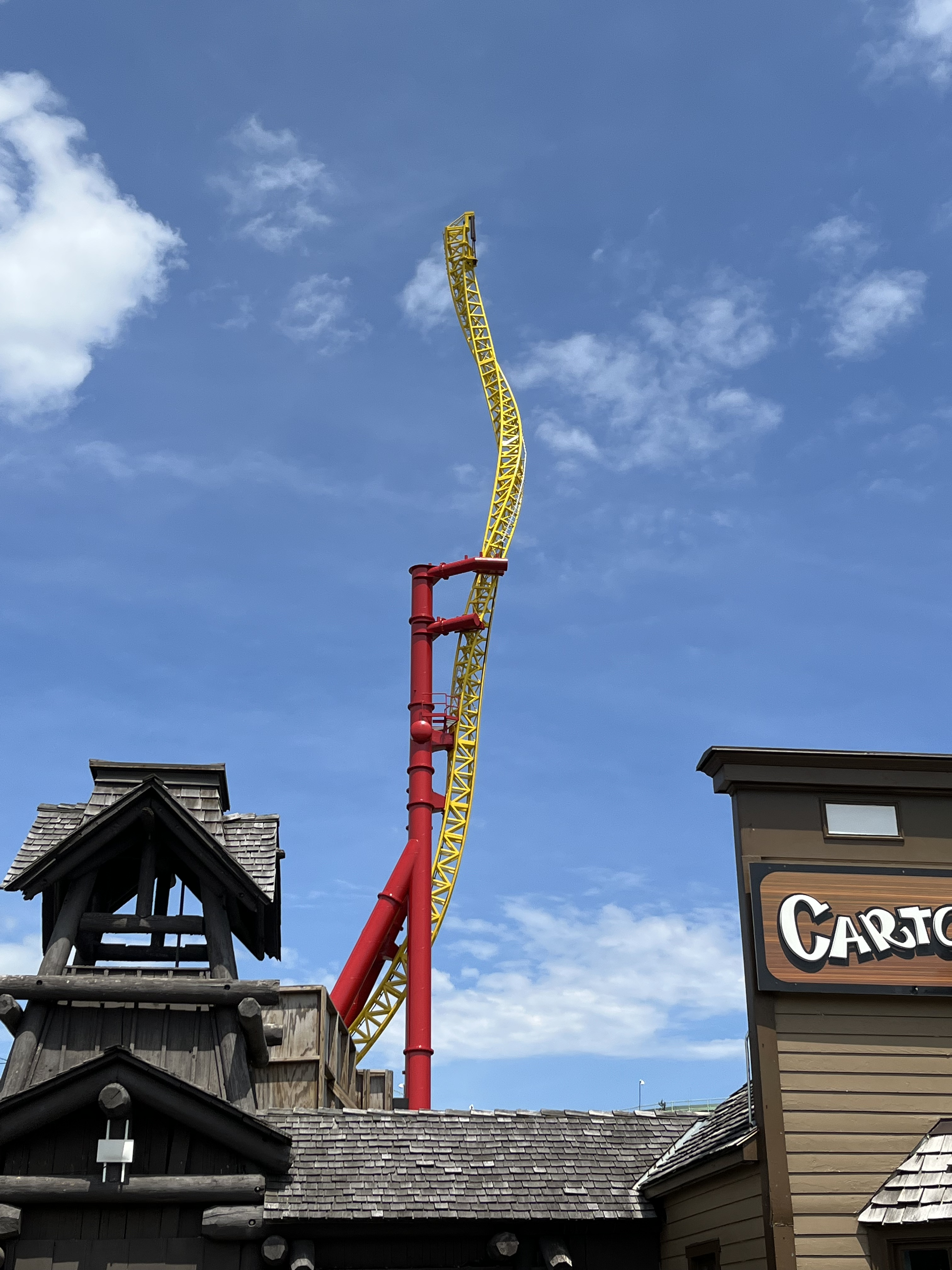
An Intamin launched shuttle inverted coaster, The Flash: Vertical Velocity at Six Flags Great America

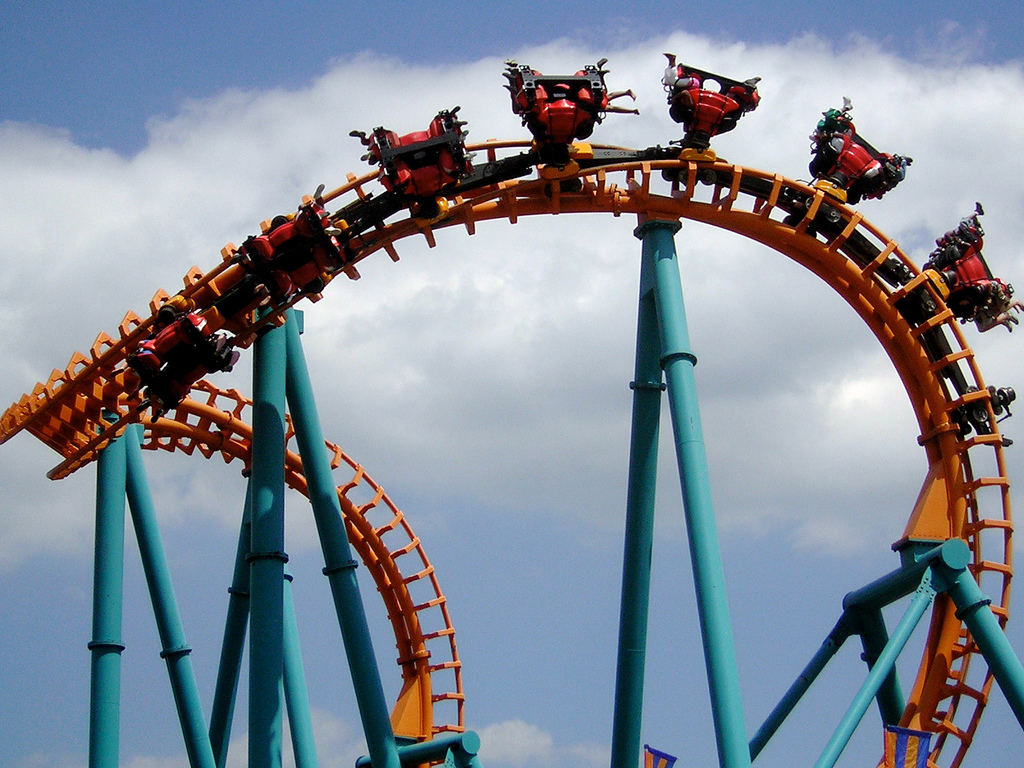
A former Vekoma shuttle inverted coaster, Two Face: The Flip Side at Six Flags America

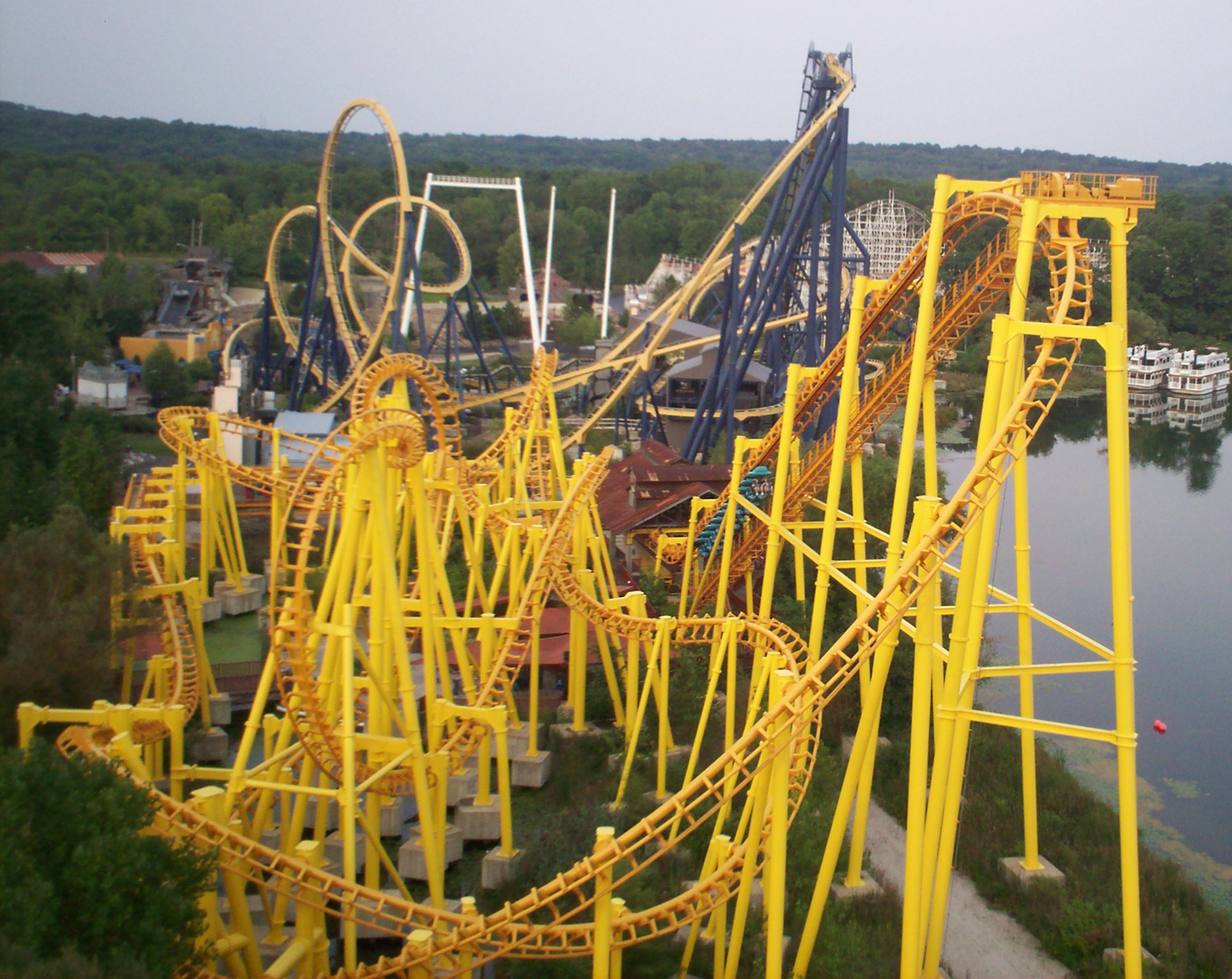
A Vekoma inverted coaster, Thunderhawk while at Geauga Lake

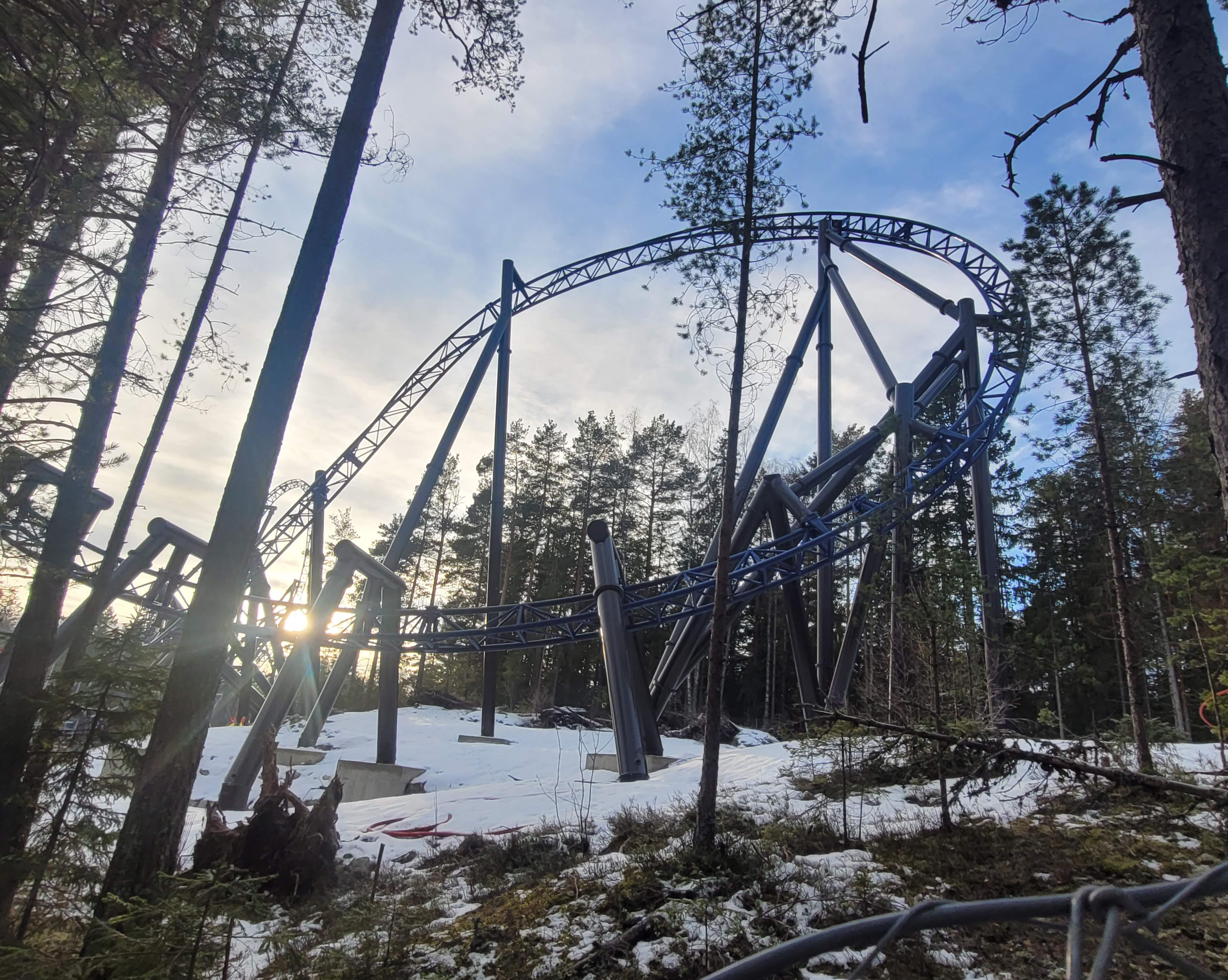
A Gerstlauer infinity inverted coaster, Storm - The Dragon Legend at Tusenfryd

== See also ==
- Wing Coaster
- Suspended roller coaster
- Pipeline roller coaster
