= DareDeviler =

Roller coaster in Ontario, Canada

- Previously known as Top Gun (1995–2007); Flight Deck (2008-2025)
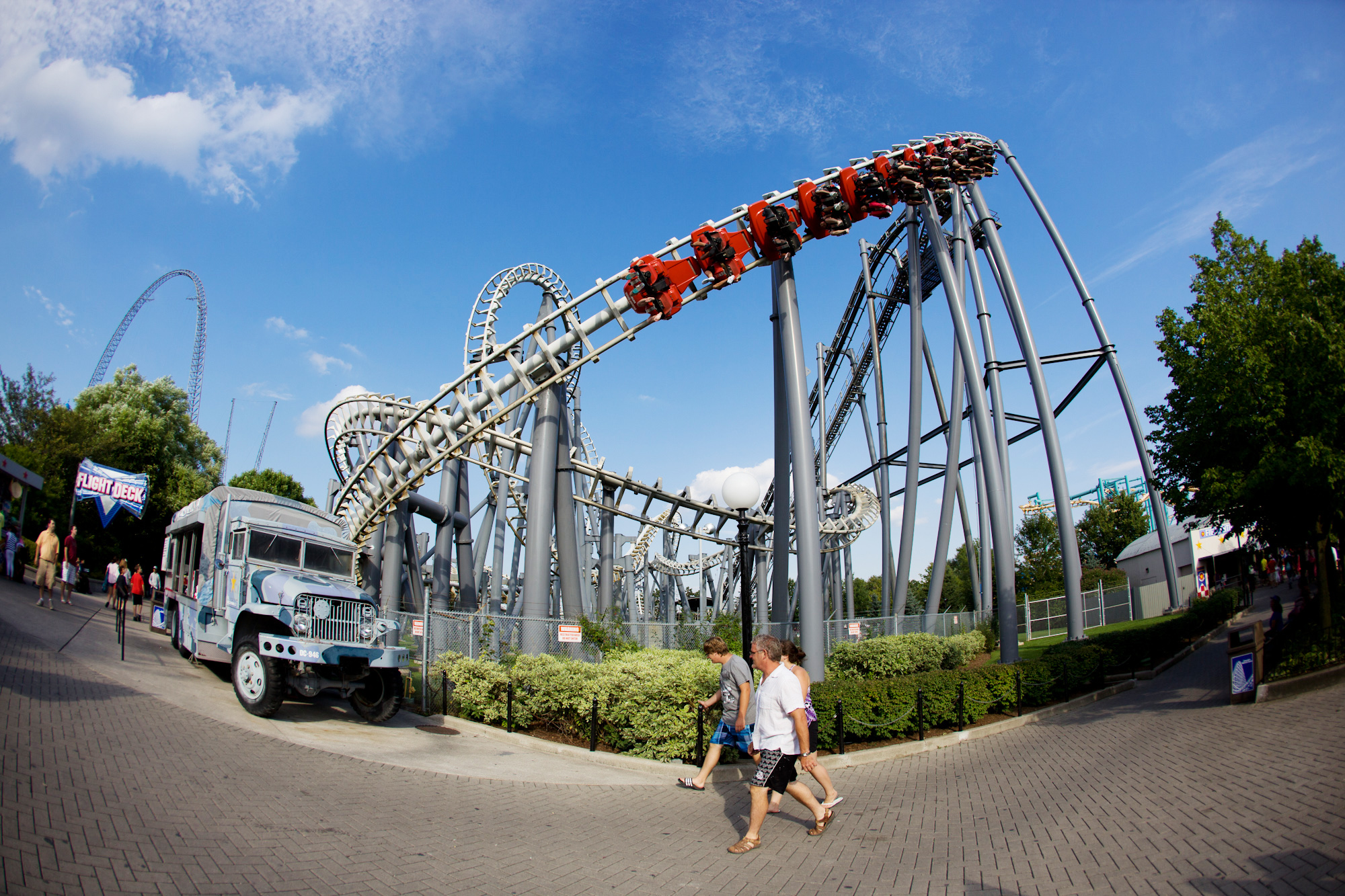
- DareDeviler ride near the entrance to the ride in 2011

Canada's Wonderland
- Location: Canada's Wonderland
- Park section: Grande World Exposition of 1890
- Coordinates: 43°50′28.46″N 79°32′20.47″W
- Status: Operating
- Opening date: 1995

General statistics
- Type: Steel – Inverted
- Manufacturer: Vekoma
- Model: SLC (689m Standard)
- Lift/launch system: Chain lift
- Height: 33.31 m (109.3 ft)
- Length: 689.01 m (2,260.5 ft)
- Speed: 79.99 km/h (49.70 mph)
- Inversions: 5
- Duration: 1:28
- Capacity: 1040 riders per hour
- Height restriction: 132–198 cm (4 ft 4 in – 6 ft 6 in)
- Trains: 2 trains with 10 cars. Riders are arranged 2 across in a single row for a total of 20 riders per train.
- Fast Lane available
- DareDeviler at RCDB

DareDeviler is an inverted roller coaster located at Canada's Wonderland in Vaughan, Ontario, Canada. It originally opened in 1995 under the name Top Gun. It was renamed Flight Deck in 2008 after Paramount Parks sold Canada's Wonderland to Cedar Fair, which necessitated the gradual removal of all Paramount names and trademarks from the theme park. In 2026, it received another new theme and name along with new trains and track improvements.

== History ==
The roller coaster was based on the 1986 film Top Gun (produced by Paramount Pictures, a sister company of Paramount Parks), and is meant to simulate the feeling of riding in an F-14 fighter jet. The ride was themed heavily after the movie, with various props alongside the queue, including models of the F-14 aircraft, hangars, radar installations, army trucks, and informational posters about the making of the movie. The "Top Gun" movie theme had marked a shift in the design of the park, as the ride no longer matched the theme of the "land" in which it was situated.

When Vekoma announced the 689m Standard Suspended Looping Coaster, Paramount had cancelled their plans with Bolliger & Mabillard (B&M) to make an inverted coaster. This was due to Cedar Point's contract on having no B&M inverted coaster in the 321.9 kilometres (200.0 miles) radius of a Cedar Fair park. Because Canada's Wonderland was situated 318.6 kilometres (198.0 miles) from Cedar Point, the custom inverted coaster was cancelled and the SLC was put in place. The ride was built where the "Zumba Flume" (a water log ride) was once located, and became the flagship ride in the park until being succeeded by Behemoth in 2008. The ride was renamed Flight Deck in 2008 following the park's sale to Cedar Fair.

== Characteristics ==
=== Top Gun/Flight Deck ===
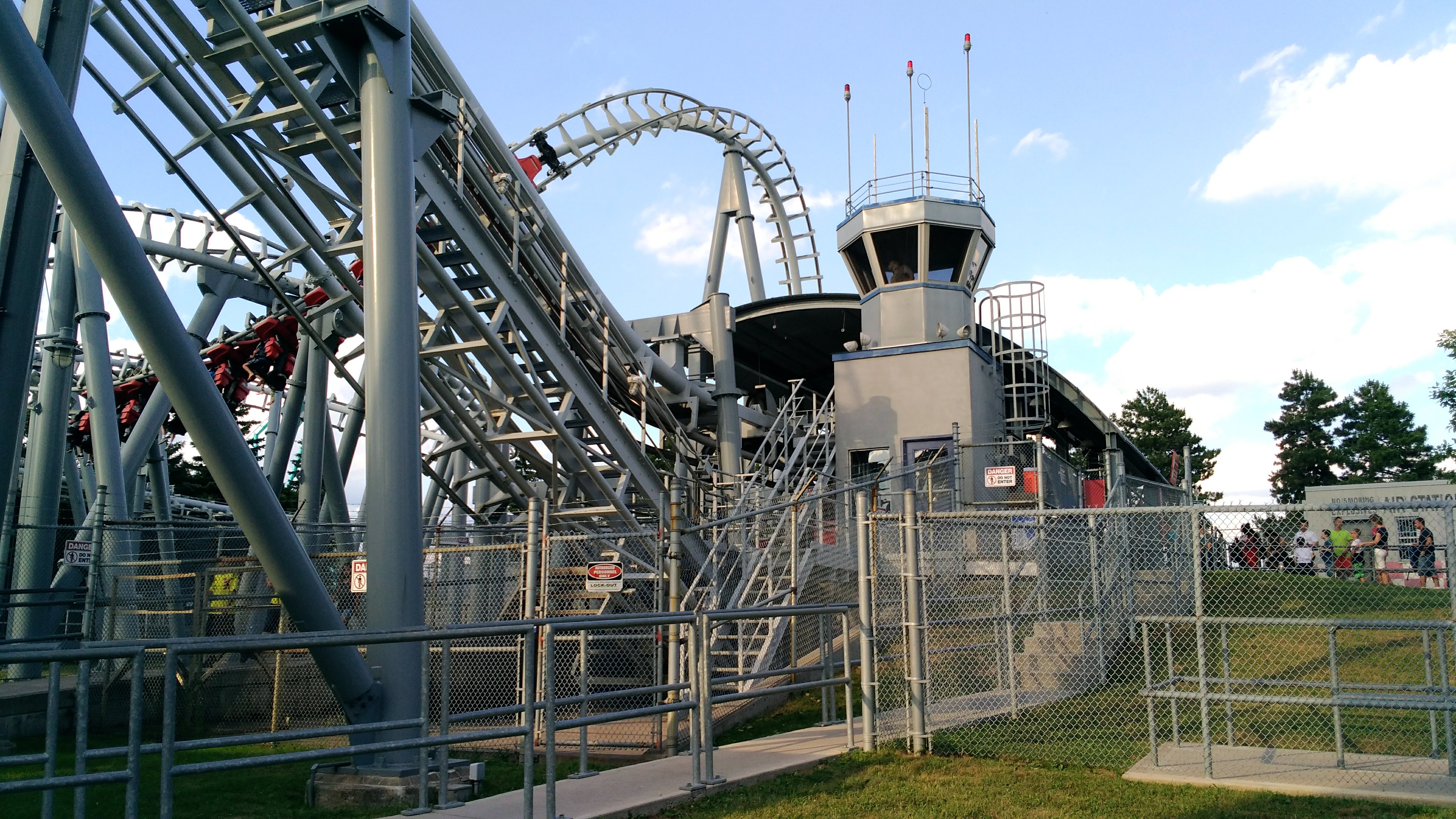
The ride was themed as an RCAF hangar

The station of Flight Deck was shaped like an airplane hangar. The queue and station for the ride was under the hangar. Previously around the hangar were many military objects that are themed to the movie Top Gun. Some of those objects included trucks, airplanes, and radar.

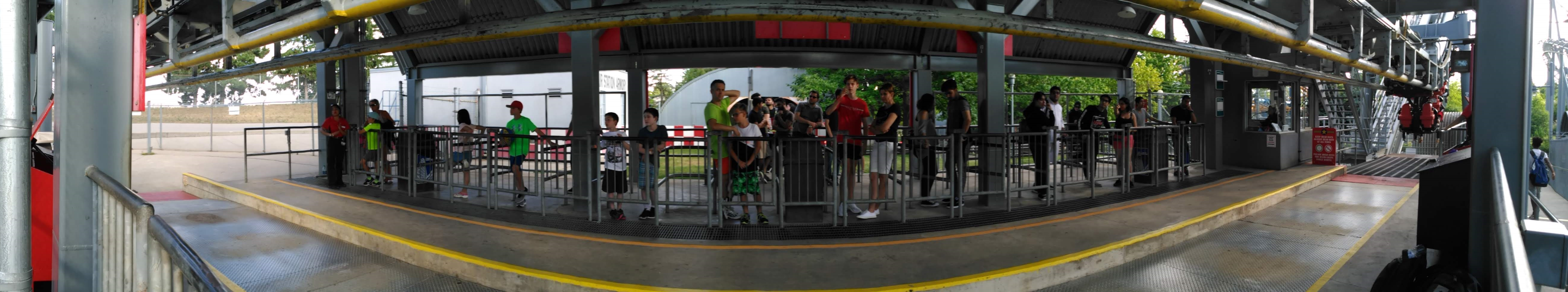
Panoramic view of Flight Deck's station

The colours of Flight Deck matched the theme of Top Gun. The ride's supports were grey with the track coloured a lighter shade of grey. The trains on Flight Deck were coloured mainly red.

=== DareDeviler ===
The switch from Flight Deck to DareDeviler brought about more changes for the 2026 season. The F-14 model aircraft was removed from the queue, but “track refinements” and new trains were announced for the ride.

== Ride mechanics ==
DareDeviler features a number of roller coaster elements including a sea serpent roll (two inversions), a sidewinder loop, and a double inline twist. Trains begin by climbing the nearly 30.5-metre-tall (100 ft) chain lift hill. Then, the trains go down the hill which does a 90-degree turn to the right on the way down, reaching a top speed of 80 kilometres per hour (50 mph). The train then traverses a half loop, an inline roll, and another half loop, followed by a turn and a sidewinder. Next, DareDeviler's trains go through a 180-degree turn and two barrel rolls. Lastly, the trains make another 180-degree turn and head into the final brake run.

=== Trains ===
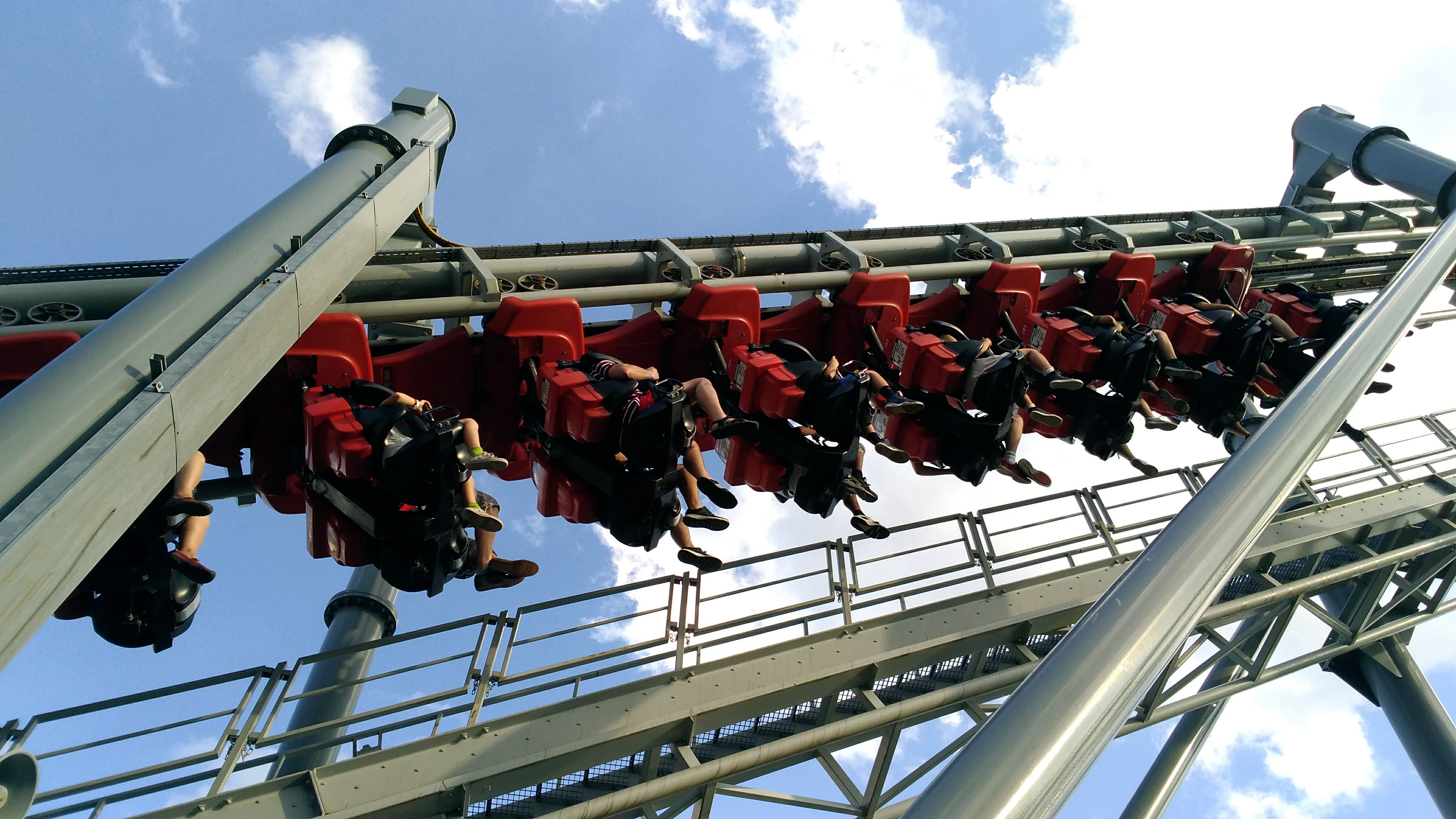
The trains to DareDeviler are inverted, with the passenger's feet able to hang freely; the trains shown are the original first-generation trains

The trains to DareDeviler are inverted, meaning that the passengers' feet hang free with no floor under them.

DareDeviler has two trains working all the time. Each of the two trains has ten cars, and each of the cars can hold two people. Therefore, each train can hold 20 passengers at a time and 40 passengers can ride DareDeviler at a time. The cars of DareDeviler's trains have a shoulder harness which is attached to the bottom of the seat with seatbelts.

The trains were originally named Maverick and Iceman, going along with the callsigns of the two pilots in the Top Gun film. For the 2010 season, the trains were renamed Firehawk and Raptor until the end of the 2025 season.

Since the closure of sister park Six Flags America in Woodmore, Maryland, near Washington, D.C. at the end of the 2025 season, DareDeviler received trains from that park's Professor Screamore's SkyWinder, itself also a Vekoma SLC, as these trains are the second-generation Vekoma SLC trains, which are more comfortable, as compared to the first-generation trains Flight Deck used before then. The second-generation trains will be active for the 2026 season.

== Reception ==
USA Today gave the ride a poor review, saying "its ride is so rough it bats riders' ears mercilessly".

== In popular culture ==
A scene from the TV show Flashpoint was filmed on the evacuation stairs of Flight Deck during the 2008–2009 offseason. The episode aired on April 10, 2009, and is titled "The Perfect Family".
