= Flight Deck (California's Great America) =

Roller coaster in Santa Clara, California

- Previously known as Top Gun (1993–2006)

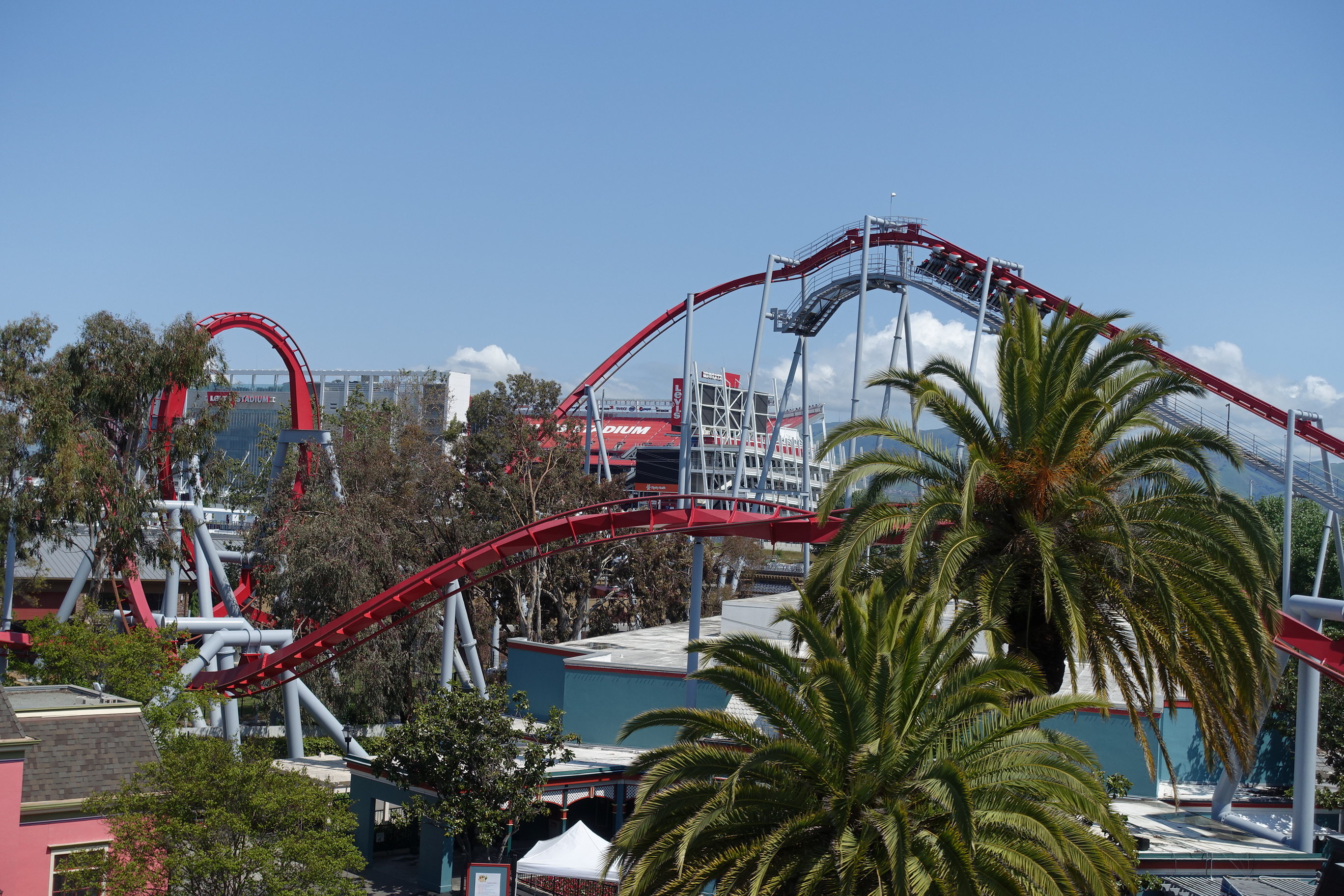
- Flight Deck with Levi's Stadium in the background

California's Great America
- Location: California's Great America
- Park section: Orleans Place
- Coordinates: 37°23′53″N 121°58′18″W
- Status: Operating
- Opening date: March 20, 1993

General statistics
- Type: Steel – Inverted
- Manufacturer: Bolliger & Mabillard
- Designer: Werner Stengel
- Model: Inverted Coaster
- Height: 102 ft (31 m)
- Drop: 91 ft (28 m)
- Length: 2,260 ft (690 m)
- Speed: 50 mph (80 km/h)
- Inversions: 3
- Duration: 2:26
- Capacity: 1380 riders per hour
- G-force: 4.5
- Height restriction: 54 in (137 cm)
- Trains: 2 trains with 7 cars; riders arranged 4 across in a single row for a total of 28 riders per train
- Fast Lane available
- Flight Deck at RCDB

Flight Deck is an inverted roller coaster located at California's Great America in Santa Clara, California. Built by Bolliger & Mabillard and designed by Werner Stengel, the roller coaster made its debut as Top Gun on March 20, 1993. Paramount Parks acquired several parks in 1992 and themed new coasters already under development at various locations to the Top Gun film, seeking to expand its entertainment opportunities and promote its films. The line queue and station was themed to an aircraft carrier with various props and displays. After Paramount sold its amusement park chain to Cedar Fair in 2006, the roller coaster was rebranded as Flight Deck.

Flight Deck reaches a height of 102 ft (31 m), a maximum speed of 50 mph (80 km/h), and features a total track length of 2,260 ft (690 m). It is the second inverted coaster to be built by Bolliger & Mabillard. The roller coaster was well-received by the public in its inaugural season.

== History ==
Paramount Communications Inc. announced intentions to purchase Kings Entertainment Company for $400 million on July 31, 1992. The planned acquisition involved the transfer of four theme parks owned or operated by the Kings Entertainment Company to Paramount, which included Great America. Paramount was one of several entertainment companies that would acquire or purchase stakes in amusement parks to expand live entertainment opportunities and promote films. It was expected Paramount would develop rides based on films and franchises such as Top Gun, Star Trek, or The Addams Family.

Great America became Paramount's Great America under the newly formed Paramount Parks, which planned to expand thematic elements in their park, including the addition of a Top Gun attraction to open in March 1993. The new coaster was revealed to be an inverted model with a length of 2,260 ft (690 m), and would feature an elaborately-themed line queue. Construction on the station began in January 1993. Top Gun later opened with the park for the 1993 season on March 20, which was the first operating season under Paramount's new ownership. Top Gun was one of many movie-inspired attractions to open that season, which included Batman: The Ride at Six Flags Great Adventure, Jaws at Universal Studios Florida, and Back to the Future: The Ride at Universal Studios Hollywood.

Paramount sold off its amusement park properties, including Great America, to Cedar Fair in 2006. The Top Gun theming was removed, and its name was changed to Flight Deck.

California's Great America shares a parking lot with Levi’s Stadium, home of the San Francisco 49ers. Before Super Bowl LVIII, the park made a friendly bet with sister park Worlds of Fun, which is based in the home city of the Kansas City Chiefs. The two NFL teams were facing off, and the theme park rooting for the team that lost would have to rename one of their rides in honor of the winning team. The Chiefs won, so Great America chose to rename Flight Deck, calling it "Soaring Chiefs" for the 2024 opening weekend, complete with a new logo that resembled the Chiefs logo.

== Ride experience ==
The train departs making a small right turn out of the station, ascending the 100 ft (30 m) chain lift hill. The drop at the top of the hill begins with a sharp left turn. After the initial drop of 91 ft (28 m), the train reaches its maximum speed of 50 mph (80 km/h). The train enters a vertical loop, then performs a right-banked 270-degree turn before dipping down and up into a zero-gravity roll. Following the inversion, the train makes a short dive and then banks left into a flat right turn. The train then maneuvers into a shallow drop, immediately followed by a corkscrew. Exiting the corkscrew, the train enters a left-banked 270-degree turn over a pond before turning right into the brake run and station. One roller coaster cycle takes around two minutes and twenty-six seconds to complete.

== Characteristics ==
Flight Deck is a custom Inverted Coaster model manufactured by Bolliger & Mabillard (B&M) and designed by Werner Stengel. Upon opening, the roller coaster was the second B&M Inverted Coaster model to be built. Flight Deck operates with two trains. Each of the two trains can accommodate 28 passengers, arranged in seven rows with four to a single row. Each seat features an over-the-shoulder restraint. The roller coaster exerts 4.5 g-forces to its riders. Flight Deck has a total track length of 2,260 ft (690 m). Flight Deck was repainted in 2014 to feature a red track and white support color scheme.

The original roller coaster was themed to the Top Gun film. The roller coaster itself represented the F-14 Tomcat Tom Cruise's character piloted, with guests said to assemble for a military conflict. The queue area presented various displays of an aircraft carrier, including a tower, storage facilities, and an engine. The queue area played songs from the film's soundtrack, as well as voice clips from the film. A large mural was created depicting "Fightertown, USA", an homage to Miramar's Air Station, on one side with an aircraft carrier on the other. The station represented the flight deck of the aircraft carrier, with ride operators adorned in relevant uniforms. When renamed to Flight Deck, the roller coaster received a new color scheme. During the 2021 off-season, the park revitalized the queue area to restore the classic aircraft theming.

== Incidents and accidents ==
A 24-year-old man was killed on the site of Top Gun on September 7, 1998. The man's wife had lost her hat while riding the roller coaster, and the man had gone under a section of track to retrieve it. A park official stated the victim had to pass through a door marked "Do not enter" and cross a 6 ft (1.8 m) fence to enter the area where the hat had fallen. There, he was struck in the head by the foot of a 20-year-old female rider on the roller coaster. The female rider was treated at a local hospital for a broken leg. The man, who was visiting from Mexico, was said to only speak Spanish and could not read the English safety signs displayed.

An employee working Flight Deck was seriously injured after being struck by a train moving into the roller coaster's station on June 12, 2015. A passenger on the roller coaster was also injured, sustaining injuries to their hand and legs when the employee retrieved an item in the train's path. The roller coaster remained temporarily closed thereafter pending an investigation. Cedar Fair was later fined $70,200 by the California Division of Occupational Safety and Health relating to eight violations in safety, two pertaining to the accident.

== Reception ==
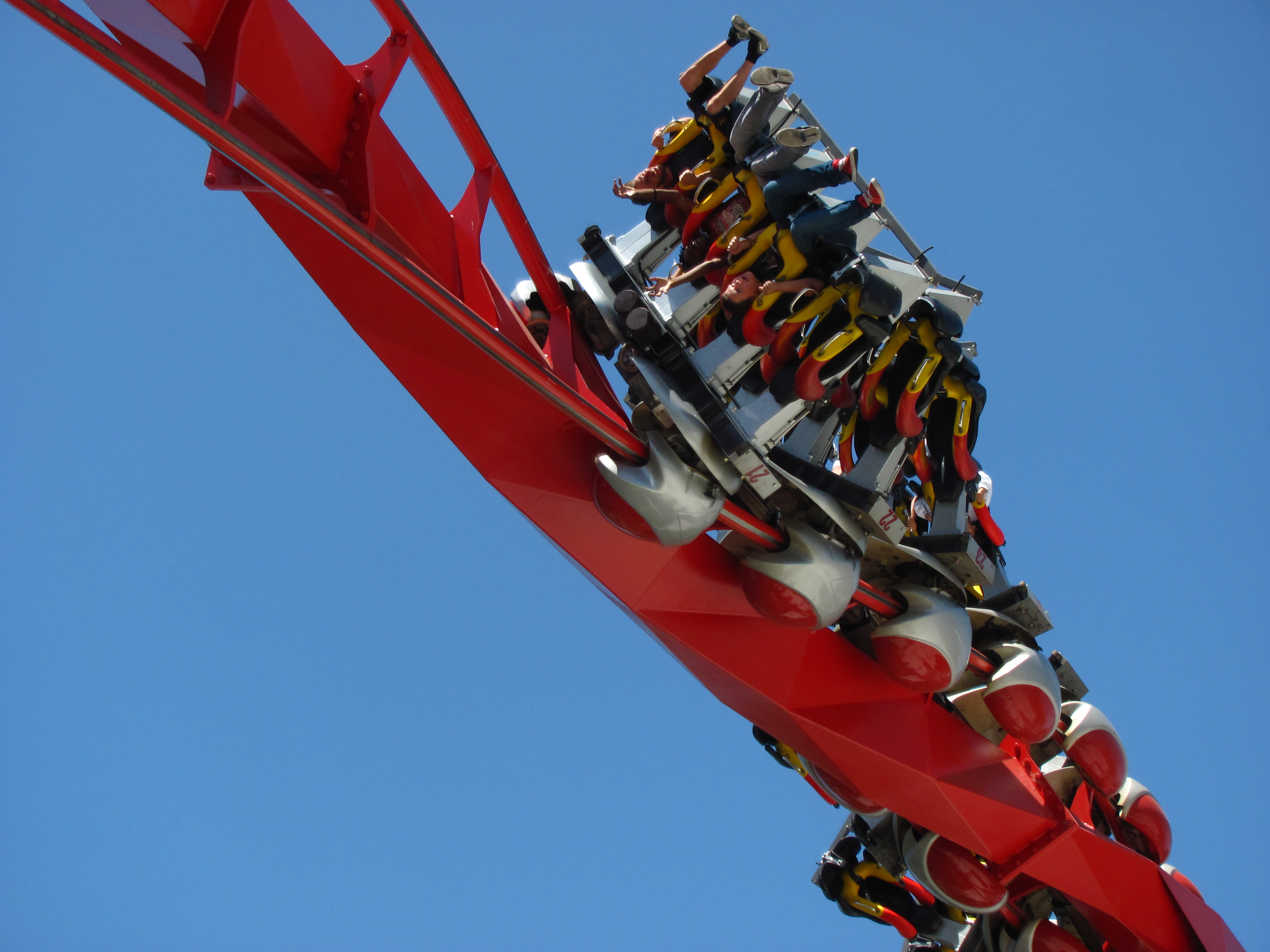
A train of Flight Deck traversing through the zero-gravity roll

Upon opening, the roller coaster received generally positive reviews from critics and guests. Cheri Matthews, a writer for The Modesto Bee, noted guest reactions to the roller coaster, with an American Coaster Enthusiast member stating it was their "favorite steel coaster" with another guest having exclaimed it was better than nearby steel roller coaster Vortex. Matthews also recorded several pilots' reactions to the roller coaster, with a former United States Air Force pilot stating the ride experience was not dissatisfying and a United States Navy Commander noting it was akin to a fighter jet, especially the vertical loop without the g-forces.

Susan Young, a writer for the Oakland Tribune, noted how she felt an adrenaline rush through the queue area's theming and overhead roller coaster. By the end of the roller coaster, Young remarked that Top Gun was "pure exhilaration", having restored her interest in roller coasters altogether. Leigh Grogan, a writer for The Sacramento Bee, commented that, "despite being a lifelong" wooden roller coaster fan, she gave "high marks" to the roller coaster's thematic experience, satisfied with the ride and its g-forces. Debra Salonen, writing for the Merced Sun-Star, positively noted the roller coaster's smoothness, speed, and excitement, simply concluding it was a "wow". Leah Smith, a reporter for the Press-Tribune, commented on the roller coaster's "breathtaking" elements alongside the in-depth theming that guests could expect waiting for the ride.

=== Awards ===
Golden Ticket Awards: Top steel Roller Coasters
Year									1998	1999
Ranking									–	–
Year	2000	2001	2002	2003	2004	2005	2006	2007	2008	2009
Ranking	–	–	–	45 (tie)	–	–	–	–	–	–
Year	2010	2011	2012	2013	2014	2015	2016	2017	2018	2019
Ranking	–	–	–	–	–	–	–	–	–	–
Year	2020	2021	2022	2023	2024	2025	2026			
Ranking	N/A	–	–	–	–	–	–			
