= Incidents at United Parks & Resorts properties =

This is a summary of notable incidents that have taken place at various United Parks & Resorts-owned amusement parks, water parks or theme parks. This list is not intended to be a comprehensive list of every such event, but only those that have a significant impact on the parks or park operations, or are otherwise significantly newsworthy.

The term incidents refers to major accidents, injuries, or deaths that occur at a SeaWorld Parks facility. While these incidents were required to be reported to regulatory authorities due to where they occurred, they usually fall into one of the following categories:

1. Caused by negligence on the part of a guest. This can be refusal to follow specific ride safety instructions, or deliberate intent to violate park rules.
2. The result of a guest's known, or unknown, health issues.
3. Negligence on the part of the park, either by ride operator or maintenance.
4. Act of God or a generic accident (e.g. slipping and falling) that is not a direct result of an action on anybody's part.

== Adventure Island ==
=== Key West Rapids ===
- On September 10, 2011, a 21-year-old lifeguard was killed after being struck by lightning while clearing guests from the Key West Rapids ride tower due to inclement weather. No injuries to guests were reported. The park installed a system to warn of incoming weather.

== Aquatica ==
=== Orlando, Florida location ===
==== Roa's Rapids ====
- On October 4, 2010, a 68-year-old man from Manchester, England was found unresponsive on Roa's Rapids. He was taken to Dr. Phillips Hospital but was later pronounced dead on arrival. Preliminary findings found he died of natural causes.
- On July 15, 2017, a 58-year-old man from Savannah, Georgia was also found unresponsive on Roa's Rapids. He died the next day. It was later revealed he had a history of health problems.

=== San Antonio, Texas location ===
==== Wahalla Wave ====
- On July 1, 2018, a woman was found unresponsive after riding the Wahalla Wave water slide. She was given CPR by lifeguards before being taken to a nearby Christus Santa Rosa Hospital.

==== Big Surf Shores ====
- On August 1, 2019, lifeguards responded to an incident where a 33-year-old man went into cardiac arrest while in the park's wave pool. He was taken to Christus Santa Rosa Westover Hills hospital by the San Antonio EMS and later died.

== Busch Gardens Tampa Bay ==
=== Cheetah Hunt ===
- On February 13, 2014, shortly after a train was dispatched from the station, a malfunction occurred causing the ride to stop, stranding 16 passengers approximately 60 feet (18 m) in the air for an hour. Firefighters from the city of Tampa evacuated all riders safely with no injuries.

=== Edge of Africa ===
- On May 12, 2002, a 21-year-old zookeeper had her arm bitten off at the elbow by a lion during a standard training exercise as she conducted a behind-the-scenes tour for her family. Investigators concluded that she likely inserted part of her hand through a 1 1/2-inch (38.1 mm) gap, contrary to policy. Park operations were not affected, and no park guests witnessed the accident.

=== Jungala ===
- On July 1, 2016, an orangutan escaped from its pen and entered the Stanleyville area of the park. Portions of the park were locked down and evacuated. This was the second orangutan escape in a one-month period, both of which occurred at Jungala.

=== Gwazi ===
- On July 24, 2006, a 52-year-old man from Palm Harbor, Florida died shortly after riding Gwazi. After riding, he had difficulty breathing, then collapsed. Paramedics performed CPR, but the victim was pronounced dead two hours later. The medical examiner's report showed that he suffered from high blood pressure and hardening of the arteries. The ride was closed for an hour after the incident to confirm that it was functioning properly.

=== Kumba ===
- On June 10, 1995, a 13-year-old girl from Pinellas Park, Florida, died shortly after riding Kumba, due to a rare heart condition that triggered a heart attack. Her mother sued the park and won a judgment of $500,000. The jury cited the park for failing to timely administer CPR and slowing rescue efforts. The jury also found the mother 30% responsible for the victim's death, thus reducing the award amount to $350,000 because the mother's previous drug abuse possibly contributed to the victim's health problems.
- On December 29, 1996, passengers on a train were evacuated after it stopped 100 feet (30 m) in the air, after which operators returned it to the loading area. Five people were taken to nearby hospitals in Tampa, Florida complaining of back pain after riding.

=== Montu ===
- On May 24, 2000, a 30-year-old man died from suffering a heart attack after riding the coaster. The victim had a preexisting heart ailment.

=== Other incidents involving guests ===
- On July 4, 2018, a 36-year-old man from Florahome, Florida was hit by a falling bullet from celebratory gunfire while visiting the park with his wife during Independence Day. At around 10:00 p.m. when the fireworks began, he felt shoulder pain. Park security responded and the man was airlifted to a nearby Tampa General Hospital with non-life-threatening injuries.

=== Python ===
- A few weeks after Python opened in 1976, a 39-year-old man died after riding. The ride's previous tagline, "I challenged the Python and lived!", was subsequently removed.

=== Rhino Rally ===
- On June 27, 2001, a ride vehicle overturned along the course of the attraction. Multiple riders suffered minor injuries and two were taken to the hospital.

=== Scorpion ===
- In December 1994, the roller coaster was part of a lawsuit filed against the park alleging that a model employed to portray a family figure for the park's promotional material was not allowed to disembark the coaster after voicing discomfort. The lawsuit alleged the park was liable for false imprisonment and negligence and sought $15,000 in damages for her injuries as she was forced to continue riding the roller coaster several times without a break. The lawsuit was later dismissed by the judge in 1997.

=== SheiKra ===
- On October 15, 2005, a technical glitch caused a problem with the ride's air compressor system. Passengers were stranded on the coaster's holding brake at the platform edge for nearly an hour until they were brought down by a rescue trolley.
- On May 12, 2016, a malfunction caused the ride to stop, stranding 24 riders 200 feet (61 m) in the air for up to two hours. Busch Gardens officials evacuated all of the 24 riders safely, and no injuries were reported. SheiKra reopened four days later.

=== Skyride ===
- On July 18, 2009, 20-year-old employee and South Florida Bulls football kicker Maikon Bonani from Lake Wales, Florida, fell approximately 35 feet (11 m) from the attraction. He was verifying that the gondola door was closed as the gondola left the station, and ended up being carried about 50 feet (15 m) along the ride. No guest was injured, and Bonani was taken to St. Joseph's Hospital.

== Busch Gardens Williamsburg ==
=== Apollo's Chariot ===
- On opening day for Apollo's Chariot on March 27, 1999, a stray goose collided with the front chariot in which Italian actor Fabio Lanzoni was seated. Fabio suffered a minor cut to his nose, leaving him with a bloody nose at the end of the ride.
- On July 15, 2018, a family from Virginia Beach, Virginia suffered injuries as they were riding the roller coaster due to a ride operator accidentally pressing the emergency stop button, causing them to report concussions the next day.

=== Big Bad Wolf ===
- On August 2, 1984, the ride was temporarily shut down after a coaster car fell from a storage track while being checked for maintenance. There were no injuries, but the front of the car had superficial damage to its fiberglass after plunging several feet to the ground.
- On May 2, 1993, a 63-year-old employee was struck in the head by the suspended roller coaster while supposedly trying to uncover a camera specifically placed to monitor a portion of the coaster's track. The man died about a day later due to his injuries.
- On March 1, 2003, a contractor hired to perform off-season painting work was killed while painting the Big Bad Wolf. The man was painting on a high-reach vehicle which overturned. James City County fire officials said the man was dead by the time they reached him.

=== Busch Gardens Railway ===
- On August 16, 2018, a fire started at the Caribou Train Station near the InvadR roller coaster and the Le Scoot Log Flume in the New France section of the park at around 3:30 p.m. An employee suffered minor injuries and was taken for medical treatment as a precaution.

=== Eagle One Monorail ===
- On August 11, 1990, a 19-year-old mother threw her four-month-old daughter onto the tracks of the park's monorail. The baby supposedly fell at least 8 feet (2.4 m). The event occurred at a monorail loading station at the Anheuser-Busch Hospitality Center. A monorail operator spotted the baby and immediately shut off the power. Although the baby had extensive injuries to her head, she was rushed to Riverside Regional Medical Center in stable condition and ultimately recovered. The mother was in an altercation with the baby's 18-year-old father when she reportedly tossed the baby over a fence and into the path of the monorail. Although the mother claimed the baby slipped out of her arms, that claim was dismissed due to the height of the fence. A source stated that the mother confessed to throwing her baby girl onto the tracks to prove to the father that it was her baby and she could do whatever she wanted to her. Both parents were charged with child endangerment.

=== Escape from Pompeii ===
- On July 21, 2018, a small fire started at the roof of the ride's attraction building at around 8:15 p.m. The ride was closed and was not operating at the time. Firefighters responded and quickly extinguished the fire. The ride re-opened a few days later.

=== Griffon ===
- On August 5, 2010, a large 14-foot-long (4.3 m) inflatable prop in the process of deflation was blown away by strong wind and collided with one of Griffon's trains, sending five guests to a local hospital with minor injuries. They were released shortly thereafter. The park stated that "The storm was too far to be dangerous", although some of the older rides that take longer to shut down were beginning to close. Griffon, however, stayed open with lightning as close as 10 miles (16 km) away.

=== Loch Ness Monster ===
- On June 13, 1989, five park guests were injured on the Loch Ness Monster roller coaster when a train collided with a tree at an estimated 15 mph (24 km/h). The tree had been blown onto the coaster's tracks by a sudden storm. The collision happened on a slightly banked right turn that follows a minor descent from the coaster's second lift hill. There were supposedly twenty-five riders in the train at the time. A 16-year-old boy suffered a broken leg, but he was later released in stable condition. Four others were treated for minor injuries. While the riders were stranded, another empty train began its usual course. The ride operators had been ordered to shut the ride down due to the storm, which required them to cycle empty trains through the ride until the last train containing passengers returned to the station. The empty train plummeted down the ride's 114-foot-long (35 m) major descent and through the upper loop of the coaster's two interlocking loops, then was stopped by the ride's safety systems at the end of the helix tunnel. The train involved in the collision was severely damaged when the front right corner of the first car was totally torn away from the rest of the train.
- On June 3, 1993, two riders claimed that the special misting water effect at the ride's tunnel entrance was caustic and temporarily blinding, causing emotional distress. A park public relations manager testified the mist only sprayed water and had been subsequently removed.

=== Pantheon ===
- On October 24, 2019, at around 8:00 a.m., the James City County Fire Department reported that a worker fell and suffered injuries while doing construction of Pantheon. The victim was airlifted and hospitalized at Sentara Norfolk General Hospital by Nightingale.

=== Roman Rapids ===
- On July 10, 1991, a 46-year-old woman hurt her knee after falling off the ride's platform into a raft.
- On July 26, 1991, a woman fractured her wrist after she slipped and fell from the ride's observation deck while trying to watch her family experience the ride. A rainstorm had just passed which required the rides and attractions to be shut down temporarily. When it later re-opened, there were no signs posted to warn all guests of the wet slippery surfaces in case of injury.

=== Tempesto ===
- On June 29, 2015, a 17-year-old girl's shoulder collar came loose during the ride. The park shut down the ride but reopened it fifteen minutes later, and stated the collar was added for guest comfort rather than safety.

== Discovery Cove ==
- On January 29, 2009, a 59-year-old man from Sale, Greater Manchester, England died after having cut his toe on coral while swimming with fish. The victim, a hemophiliac, was rushed to Wythenshawe Hospital via air ambulance, diagnosed with septic shock and organ failure, and had both legs amputated below the knee to prevent infection. The coroner ruled the death "accidental", due to group B streptococcal septicaemia.
- On August 16, 2011, three guests and five employees were injured after lightning struck inside Discovery Cove. All eight people were transported to a local hospital as a precaution. They were all released from the hospital by the next day. Park personnel had told guests to get out of the pools; the guests were sheltering at different locations inside the park when the incident happened.
- On May 28, 2024, a 13-year-old girl was found unresponsive in one of the resort's pools shortly before 11:30 a.m. EDT. The girl was rushed to a local hospital, where she died 2 days later.
- On July 8, 2024, a 51-year-old man was found unresponsive in one of the resort's pools shortly before 10:00 a.m. EDT. The man was transported to Dr. P. Phillips Hospital, where he was pronounced dead later that evening.
- On August 31, 2024, a man in his 60's was found unresponsive in one of their pools. Officials were called out to the scene around 11:10 a.m. EDT. Deputies said that the man died after being transported to a local hospital.

== SeaWorld Ohio ==
=== Baywatch Ski Show ===
- On August 17, 1996, an 18-foot-long (5.5 m) motorboat wrecked into the ski stadium audience of 4,000 people and injured 22 of them. Those injured aged from 2 to 78, and four were in critical condition. The boat was a part of the Baywatch Ski Show and crashed after a mechanical failure.

== SeaWorld San Antonio ==
=== Parking lot ===
- On June 24, 2018, a 5-year-old girl from Aubrey, Texas was killed after being run over by a white pickup truck in the SeaWorld parking lot in San Antonio. The girl and her family were leaving the park at the time around 8:00 p.m. She was in a hurry to get to their car and was separated from her parents. A driver ran her over, fatally injuring the girl at the scene.

== SeaWorld San Diego ==
=== Bayside Skyride ===
- On February 18, 2019, 16 guests were stranded on five gondolas when a strong gust of wind suddenly stopped the ride after activating its circuit breaker. It took more than four hours for all the guests to be evacuated from all the gondolas.

=== Guest altercations ===
- On October 11, 1979, a security guard shot and wounded a visitor moments after the man scuffled with guards and reportedly made a furtive move as though reaching for a weapon. The shooting was found to be justifiable.

== SeaWorld Orlando ==
=== Orcas ===
==== Tilikum ====
- On July 6, 1999, 27-year-old Daniel P. Dukes was found dead, nude in a pool and draped over the back of the orca Tilikum. Although there was media speculation of hypothermia, the autopsy report said that the cause of death was drowning and that there was trauma. The man visited SeaWorld Orlando the previous day, remained after the park closed, and evaded security to enter the orca tank. A spokesman for the sheriff's office said, "There was no obvious signs of trauma to the body. He wasn't chewed. He wasn't dismembered." However, the coroner reported finding scrapes and bruises all over the body, some of which occurred after the victim died. The coroner also discovered more significant injuries, such as puncture wounds on the victim's leg, and his scrotum having been "ripped open". Divers also found small pieces of the victim's body at the bottom of the pool.
- On February 24, 2010, 40-year-old trainer Dawn Brancheau, who had 15 years of experience at the park, died in an incident involving Tilikum. SeaWorld Orlando's head of animal training said that during a rubdown after the show, Tilikum pulled Brancheau into the water by her ponytail, and she drowned. Eyewitness trainers and audience members, however, stated that Tilikum dragged her into the water by her left forearm near the end of the show. The autopsy report said she died from drowning and traumatic injuries, including removal of her scalp and left arm. This was the third time since being first put on public display that Tilikum had been involved in a human death. By February 27, SeaWorld Orlando whale shows resumed with trainers practicing increased caution and not joining the whales in the water. SeaWorld Orlando later announced they invited experts from outside marine parks and aquariums to review their handling of killer whales and Tilikum specifically. On August 23, 2010, the Occupational Safety and Health Administration (OSHA) fined the park US$75,000 for three infractions, two directly related to the incident above. One related citation was designated as "willful" and was "committed with plain indifference to or intentional disregard for employee safety and health". The other related citation was a "serious" violation relating to a missing safety rail at Shamu Stadium. SeaWorld Orlando called OSHA's findings "unfounded". Later hearings revealed that SeaWorld Orlando had concealed a 2006 incident when another whale, Ikaika, bit a trainer. During a hearing where SeaWorld Orlando challenged OSHA's findings, former SeaWorld trainer Jeff Andrews—‌presented as an expert—‌opined that the victim died from her own mistake while near the water. He did not agree that Tilikum showed "aggressive behavior" during the incident. On May 31, 2012, an OSHA administrative law judge cited SeaWorld Orlando for two violations in the death of the trainer and fined the SeaWorld company $12,000. The final decision was issued on June 11, 2012.

=== Other incidents ===
==== Expedition Odyssey: Fire and Ice ====
- On May 1, 2025, during a preview before the official opening of the ride Expedition Odyssey: Fire and Ice, the letter "O" in the word Odyssey on the ride's entrance sign fell off and hit a female guest. The rest of the entrance sign was later removed.

== Sesame Place (Pennsylvania) ==
- On July 5, 2018, the park closed early due to a water main break that happened in Middletown Township, Bucks County, Pennsylvania leaving many businesses temporarily closed. The park reopened two days later on July 7.
- On August 9, 2020, a 17-year-old park employee was punched in the face by a man and a woman after informing them to wear a face mask per park policies enacted in response to the COVID-19 pandemic. The employee sustained jaw and tooth injuries requiring surgery and hospitalization for a week. Although the assailants fled the scene, they were identified by Middletown Township Police as being from New York. Both were charged in the assault with one subject arrested by the United States Marshals Service in New York and the second arranging to surrender to the Middletown Township Police. Those suspects had been given forever bans from all SeaWorld Parks & Entertainment facilities.
- In July 2022, Sesame Place faced criticism after an African American family claimed in an Instagram post that the character Rosita snubbed their two young children by ignoring them as they waved to her. The video went viral as other users posted similar incidents of costumed characters and black children, with those on social media calling for a boycott of the park. The park released a statement that the costume had made it difficult for the performer to see the girls. They later followed with another statement that the performer did not intentionally snub the girls, but instead rejected a request "from someone in the crowd who asked Rosita to hold their child for a photo which is not permitted." On July 19, Sesame Place Pennsylvania formally apologized to the family and invited the family back for a personal meet-and-greet with the characters. They also announced that their employees will undergo racial bias training to ensure park guests have an "inclusive, equitable and entertaining" experience.

== Water Country USA ==
=== Surfer's Bay ===
- On August 6, 1996, a 39-year-old man was shot in the back by a stray bullet while in the wave pool. He was taken to the park's first aid station then went to a local hospital for treatment and recovered from his injury.

== See also ==
- Blackfish
- Amusement park accidents
