= Volcano: The Blast Coaster =

Defunct roller coaster at Kings Dominion

- Volcano: The Blast Coaster in July 2001

Kings Dominion
- Location: Kings Dominion
- Park section: Safari Village
- Coordinates: 37°50′21.7″N 77°26′24.6″W
- Status: Removed
- Soft opening date: August 1, 1998
- Opening date: August 3, 1998
- Closing date: 2018
- Cost: $20 million
- Replaced: Smurf Mountain
- Replaced by: Rapterra

General statistics
- Type: Steel – Inverted – Launched
- Manufacturer: Intamin
- Designer: Werner Stengel
- Model: Suspended Catapult Coaster
- Lift/launch system: LIM Launch
- Height: 155 ft (47 m)
- Drop: 80 ft (24 m)
- Length: 2,757 ft (840 m)
- Speed: 70 mph (110 km/h)
- Inversions: 4
- Height restriction: 54–78 in (137–198 cm)
- Trains: 3 trains with 4 cars; riders arranged 2 across in 2 rows for a total of 16 riders per train
- Fast Lane was available
- Volcano: The Blast Coaster at RCDB

Volcano: The Blast Coaster, or simply Volcano, was an inverted launched roller coaster located at Kings Dominion in Doswell, Virginia, United States. Designed by Werner Stengel, it was the first launched roller coaster manufactured by Intamin and the first of its kind in the world to be inverted. Its launch mechanism utilized linear induction motor (LIM) technology. After a series of delays, Volcano opened to the public on August 3, 1998. A portion of the ride was enclosed inside an artificial mountain, constructed in 1979, which previously housed other attractions. Following nearly two decades of operation, Volcano closed a few weeks into the 2018 season, and the closure became permanent during the following offseason. In 2024, Rapterra, a launched wing coaster, was announced to replace Volcano.

== History ==
An artificial mountain, originally called The Lost World, was constructed at Kings Dominion in 1979. It was located in the Safari Village section of the park and featured three rides inside – a dark ride named Land of the Dooz, a flume ride named Voyage to Atlantis, and a Rotor flat ride from Chance Rides named Time Shaft. Voyage to Atlantis was renamed Haunted River for the 1980 season. In 1984, Land of the Dooz was refurbished and rethemed to The Smurfs franchise, becoming known as Smurf Mountain. As popularity declined over the years, Smurf Mountain eventually closed permanently in 1993. The other two attractions were closed after the 1994 season, and the mountain's entrance was sealed off, casting uncertainty on the enclosed area's future.

Kings Dominion was acquired by Paramount Parks in 1993, and under new ownership, plans were made to renovate the mountain. They considered adding a new attraction based on the upcoming 1995 Paramount film Congo. The theme was later abandoned due to the film's poor box office performance. In 1996, the park moved in another direction hiring Intamin to design a new roller coaster. The ride manufacturer set out to develop a launch coaster, the company's first, that would be powered by a linear induction motor (LIM). Another ride manufacturer, Premier Rides, had pioneered the concept two years earlier with the design of Flight of Fear at Kings Island. A second concept for the theme was then proposed; the story focused on calling guests Lava Chasers, who were on a quest to explore the remnants of an ancient city inside a volcano. Although the early ride design from this concept was not used, much of the proposed theme was retained. Intamin came up with two launched models: an Impulse Coaster (shuttle) and a Suspended Catapult Coaster (complete-circuit). An early track design proposed by Intamin, much of which was later modified, featured a maximum speed of 75 mph (121 km/h), a 140-foot (43 m) Immelmann inversion with a 130-foot (40 m) drop, a horseshoe, two double heartline rolls, and a helix.

On July 22, 1997, Kings Dominion unveiled the name of the new ride, Volcano: The Blast Coaster, along with several ride specifications in a press release announcement. At a cost of $20 million, the new ride would become the first launched roller coaster in the world to be inverted. Upon completion, Volcano would also become the park's tenth roller coaster and Kings Dominion began marketing its collection of coasters as the largest on the East Coast. Intamin based the prototype design on their Suspended Catapult Coaster model. In order to begin construction, several holes had to be sliced into the mountain to begin the process of gutting the interior. The two attractions remaining inside – Haunted River and Time Shaft – were completely removed along with the remains of Smurf Mountain that had been idle for several years. Some of the biggest challenges included the installation of the coaster's climax, a 155-foot-tall (47 m) roll out inversion where the track exits the structure, and the mountain's peak itself, which had to be modified into a wide opening that resembled a volcano.

The new coaster was plagued with a variety of technical issues long before it opened. At the time, LIM technology was still fairly new to the industry and Intamin's system was initially buggy. Kings Dominion understood the challenge, having faced similar obstacles with the nearby Flight of Fear. Originally, Volcano only featured one LIM launch at the beginning of the ride. The trains failed to exit the volcano consistently during early testing, often rolling back down to the launch area in what is typically referred to as a rollback. Although Volcano's design accounted for rollbacks and allowed them to occur safely, the frequency of the problem led to multiple delays of the ride's grand opening. After several months of postponing, a soft opening was eventually held on August 1, 1998. Volcano: The Blast Coaster officially opened to the public two days later on August 3, 1998. During its first year of operation, the park opted to run the trains at half capacity as a temporary solution, reducing the weight and the number of rollbacks. For the 1999 season, a second set of LIMs were added further along the launch track. This supplied the added boost needed to crest the 155-foot (47 m) roll out inversion on a consistent basis.

In addition to being the first of its kind to use an LIM launch system, Volcano opened as the fastest inverted roller coaster in the world, reaching a maximum speed of 70 mph (110 km/h). The previous record holder, Alpengeist at the nearby Busch Gardens Williamsburg, featured a top speed of 67 mph (108 km/h) and opened a year earlier in 1997. Volcano featured a roll out at 155 feet (47 m), making it the tallest inversion on any roller coaster.

=== Modifications and closure ===
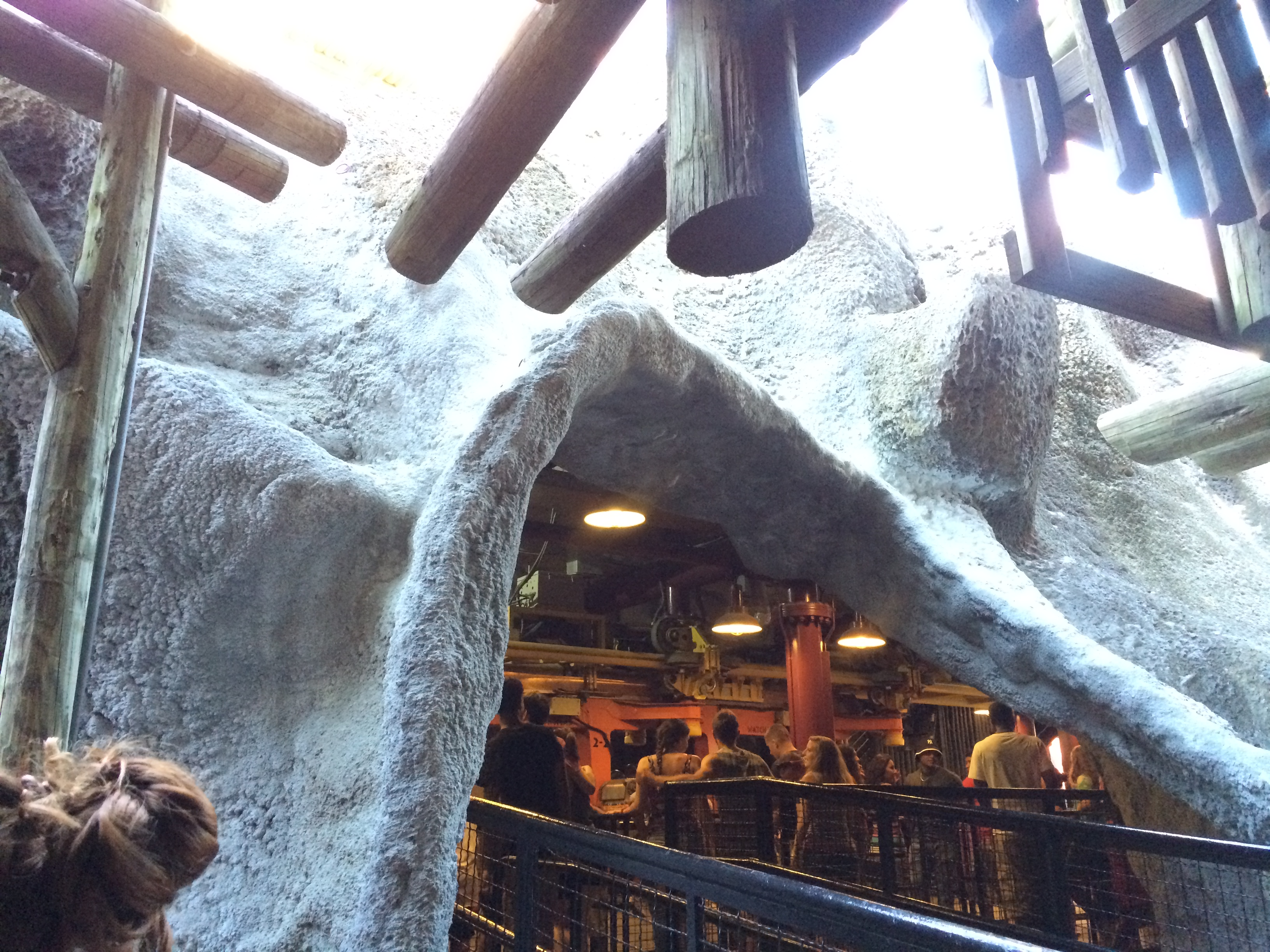
The station following 2014 modifications

In 2014, the queue line was upgraded with a new loading station to help increase the riders per hour. Guests would now climb down the former Fast Lane entrance staircase to access the new station. The new Fast Lane entrance was located in the Expedition Gear gift shop, where guests exited the ride. Several wooden logs were attached to a black gate in the switchback area to separate the entrance and exit paths. This area received some new television screens as well. Plus, the unloading side of the station had fake rockwork.

During the 2018 season, Volcano operated for the first few weeks before closing. It remained closed for the rest of the season. Nearly a year later on February 8, 2019, Kings Dominion quietly announced intentions to remove Volcano from the park, citing issues with reliability, rider capacity, and overall customer satisfaction. By May of the same year, the entire attraction was demolished, including the volcano structure. A section of track, a ride vehicle, and signage from the retired attraction were later donated to the National Roller Coaster Museum in Plainview, Texas.

== Ride experience ==
Volcano's layout simulated the path of a volcanic eruption. Upon boarding one of three trains at the base of the mountain, riders made a slow turn left out of the station. The train then moved into its first of two launch tracks, which accelerated the train to 70 miles per hour (110 km/h). During the first launch, the on-ride camera took photos of the riders. After making a sweeping 200-degree left turn behind the mountain, the train entered the second launch tunnel, followed by a vertical section ending in a "roll out" element as the train exited the top of the mountain. The "roll out", similar to a sidewinder, was a vertical section of track followed by a quarter loop to bring the train completely upside down, then a loose half-corkscrew. According to Roller Coaster DataBase, the roll out element was unique to Volcano.

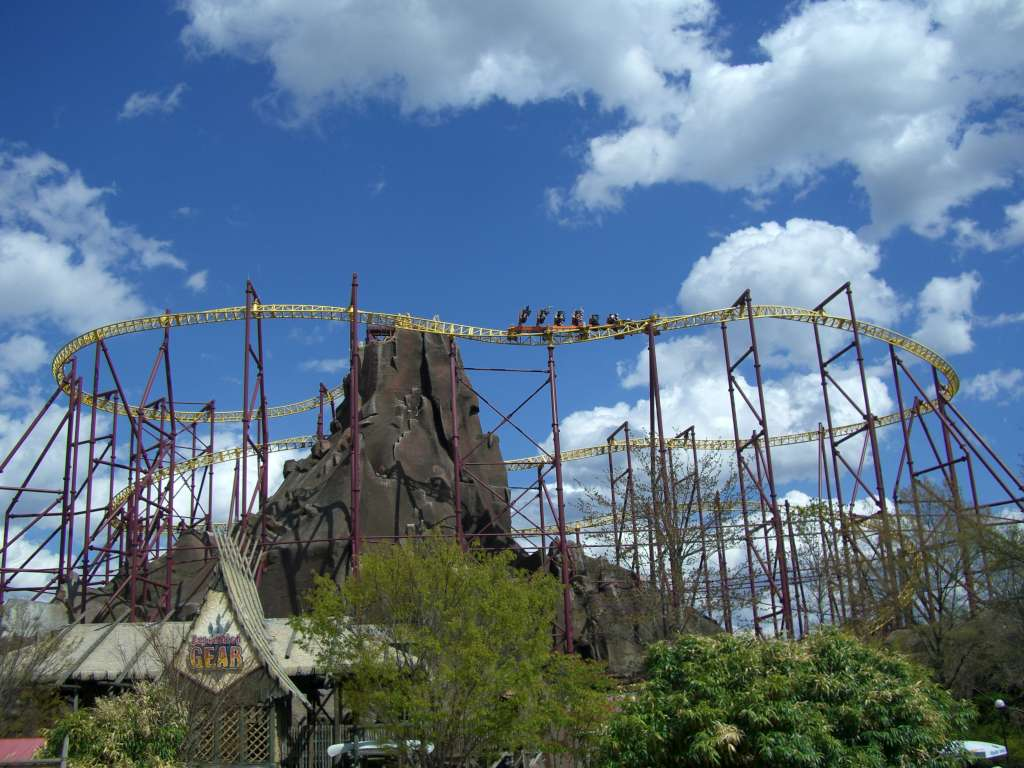
Volcano in action

The highest point of the roll out was 155 feet (47 m) above ground level, making it the highest inversion at Kings Dominion, taller than Dominator's 135-foot (41 m) vertical loop. After the roll out, the train made a sweeping left turn around the mountain followed by a heartline roll in midair. The train made another turnaround and passed through a second heartline roll, which was embedded into the side of the mountain. After another turnaround and a third heartline roll, the train made a turning 80-foot (24 m) drop into the final brake run. After a left turn, the train returned to the station.

== Incidents ==
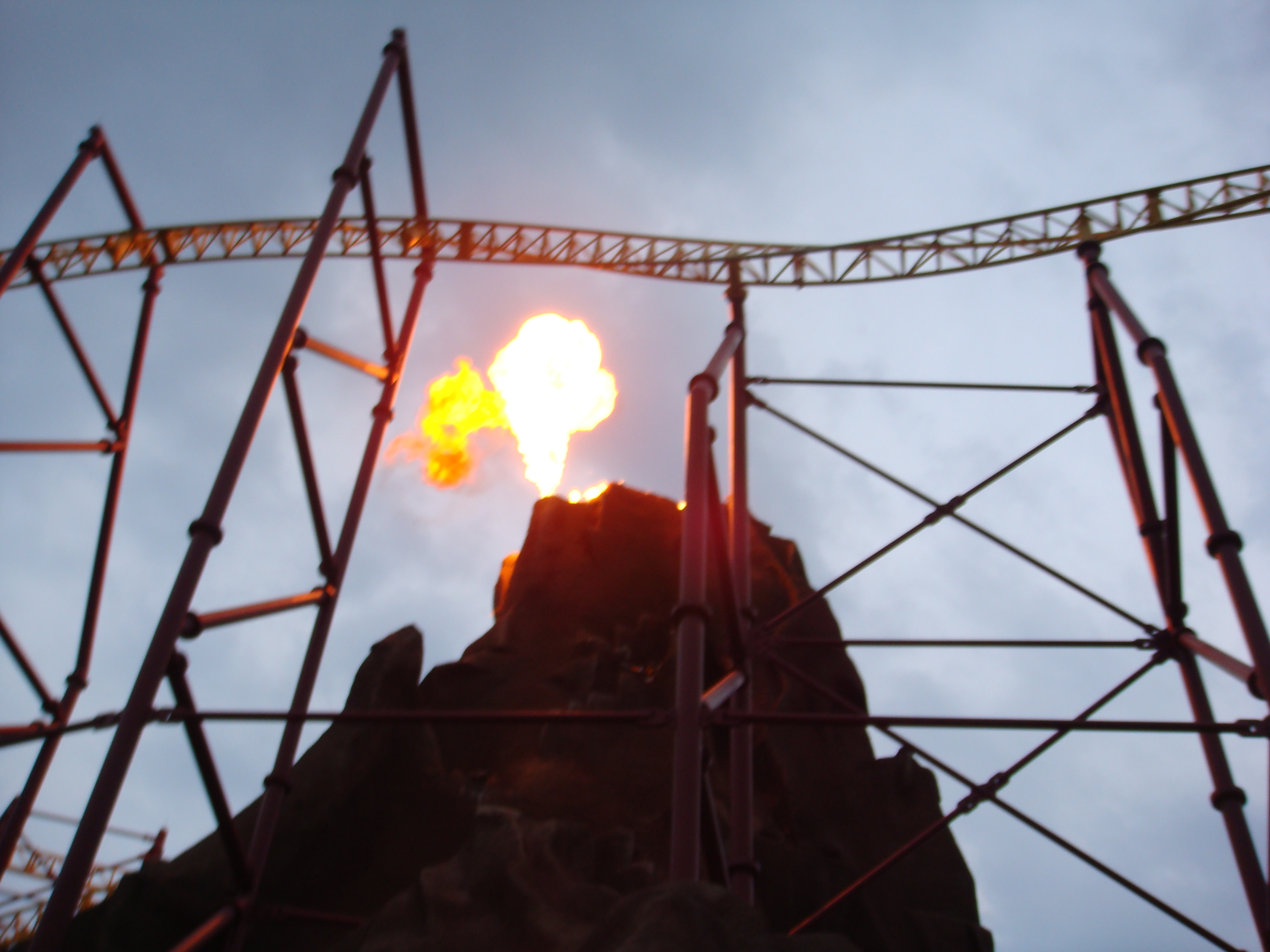
The fire effects

On June 23, 2006, the roller coaster experienced a launch failure when a train carrying 15 passengers stalled and rolled back slightly. Some were stranded for more than two hours. One rider reported hearing a loud pop and getting hit in the chin with flying debris.

== Records ==
When it opened in 1998, Volcano: The Blast Coaster set a world record for having the highest inversion on a roller coaster at 155 feet (47 m). The record was held until GateKeeper opened at Cedar Point in 2013, featuring an inversion at a height of 170 feet (52 m). Volcano also opened as the fastest inverted coaster in the world, reaching a maximum speed of 70 mph (110 km/h). The speed was matched by Superman: Ultimate Escape at Geauga Lake in 2000 and also by The Flash: Vertical Velocity at Six Flags Great America in 2001. Wicked Twister broke the record when it opened at Cedar Point in 2002, featuring a top speed of 72 mph (116 km/h).

== Rankings ==
Golden Ticket Awards: Top steel Roller Coasters
Year									1998	1999
Ranking									–	–
Year	2000	2001	2002	2003	2004	2005	2006	2007	2008	2009
Ranking	–	25	28	28	23	23	25	28	33	41
Year	2010	2011	2012	2013	2014	2015	2016	2017	2018	2019
Ranking	35	29 (tie)	40	39	49 (tie)	–	–	–	–	–
Year	2020	2021	2022	2023	2024	2025	2026			
Ranking	N/A	–	–	–	–	–	–			

Preceded by Alpengeist	World's fastest inverted roller coaster August 1998–May 2002	Succeeded by Wicked Twister
