= Alpengeist =

Roller coaster

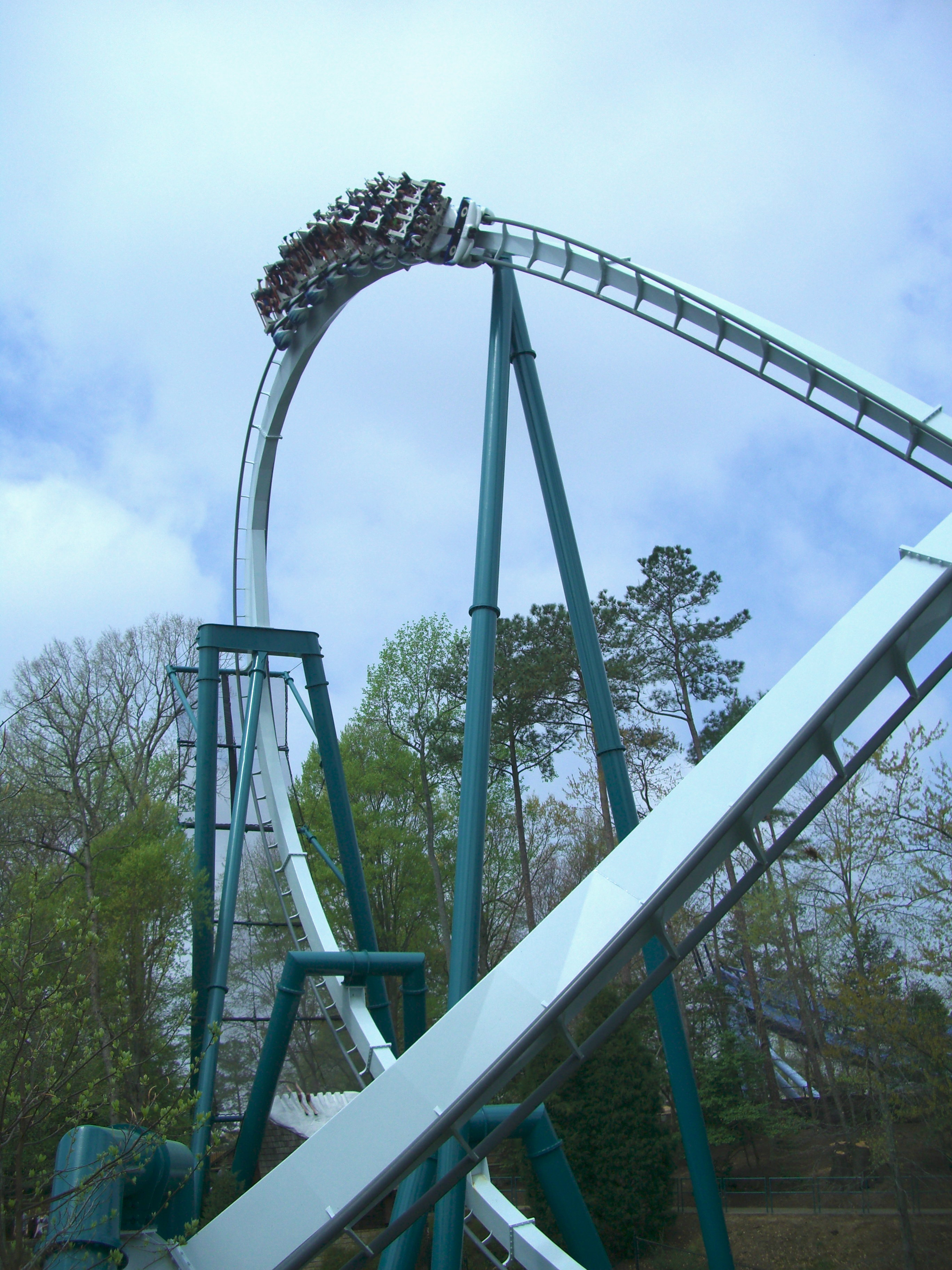
- Alpengeist's Immelmann

Busch Gardens Williamsburg
- Location: Busch Gardens Williamsburg
- Park section: Rhinefeld
- Coordinates: 37.2328°N 76.6476°W
- Status: Operating
- Opening date: March 22, 1997
- Cost: $20 million

General statistics
- Type: Steel – Inverted
- Manufacturer: Bolliger & Mabillard
- Designer: Werner Stengel
- Model: Inverted Coaster
- Track layout: Terrain
- Lift/launch system: Chain lift hill
- Height: 195 ft (59 m)
- Drop: 170 ft (52 m)
- Length: 3,828 ft (1,167 m)
- Speed: 67 mph (108 km/h)
- Inversions: 6
- Duration: 3:10
- Max vertical angle: 79°
- Capacity: 1820 riders per hour
- G-force: 4.5
- Height restriction: 54 in (137 cm)
- Trains: 3 (max. 2 in operation) trains with 8 cars. Riders are arranged 4 across in a single row, with no seats in the first car, for a total of 32 riders per train.
- Quick Queue available
- Alpengeist at RCDB

Alpengeist /ˈælpənˈɡaɪst/ is an inverted roller coaster at Busch Gardens Williamsburg in Williamsburg, Virginia. Manufactured by Bolliger & Mabillard, Alpengeist has an Alpine mountain region theme and opened in 1997 as the tallest inverted coaster in the world. The name "Alpengeist" is German for "Alpine Ghost" and the ride is themed to a runaway ski lift. It holds the records for the tallest complete-circuit inverted coaster in the world, tallest inverted roller coaster in the United States, and the longest inverted-complete-circuit coaster drop in the world.

== History ==
On August 30, 1996, Busch Gardens Williamsburg announced the addition of Alpengeist for the 1997 season. It would break the height and speed records among inverted roller coasters and feature the tallest vertical loop on an inverted coaster. The ride would be the park's second new roller coaster in two years after Izzy (later renamed Wild Maus). To reduce noise, the coaster would use polyurethane wheels instead of nylon, and the drop would be angled away from houses in Kingsmill. Part of the coaster would also be constructed in a ravine.

Construction of Alpengeist began two months before the announcement in June 1996. The coaster would be made out of 106 track pieces, with 7 for the lift hill, 10 for the station, and 89 for the rest of the layout.

Alpengeist officially opened on March 22, 1997. It held the record for tallest inverted coaster until the opening of Cedar Point's Wicked Twister in 2002. However, Alpengeist remained the world's tallest among complete-circuit inverted coasters. In 2021, it was surpassed again by Legendary Twin Dragon, an inverted shuttle coaster in China. Wicked Twister closed at the end of the 2021 season making Alpengeist the tallest inverted coaster in North America. Additionally, Alpengeist would hold the record for being the fastest inverted coaster until Volcano: The Blast Coaster at nearby Kings Dominion surpassed it in 1998.

In 2022, Alpengeist was repainted with light blue supports.

== Characteristics ==
The ride features three trains, though only two are in use at any time. Three mechanics maintain the ride and spend four months each year completely reconstructing each of the trains. Each train contains eight cars, each equipped with a single row seating four riders for a total of 32 riders per train. The trains feature a zero car at the front of the train which contains 1,499 lb (680 kg) of weight. This allows the trains to complete larger elements. The trains also feature skis on the side of each seat support beam which adds to the theming of the ride. The trains' wheel protectors are also painted to resemble ski helmets, each having a unique design.It also is approximately 190 feet and is the tallest in the world

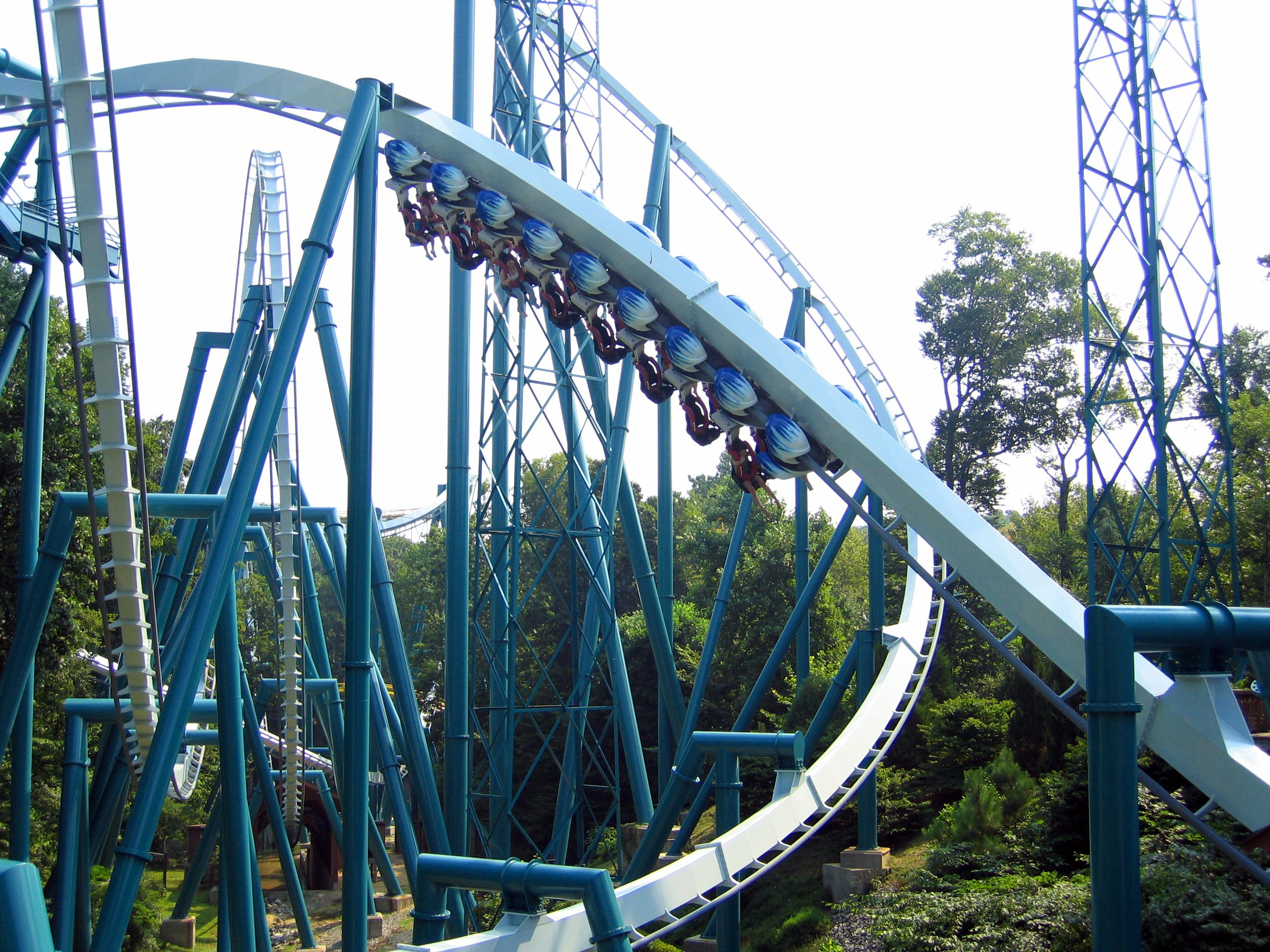
View of Alpengeist's trains, showing the ski helmet wheel protectors as well as the zero car

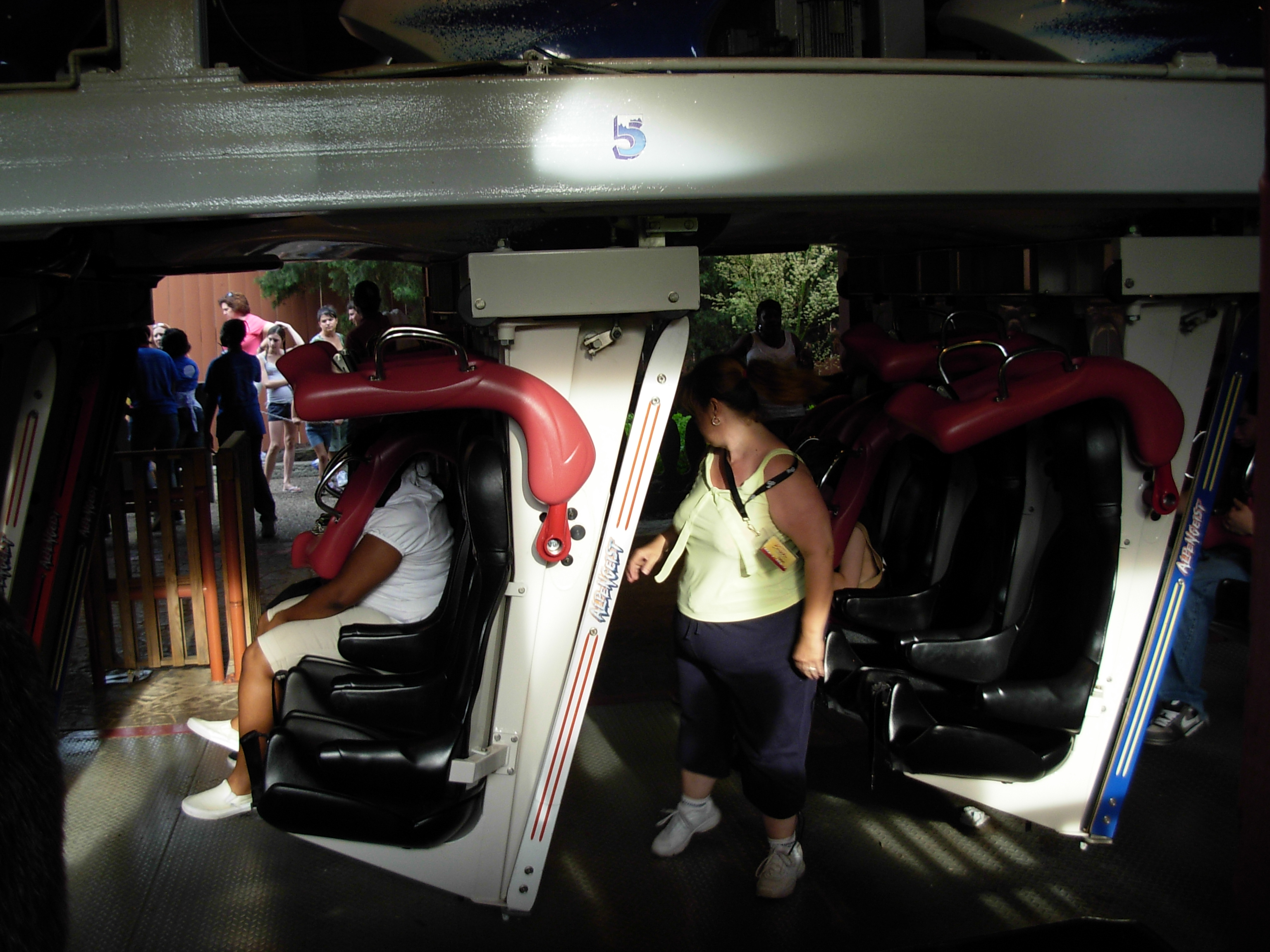
Alpengeist train loading at station, showing the skis on the cars

== Ride experience ==
Upon exiting the station, the floor drops beneath the riders' feet and the train climbs the 167-foot-tall (51 m) chain lift after hearing the send-off recording "Thank you and enjoy your avalanche of adventure on Alpengeist!" The top of the lift reaches 195 ft (59 m) above the river below. The track turns right while dropping down a 170 ft (52 m) spiral drop, going past The Land of The Dragons, with the train hitting 67 mph (108 km/h). Following the drop, the train passes through a 120 ft (37 m) Immelmann loop, followed by a 106 ft (32 m) vertical loop. The track then races through a wooden tunnel before passing through a cobra roll over the Rhine River, adjacent to the Loch Ness Monster. Out of the cobra roll, the track crosses over the entrance to the cobra roll, passes by Griffon, then rises into the midcourse brake run. After the midcourse brakes, the track crosses over the exit from the Immelmann loop and then into another tunnel and down a drop before entering a zero-g roll, alongside the Le Scoot log flume. After a short section of straight track close to ground level, the track inverts into a corkscrew followed by a clockwise upward helix, before making a left turn to the final brake run.

== Awards ==
Golden Ticket Awards: Top steel Roller Coasters
Year									1998	1999
Ranking									2	3
Year	2000	2001	2002	2003	2004	2005	2006	2007	2008	2009
Ranking	8	10	13	19	19	17	17	18	22	19
Year	2010	2011	2012	2013	2014	2015	2016	2017	2018	2019
Ranking	23	27	24	25	23	26	30	36	32	32
Year	2020	2021	2022	2023	2024	2025	2026			
Ranking	N/A	21	36	48	41	–	46			

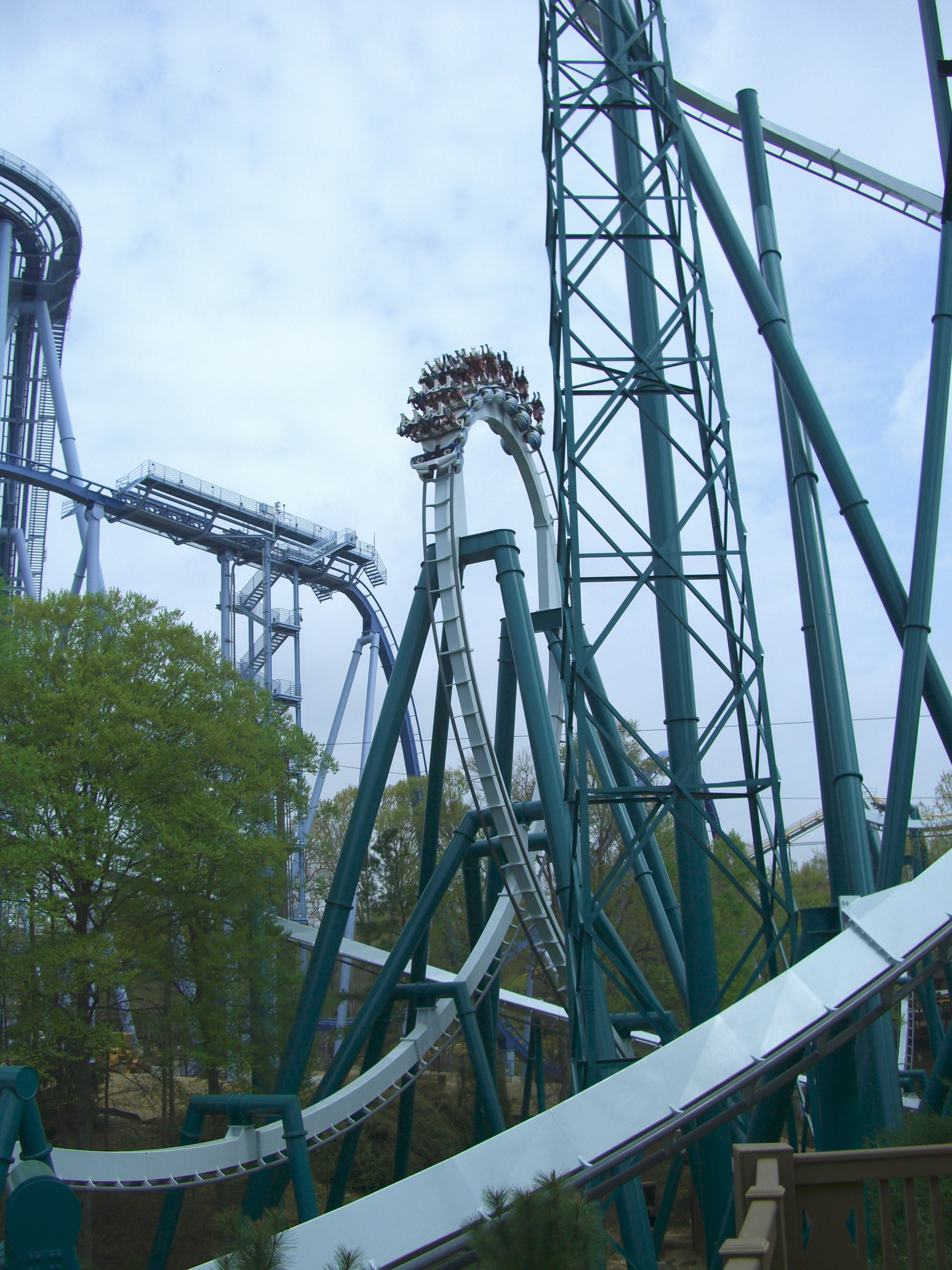
Alpengeist's loop

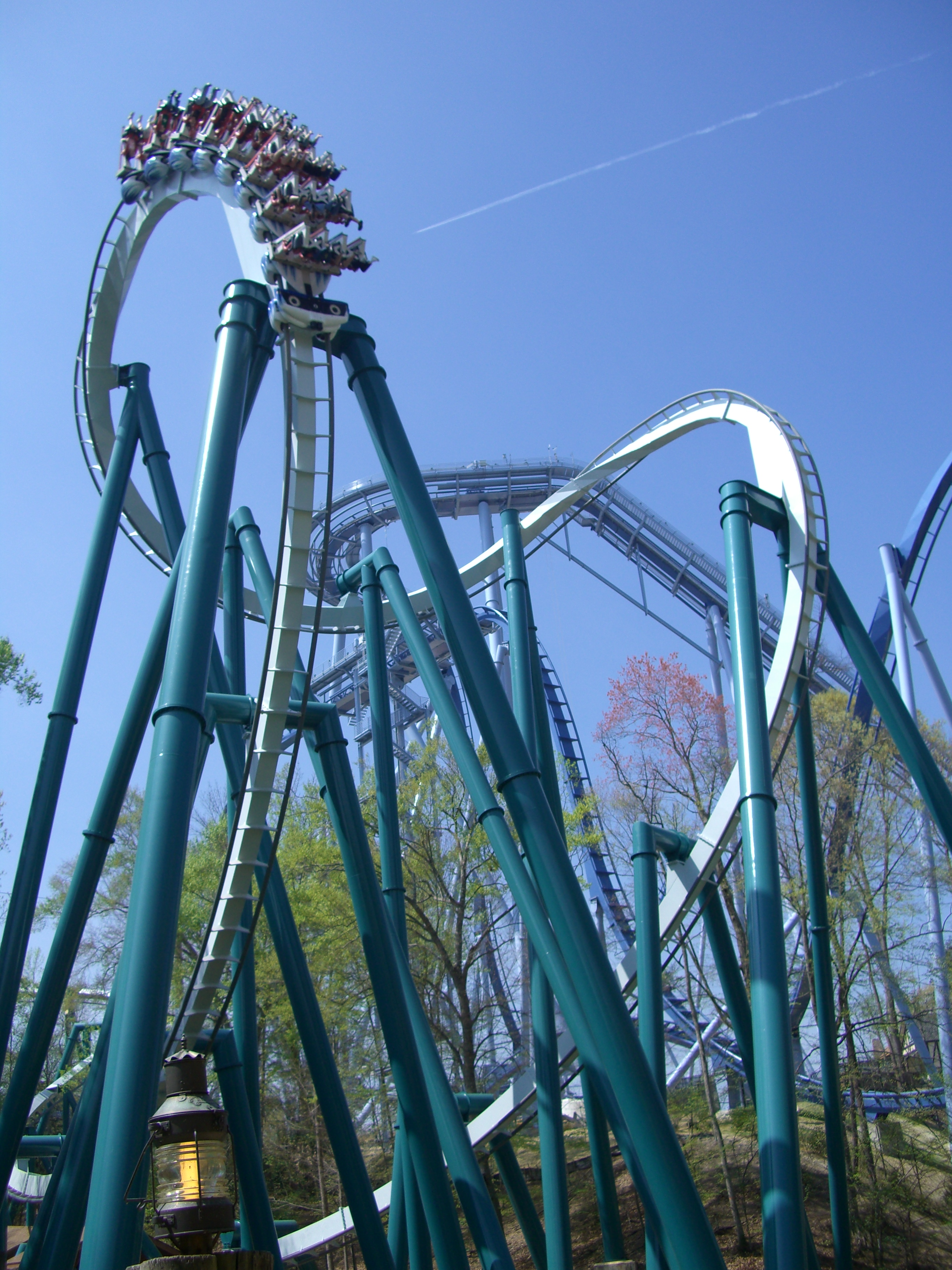
Alpengeist's cobra roll

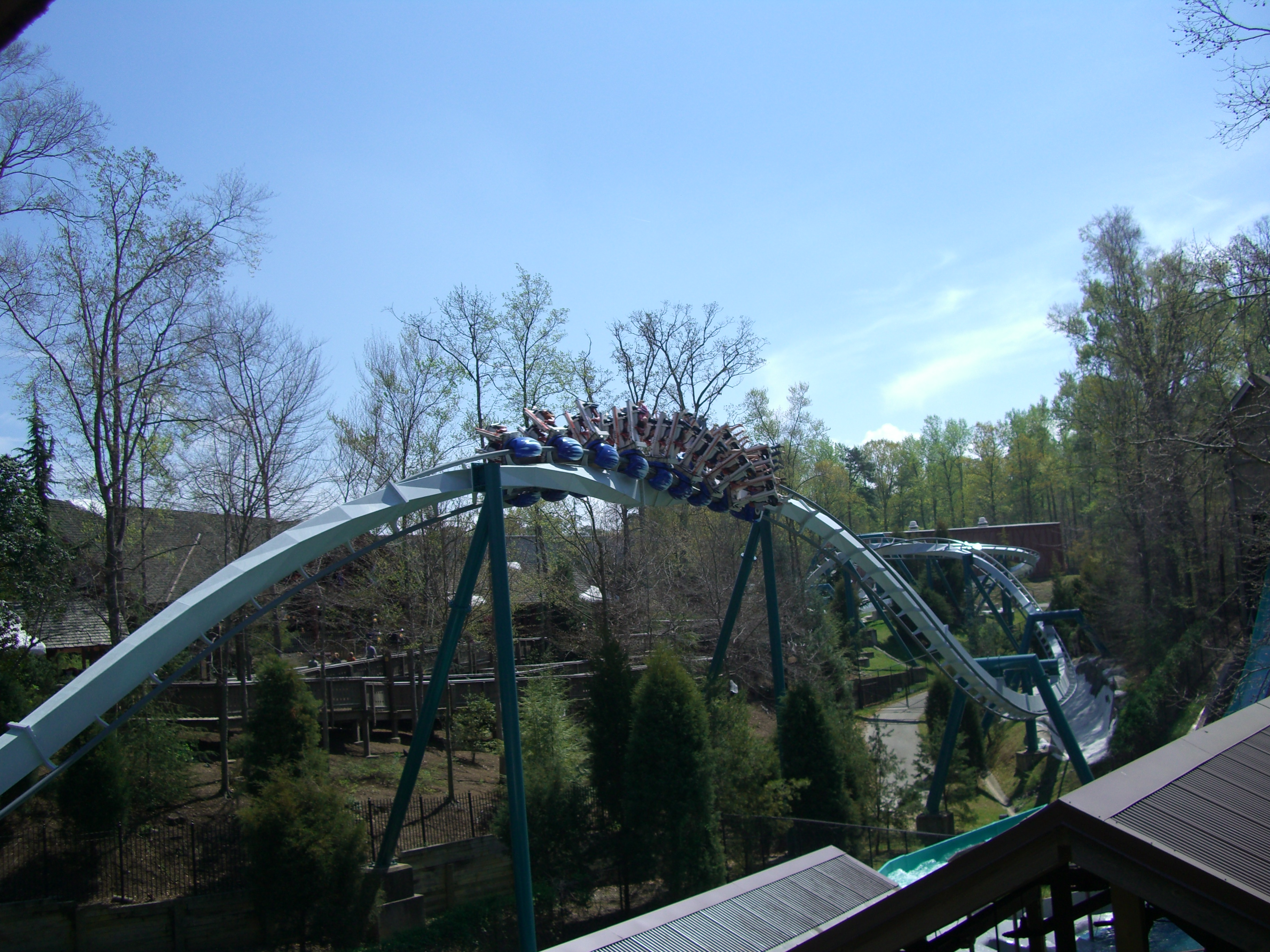
Alpengeist's zero-g roll

Preceded by Montu	World's tallest inverted roller coaster March 1997–May 2002	Succeeded by Wicked Twister
Preceded by Montu	World's fastest inverted roller coaster March 1997–August 1998	Succeeded by Volcano, The Blast Coaster
