= Raptor (Cedar Point) =

Inverted roller coaster in Ohio, US

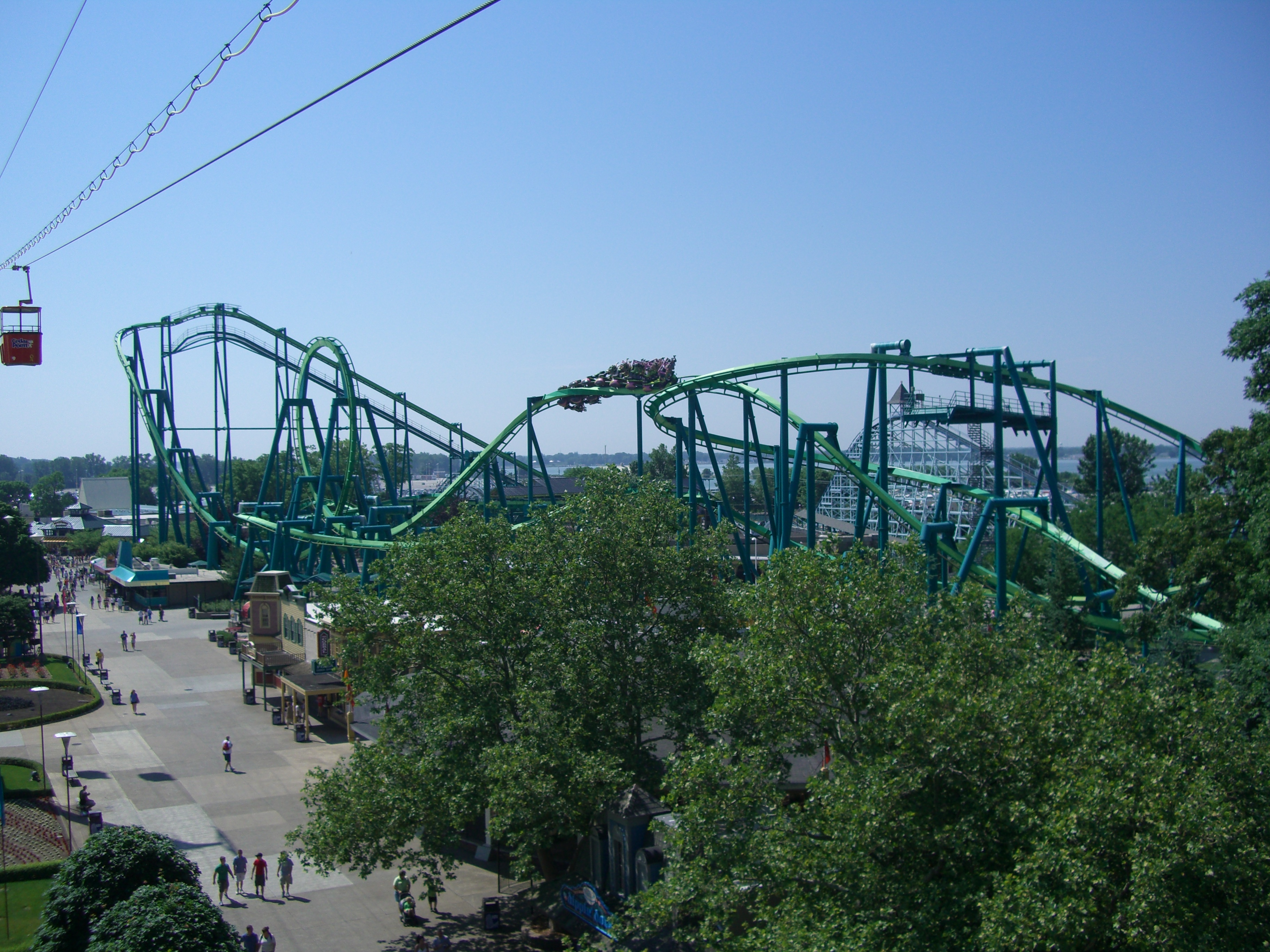
- View of Raptor from Sky Ride

Cedar Point
- Location: Cedar Point
- Park section: Main Midway
- Coordinates: 41°28′44.50″N 82°40′54.50″W
- Status: Operating
- Soft opening date: May 6, 1994
- Opening date: May 7, 1994
- Cost: $11.5 - $12 million
- Replaced: Mill Race

General statistics
- Type: Steel – Inverted
- Manufacturer: Bolliger & Mabillard
- Designer: Werner Stengel
- Model: Inverted Coaster - Raptor
- Lift/launch system: Chain lift hill
- Height: 137 ft (42 m)
- Drop: 119 ft (36 m)
- Length: 3,790 ft (1,160 m)
- Speed: 57 mph (92 km/h)
- Inversions: 6
- Duration: 2:16
- Max vertical angle: 45°
- Capacity: 1,600 riders per hour
- Height restriction: 54 in (137 cm)
- Trains: 3 trains with 8 cars; riders arranged 4 across in a single row for a total of 32 riders per train
- Fast Lane available
- Raptor at RCDB

Raptor is an inverted roller coaster designed by Bolliger & Mabillard at Cedar Point in Sandusky, Ohio, United States. The coaster, which broke many records upon its opening in 1994, differs from previous inverted coasters. Instead of having a short layout designed to fit into a compact area like Batman: The Ride, Raptor was designed with a larger, 3,790-foot (1,160 m) layout, making it the tallest, fastest and longest inverted roller coaster in the world when it opened. It features six inversions, including a cobra roll, a first for inverted roller coasters. The ride is themed as a bird of prey.

== History ==
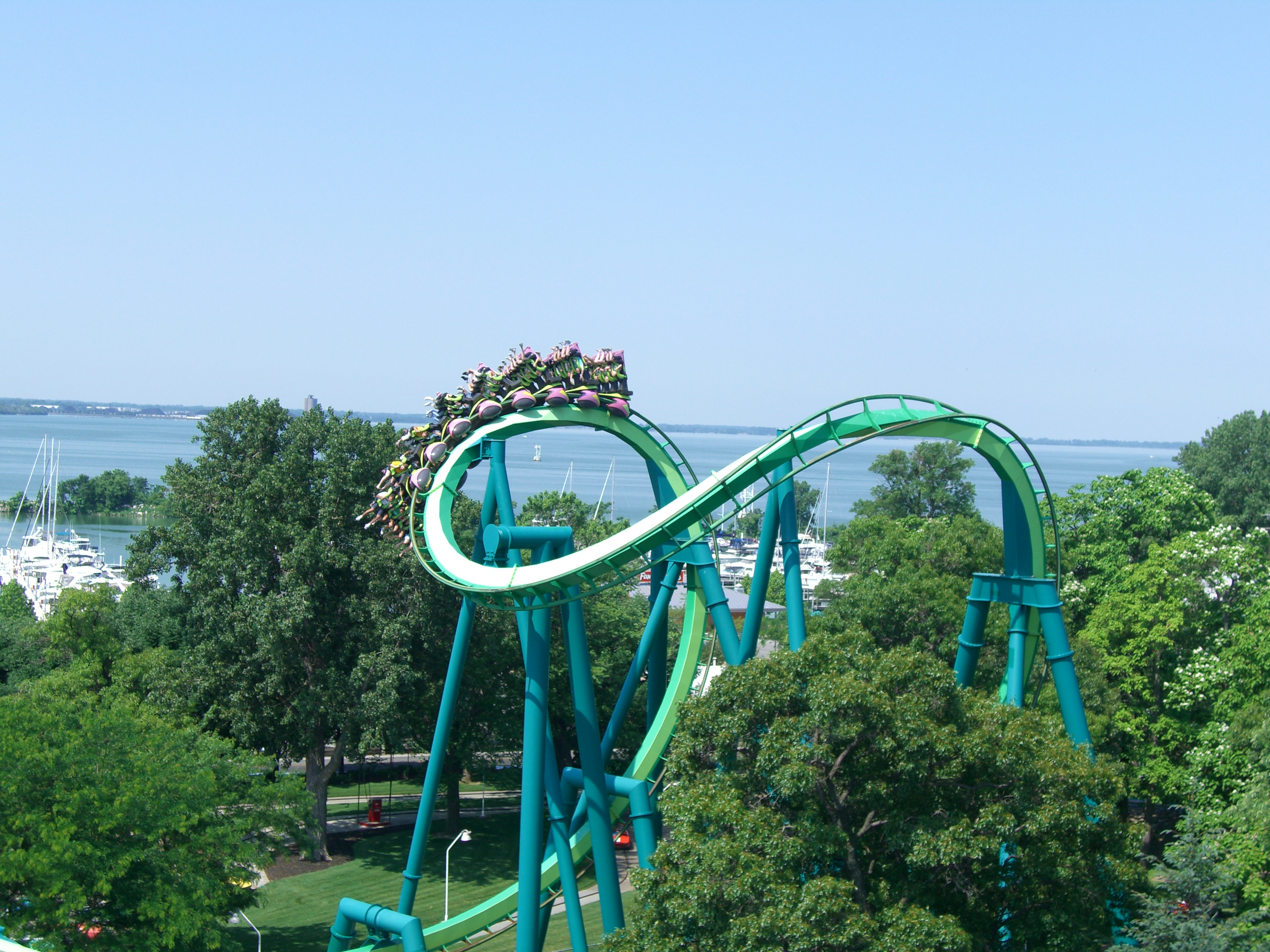
Raptor's cobra roll, a first for inverted coasters

On August 19, 1993, Cedar Fair Entertainment Company filed a trademark for the name Raptor. Raptor was then announced on September 1, 1993 during a press conference. Regarding the design of the attraction, Cedar Point management said: "Raptor will be the most exciting and ambitious project ever ... a project that will challenge the boundaries of imagination and change the Sandusky, Ohio amusement park/resort like nothing before it."

Construction started after the 1993 season with the site clearing of the Mill Race log flume water ride. The Midway Carousel and Calypso were relocated in October to other areas of the park to make room for Raptor. Footers also began to be poured that month. The lift hill was topped off in December with track construction continuing through January 1994. The first trains were tested about two months later in March. Final preparations were made in March with the entrance plaza being built and 85,000 square feet (7,900 m^{2}) of midway replaced. Media day was held on May 6 before the ride opened to the public the next day for the first time. The ride was originally painted with dark green supports, bright green track and unpainted rails. It was repainted for the 2002 season and the rails were painted dark green, matching the supports. It was repainted again before the start of the 2016 season.

== Ride experience ==
Raptor is located on three acres (1.2 ha) at the front of the park near Blue Streak. The ride travels over the pathway to Blue Streak then passes by the Cadillac Cars and Cedar Downs Racing Derby.

=== Layout ===
The ride begins with a left-hand turn out of the station to the lift hill that ascends 137 feet (42 m). Riders are pulled up by a 9,000 lb (40 kN) chain lift. At the top, the train dips slightly into the pre-drop before turning 90 degrees to the left as it drops 119 feet (36 m) down the first hill. From the bottom the train immediately enters a 100 foot (30 m) vertical loop. The train then enters a zero-g roll followed by the cobra roll, a first for inverted roller coasters, which inverts riders twice.

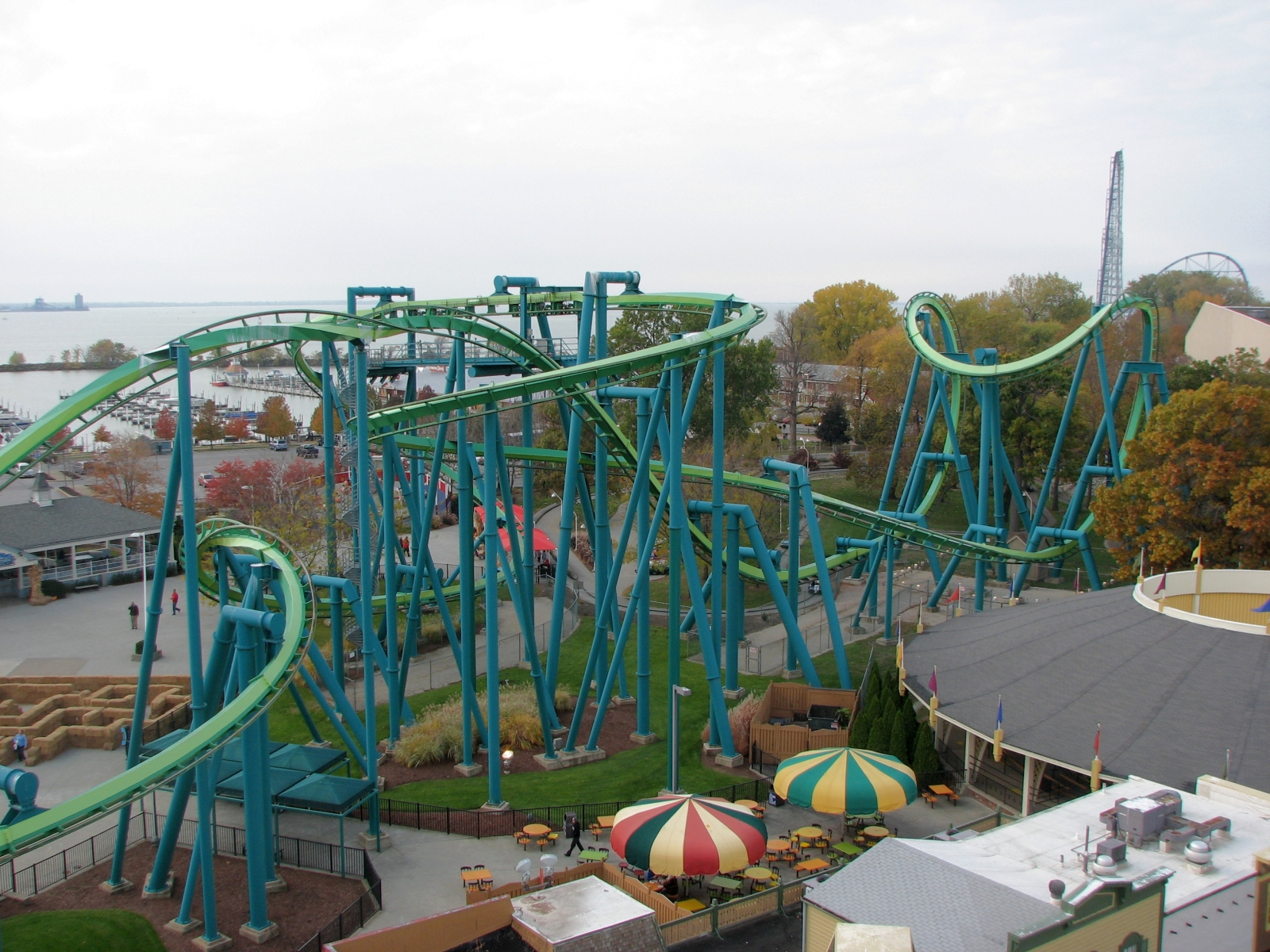
View of Raptor's mid-course layout

After the cobra roll, the train makes a slight right turn followed by an upward left-hand helix and enters the mid-course brake run. Next, the train dives down to the right transitioning into a brief straight section of track. Riders then enter the first of two flat spins which rotates the train 360 degrees to the left. The track straightens briefly again before turning to the right and entering a short dip before taking riders into the second flat spin. The ride finishes with a 1.5 revolution flat helix where riders encounter strong positive G-forces before making one last left turn into the final brake run and back into the station. One cycle of the ride lasts about 2 minutes and 16 seconds.

=== Track ===
The steel track is approximately 3,790 feet (1,160 m) in length and the height of the lift is approximately 137 feet (42 m). The first drop is 119 feet (36 m). When the coaster first opened, it was painted with dark green supports, bright green track and unpainted rails. 1,500 gallons of paint were used to originally paint it. Raptor was repainted for the 2002 season and the rails were painted dark green, matching the supports. Most of the 117 sections of track were manufactured by Clermont Steel Fabricators in Batavia, Ohio. The roller coaster was repainted again for the 2016 season with its original colors.

=== Trains ===
Raptor operates with three steel and fiberglass trains. Each train has eight cars that have four seats in a single row for a total of 32 riders in Ski lift like trains. Riders are secured by an over the shoulder restraint with a locking belt. The trains were manufactured in Switzerland at Bolliger & Mabillard's headquarters.

== Operation ==
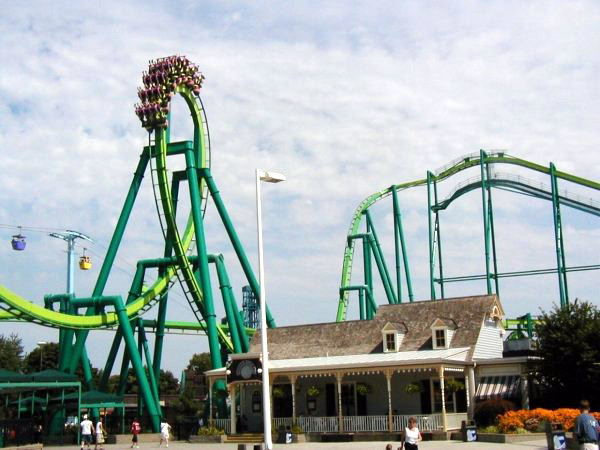
Raptor's lift hill and loop

Raptor is adversely affected by unfavorable weather conditions as both a high altitude and high velocity ride. "Rain, high winds, and/or lightning" may result in the closing of the ride depending on the severity. It closes in high winds and any type of precipitation.

There is no minimum age requirement, but passengers must meet the minimum height requirement of 54 inches (1.37 m) to ride. Some persons over a certain weight/waist size are not permitted to ride if the seat and lap bar harness cannot accommodate them. Passengers on Raptor may not bring any loose articles onto the train and are required to wear shirts and footwear. Headphones must be removed before boarding.

Passengers are advised that they must not ride Raptor if they have "a history of recent surgery, heart trouble/high blood pressure, neck trouble, back trouble, or any other condition that may be aggravated by riding, or who are pregnant".

== Incidents ==
On July 6, 2009, a guest complained of feeling faint after the ride. Raptor was immediately shut down as the guest was transported to a local hospital. The ride remained closed for the remainder of the day, reopening the next afternoon after a thorough inspection was completed. The guest was later released from the hospital.

On June 21, 2015, a 37-year-old man's leg was gashed by the ride's loading platform gates. He was taken to a local hospital where his wound was sutured.

On August 13, 2015, a 45-year-old man was struck by a moving train after entering the ride's restricted area to retrieve a cell phone he lost while riding. He was pronounced dead on scene shortly after paramedics' arrival. The ride was immediately closed for inspection and reopened the next day.

== Awards ==
Amusement Today magazine's Golden Ticket Awards ranked Raptor among the top 50 steel coasters in the world every year from 1998 to 2014.

Golden Ticket Awards: Top steel Roller Coasters
Year									1998	1999
Ranking									6	6
Year	2000	2001	2002	2003	2004	2005	2006	2007	2008	2009
Ranking	5	8	12	10	10	11	14	19	22 (tie)	22
Year	2010	2011	2012	2013	2014	2015	2016	2017	2018	2019
Ranking	24 (tie)	18	31	30	47	–	47	–	–	–
Year	2020	2021	2022	2023	2024	2025	2026			
Ranking	N/A	48 (tie)	–	–	–	–	–			

Preceded by Batman: The Ride	World's tallest inverted roller coaster May 1994–May 1996	Succeeded by Montu
Preceded by Nemesis	World's fastest inverted roller coaster May 1994–May 1996	Succeeded by Montu
Preceded by Batman: The Ride	World's longest inverted roller coaster May 1994–May 1996	Succeeded by Montu
