= Pyrenees (roller coaster) =

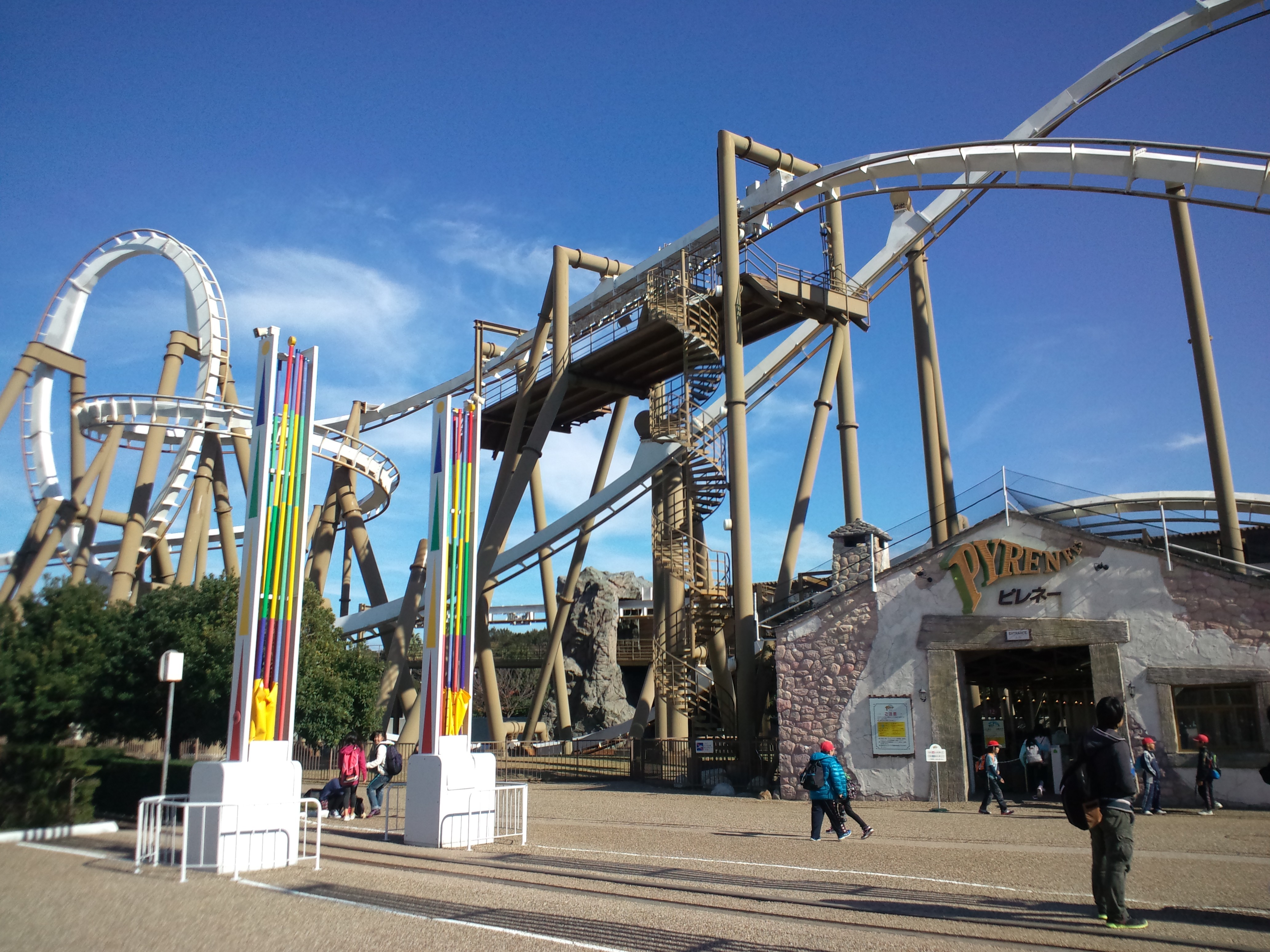

Shima Spain Village
- Location: Shima Spain Village
- Coordinates: 34°21′35″N 136°50′42″E
- Status: Operating
- Opening date: 1997

General statistics
- Type: Steel – Inverted
- Manufacturer: Bolliger & Mabillard
- Designer: Werner Stengel
- Model: Inverted Coaster
- Track layout: Custom
- Lift/launch system: Chain lift hill
- Height: 45 m (148 ft)
- Length: 1,234 m (4,049 ft)
- Speed: 100 km/h (62 mph)
- Inversions: 6
- Duration: 1:53
- Height restriction: 130 cm (4 ft 3 in)
- Trains: 8 cars. Riders are arranged 4 across in a single row for a total of 32 riders per train.
- Pyrenees at RCDB

Pyrenees is an inverted roller coaster at Shima Spain Village in Shima, Mie, Japan. It opened in 1997 and was manufactured by Swiss company Bolliger & Mabillard. This roller coaster is inspired by the Pyrenees mountain range, being the natural border between Andorra, France and Spain.

== Ride experience ==
The train departs the station and immediately begins to ascend the 45-metre-tall (148 ft) lift hill. Once the train has crested the top of the lift hill, it banks to the right and drops at 100 kilometres per hour (62 mph) into a vertical loop. Exiting the vertical loop, the train then enters a zero-g roll, and then another vertical loop. Coming out of the second vertical loop, the train makes a high speed banked turn to the left and travels up into a cobra roll. Leaving the cobra roll, the train travels into a right hand helix which goes through the center of the second vertical loop. Pulling out of the helix, the train enters the mid-course brake run. Following the mid-course brake run, the train drops and enters a corkscrew which leads into a wide banked turn to the left. The train then travels over a small hill before making a right turn that leads into the final brake run.

Preceded by Montu	World's longest inverted roller coaster 1997– April 2014	Succeeded by Banshee
