= Shima Spain Village =

Theme park in Shima, Japan

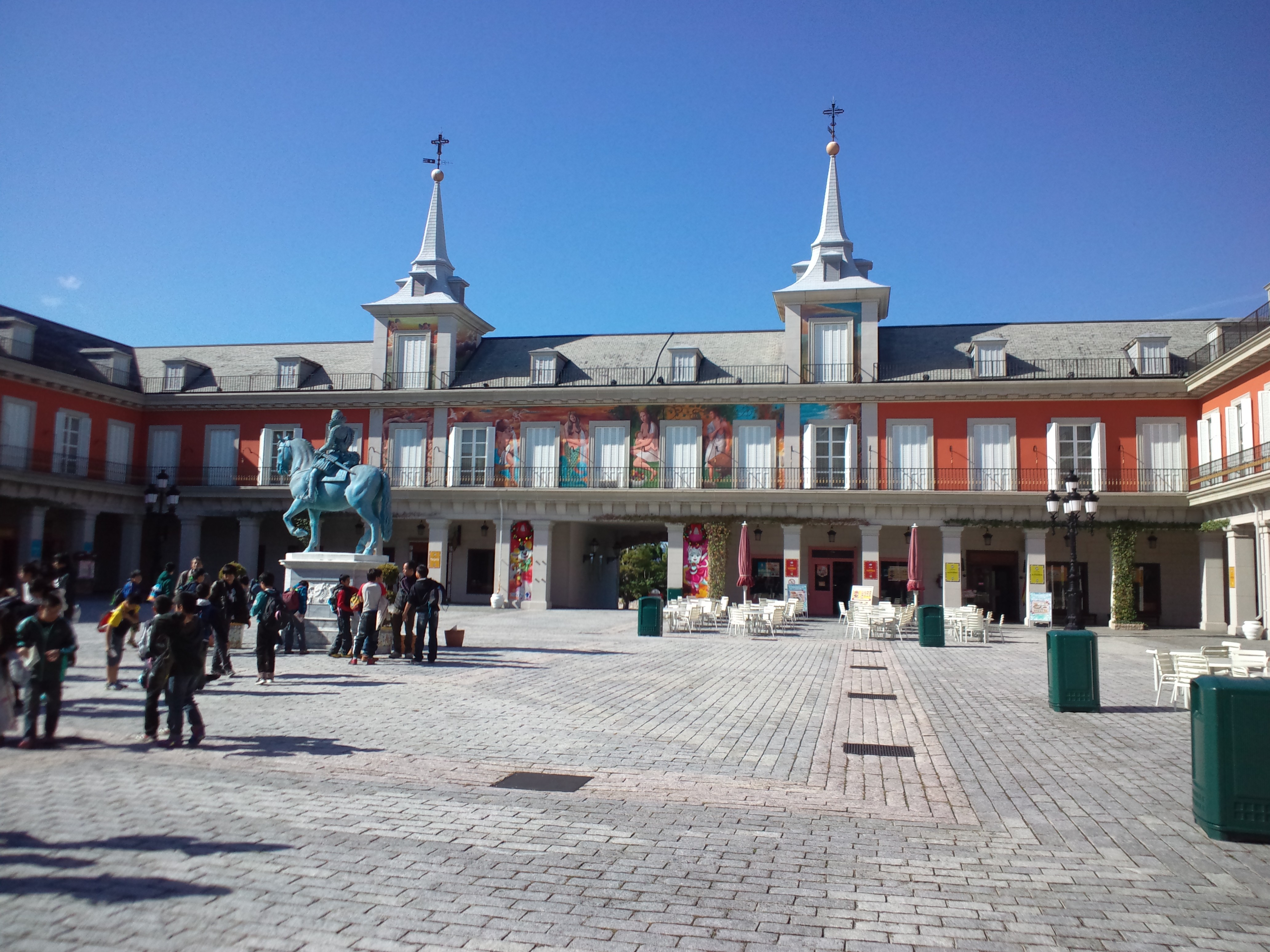
- Interactive map of Shima Spain Village
- Location: Shima, Mie Prefecture, Japan
- Coordinates: 34.360336°N 136.844940°E
- Opened: 22 April 1994; 32 years ago
- Owner: Shima Spain Village Co., Ltd. (Kintetsu Group Holdings)

Shima Spain Village (志摩スペイン村) is a theme park in Shima, Mie Prefecture, Japan, opened in April 1994. As the name suggests, the theme park is dedicated exclusively to Spain.

== Units ==
=== Parque España ===
Parque España is the core theme park facility of Shima Spain Village.

==== Roller coasters ====
Name	Type	Manufacturer	Model	Opened	Other statistics
Gran Monserrat	Steel	Mack Rides		1994	Length: 2,673.9 ft (815.0 m); Height: 65.6 ft (20.0 m); Speed: 41 mph (66 km/h); Duration: 2:14
Iron Bull	Steel	Sansei Yusoki			Length: 1,604.3 ft (489.0 m); Height: 39.3 ft (12.0 m); Speed: 32.3 mph (52.0 km/h)
Kiddy Monserrat	Steel	Hoei Sangyo		2016	Length: 708.7 ft (216.0 m); Height: 27.9 ft (8.5 m); Speed: 21.8 mph (35.1 km/h); Duration: 1:15
Pyrenees	Steel	Bolliger & Mabillard	Inverted Coaster	1997	Length: 4,048.6 ft (1,234.0 m); Height: 147.7 ft (45.0 m); Inversions: 6; Speed: 62.1 mph (99.9 km/h); Duration: 1:53

=== Hotel Shima Spain Village ===
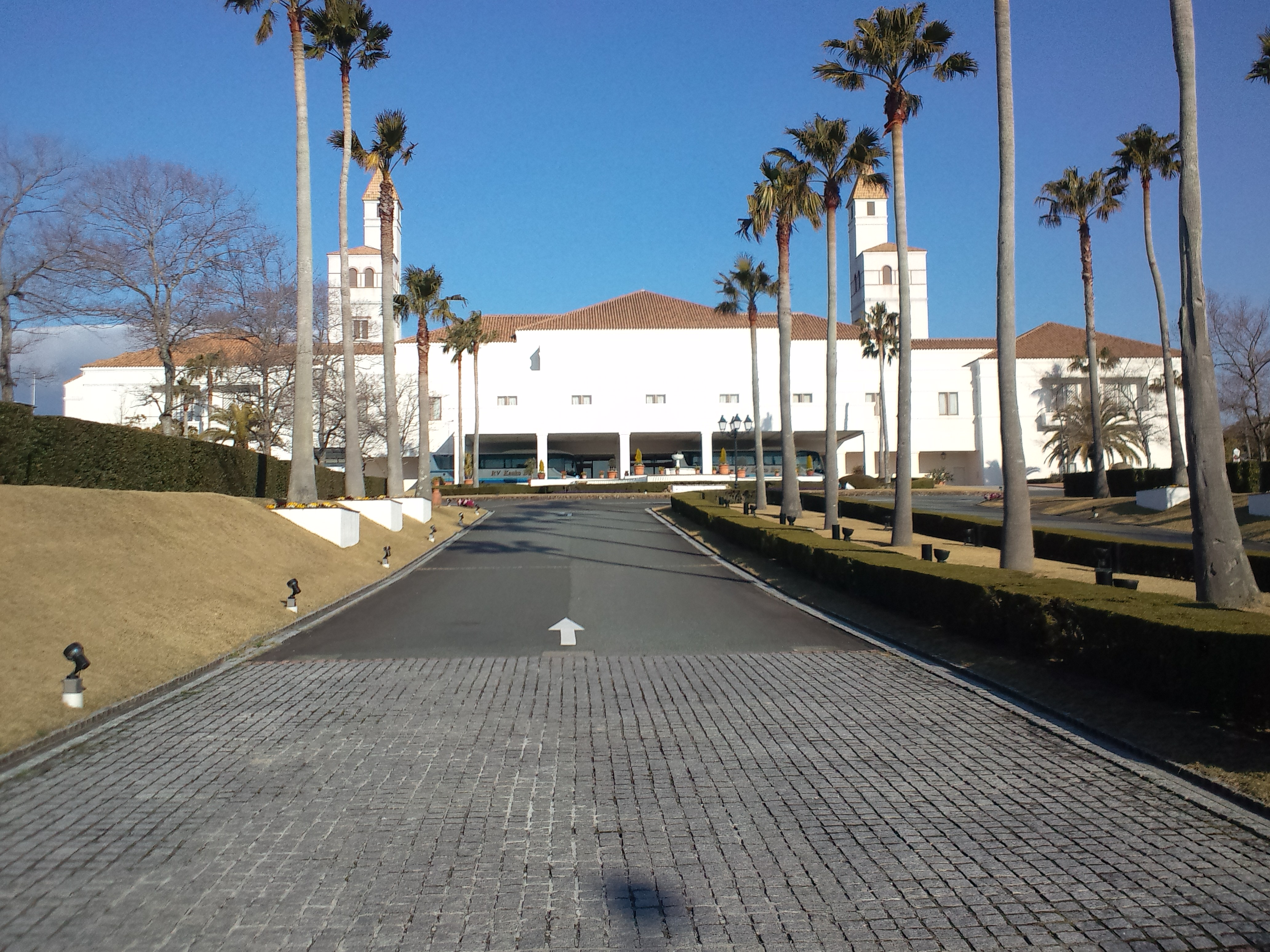
Hotel Shima Spain Village

Hotel Shima Spain Village is a 252-room hotel.

=== Himawari-no-Yu ===
Himawari-no-Yu is a natural hot spring.

== Tank-top Festival ==
The park currently hosts "Tank-top Festival", an annual event organised in collaboration with Japanese rock band yabai T-shirts yasan. The band originally planned to play a one-man concert at the park on March 2020, but it was postponed due to the COVID-19 pandemic. On 11-12 May 2024, a live concert was successfully held, celebrating the band's 10th anniversary and the park's 30th anniversary.

In 2025, the band returned to perform at the Shima Spain Village, this time in a festival format held on 10-11 May. Guests for the first day of the festival included Eito, 10-FEET, Taiiku Okazaki, and Kyuso Nekokami. On the second day of the festival, the band performed a one-man show.

In 2026, the festival was held again on 9-10 May. Musical guests included Hey-Smith, Su-xing-cyu, Orange Range, Wienners, Saba Sister, Singer's High, and Psychic Warrior Durian. Additionally, comedy acts Reiwa Roman and Takion (comedy duo) also performed at the festival.

In both 2025 and 2026, the park also produced collaboration items with the band including food, new photo spots, and merchandise. Additionally, the band's music and special announcements could be heard on various rides throughout the month or so around the festival.
