= Montu (roller coaster) =

Ride at Busch Gardens Tampa Bay

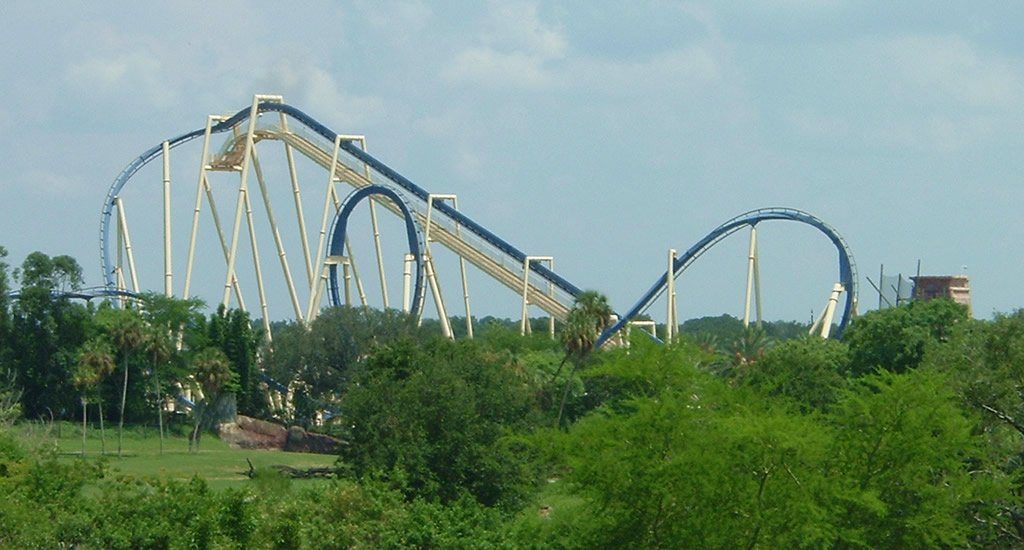
- An overview of Montu at Busch Gardens Tampa Bay

Busch Gardens Tampa Bay
- Location: Busch Gardens Tampa Bay
- Park section: Egypt
- Coordinates: 28°02′05″N 82°25′03″W
- Status: Operating
- Opening date: May 16, 1996
- Cost: US$20,000,000

General statistics
- Type: Steel – Inverted
- Manufacturer: Bolliger & Mabillard
- Designer: Werner Stengel
- Model: Inverted Coaster – Custom
- Lift/launch system: Chain lift hill
- Height: 150 ft (46 m)
- Drop: 128 ft (39 m)
- Length: 3,983 ft (1,214 m)
- Speed: 60 mph (97 km/h)
- Inversions: 7
- Duration: 3 minutes
- Max vertical angle: 50°
- Capacity: 1,710 riders per hour
- G-force: 3.8
- Height restriction: 54 in (137 cm)
- Trains: 3 trains with 8 cars; riders arranged 4 across in a single row for a total of 32 riders per train
- Quick Queue available
- Montu at RCDB

Montu is an inverted roller coaster at Busch Gardens Tampa Bay in Tampa, Florida, United States. Designed by Switzerland-based manufacturer Bolliger & Mabillard, it opened as the park's fourth roller coaster and their second manufactured by that company, following the success of Kumba, which opened 3 years prior. When the ride opened on May 16, 1996, it was the world's tallest and fastest inverted roller coaster, a title it has since conceded to Alpengeist at sister park Busch Gardens Williamsburg. The ride stands 150 feet (46 m) tall and reaches speeds of 60 miles per hour (97 km/h).

== History ==
The concept of an inverted roller coaster with inversions was developed by Jim Wintrode, the general manager of Six Flags Great America, in the early 1990s. To develop the idea, Wintrode worked with Walter Bolliger and Claude Mabillard—from Swiss roller coaster manufacturer Bolliger & Mabillard—and engineer Robert Mampe to develop Batman: The Ride which opened in May 1992.

In early 1995, planning began for Montu, fourteen months prior to the ride opening to the public. The owners of Busch Gardens Tampa Bay, Busch Entertainment (since renamed United Parks & Resorts), entered into an agreement with Bolliger and Mabillard which would see them add Montu to Busch Gardens Tampa Bay in 1996, followed in 1997 by the additions of Alpengeist at Busch Gardens Williamsburg and The Great White at SeaWorld San Antonio.

On August 23, 1995, Busch Gardens Tampa announced that they would be getting a new Egypt section. The area would cover 7 acres (2.8 ha) of land and feature a few attractions, including Tut's Tomb and the centerpiece attraction being a new Bolliger & Mabillard inverted roller coaster. It would be the first inverted roller coaster to feature seven inversions, as well as being the first roller coaster to feature an Immelmann loop. Besides this, the ride would be the first Bolliger & Mabillard coaster to feature a boomerang element, which debuted on Orient Express at Worlds of Fun in 1980. The Egypt section would be the largest and most expensive investment in Busch Gardens Tampa's history. On October 30, the park announced that they would be naming their new coaster Montu. On May 16, 1996, Montu officially opened to the public. At the time of its opening to the public, the ride was the tallest and fastest inverted roller coaster in the world.

For the 2022 season, Montu was repainted with a darker navy blue track and yellow supports.

== Characteristics ==
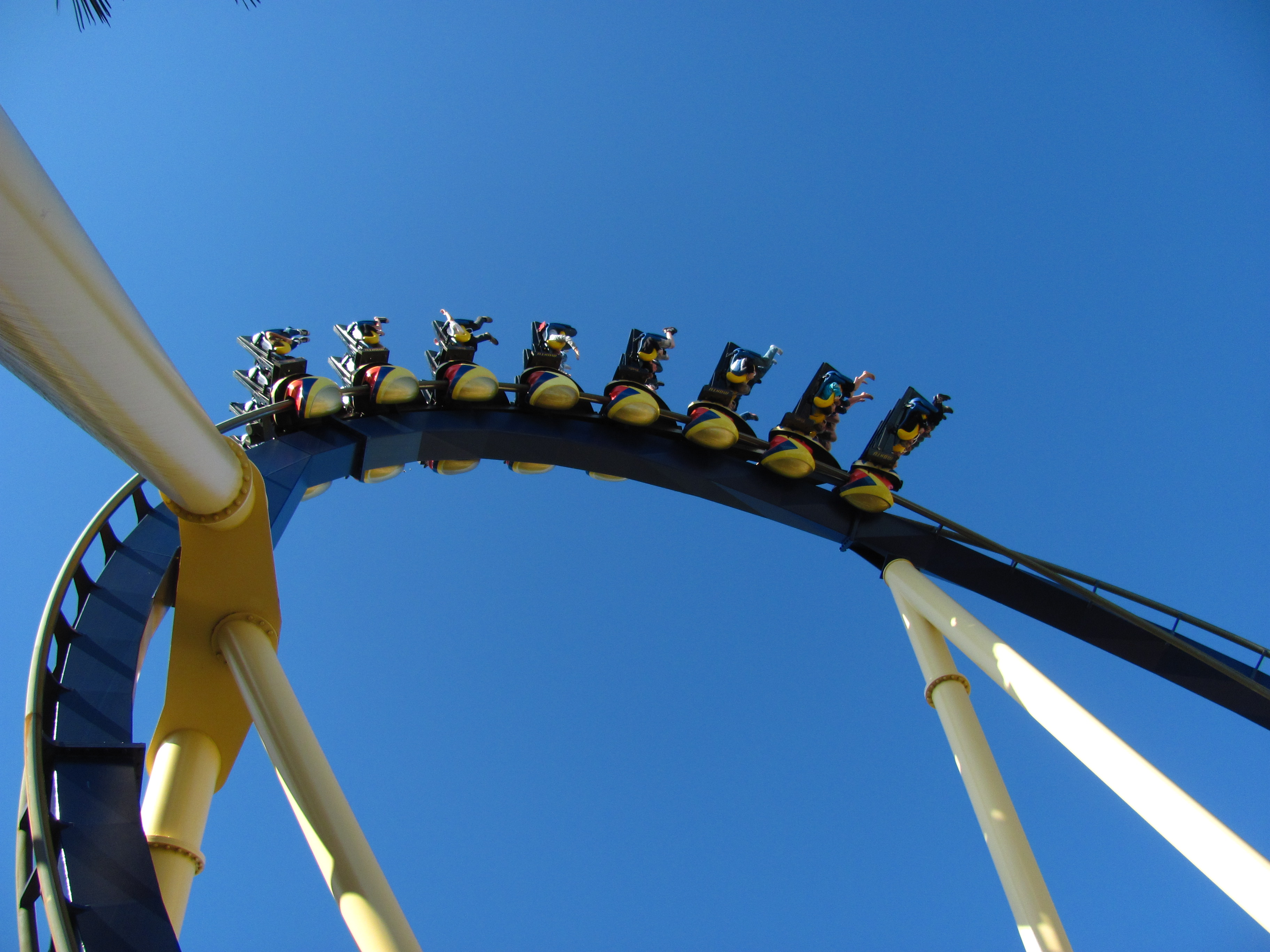
One of Montu's trains exiting the Immelmann loop

The 3,983-foot-long (1,214 m) Montu stands 150 feet (46 m) tall, and has a drop of 128 feet (39 m) With a top speed of 60 miles per hour (97 km/h), the ride features seven inversions including two vertical loops measuring 104 and 60 feet (32 and 18 m), respectively, a 90-foot (27 m) Immelmann loop, a zero-g roll, a batwing and a corkscrew. It has the most inversions on an inverted coaster, tied with Banshee at Kings Island. Riders experience up to 3.8 times the force of gravity on the 3 minute ride. Montu operates with three steel and fiberglass trains, each containing eight cars, each seating 4 riders per row for a total of 32 riders per train.

Montu was launched alongside Busch Gardens Tampa Bay's Egypt section of the park, which reportedly cost approximately US$20 million. With an overall theme around Egyptian mythology, the ride is named after the god of war Montu, a man depicted with the head of a hawk. When the ride was first launched, a Nile crocodile exhibit was located underneath the first turn out of the station. These animals were later relocated to the park's main animal habitat.

== Ride experience ==
=== Queue ===
Guests enter an Egyptian temple, where the queue takes place. The queue begins with a large outdoor area with switchbacks. There is an extended queue area with multiple pathways and a viewing area of the ride. Following this, guests navigate through a corridor. They enter another area containing Egyptian murals on the walls. Guests then enter the station where they board the ride. An extra switchback section can occasionally be used to access the front seat.

=== Layout ===
The ride begins with the floor retracting, which leads to the front gate opening. The train leaves the station with a small dip and turnaround out of the station tracking towards the 150-foot-tall (46 m) chain lift hill. Once at the top, riders twist down a 128-foot-tall (39 m) left-handed drop and into a 104-foot-tall (32 m) vertical loop, reaching speeds of up to 60 miles per hour (97 km/h). Following the vertical loop, the track passes through a tunnel and zooms into a 90-foot-tall (27 m) tall Immelmann loop, providing a footchopper element with the pylon. After completing the Immelmann, the train goes through a zero-g roll, where riders experience a feeling of weightlessness. Following the zero-g roll, the track hits a batwing, entering a trench at the valley between the two inversions. Leaving the batwing, the track rises up into the mid-course brake run. Following the second brake run, the track makes a dive to the right into a trench where it hits a 60-foot-tall (18 m) vertical loop. The track then exits the trench, making a three-quarter clockwise turn. After passing under the zero-g roll, the track makes a left-hand turn over the first vertical loop's exit and dives into another trench to hit a corkscrew, before making another right turn onto the final brake run.

== Reception ==
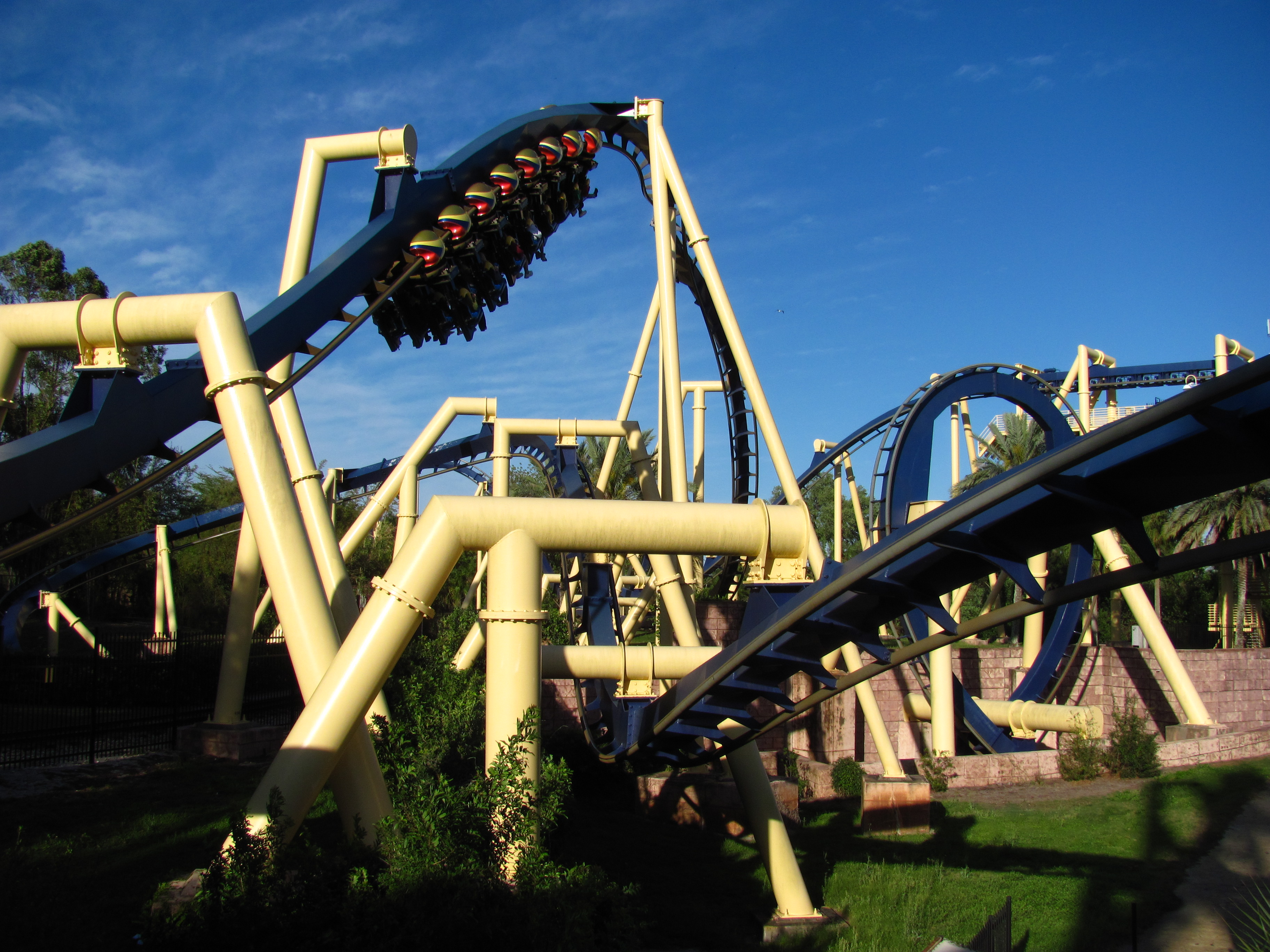
One of Montu's trains entering the zero-g roll

Montu has generally been well received. Tom Buckingham of the Sarasota Herald-Tribune commended the ride, giving kudos to the park "for designing its monster rides so that wait times put Disney to shame". He stated, "you'll generally be on the ride and screaming" before riders get a chance to change their mind. Sabrina Rojas Weiss of the Lakeland Ledger stated "the way this ride twisted my body upside-down and sideways seriously confused my senses". The Los Angeles Times put the ride on their "high rollers" list of new roller coasters for 1996. In 2012, Montu was featured on the Travel Channel TV series Insane Coaster Wars in the "Hang 'em High" category. Although the ride lost out to Aftershock at Silverwood Theme Park, Theme Park Review's Robb Alvey believed Montu would beat the competition which also included SeaWorld Orlando's Manta and Busch Gardens Williamsburg's Alpengeist.

In Amusement Today's annual Golden Ticket Awards, Montu has consistently ranked highly. It debuted at position 3 in 1998, before rising to position 2 the following year.

Golden Ticket Awards: Top steel Roller Coasters
Year									1998	1999
Ranking									3	2
Year	2000	2001	2002	2003	2004	2005	2006	2007	2008	2009
Ranking	4	5	9	12	9	10	8	10	10	11
Year	2010	2011	2012	2013	2014	2015	2016	2017	2018	2019
Ranking	12	14	14	18	22	24	22	27	28	30 (tie)
Year	2020	2021	2022	2023	2024	2025	2026			
Ranking	N/A	22	29	34	39	38	42			

== See also ==
- Phoenix Rising, another inverted roller coaster located at Busch Gardens Tampa Bay

Preceded by Raptor	World's tallest inverted roller coaster May 1996–March 1997	Succeeded by Alpengeist
Preceded by Raptor	World's fastest inverted roller coaster May 1996–March 1997	Succeeded by Alpengeist
Preceded by Raptor	World's longest inverted roller coaster May 1996– 1997	Succeeded by Pyrenees
