= Smurf Mountain =

Defunct amusement park train ride

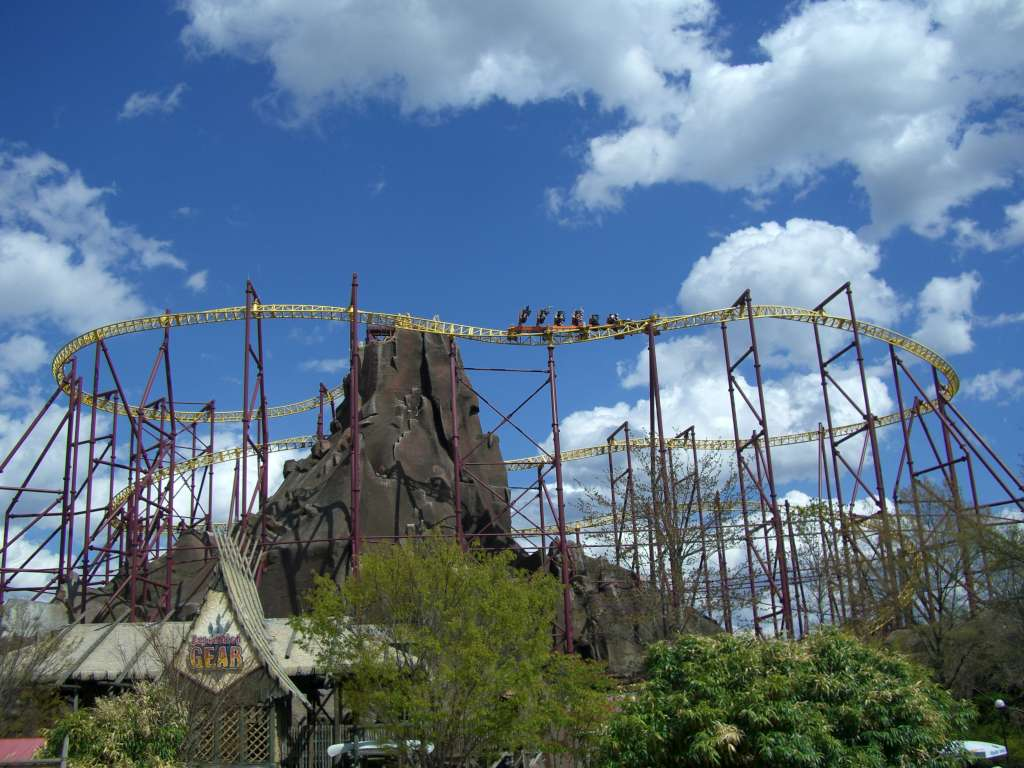
- Volcano, The Blast Coaster, which took over Smurf Mountain. Volcano, The Blast Coaster was torn down in 2019.

Kings Dominion
- Area: Congo
- Coordinates: 37°50′21.7″N 77°26′24.6″W
- Status: Removed
- Cost: US$17 million (the whole "Lost World")
- Opening date: 1984
- Closing date: 1995
- Replaced: The Land of Dooz
- Replaced by: Volcano: The Blast Coaster (1998–2018)

Ride statistics
- Attraction type: Train

Smurf Mountain was a powered mine train ride through a mountain past several animated scenes at Kings Dominion in Doswell, Virginia, United States.

== History ==
In 1979, "The Lost World" opened, 4 years after Kings Dominion's opening. With 17 million dollars, the park's largest capital investment at the time was a 170-foot (52 m) tall mountain and its three rides: "Journey to Atlantis", a gentle flume ride through the mountain that ended with a substantial drop exiting the mountain, "Land of Dooz", a train ride, and "The Time Shaft", a rotor themed with music and strobe lights were located inside and outside of the mountain.

In 1980, "Journey to Atlantis" was changed to "Haunted River", adding heavily themed spooky scenery. "Smurf Mountain" opened in 1984, replacing "Land of Dooz". It became the new nickname for the mountain after that period. Time Shaft was refurbished constantly because of people getting nauseous after riding.

Due to declining popularity, Smurf Mountain was ultimately closed in 1995, two years after Paramount Parks' purchase of the park. The former spot of Smurf Mountain was originally set to be home to an upcoming attraction themed to Congo. However, these plans were cancelled when the film underperformed at the box office. After sitting dormant for 3 years, it was finally replaced with Volcano, The Blast Coaster in 1998. In February 2019, it was announced that Volcano, The Blast Coaster would be removed and in May 2019, after 40 years, the entire mountain was demolished as well.
