= Le Scoot Log Flume =

Log flume at Busch Gardens Williamsburg

Coordinates: 37.233045°N 76.647896°W

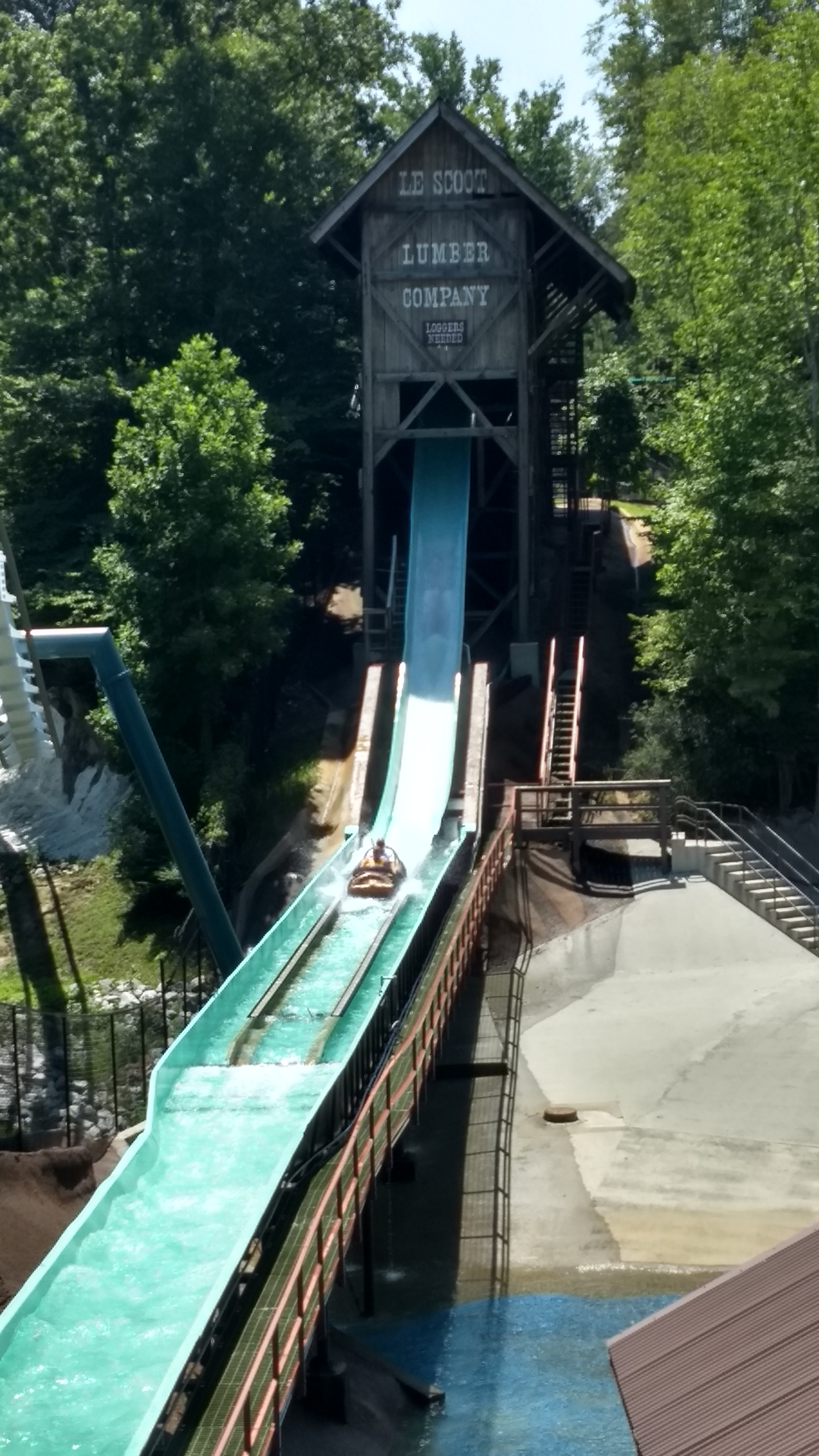

Busch Gardens Williamsburg
- Area: New France (French Colonial)
- Status: Operating
- Opening date: 1975

General statistics
- Type: Log flume
- Manufacturer: Arrow Development
- Lift system: Conveyor belt lift hill
- Capacity: 4 per log riders per hour
- Quick Queue available

Le Scoot is a log flume ride at Busch Gardens Williamsburg located in the New France area. It is themed after mountains and a saw mill.

== Ride experience ==
Once seated in the "logs", riders are taken up a conveyor belt lift hill. Part of the hill loops underneath another part of the ride. At the top, the log descends a small drop and takes a sharp turn, intertwining with InvadR's lift hill. When passing by treetops, the chute the ride is in expands (although rails keep the log on-track) to give the illusion the log is in a pond. A conveyor belt then brings the log up a few feet and takes a steep, tall drop. After passing more rails, the log takes a turn near a sawmill narrowly dodged by Alpengeist. Once in the sawmill, another small conveyor belt takes the logs up a few feet. The log then takes its largest plunge over a large pool of water. A last, small hill takes the logs on a sharp turn extremely close to Alpengeist's zero-g roll.

== History and operation ==
The ride opened in 1975 when Busch Gardens first opened. The 450,000 gallons of water in the log flume are treated to maintain the water quality of a swimming pool. There was media speculation in 2006 that the ride would be replaced in favor of a new roller coaster; the log flume's 120 feet (37 m) drop was considered to be less appealing than a modern roller coaster. Renovations in 2015 added a computerized control system, replaced fiberglass portions of the ride, and treated the ride's steels structure.
