= Dual-tracked roller coaster =

Type of roller coaster

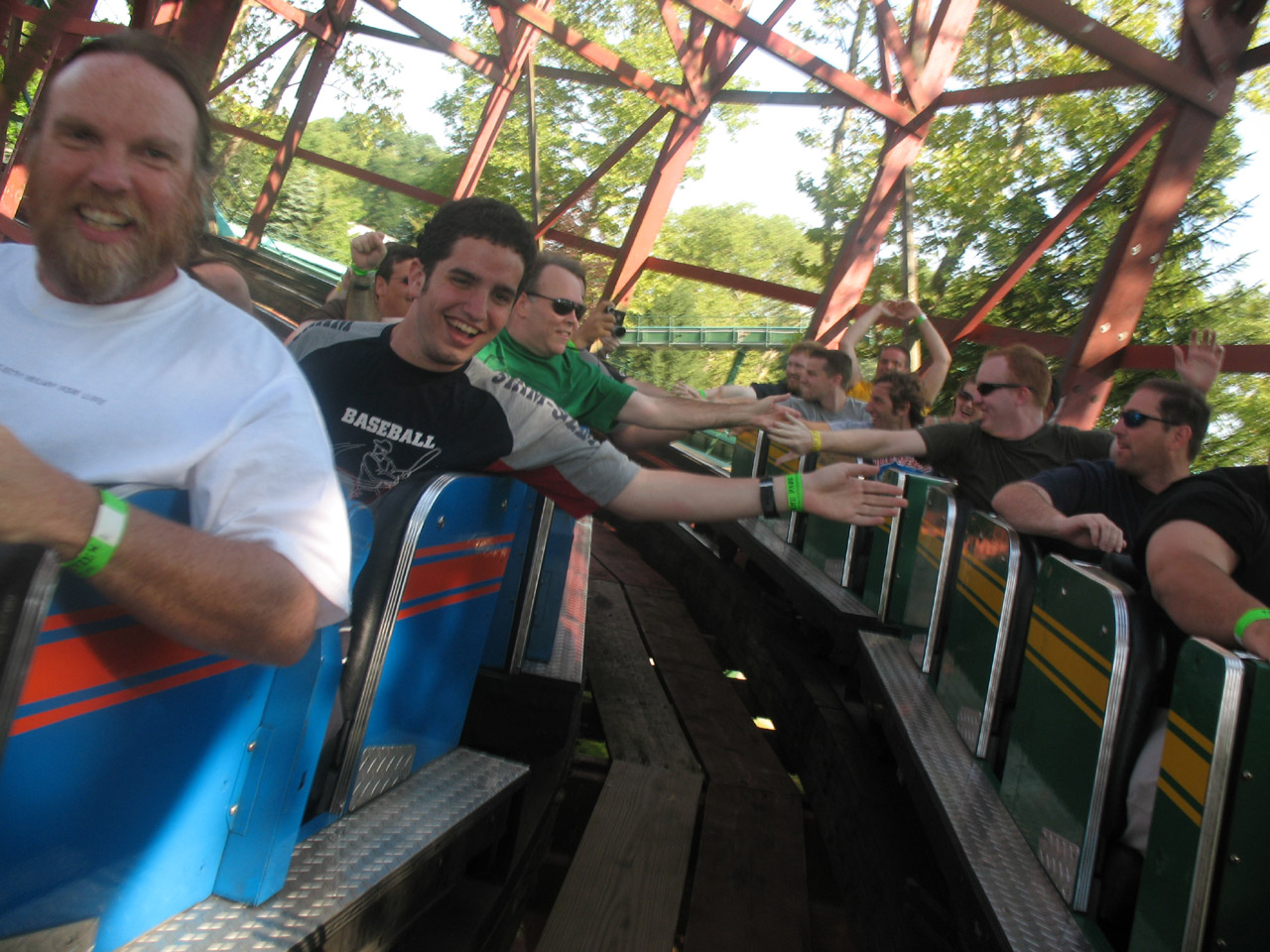
Riders high-five on Racer at Kennywood

A dual-tracked roller coaster is a roller coaster that consists of two tracks. They can be configured as racing, dueling, or Möbius loop roller coasters. Some dual-track coasters operate only one track side at a time, including Rolling Thunder and Colossus. Others may opt to run one side facing frontward and one side facing backward.

== Variants ==
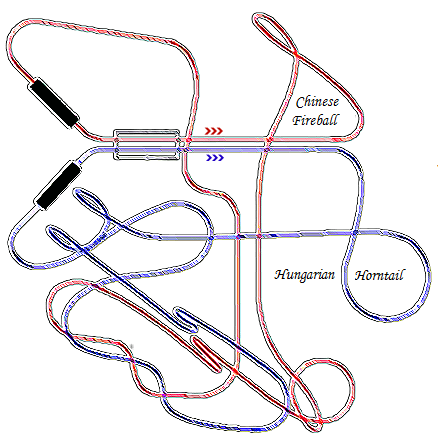
Dragon Challenge in The Wizarding World of Harry Potter, which operated from the opening of Islands of Adventure in 1999 until 2017, was a dueling inverted roller coaster.

Racing roller coaster: consists of two separate roller coasters that travel along parallel or mirrored tracks to simulate a race between the trains. The coaster trains travel along tracks just a few feet apart from one another. They often get close enough for riders to reach out and slap hands with riders on the opposite train, though this is extremely dangerous. These coasters are usually old wooden coasters.

Dueling roller coaster: features two (or more) roller coasters, usually with a similar layout, built close to each other. The rides are designed to do just as the name indicates: to duel. The coaster's layout often consists of strategic maneuvering to produce near-misses between the two coaster trains, designed to induce a greater adrenaline rush for the rider than a stand-alone roller coaster.

Möbius loop roller coaster: this can be a racing roller coaster or a dueling roller coaster; there is one continuous track shared by both trains. As a result, the side of the station that a train begins on is not the same side on which it returns. For each cycle, each train travels half the track. In less common configurations, a Möbius loop coaster train travels the entire length of the track before returning, such as with Twisted Colossus and West Coast Racers at Six Flags Magic Mountain.

== Examples ==
Coaster name	Park	Location	Track	Type	Builder	Year opened	Notes
American Eagle	Six Flags Great America	(United States) Gurnee, Illinois	Wooden	Racing	Intamin	1981	Tallest and fastest racing wooden roller coaster in the world.
Batman & Robin: The Chiller	Six Flags Great Adventure	(United States) Jackson, New Jersey	Steel	Dueling	Premier Rides	1997	Closed in 2007.
Battlestar Galactica: Human vs. Cylon	Universal Studios Singapore	Sentosa, Singapore	Steel	Dueling	Vekoma	2010	This is the World’s Tallest Dueling Coasters, themed to the Battlestar Galactica television series with "Cylon" and "Human" sides. The former is a launched high-thrill inverted coaster while the latter is a launched family-friendly sit-down coaster.
Dauling Dragon	Happy Valley Wuhan	Wuhan, Hubei, China	Wooden	Racing	Martin & Vleminckx	2012	China's first large-scale racing roller coaster. Designed by The Gravity Group.
Dawson Duel	Bellewaerde	Ypres, Belgium	Hybrid	Racing	Wiegand	2017	First-ever gravity-powered racing mountain coasters, and the first to use an artificial slope.
Dragon Challenge	Universal's Islands of Adventure	(United States) Orlando, Florida	Steel	Dueling	Bolliger & Mabillard	1999	An inverted roller coaster formerly known as Dueling Dragons. After 2011, the dueling aspect of the ride was removed due to multiple incidents. Closed and scrapped in 2017.
Dueling Dragons	Guangzhou Sunac Land Resort	Guangzhou, Guangdong, China.	Steel	Dueling	Intamin	2019	A steel launched roller coaster featuring a two trains, one inverted and second sit-down trains. The first dueling LSM triple launch coaster.
Gemini	Cedar Point	(United States) Sandusky, Ohio	Steel	Racing	Arrow Dynamics	1978	Steel-tracked roller coaster with wooden supports.
Grand National	Blackpool Pleasure Beach	(United Kingdom) Blackpool, Lancashire	Wooden	Möbius Loop	Charles Paige	1935	
Gwazi	Busch Gardens Tampa	(United States) Tampa, Florida	Wooden	Dueling	Great Coasters International	1999	Only the Lion side was operating as of 2012, and closed officially in 2015. It was reconstructed by manufacturer Rocky Mountain Construction into a non-dueling hybrid roller coaster named Iron Gwazi.
Joris en de Draak	Efteling	(Netherlands) Kaatsheuvel	Wooden	Dueling and Racing	Great Coasters International	2010	
Lightning Racer	Hersheypark	(United States) Hershey, Pennsylvania	Wooden	Dueling and Racing	Great Coasters International	2000	
Matterhorn Bobsleds	Disneyland	(United States) Anaheim, California	Steel		Arrow Dynamics	1959	Weaves around and through a replica of the Matterhorn. World's first tubular steel roller coaster.
Desmo Race	Mirabilandia	Italy	Steel	Spike, Dueling and Racing	Maurer AG	2019	It is the world's first and only dueling Spike Dragster coaster. Situated in Ducati World in Mirabilandia. (Closed May 18, 2025)
Max Adventures Master Thai	Mirabilandia	Italy	Steel	Möbius loop	Preston & Barbieri	2011	Riders simultaneously board on both halves of the Möbius loop.
Milky Way	Mitsui Greenland	(Japan) Arao, Kumamoto	Steel	Racing	Senyo Kogyo Co., Ltd.	1991	Stand-up roller coaster
Le Monstre	La Ronde	(Canada) Montréal, Québec	Wooden	Racing	William Cobb & Associates	1985/86	One track opened in 1985, the other in 1986
Montaña Rusa	La Feria Chapultepec Mágico	Mexico City	Wooden	Möbius loop	National Amusement Device Company	1964	Closed 2019, demolished 2022
The Racer	Kings Island	(United States) Mason, Ohio	Wooden	Racing	Philadelphia Toboggan Coasters	1972	Credited for starting the "Second Coaster Boom". One train formerly ran backwards until 2008. World's fastest racing coaster (1972–1976).
Racer	Kennywood	(United States) West Mifflin, Pennsylvania	Wooden	Möbius loop	Charile Mach	1927	
Ramses	Parque de Atracciones de Zaragoza	(Spain) Zaragoza	Steel	Racing	Safeco	2002	Opened in 1987 at Parque de Atracciones de Montjuic, named as "Vikingo". It stayed until the park's closure in 1998, and reopened with a new theming, location and name in 2002. First half pipe roller coaster ever built in a park.
Racer 75	Kings Dominion	(United States) Doswell, Virginia	Wooden	Racing	Philadelphia Toboggan Coasters	1975	One train formerly ran backwards until 2008.
Rolling Thunder	Six Flags Great Adventure	(United States) Jackson, New Jersey	Wooden	Racing	William Cobb & Associates	1979	Ride had two tracks in a figure 8 pattern, but the hills are arranged differently on each track. Closed in 2013 to make way for Zumanjaro: Drop of Doom.
Space Mountain	Magic Kingdom	(United States) Bay Lake, Florida	Steel		Arrow Dynamics	1975	Oldest operating roller coaster in Florida.
Stampida	PortAventura Park	Barcelona, Spain	Steel	Racing	Custom Coasters International	1997	
Stardust Racers	Universal Epic Universe	(United States) Orlando, Florida	Steel	Dueling	Mack Rides	2025	The World’s Fastest and Longest Dueling Coasters.
Thunder Road	Carowinds	(United States) Charlotte, North Carolina	Wooden	Racing	Philadelphia Toboggan Coasters	1976	Crosses the North Carolina/South Carolina state line. One train formerly ran backwards until 2008. Closed and demolished in 2015.
Twisted Colossus	Six Flags Magic Mountain	(United States) Valencia, California	Steel	Quasi Möbius	Rocky Mountain Construction	2015	Originally constructed as Colossus, it opened in 1978 as a traditional two-track racing roller coaster. The ride closed on August 16, 2014 and reopened on May 23, 2015 as Twisted Colossus, a reconstructed hybrid wood/steel roller coaster. Unlike most "Möbius loop" racing/dueling coasters, Twisted Colossus has one station and trains go through both sides of the "Möbius loop" on one cycle. The ride experience often does not involve a racing element as it is dependent on the time taken to dispatch the trains from the station.
Vertigorama	Parque de la Ciudad	(Argentina) Buenos Aires City	Steel	Racing	Intamin	1983	Track built but electrical never completed.
Vleermuis	Plopsaland	De Panne, West Flanders, Belgium	Steel	Racing	Caripro	2000	Suspended roller coaster. Sold in 2018 to Trans Studio Bali, a park outside Europe.
West Coast Racers	Six Flags Magic Mountain	(United States) Valencia, California	Steel	Quasi Möbius	Premier Rides	2020	This is a Möbius loop racing coaster similar to Twisted Colossus, also found at the park. Unlike Twisted Colossus, the racing element is guaranteed, as the train will be held next to the station upon completion of the first half of the loop until the next train is dispatched.
Windjammer Surf Racers	Knott's Berry Farm	(United States) Buena Park, California	Steel	Racing	TOGO	1997	Closed in 2000 due to various problems.
YOY	Walibi Holland	Biddinghuizen, Netherlands	Steel	Dueling	Rocky Mountain Construction	2025	Two tracks, one family oriented blue "Chill" side, and one thrill oriented green "Thrill" side with 6 inversions
Kid Flash Cosmic Coaster	Six Flags Fiesta Texas and Six Flags Over Georgia	(United States) San Antonio, Texas and (United States) Austell, Georgia	Steel	Racing	Skyline Attractions	2023	Texas’ only racing roller coaster Georgia’s first single-rail coaster and only racing coaster
Minifigure Speedway	Legoland Windsor	(United Kingdom) Windsor, Berkshire	Steel	Dueling	Zierer	2024	First dual-tracked coaster manufactured by Zierer.
