= Ednör – L'Attaque =

Steel roller coaster at La Ronde

- Previously known as Serial Thriller at Six Flags AstroWorld (1999-2005)
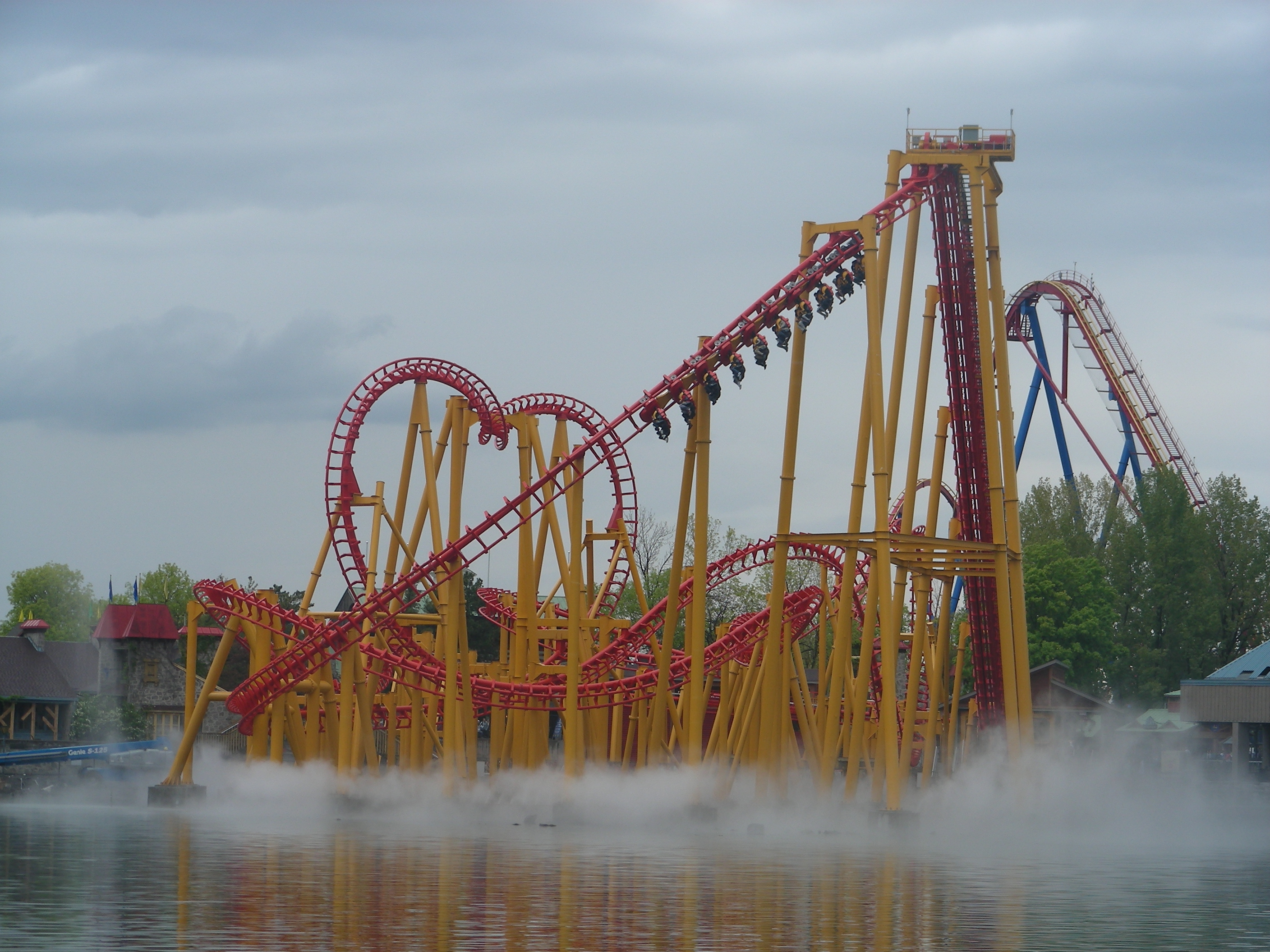
- Ednör – L'Attaque as seen from the opposite side of Lac des Dauphins

La Ronde
- Coordinates: 45.5259°N 73.5367°W
- Status: Operating
- Opening date: May 15, 2010
- Cost: $10 Million

Six Flags AstroWorld
- Coordinates: 29.6774°N 95.4066°W
- Status: Removed
- Opening date: May 29, 1999
- Closing date: October 30, 2005

General statistics
- Type: Steel – Inverted
- Manufacturer: Vekoma
- Model: SLC (689m Standard)
- Lift/launch system: Chain lift hill
- Height: 109.3 ft (33.3 m)
- Drop: 27.7 m (91 ft)
- Length: 2,260.5 ft (689.0 m)
- Speed: 49.7 mph (80.0 km/h)
- Inversions: 5
- Duration: 1 min, 36 sec
- Max vertical angle: 59°
- Capacity: 1040 riders per hour
- G-force: 3.1
- Height restriction: 52 in (132 cm)
- Trains: 2 trains with 10 cars. Riders are arranged 2 across in a single row for a total of 20 riders per train.
- Accès Rapide available
- Ednör – L'Attaque at RCDB

Ednör – L'Attaque is an inverted roller coaster at La Ronde in Montreal, Quebec, Canada. Built by Vekoma, it is a standard 689-meter Suspended Looping Coaster (SLC). It debuted in 1999 as Serial Thriller at Six Flags AstroWorld in Houston, Texas. Following the closure of AstroWorld in 2005, Serial Thriller was dismantled and moved to Six Flags Great Escape and Hurricane Harbor in Queensbury, New York. After sitting idle in New York for four years, it was relocated to La Ronde and opened for the 2010 season.

== History ==
=== Operation at AstroWorld ===
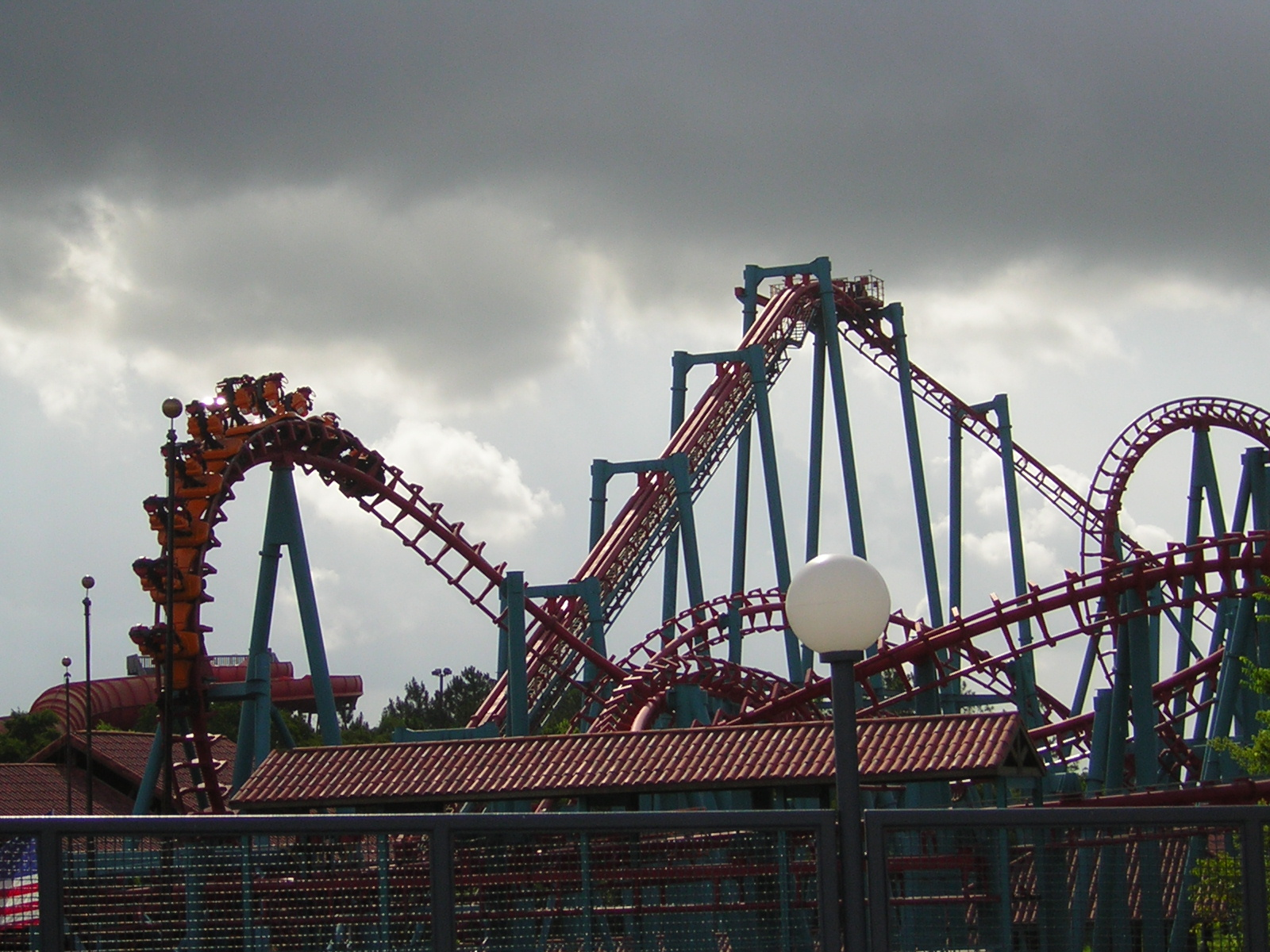
Serial Thriller at AstroWorld

Following the closure of the 1998 season, Six Flags announced that Excalibur, the park's mine train that had been in operation since 1971, would be removed. In its place, the park announced Serial Thriller for the following season. The coaster, costing $10 million, was part of a larger $16 million investment that included a new catering facility and two new attractions for the adjacent WaterWorld water park. It was the largest single season investment in the park's history, and the fifth new coaster in the previous ten seasons. The ride opened on May 29, 1999, and operated for seven seasons. It closed along with the rest of the park at the end of the operating season on October 30, 2005.

=== Relocation ===
After the final operating day of the park, Six Flags quickly removed the rides it intended to keep. Serial Thriller was dismantled and moved to The Great Escape and Hurricane Harbor in Queensbury, New York in late 2005. Although it was assumed the ride would be added to the park, no announcements were made. Local municipal planners never received any planning permits. Authorities at the park refused to discuss plans and would not confirm that there was a coaster on the property, even though it was visible from Route 9, and clearly matched the colors and style of track of the ride that had been removed from Six Flags AstroWorld.

=== Reopening at La Ronde ===
In September 2009, the parts of Serial Thriller were removed from storage at The Great Escape and were shipped off to La Ronde in Montreal, Quebec, Canada, where they were displayed in the entrance area.

Between February and April 2010, Lac des Dauphins (Dolphin Lake), the lake in the center of the park was partially drained and the ride was installed at the north edge, with more than half of the ride footings in the lake. The ride was installed by Martin & Vleminckx, the same company that built Le Monstre, and is responsible for multiple ride installations within the park. On April 15, 2010, La Ronde announced that the new name for the ride would be Ednör – L'Attaque, based on a fictional Norwegian sea monster that escaped from Lac des Dauphins during excavation for the ride. Ednor is Ronde spelled backward. Once construction was complete, the lake level was returned to normal giving thrillseekers the illusion that they were nearly skimming the surface of the water.

Season pass holders were given a preview of the ride on May 15–16, 2010. The ride opened to the general public on May 22, 2010.

== Ride experience ==
The ride queue is themed to resemble an interpretation center dedicated to the study of sea monsters. It features a pre-show that talks about various sea monsters around the world including Champ, Ponik and The Loch Ness Monster. After riders board the train, they ascend the 109-foot (33 m) lift hill situated over the water. After cresting its highest point, the train turns right and drops 85 feet (26 m) down to the surface of the lake, reaching speeds of up to 50 mph (80 km/h). The train then ascends into the SLC signature roll-over inversion, then drops again back down to the surface of the lake. This element inverts riders twice and is shaped like a heart. Next, the train travels through a banked hill and into a Sidewinder next to the station, followed by a 270-degree downward helix over dry land. Exiting the helix leads riders into a double inline twist that heads back toward the lake. The train curves again, dips, and rises up into the first brake run. The train curves to the right and will typically park there on the transfer track waiting for the station to clear. Another curve to the right takes riders into the loading platform.
