= Martin & Vleminckx =

Roller coaster manufacturer

Martin & Vleminckx Ltd.
- Trade name: MV Rides
- Type: Private
- Industry: Manufacturing
- Founder: Ghislain Martin; Alain Vleminckx
- Headquarters: Montreal, Quebec, Canada
- Area served: Worldwide
- Number of employees: 50
- Website: mvrides.com

Martin & Vleminckx Ltd. (doing business as MV Rides) is a thrill ride and roller coaster manufacturing and construction company headquartered in Montreal, Canada, with an affiliated office in Vancouver, a manufacturing facility in Orlando, and two subsidiaries, including a warehouse in China.

== History ==
Martin & Vleminckx was founded in 1984 and specializes in the installation of wooden coasters, though they can install steel coasters and other rides as well. They also offer repair and refurbishment work.

In November 2022, Martin & Vleminckx acquired the patent portfolio of Bill Kitchen, which included products such as the Unicoaster, the SkyBlazer, the Skyspire, the Polercoaster, the G-Storm, the Vistawheel, and the Thrillwheel.

== Projects ==
Martin & Vleminckx has constructed over 100 roller coasters and other amusement rides initially manufactured by other companies, including Bolliger & Mabillard, The Gravity Group, Chance Morgan, Hopkins Rides, Intamin, Maurer AG, ProSlide Technology, Vekoma, and Zamperla.

=== Manufacturing ===
- Coastersaurus at Legoland Florida
- Boardwalk Bullet at Kemah Boardwalk
- Wooden Coaster - Fireball at Happy Valley Shanghai
- Zippin Pippin at Bay Beach Amusement Park
- Dauling Dragon at Happy Valley Wuhan
- Fjord Flying Dragon at Happy Valley Tianjin
- Time Traveler at Hot Go Park
- Jungle Trailblazer at Oriental Heritage Jinan
- Jungle Trailblazer at Fantawild Dreamland Zhengzhou
- Jungle Trailblazer at Oriental Heritage Wuhu
- Jungle Trailblazer at Oriental Heritage Ningbo
- Jungle Trailblazer at Fantawild Dreamland Zhuzhou
- Jungle Trailblazer at Oriental Heritage Xiamen
- Jungle Trailblazer at Fantawild Asian Legend Nanning
- Thunder Eagle at Race World
- Thunder Coaster at Tusenfryd
- Robin Hood at Walibi Holland
- The Comet at Six Flags Great Escape and Hurricane Harbor
- Arkansas Twister at Magic Springs
- Le Monstre at La Ronde
- Twisted Twins at Kentucky Kingdom

=== Retrack ===
- Arkansas Twister at Magic Springs
- Big Dipper at Geauga Lake
- Blue Streak at Cedar Point
- Cheetah at Wild Adventures
- Wooden Roller Coaster at Playland
- Excalibur at Funtown Splashtown USA
- Great White at Morey's Piers
- Hercules at Dorney Park & Wildwater Kingdom
- Le Monstre at La Ronde
- Mean Streak at Cedar Point
- Raging Wolf Bobs at Geauga Lake
- Shivering Timbers at Michigan's Adventure
- Woodland Run at Kentucky Kingdom
- Villain at Geauga Lake
- Boulder Dash at Lake Compounce
- Wildcat at Lake Compounce
- The Wild One at Six Flags America
- Wolverine Wildcat at Michigan's Adventure
- Yankee Cannonball at Canobie Lake Park

=== Roller coaster construction ===
- Arkansas Twister at Magic Springs
- Batman: The Dark Knight at Six Flags New England
- Boomerangs at Elitch Gardens Theme Park, Jerudong Park, Kentucky Kingdom, La Ronde, Montjuïc, Parque de la Costa, Six Flags Fiesta Texas, Six Flags México, Six Flags New Orleans, Alabama Adventure & Splash Adventure, and Wild Adventures
- Chang at Kentucky Kingdom
- The Comet at Six Flags Great Escape and Hurricane Harbor
- Dragon at Legoland Florida
- Flying Coaster at Elitch Gardens Theme Park
- Flying School at Legoland Florida
- Goliath at La Ronde
- Kingda Ka at Six Flags Great Adventure
- Le Monstre at La Ronde
- Le Vampire at La Ronde
- Hollyhock and Roll at Kentucky Kingdom
- Super Manège at La Ronde
- Suspended Looping Coasters at Elitch Gardens Theme Park, Hunt's Pier, Kentucky Kingdom, Magic Springs, Opryland USA, Parque de la Costa, Six Flags America, Six Flags New England, and Wild Adventures
- Thundercoaster at Tusenfryd
- Thunder Eagle at Belle Island Village
- Top Thrill Dragster at Cedar Point
- Twisted Twins at Kentucky Kingdom
- X-Coaster at Magic Springs

=== Amusement ride construction ===
- Bugs' White Water Rapids at Six Flags Fiesta Texas
- Drop Tower at California's Great America
- Giant Wheel at Kentucky Kingdom
- Grand Carousel at La Ronde
- Grande Roue at La Ronde
- Manitou at La Ronde
- Menhir Express at Parc Astérix
- Mile High Falls at Kentucky Kingdom
- Navy Pier Ferris Wheel at Navy Pier
- Splash at La Ronde
- Superman: Tower of Power at Kentucky Kingdom
- Tour de ville at La Ronde
- Tower of Doom at Elitch Gardens Theme Park
- Vertigo at La Ronde

== List of roller coasters ==
As of 2026, Martin & Vleminckx has built 16 roller coasters.

Name	Model	Park	Country	Opened	Status	Ref
Coastersaurus	Wood Support Structure	Legoland Florida	United States	2004	Operating	
Boardwalk Bullet	Wood Support Structure	Kemah Boardwalk	United States	2007	Operating	
Wooden Coaster - Fireball	Wood Support Structure	Happy Valley Shanghai	China	2009	Operating	
Zippin Pippin	Wood Support Structure	Bay Beach Amusement Park	United States	2011	Operating	
Dauling Dragon	Wood Support Structure	Happy Valley Wuhan	China	2012	Operating	
Fjord Flying Dragon	Wood Support Structure	Happy Valley Tianjin	China	2013	Operating	
Time Travel	Wood Support Structure	Hot Go Park	China	2014	Operating	
Jungle Trailblazer	Wood Support Structure	Oriental Heritage Jinan	China	2015	Operating	
Jungle Trailblazer	Wood Support Structure	Fantawild Dreamland Zhengzhou	China	2015	Operating	
Jungle Trailblazer	Wood Support Structure	Oriental Heritage Wuhu	China	2015	Operating	
Jungle Trailblazer	Wood Support Structure	Oriental Heritage Ningbo	China	2016	Operating	
Jungle Trailblazer	Wood Support Structure	Fantawild Dreamland Zhuzhou	China	2016	Operating	
Jungle Trailblazer	Wood Support Structure	Oriental Heritage Xiamen	China	2017	Operating	
Jungle Trailblazer	Wood Support Structure	Fantawild Asian Legend	China	2018	Operating	
Wooden Dragons Roller Coaster	Wood Support Structure	Sunac Jinan	China	2021	Operating	
Leviathan	Wood Support Structure	Sea World	Australia	2022	Operating	
Unknown	Unknown	MagicLand	Italy	2027	Under construction	
