= Lightning Racer =

Roller coaster at Hersheypark

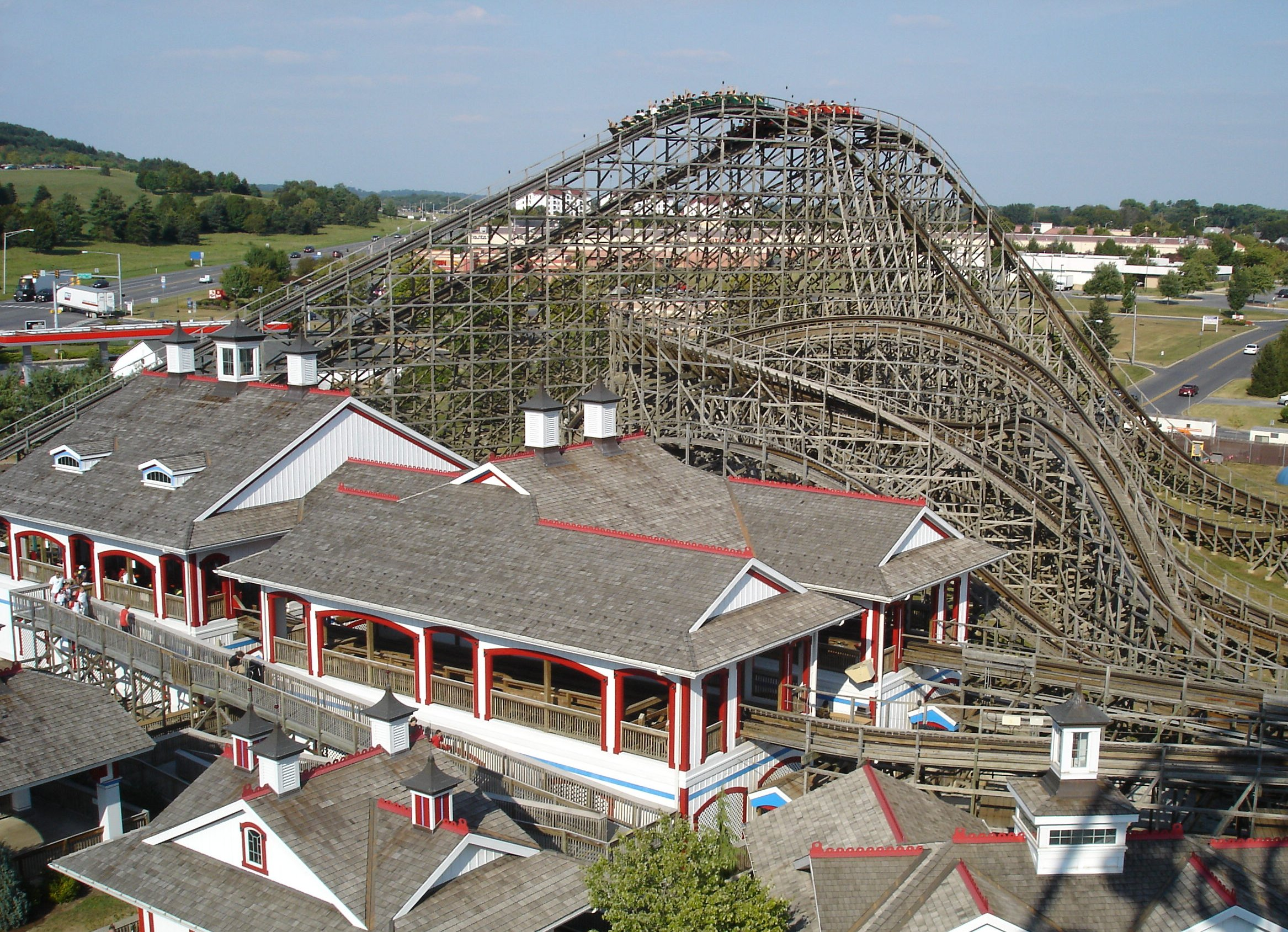

Hersheypark
- Park section: Midway America
- Coordinates: 40.292884°N 76.653171°W
- Status: Operating
- Opening date: May 13, 2000
- Cost: $12.5 million

General statistics
- Type: Wood – Racing – Dueling
- Manufacturer: Great Coasters International
- Model: Racing roller coaster
- Lift/launch system: Chain
	Lightning (Red)	Thunder (Green)
Height	92 ft (28.0 m)	92 ft (28.0 m)
Drop	90 ft (27.4 m)	90 ft (27.4 m)
Length	3,393 ft (1,034.2 m)	3,393 ft (1,034.2 m)
Speed	51 mph (82.1 km/h)	51 mph (82.1 km/h)
Inversions	0	0
Duration	2:20	2:20
Max vertical angle	45°	45°
G-force	3.6	3.6
- Height restriction: 48 in (122 cm)
- Trains: 4 trains with 12 cars. Riders are arranged 2 across in a single row for a total of 24 riders per train.
- Lightning Racer at RCDB; Pictures of Lightning Racer at RCDB

Lightning Racer is a wooden dueling roller coaster at Hersheypark in Hershey, Pennsylvania. Built by Great Coasters International (GCI) and designed by Mike Boodley of GCI, the ride was completed in 2000 within the Midway America section of the park. Lightning Racer was GCI's second roller coaster at Hersheypark.

Planning for what became Lightning Racer commenced in May 1999, and the ride opened to the general public on May 13, 2000. Lightning Racer cost $12.5 million to construct, and it consists of two tracks, which are both 3,393 feet (1,034 m) long. The ride's station was designed by Ralph E. Kaylor of Lebanon, Pennsylvania. Lightning Racer operates with four Millennium Flyer trains manufactured by GCI. Since 2001, Lightning Racer has consistently been voted one of the world's 25 best wooden roller coasters at the Golden Ticket Awards, which are presented annually by Amusement Today magazine.

== History ==
Planning for what became Lightning Racer commenced in May 1999, when employees of Great Coasters International (GCI) started creating sketches for a racing wooden roller coaster. A groundbreaking ceremony for the ride occurred in July 1999. The next month, Hershey Entertainment and Resorts Company announced that Hersheypark would be adding its eighth coaster, Lightning Racer. It would be the park's second roller coaster built by GCI, after the now-defunct Wildcat. After construction had started, GCI's engineers encountered some obstacles that had not been shown on the official topographic maps that Hersheypark had given them, including a fence and a Turkey Hill shop.

Lightning Racer opened to the general public on May 13, 2000, three days after a media event for the coaster was hosted. When the ride opened, Hersheypark had the most roller coasters of any amusement park in Pennsylvania. Through an agreement with Hersheypark, ice cream brand Green's (a subsidiary of Crowley Foods) promoted the ride by introducing an ice-cream flavor called Raspberry Blueberry Scream.

== Characteristics ==
Lightning Racer cost $12.5 million to construct and was designed by Mike Boodley of GCI. The roller coaster required about 341 miles (549 km) of southern yellow pine for its construction. It consists of two tracks (Thunder/Green and Lightning/Red), which are both 3,393 feet (1,034 m) long. A complete circuit on either track takes approximately two minutes and twenty seconds. The ride's lift hill is approximately 90 feet (27 m) tall. After the first drop, the ride reaches a top speed of 51 miles per hour (82 km/h). At several points in the layout, the tracks are as close as 5 feet (1.5 m) to each other. The trains pass by each other in opposite directions at a combined 70 miles per hour (110 km/h).

The ride's station was designed by Ralph E. Kaylor of Lebanon, Pennsylvania, and is made of heavy timber and wood frame. The station features architectural details such as shingle roofs, ventilation shafts, and cupolas. Unlike in other racing coasters, there is a single queue line for both tracks, allowing guests to select which track they want to ride. In addition to providing a shaded queue area for guests, the station contains a shop where on-ride photos from the coaster are sold.

Lightning Racer operates with four trains, which seat 24 riders per train. Trains were originally painted blue and white but have since been repainted red and green. The ride makes use of GCI's Millennium Flyer articulated trains. Both tracks travel through the same elements, although at different times. Speed is affected by factors such as riders' weight, temperature, and lubrication; even riders' clothing has been known to affect the ride's speed. There is a 128-foot-long (39 m) tunnel about halfway through the course on both tracks. Both sides contain an on-ride camera, located in the tunnel. In addition, when the ride opened, it passed next to a waterfall with a mist.

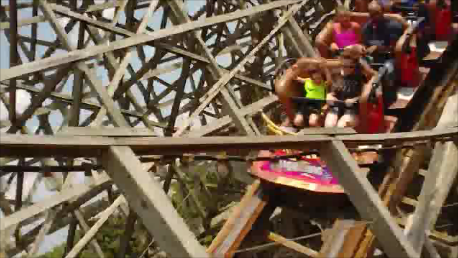
A view of the Lightning train from the Thunder train during a pass.

== Critical reception ==
Steve Hendrix of The Washington Post wrote that Lightning Racer "looks like something left behind by a flood, but the twin coasters race each other through the tangle with thrilling zippiness". Conversely, Jane Holahan of the Lancaster New Era wrote: "I liked to be terrified when I ride a roller coaster. The Lightning Racer simply didn't terrify me."

=== Awards ===
Lightning Racer is consistently voted among the top 25 wooden roller coasters by Amusement Today's Golden Ticket Awards. The first such award was given in August 2001, when the ride was ranked as the 13th best wooden roller coaster in the world.

Golden Ticket Awards: Top wood Roller Coasters
Year									1998	1999
Ranking									–	–
Year	2000	2001	2002	2003	2004	2005	2006	2007	2008	2009
Ranking	–	13	11	7	10	9	10	10	9	12
Year	2010	2011	2012	2013	2014	2015	2016	2017	2018	2019
Ranking	10	11	11	9	11	10	10	12	12	14
Year	2020	2021	2022	2023	2024	2025	2026			
Ranking	N/A	11	14	22	20	29	34 (tie)			
