= Happy Valley Wuhan =

Amusement park in China

- Interactive map of Happy Valley Wuhan
- Location: Wuhan, Hubei, China
- Coordinates: 30.591944°N 114.387222°E
- Status: Operating
- Opened: April 29, 2012

Attractions
- Roller coasters: 5
- Website: wh.happyvalley.cn

Happy Valley Wuhan (simplified Chinese: 武汉欢乐谷; traditional Chinese: 武漢歡樂谷; pinyin: Wǔhàn Huānlè Gǔ) is a theme park in Hongshan District, Wuhan, Hubei Province, China. Opened on 29 April 2012, it is the fifth installation of the Happy Valley theme park chain.

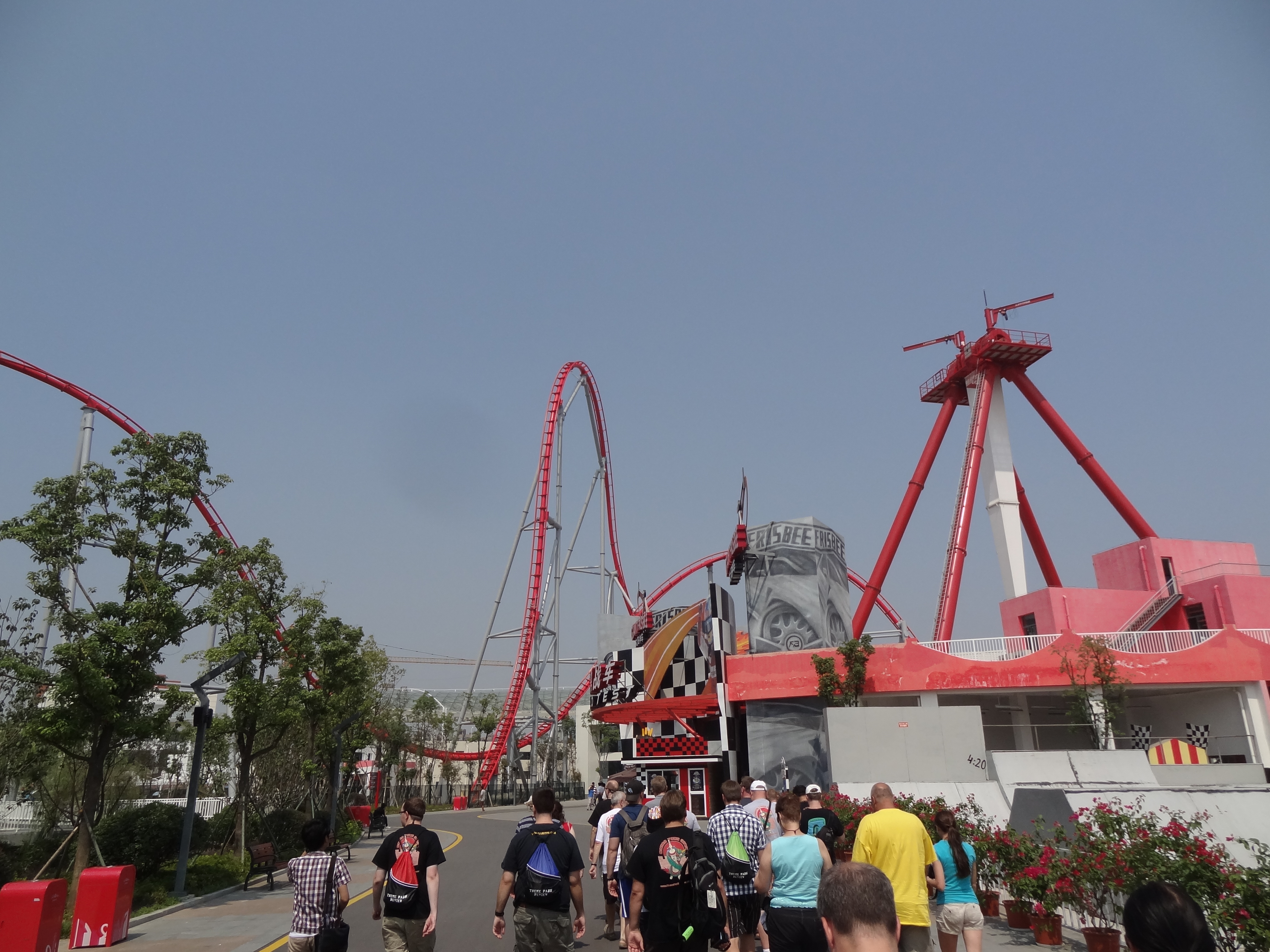
OCT Thrust SSC1000

== Notable rides ==
Name	Type	Manufacturer	Model	Opened	Other statistics
Dauling Dragon	Wood – Racing	Martin & Vleminckx	Wood Coaster	29 April 2012	Length: 3,914.1 and 3,750 ft (1,193.0 and 1,143.0 m), respectively; Height: 105 ft (32 m); Speed: 54.1 mph (87.1 km/h)
Hidden Anaconda	Steel	Maurer Söhne	SkyLoop	29 April 2012	Length: 492.2 ft (150.0 m); Height: 151.6 ft (46.2 m); Inversions: 2; Speed: 65.3 mph (105.1 km/h); Duration: 1:00; G-Force: 5
Crazy Car; Formerly FamilyCo Express	Steel – Launched	Maurer Söhne	X-Car	29 April 2012	Length: 1,036.8 ft (316.0 m); Height: 49.3 ft (15.0 m); Inversions: 2; Speed: 43.5 mph (70.0 km/h); Duration: 0:47; G-Force: 4.3
Monte Carlo Racetrack	Steel	Golden Horse	Mine Train	29 April 2012	Unknown
OCT Thrust SSC1000	Steel – Launched	S&S Worldwide	Air-Launched Coaster	1 October 2012	Height: 196.8 ft (60.0 m); Drop: 221.2 ft (67.4 m); Speed: 83 mph (134 km/h); G-Force: 4.5
