= Montreal Aquarium =

Defunct public aquarium in Canada

Coordinates: 45°31′19.02″N 73°32′14.56″W

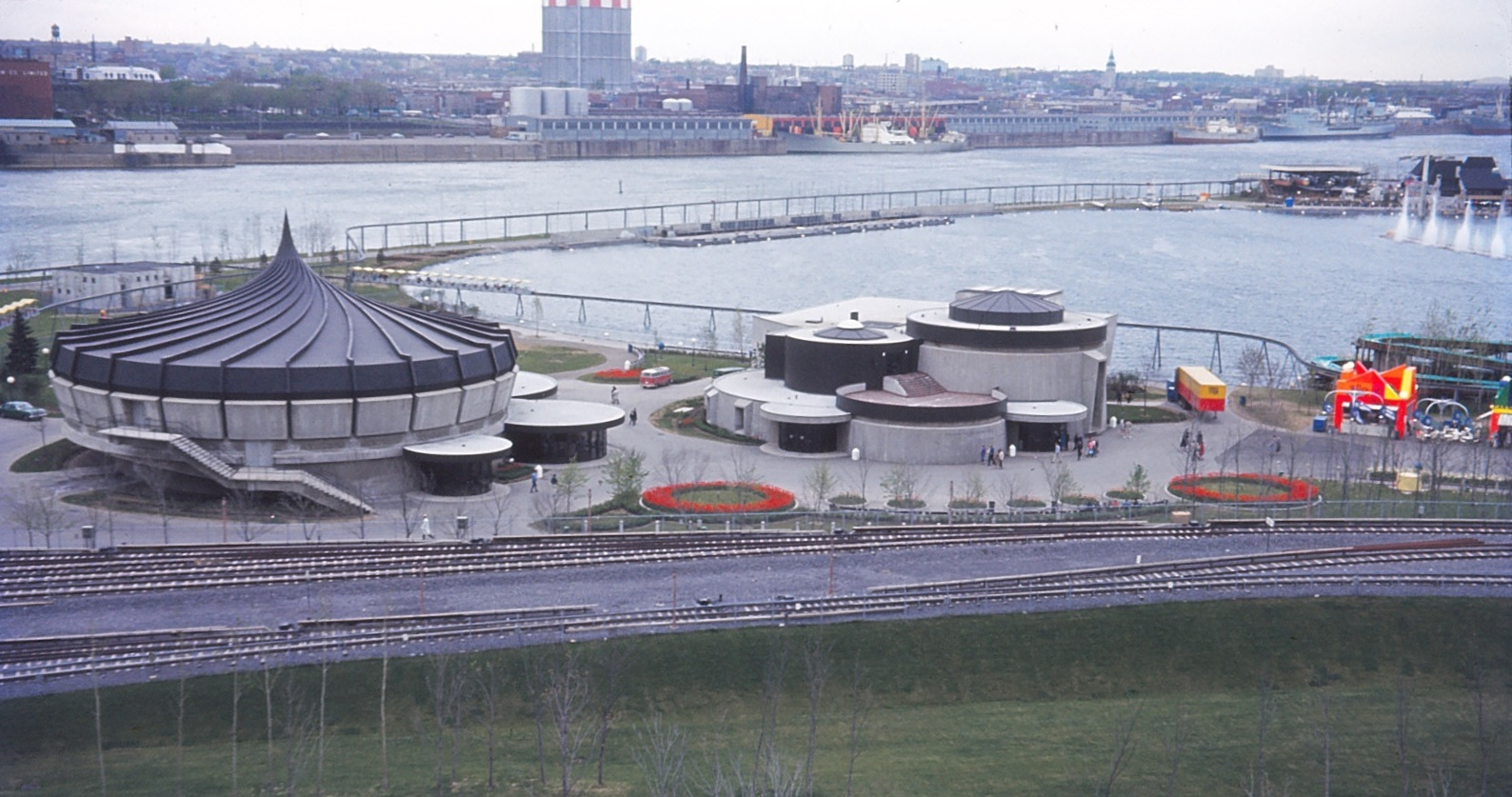
The Montreal Aquarium in 1967 (Alcan Pavilion buildings: Marine Circus & Main Aquarium)

The Montreal Aquarium, also known as the Alcan Aquarium, was a public aquarium on St. Helen's Island, in Montreal, Quebec, Canada. Built for the 1967 World's Fair (Expo 67), the two-building site operated for nearly a quarter of a century in La Ronde before shutting down in 1991. The main aquarium building was demolished in 1997, but the pool building still remains. Apart from a brief re-purposing as a video game centre, it has been vacant ever since.

== History ==
=== Montreal Aquadome (1967–1991) ===
The Expo pavilion was originally sponsored by Alcan Aluminum Ltd., who built the site as a joint venture with the City of Montreal and the Zoological Society of Montreal. The two buildings that made up the site were known as the Alcan Pavilion. The main aquarium building featured penguin pools, exhibits space and a gift shop. The separate dolphin pool building, the Alcan Marine Circus, had a 900-seat auditorium, show pool and holding tanks.

The city planned in 1988 to move the aquarium to a more popular location at the Old Port, but the plan did not come through when the city was mired in recession in the early 1990s.

On September 15, 1991, the aquarium officially closed. Most of its exhibits were transferred to the Biodome.

The main aquarium building was demolished, leaving just the former dolphin pool building.

=== Animal abuse incidents ===
In February 1980, blue-collar workers enacted a 41-day workers' strike, refusing to enter the aquarium to feed or care for its dolphins. Abandoned by their trainers, and left to starve in isolation, 3 dolphins died as a result of the neglect. The surviving dolphins were sold to Flipper's Sea School, a roadside dolphin attraction in Florida. The already failing aquarium received even more negative publicity, and Montreal lost its right to care for any dolphins in captivity going forward, an international embarrassment for the city.

After its closure in 1991, even further negativity came about for the city and in larger part the province of Quebec, when the media discovered the aquarium, unable to sell its sharks, made a decision to kill them off (in one failed kill attempt, a sledgehammer was used to finish off the shark).

=== Nintendo Mégadôme (1995–2006) ===
The Nintendo Mégadôme opened inside the former aquarium pool space in 1995. Operating for over a decade, it was a Nintendo-sponsored video game centre with the then-latest Nintendo video games and attractions. It closed in 2006. The former dolphin pool building it occupied now belongs to La Ronde, and today remains vacant and closed off from the public. The very small segment corner that remains of the main aquarium building (formerly used as a food concessions stand) is now used as a Pass Building: "Zone Groupes - Route 67".
