= Dauling Dragon =

Racing roller coaster in Wuhan, China

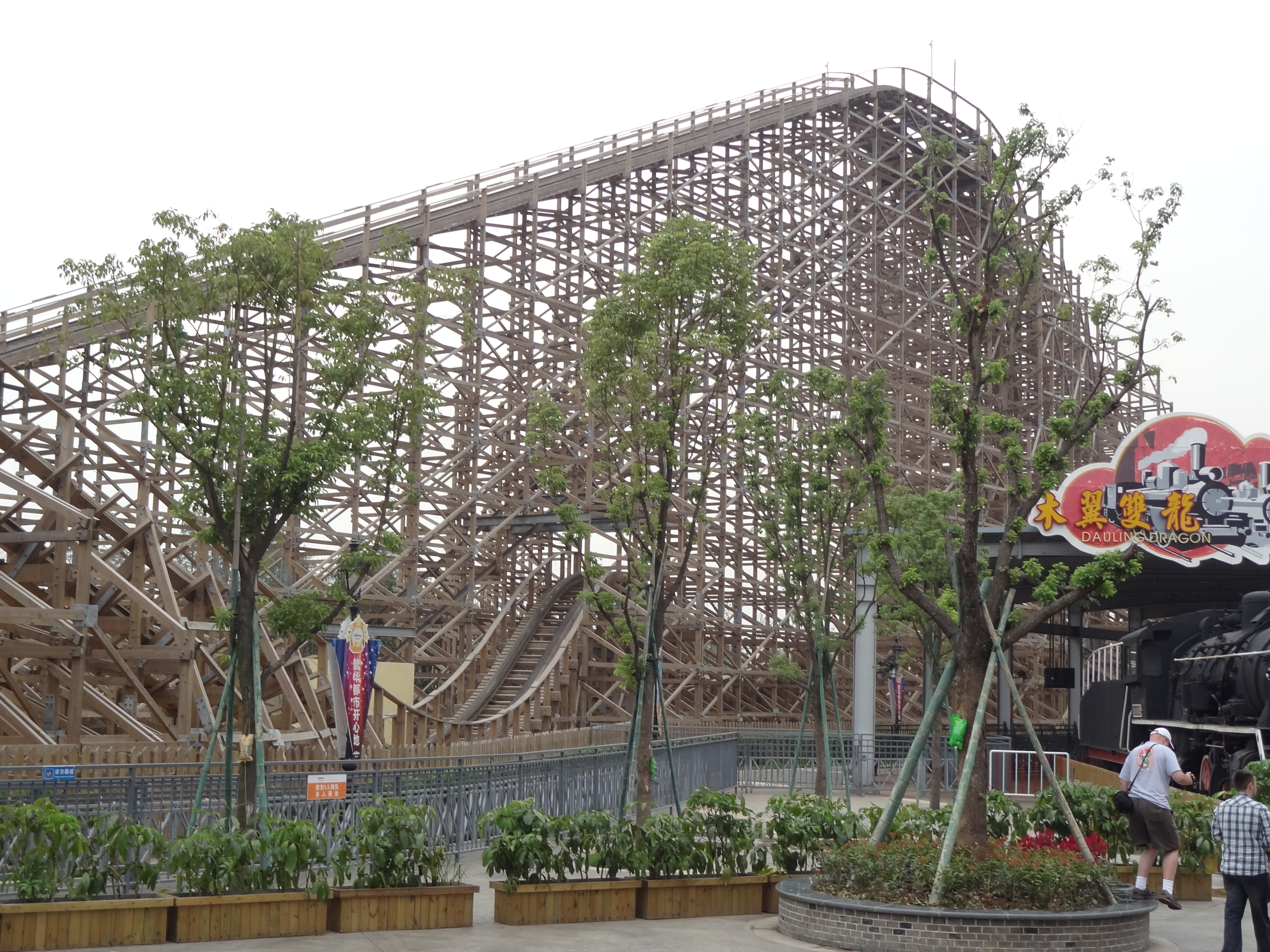

Happy Valley
- Coordinates: 30.591230°N 114.387885°E
- Status: Operating
- Opening date: April 29, 2012

General statistics
- Type: Wood – Racing
- Manufacturer: Martin & Vleminckx
- Designer: The Gravity Group
- Lift/launch system: Chain lift hill
Height	105 ft (32.0 m)	105 ft (32.0 m)
Drop	101.8 ft (31.0 m)	101.8 ft (31.0 m)
Length	3,651.6 ft (1,113.0 m)	3,690.9 ft (1,125.0 m)
Speed	54.1 mph (87.1 km/h)	54.1 mph (87.1 km/h)
Inversions	0	0
Max vertical angle	56°	57°
- Trains: 4 trains with 6 cars. Riders are arranged 2 across in 2 rows for a total of 24 riders per train.
- Dauling Dragon at RCDB; Pictures of Dauling Dragon at RCDB

Dauling Dragon (Chinese: 木翼双龙) is a wooden roller coaster located at Happy Valley in Wuhan, Hubei, China. It is China's third wooden roller coaster and its first racing roller coaster. Although billed as a racing coaster, it contains elements that make it similar to dueling coasters, such as racing portions, head-on collision turn-arounds, and sections where the tracks weave around each other.

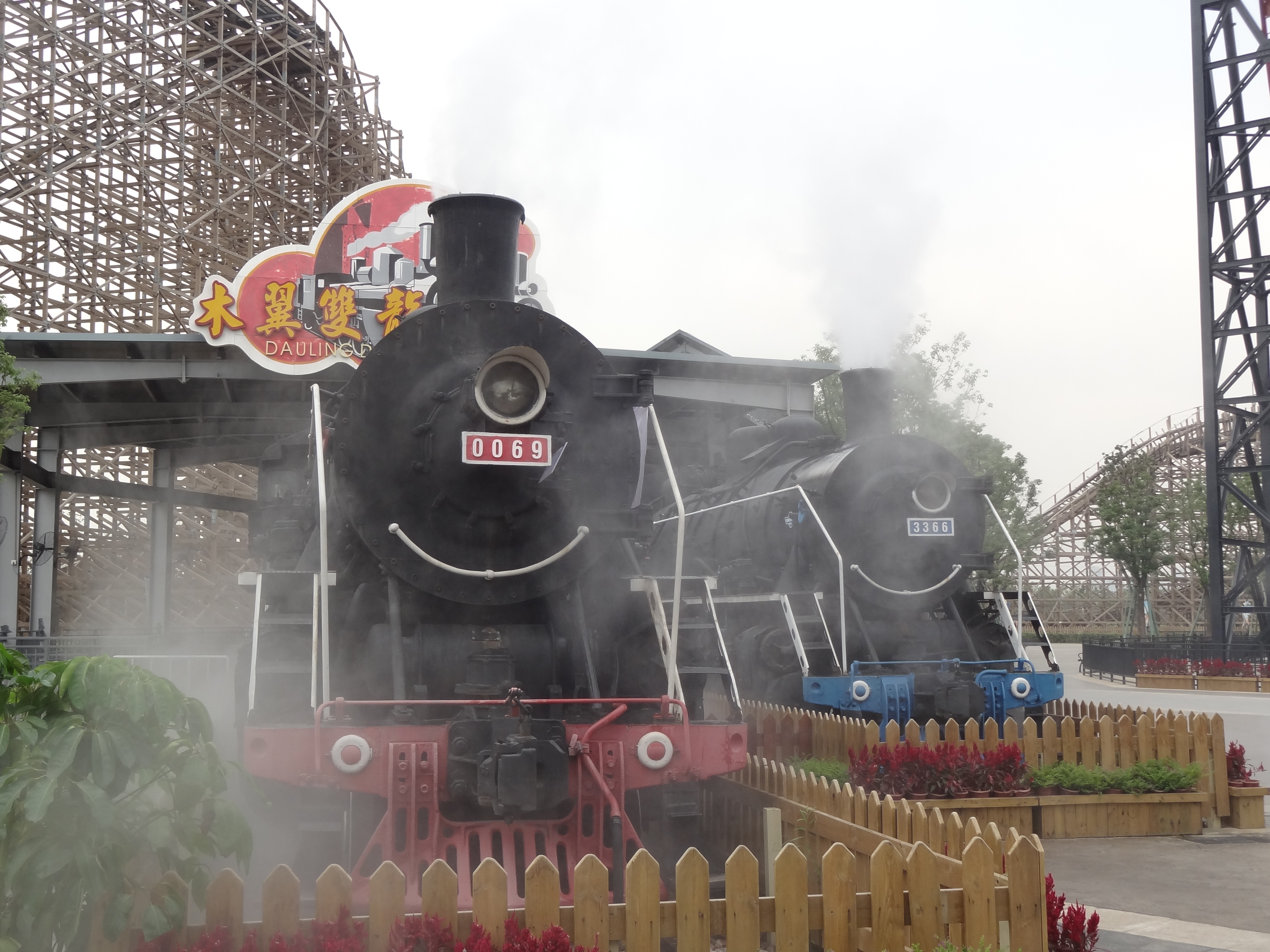
The two SY steam locomotives that mark the entrance to the ride

Dauling Dragon is famous for its iconic "high five" section, in which at the top of a hill each track banks to 90 degrees towards the other track in such a fashion that riders could appear to reach up and high five riders in the other train, although the trains are too far away for actual contact to be made. This has earned Dauling Dragon the nickname "High Five Coaster".

== Awards ==
Mitch Hawker's Best Roller Coaster Poll: Best Wooden-Tracked Roller Coaster
Year	2012
Left Track	8
Right Track	9
