= Super Manège =

Defunct roller coaster at La Ronde

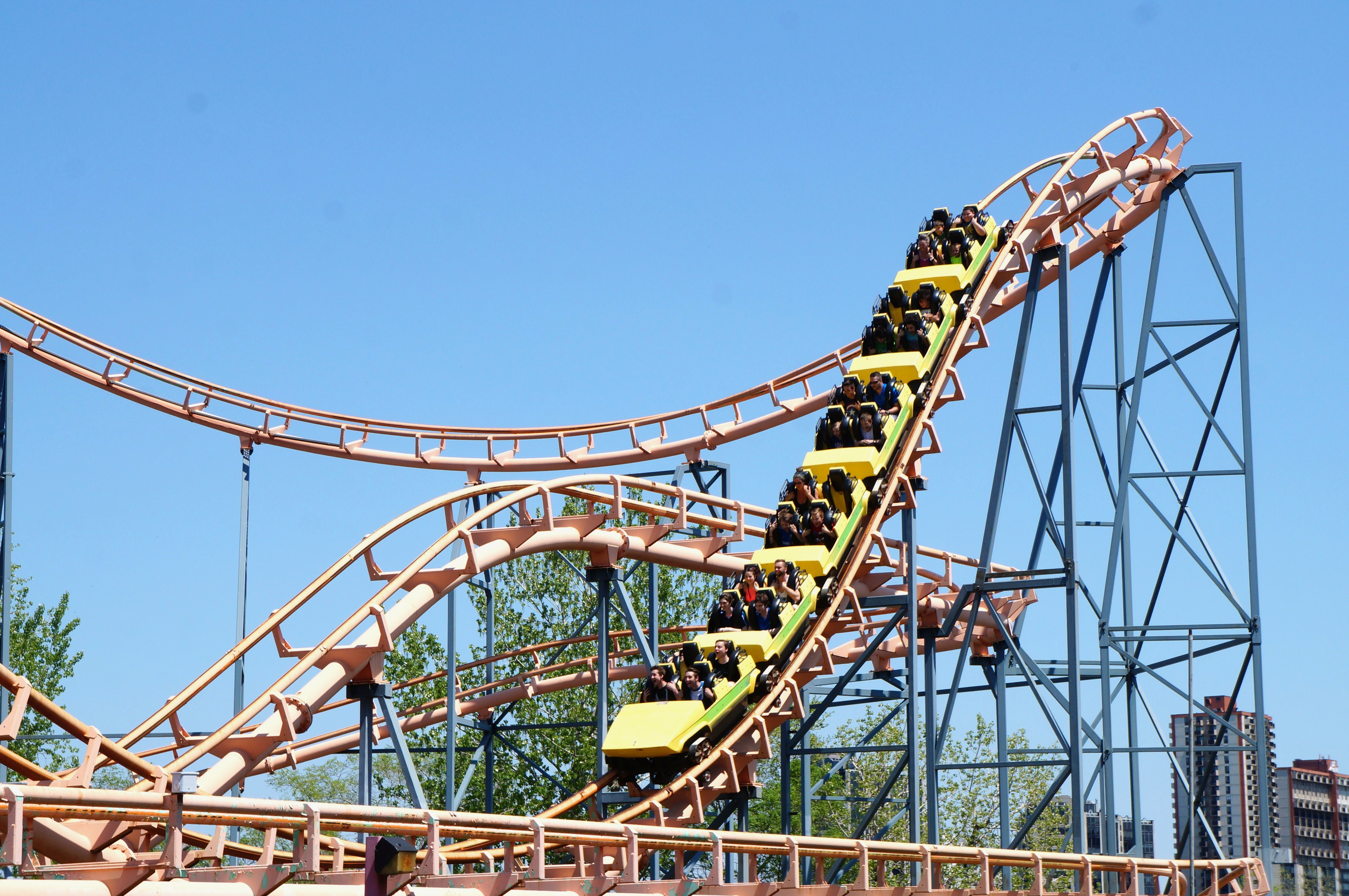

La Ronde
- Location: La Ronde
- Coordinates: 45.523790°N 73.532505°W
- Status: Removed
- Opening date: 1981
- Closing date: August 25, 2019

General statistics
- Type: Steel
- Manufacturer: Vekoma
- Model: Corkscrew with Bayerncurve
- Lift/launch system: Chain
- Height: 23 m (75 ft)
- Drop: 21 m (69 ft)
- Length: 731.52 m (2,400.0 ft)
- Speed: 64 km/h (40 mph)
- Inversions: 2
- Height restriction: 52 in (132 cm)
- Trains: 2 trains with 6 cars. Riders are arranged 2 across in 2 rows for a total of 24 riders per train.
- Flash Pass Available
- Super Manège at RCDB

Super Manège was a steel roller coaster at La Ronde in Montreal, Quebec, Canada. It was built in 1981 by Vekoma as the park's first inverting roller coaster. The ride was located between Le Monstre, Le Boomerang, and close to the Manitou. The Splash ride's entrance was across the pathway from the entrance of Le Super Manege.

== History ==
The ride originally opened as "Corkscrew". It was renamed "Le Super Manège", meaning "The Super Ride".

The ride ended operation on August 25, 2019, and was slated to be replaced with an Intamin Zac Spin coaster called "Vipère". This plan was scrapped in 2022 when the park announced the cancellation of Vipère's installation.

== Ride experience ==
The ride started by climbing to a height of 75 feet (23 m). After a small drop and a curve, riders were taken down a steep 68-foot-tall (21 m) drop and a smaller hill. They then experienced two corkscrew inversions. The coaster then went into several high-speed turns and helices, followed by the final brake run and a curve into the station.
