= La Pitoune =

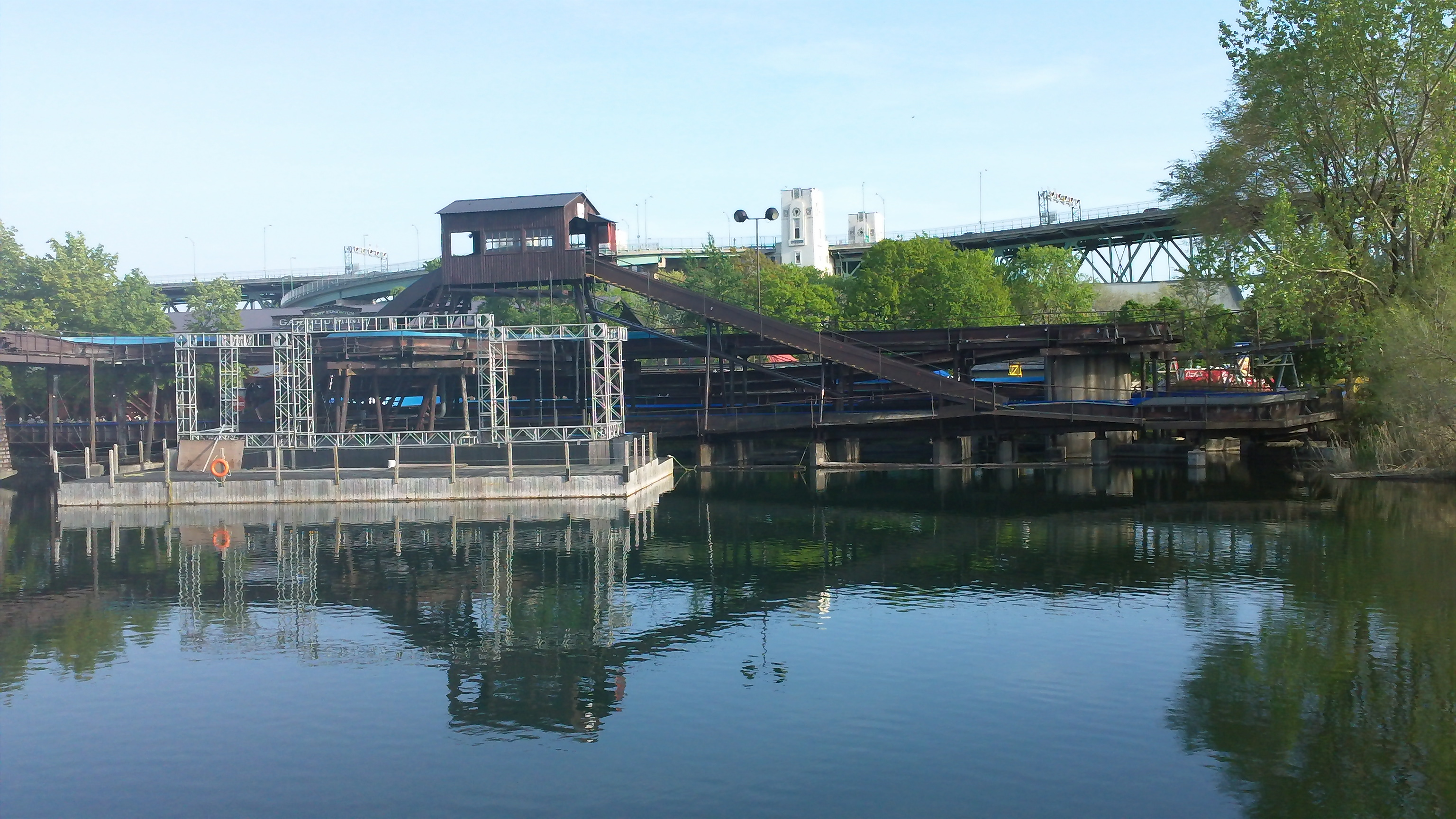

La Ronde (amusement park)
- Area: Fort Edmonton
- Status: Removed
- Opening date: 1967
- Closing date: 2017

General statistics
- Type: Log flume
- Manufacturer: Arrow Dynamics
- Lift system: 2 conveyor belt lift hills
- Boats: Several boats. Riders are arranged 1 across in 4 rows for a total of 4 riders per boat.
- Restraint style: None
- Height restriction: 36 in (91 cm)

La Pitoune was a log flume ride at the Montreal's La Ronde amusement park. Its final year of operation was during the 2016 season.

== History ==
La Pitoune opened the same year as La Ronde, in 1967, and operated for 50 seasons. In May 2017, on what would have been its 50th anniversary, Six Flags announced the ride had reached the end of its useful life and would not reopen. During its final season in 2016, it was one of the original rides of La Ronde still operating. Only 5 original rides remain, with 3 still in operation: Joyeux Moussaillons, La Marche du Mille Pattes (previously Petites Montagnes Russes), Le Galopant (Note: retired 2019; remains on site), La Spirale (Note: retired 2018; structure remains).

Six Flags has not yet announced what will replace the ride. In 2018, most of La Pitoune was dismantled.

== Ride experience ==
After a first 180 degrees turn, riders entered a conveyor belt. At the end, riders followed the flume, which brought them back to almost ground level during a series of gentle falls and turns, and after another conveyor belt, riders ended their ride with the last chute. The ride was themed around the chasse-galerie, a popular French-Canadian tale.
