= Le Vampire =

Inverted roller coaster at La Ronde

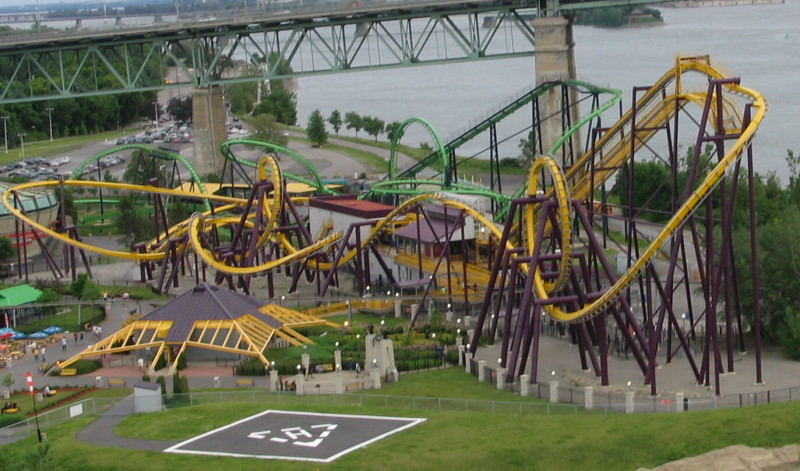
- Le Vampire (yellow) with the Cobra (green) in the background.

La Ronde
- Location: La Ronde
- Coordinates: 45.522521°N 73.538080°W
- Status: Operating
- Opening date: May 18, 2002

General statistics
- Type: Steel – Inverted
- Manufacturer: Bolliger & Mabillard
- Model: Inverted Coaster / Batman
- Lift/launch system: Chain lift hill
- Height: 105 ft (32 m)
- Length: 2,700.2 ft (823.0 m)
- Speed: 50 mph (80 km/h)
- Inversions: 5
- Duration: 1:13 minutes
- Capacity: 1400 riders per hour
- G-force: 4
- Height restriction: 54 in (137 cm)
- Trains: 2 trains with 7 cars. Riders are arranged 4 across in a single row for a total of 28 riders per train.
- Accés Rapide available
- Le Vampire at RCDB

Le Vampire (English: The Vampire) is an inverted roller coaster at La Ronde amusement park in Montreal, Quebec, Canada, designed by the Swiss firm Bolliger & Mabillard (B&M). Its track is identical to Batman: The Ride, but the roller coaster has no association to the Batman franchise and was given an unrelated name and a slightly different cosmetic appearance.

== Ride experience ==
The track is 823 metres in length and reaches a height of nearly 32 metres. Riders sit with their legs dangling such as on a ski chairlift and reach speeds of up to 80.5 km/hour and loop head-over-heels five times. The Vampire can carry up to 1,400 riders per hour.

== History ==
Le Vampire was constructed by Martin & Vleminckx.

The ride was closed due to an accident on July 6, 2012. It opened for the first time since the incident on August 13, 2012. On September 3, 2015, the park announced that the ride would run backwards for a limited time during the 2016 season and become part of a new section of the park.

== See also ==
- Incidents at La Ronde
- Batman: The Ride
