= Guangzhou Sunac Land Resort =

Theme park in Guangzhou, China

Guangzhou Sunac Land Resort (Chinese: 广州融创文旅城) is a theme park in Huadu District, Guangzhou, China. It is north of the city center of Huadu and covers a total area of approximately 2.2 million square meters. It was designed and built by Wanda Group, but was sold to Sunac in 2017. In June 2019, the Sunac Land Resort opened officially.

Guangzhou Sunac Land Resort consists of:

- Guangzhou Sunac Land
- Guangzhou Sunac Snow Park
- Guangzhou Sunac Water Park
- Guangzhou Sunac Sport Park
