= La Ronde (amusement park) =

Amusement park in Montreal, Quebec

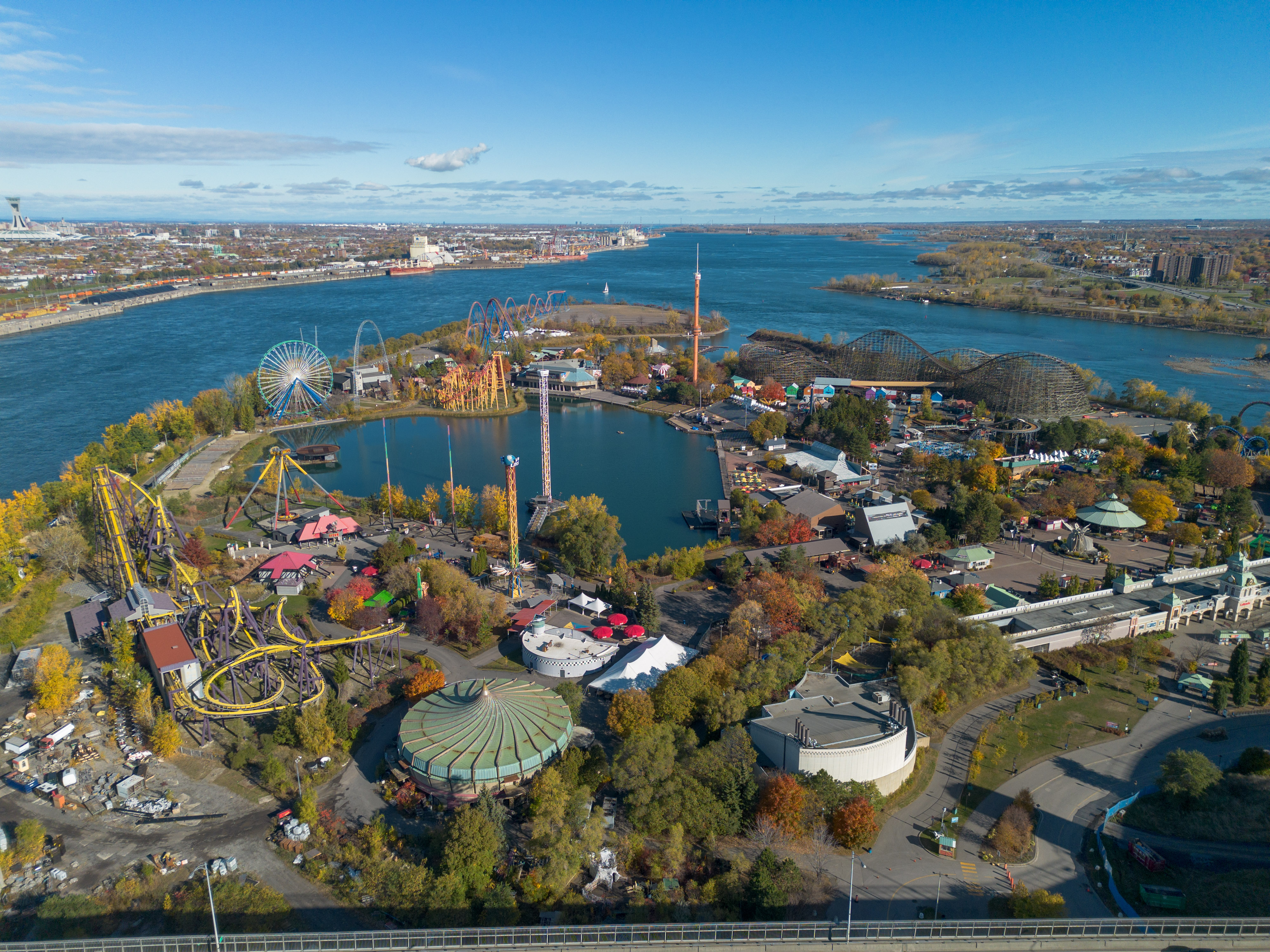
- La Ronde in 2025
- Interactive map of La Ronde
- Location: Montreal, Quebec, Canada
- Coordinates: 45°31′21″N 73°32′06″W
- Status: Operating
- Public transit: Jean-Drapeau; 767 Jean-Drapeau 769 Papineau
- Opened: April 1967; 59 years ago
- Owner: EPR Properties; City of Montreal (lessor)
- Operated by: Premier Parks, LLC
- Operating season: May–October
- Area: 59 hectares (146 acres)

Attractions
- Total: 37
- Roller coasters: 8
- Website: Official website

La Ronde (lit. 'The Round') is an amusement park in Montreal, Quebec, Canada. It was originally built as the entertainment complex for Expo 67, the 1967 world's fair. Today, it is operated by Premier Parks, LLC and owned by EPR Properties, under a pending emphyteutic lease with the City of Montreal (previously until 2065 under former owner Six Flags). La Ronde is the largest amusement park in Quebec and the second-largest in Canada, behind Canada's Wonderland.

La Ronde occupies 59 hectares (146 acres) of the northern tip of Saint Helen's Island, situated on a man-made extension to the landmass; the park is in the vicinity of where the smaller, adjacent Ronde Island had once been—the origin of the park's name. The park hosts the annual Montreal Fireworks Festival, an international fireworks competition.

== Grounds ==
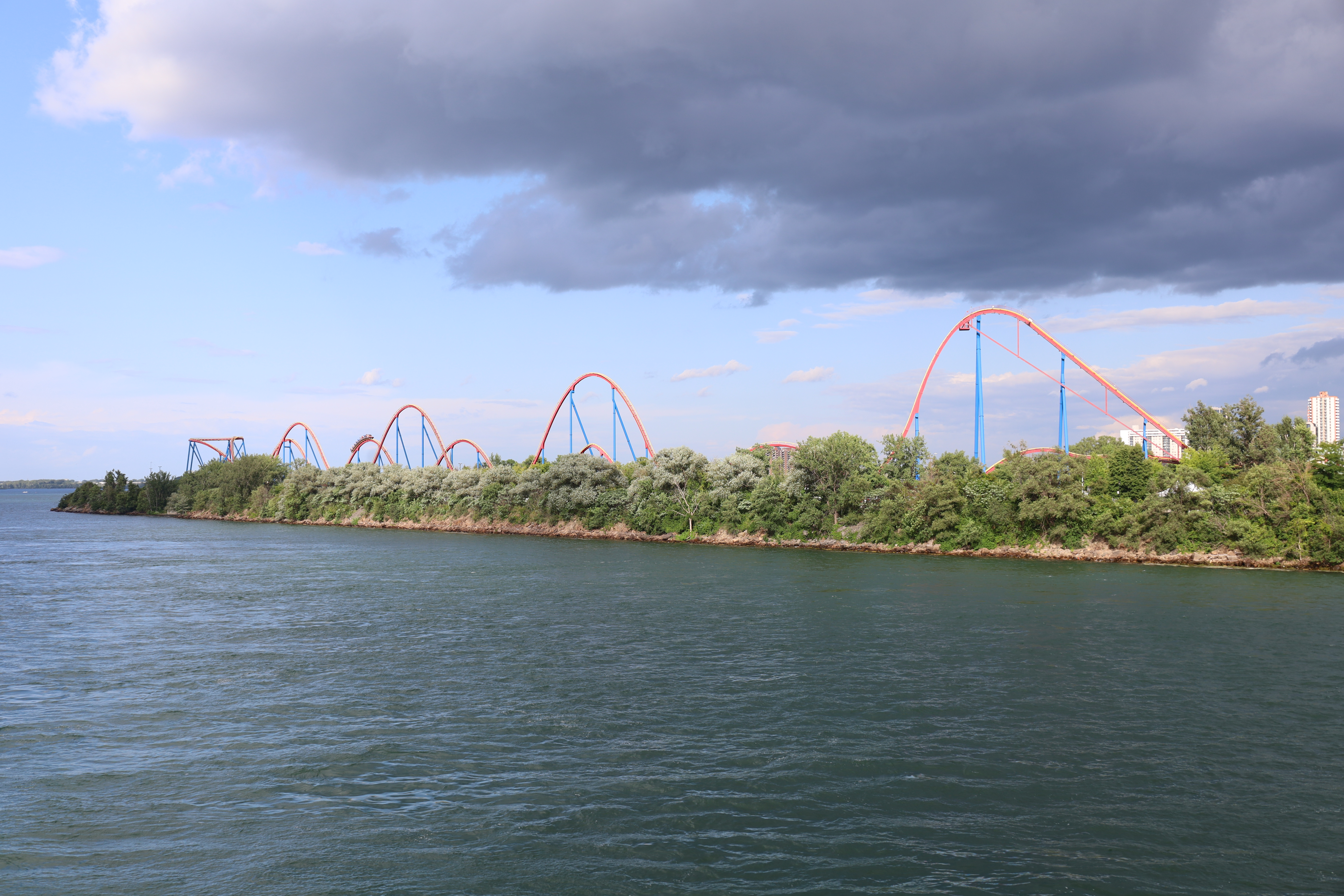
View from the St. Lawrence River in 2023

The Montreal region park is located within the St. Lawrence River on Saint Helen's Island, situated atop a man-made extension on its northern tip where the small (water-enclosed) Ronde Island had once been. The former granite Ronde island, which the extension was made around, was destroyed by blasting and the resulting crater it left turned into Dolphin lake, which the park surrounds. South of the amusement park is Jean-Drapeau Park, an urban park and former grounds of Expo 68, as well as the Jean-Drapeau Metro station and Montreal Biosphere museum.

Access to the park from Montreal and the South Shore is primarily served by the Jacque Cartier Bridge, or alternatively through Cité du Havre via the Concordia bridge at the island's opposite end. Public transit provides accessibility by means of the island's Metro station, with weekend summer-only shuttle bus service to the park.

The amusement park opens to the public from mid-May to late October (with peak season in July). La Ronde closes for the season in the last weekend of October.

== History ==
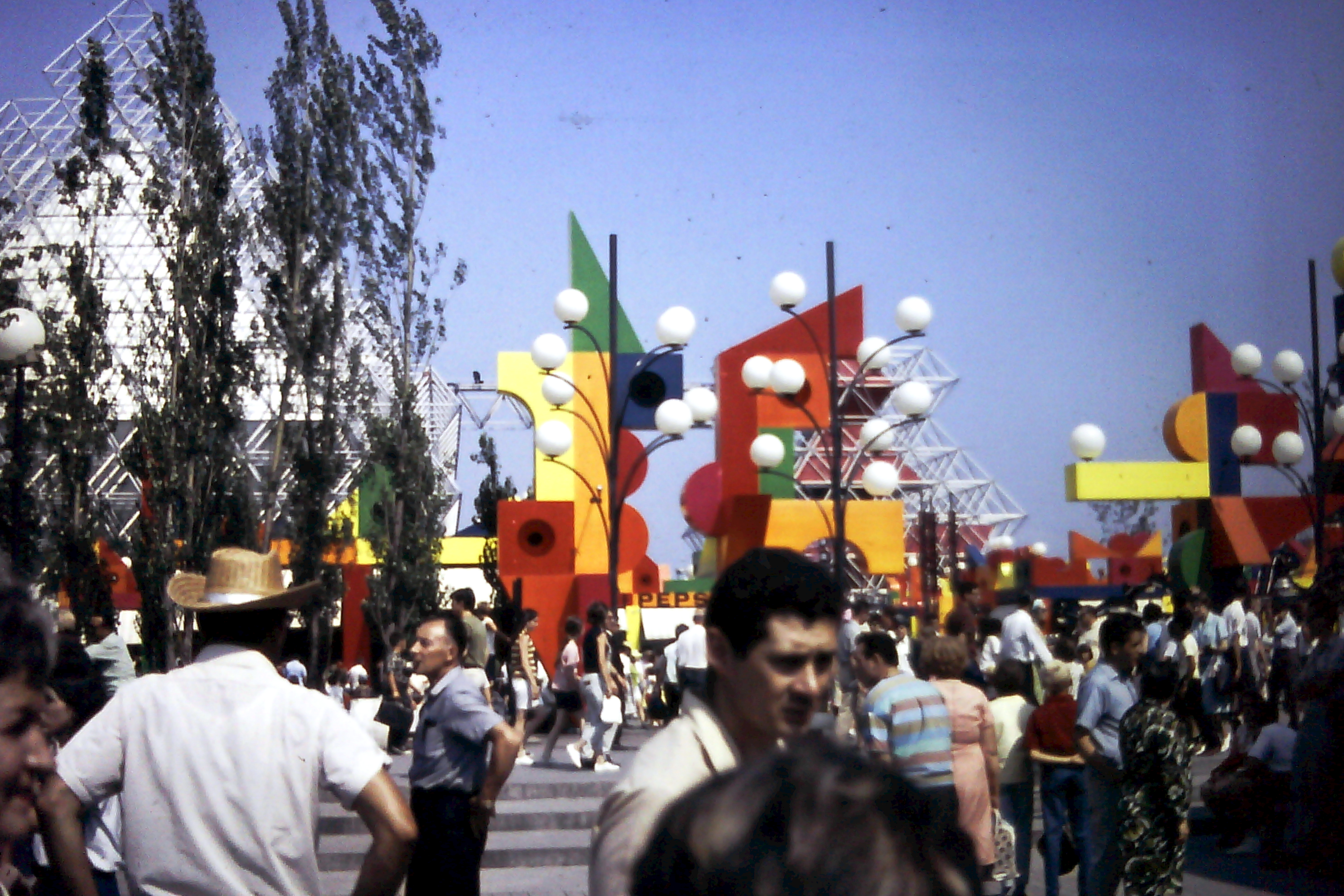
La Ronde during Expo 67. The amusement park was built as an entertainment complex for the world's fair.

In 1967, La Ronde was built as the entertainment complex for Expo 67, the world fair held in Montreal from April 28 to October 29, 1967. The exposition was located on 400 hectares (990 acres) of man-made islands in the St Lawrence River adjacent to Montreal, and comprised six "theme" pavilions, 48 national pavilions, four provincial pavilions, 27 private-industry and institutional pavilions, and La Ronde – a 54 ha (130 acres) entertainment complex with theatres, midway attractions, drinking and dining. The rides, restaurants and beer halls of La Ronde remained open until 2:30 a.m. nightly, after the rest of the Expo site closed down at 10:30 p.m. After Expo 67 World's Fair, the City of Montreal continued to run the amusement park for the next 34 years.

In 1973, on July 8, the drowning deaths of two police officers occurred at La Ronde's Dolphin Lake, after the officers attempted to aid an intoxicated woman who had fallen into the water that night.

In 1973, in October, the rapid transit train system that served La Ronde, the Expo Express, permanently closed. Its terminus station sat right above La Ronde's main entrance, and brought off-island visitors directly to the park during Expo 67 and the early days of Man and His World. Although the transit system has long since been demolished, La Ronde's main entrance is built around the former train station, and an (abandoned) train bridge still sits in the St Lawrence river to the east of the park.

In 1979, on July 8, the drowning deaths of three people occurred at La Ronde's Dolphin Lake when "The Mississippi" tour boat, ferrying up to 60 passengers, capsized. Two weeks later, on July 22, a fourth drowning death occurred when a man attempted a swim across Dolphin Lake late at night after the park had closed.

In 1980, blue-collar workers at La Ronde's Alcan Aquarium enacted a 41-day strike, refusing to enter the aquarium to feed or care for its dolphins. Abandoned by their trainers, and left to starve in isolation, 3 dolphins died as a result of the neglect. Never recovering from the negativity surrounding the tragic event, the aquarium permanently closed in 1991.

In 1992, the amusement park was used as a backdrop in the Are You Afraid of the Dark? episode "Laughing in the Dark" (season 1, episode 2) and was given the fictional name "Playland". The episode featured the park's giant roller coaster, haunted house with a dragon on the front and its old-fashioned carousel.

In 2001, the City of Montreal sold La Ronde to Six Flags, an American theme park chain, in a deal completed on May 4, 2001. Six Flags acquired all of the assets of the park for $20 million USD and had a long-term contract to lease the land from the city. Before the announcement of the Six Flags purchase, the city had considered offers from other bidders including Paramount Parks, Cedar Fair, and Parc Astérix. Over a 25 year period, Six Flags had invested around $90 million in new rides and improvements, such as Le Vampire, Splash, Le Goliath and Ednör – L'Attaque as well as a new main entrance.

In 2007, La Ronde celebrated its 40th anniversary with Expo 67 themed events commemorating the world fair.

In 2012, a man was struck and killed by "The Vampire" roller-coaster after entering a restricted zone while the ride was operating.

In 2020, after a three-month delay due to the COVID-19 pandemic, La Ronde opened belatedly for its 54th operating season. It closed early for the season too due to the ongoing pandemic. Only a limited number of rides were open during its unprecedented two-month season that only ran from August 3 to October 3, 2020.

On March 5, 2026, it was announced that EPR Properties would acquire La Ronde, as part of a purchase of seven park properties from Six Flags at a combined cost of US$331 million. It was stated it would be managed by La Round Operations, a company owned by Premier Parks, LLC CEO and founder Kieran Burke.The city of Montreal is planning to re-negotiate its lease agreement with EPR. The official transfer of the park operations to La Ronde Operations, took place on May 14, 2026.

== Attractions ==
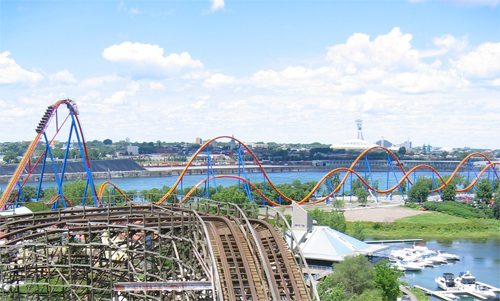
Goliath is one of eight roller coasters at the park. The park's wooden roller coaster, Le Monstre is visible in the foreground.

La Ronde holds a number of attractions including live shows and amusement rides. As of 2025, the amusement park had 37 amusement rides including eight roller coasters. One of the park's roller coasters, Le Monstre (lit. 'The Monster'), a 40-metre (131 ft) wooden coaster, holds the record for highest double-tracked roller coaster in the world. During the month of October, the park hosts an annual Fright Fest to celebrate Halloween. The festival has four haunted houses, and many costumed performers who walk around the park. Park admission is free for toddlers under the age of two, accompanied by an adult.

=== Roller coasters ===
Name	Ride manufacturer	Year opened	Type or model	Thrill level (Note: As described by the park)	Ref(s)
Boomerang	Vekoma	1984	Shuttle roller coaster	Maximum	
Dragon	Intamin	1994	Indoor roller coaster	Moderate	
Ednör – L'Attaque	Vekoma	2010	Suspended Looping Coaster	Maximum	
Goliath	Bolliger & Mabillard	2006	Out and back roller coaster	Maximum	
Monstre, Le	William Cobb & Associates	1985	Dual-tracked wooden roller coaster	Maximum	
Toboggan Nordique	Zamperla	2003	Wild Mouse roller coaster	Moderate	
Vampire, Le	Bolliger & Mabillard	2002	Inverted roller coaster	Maximum	

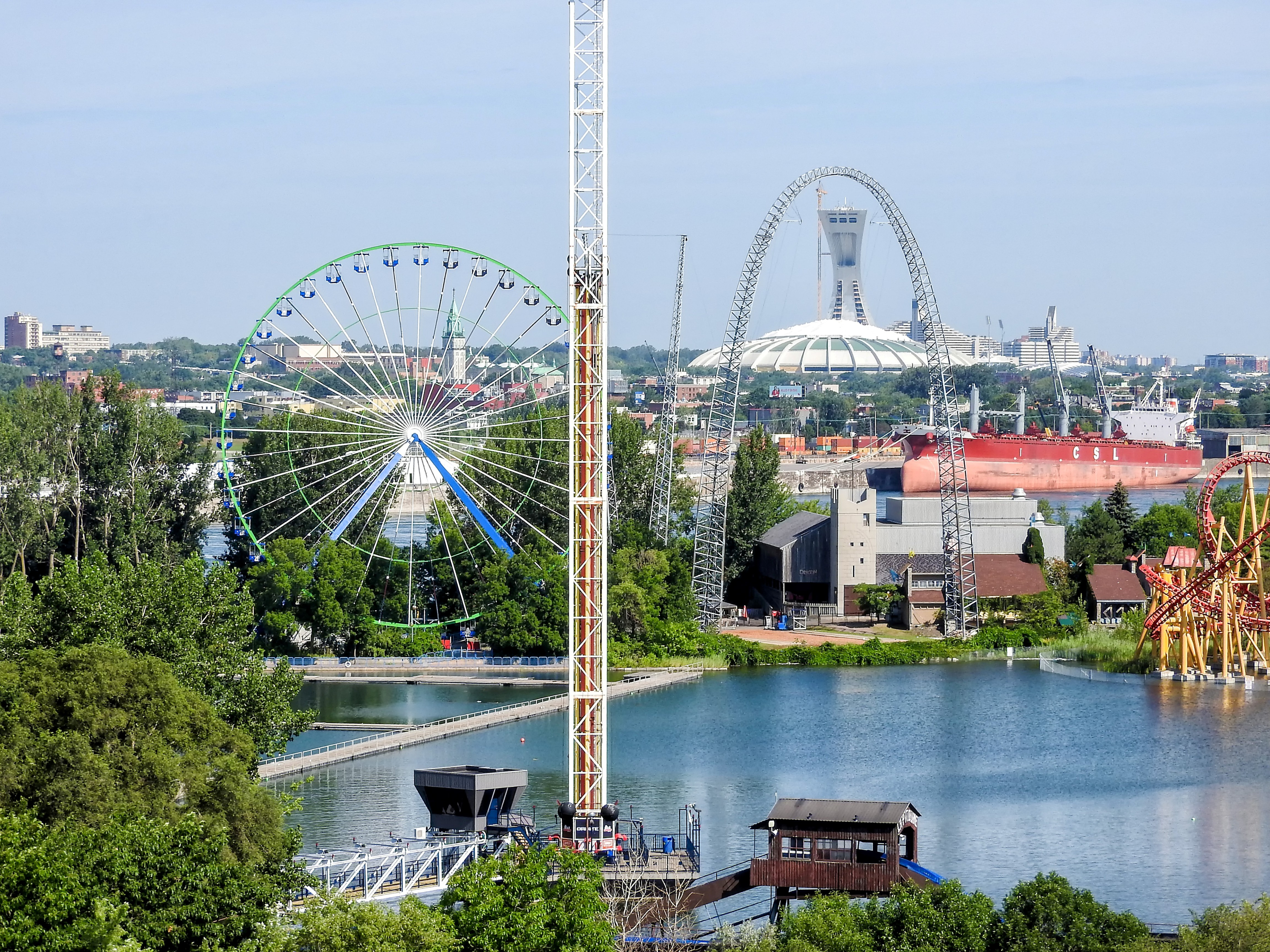
Several amusement rides around Dolphin Lake, a body of water at La Ronde

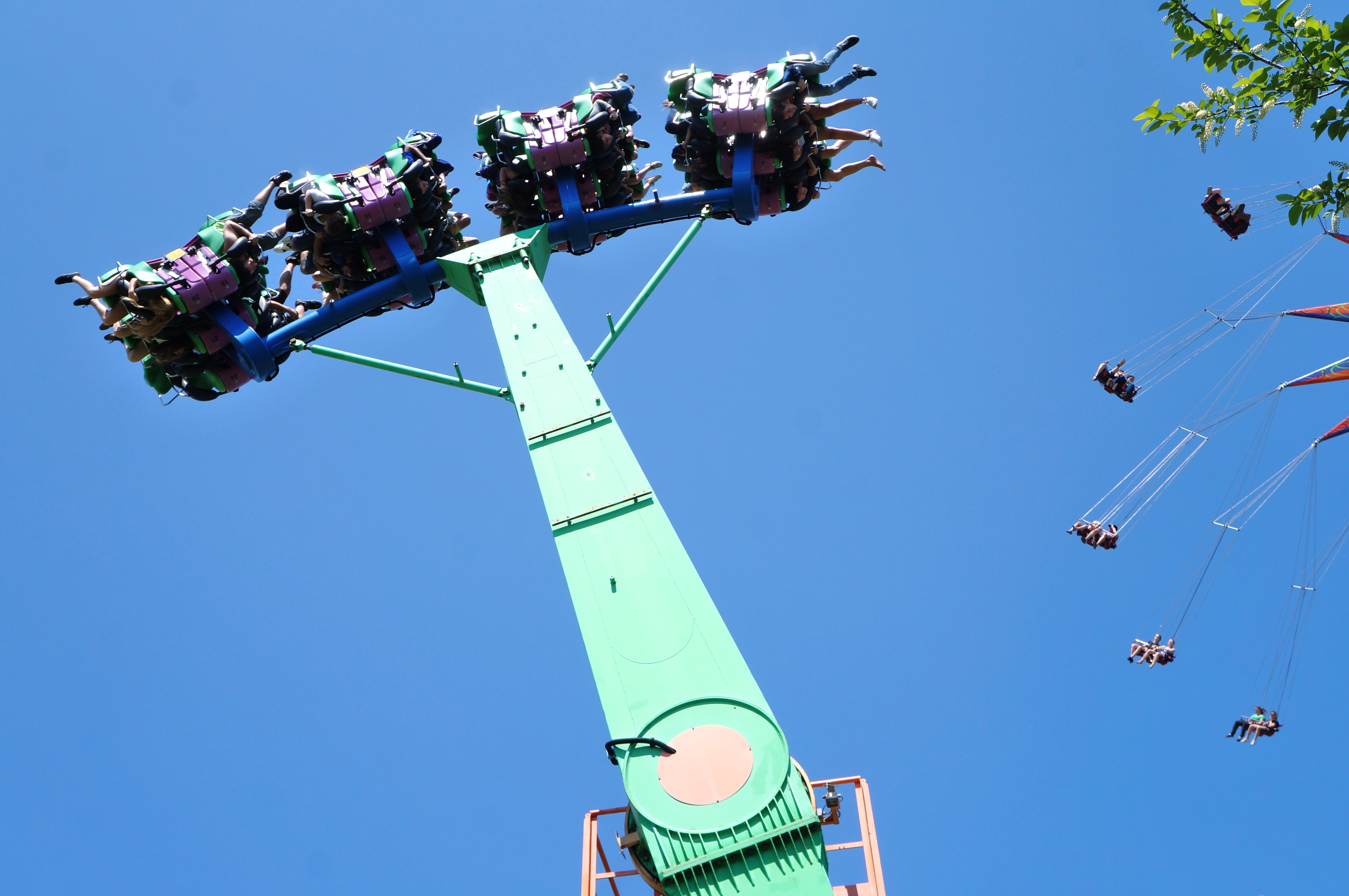
The Vertigo amusement ride in motion. Guests riding Vol Ultime is visible in the background

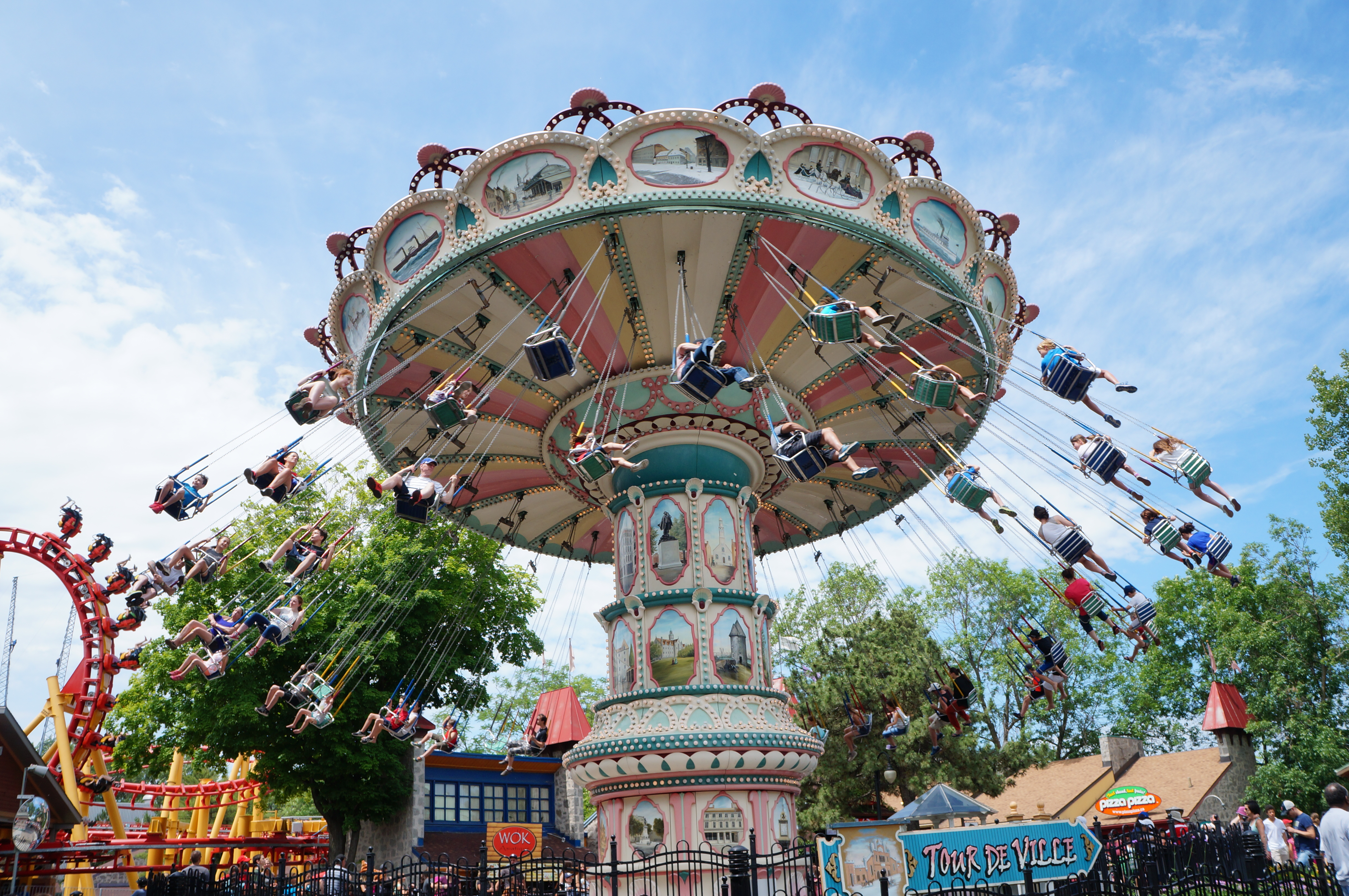
Tour de Ville is a swing ride at La Ronde

=== Flat and thrill rides ===
Name	Ride manufacturer	Year opened	Type or model	Thrill level	Ref(s)
Aqua Twist	Mack Rides	2013	Twist 'n' Splash teacups	Moderate	
Autos Tamponneuses	RDC Bumper Cars	2003	Bumper cars	Moderate	
Bateau Pirate	HUSS Park Attractions	1988	Pirate ship	Maximum	
Catapulte (Note: Use of the following attraction is not included in the park's admission fee, and requires an additional fee for guests to use.)	Ride Entertainment Group	2008	Skycoaster	Maximum	
Chaos	Larson International	2019	Fire Ball	Maximum	
Condor	HUSS Park Attractions	1990	Condor	Moderate	
Disco Ronde	HUSS Park Attractions	1986	Breakdance	Moderate	
Démon	Mondial	2014	Top Spin	Maximum	
Grand Carrousel	Chance Morgan	2003	Carousel	Mild	
Grande Roue	Vekoma	1984	Ferris wheel	Mild	
Manitou	Zamperla	2003	Nitro	Maximum	
Orbite	S&S – Sansei Technologies	1999	Space Shot	Maximum	
Sling Shot		2002	Reverse Bungee	Maximum	
Splash	Intamin	2004	Log flume	Moderate	
Titan	Zamperla	2017	Giant Discovery frisbee	Maximum	
Tour de Ville	Zamperla	2003	Swing ride	Moderate	
Tourbillon	Larson International	2018	Tilt-A-Whirl	Moderate	
Vertigo	Zamperla	2003	Ranger	Maximum	
Vol Ultime	Funtime	2012	Swing ride	Maximum	

=== Children's rides ===
Name	Ride manufacturer	Year opened	Type or model	Thrill level	Ref(s)
Air Papillon	Zamperla	2005	Crazy bus	Mild	
Danse des Bestioles, La	Zamperla	2005	Junior jets	Mild	
Grande Envolée, La	Zamperla	1990	Balloon Race	Moderate	
Explorateurs, Les	Arrow Dynamics	1967	Rub-A-Dub ride	Mild	
Marais Enchanté	Zamperla	2005	Rockin' Tug	Mild	
Marche du Mille-pattes	Arrow Dynamics	1967	Kiddie Coaster	Mild	
Monsieur L'Arbre	Zamperla	2005	Swing ride	Mild	
Ourson Fripon	Zamperla	2005	Kiddie drop tower	Mild	
Phoenix	Larson International	2016	Flying Scooters	Moderate	
Pommes d'Api	Zamperla	2005	Ballon tower	Mild	
Safari, Le	Arrow Dynamics	1967	Train ride	Mild	

== Six Flags changes ==
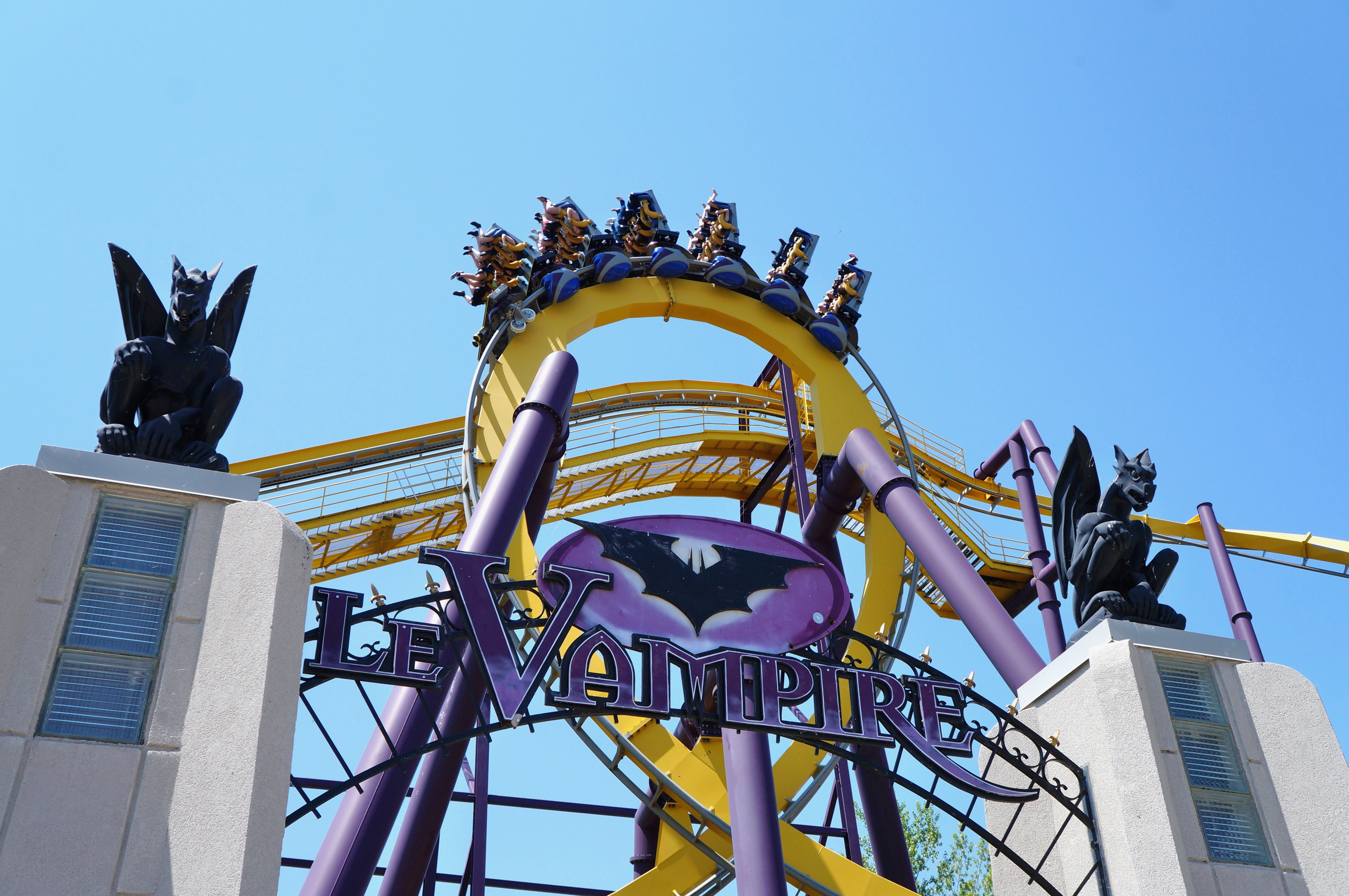
Entrance to Le Vampire, a roller coaster opened at the park in 2002

In May 2002, La Ronde announced the installation of a Bolliger & Mabillard inverted roller coaster called Le Vampire, which was the first major investment by Six Flags. It is a mirror image of the "Batman – The Ride" roller coasters found at many other Six Flags parks.

In 2003, La Ronde opened six new rides including Auto Tamponneuses, Tour de Ville, Manitou, Vertigo, Grand Carrousel, and Toboggan Nordique. Some existing rides were replaced by these new rides.

In 2004, La Ronde opened Le splash (a Shoot the Chute ride) and SpongeBob 3D.

In May 2006, La Ronde opened its ninth roller coaster, Goliath, a 53-metre (174 ft) high Bolliger & Mabillard mega coaster. It reaches speeds of 110 km/h (68 mph), making it the fourth tallest and the fourth fastest roller coaster in Canada.

In 2006, La Ronde permanently closed the Nintendo Megadome, housed in the former Alcan Aquarium building since 1995. It was a Nintendo-sponsored video game centre with the (then) latest Nintendo video games and attractions. Filling the gap, in 2009 the former 3D theatre housed Nintendo DS and Wii consoles, advertisements and had a Nintendo Store. This attraction too was permanently phased out a few years later.

For the 2007 season, La Ronde painted its observation tower bright orange to advertise Pizza Pizza, an Ontario pizza chain that was emerging into the Quebec market at the time. All of the pizza stands inside the park were renamed from Pizza Ronde to Pizza Pizza.

In January 2009, La Ronde announced its intention to become a Six Flags branded park, using the rights to Warner Bros. (Looney Tunes) and DC Comics trademarks under the licensing agreement with Six Flags. Le Vampire, a mirror image of Batman: The Ride constructed in 2002, carries no association to the Batman media franchise because the license with Warner Bros. and DC Comics is not valid in unbranded Six Flags parks. It is not yet known whether Le Vampire will be re-branded to Batman: The Ride once the branding of the park commences.

The Serial Thriller, a Vekoma Suspended Looping Coaster that used to be located at the now defunct Six Flags AstroWorld, was shipped to La Ronde from the Great Escape, another Six Flags property where it had laid in storage since 2005. The roller coaster, which opened in 1999 at Six Flags AstroWorld, was installed over the Lac des Dauphins at the park for the 2010 season and is named Ednör – L'Attaque. It features special effects and is themed around an alleged sea monster that was purported to have appeared in the Lac des Dauphins.

On March 9, 2010, La Ronde announced that Terminator X: A Laser Battle for Salvation, an interactive laser-tag attraction themed around the Terminator series, would also be featured in the park for the 2010 season.

On January 19, 2012, Six Flags announced Vol Ultime at La Ronde; it is similar to the SkyScreamers and it is 45-metre (148 ft) tall.

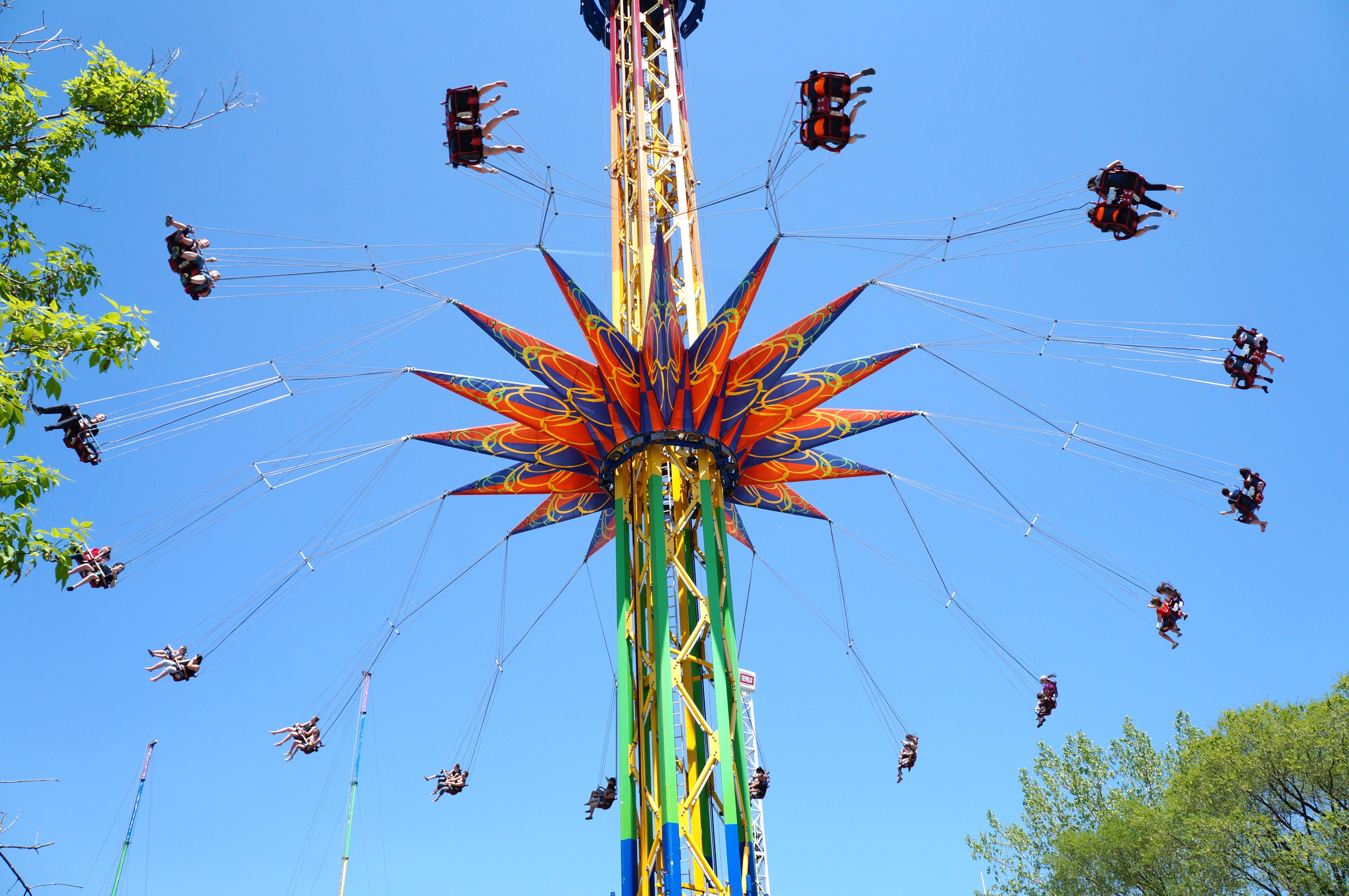
The Vol Ultime was opened at the park in 2012.

In 2013, the park opened a water-themed attraction, Aqua Twist. On August 29, 2013, Six Flags announced the addition of Demon, a top spin ride, for the 2014 season. As a world premiere, Goliath was the first roller coaster equipped and exploited with a virtual reality headset.

On August 28, 2014, Six Flags announced Maison Rouge, a haunted house, for the 2015 season.

On September 3, 2015, Six Flags announced Avenue Aventure, a section of the park which includes Bateau Pirate, Condor and two new rides: Phoenix, a Larson flying scooters, and Gravitor, a Chance Falling Star from Six Flags St. Louis.

On September 1, 2016, Six Flags announced Titan, a Zamperla Giant Discovery. It is the park's second pendulum ride. It is identical to the Riddler Revenge at Six Flags Over Texas.

In 2017, Le Monstre had only one track open for mainly the whole season while the other track was retracked.

In May 2017, on its 50th anniversary, La Ronde announced the permanent closure of one of its original rides, La Pitoune. The water log ride dated back to Expo 67, and had its final season in operation in 2016. It has since been dismantled.

On Saturday, May 19, 2018, Six Flags La Ronde opened a platform thrill ride called Le Tourbillon, a Larson International GX5 model (Waltzer-style) Tilt-A-Whirl, residing along L'Avenue across from the Phoenix. This addition was supposed to have been amongst the proposed featured rides for a new family section, called Carnaval En Folie (the newly added ride was due to be named La Torsade).

On May 18, 2019, La Ronde debuted a new ride called Chaos, a Fire Ball ride by Larson International previously known as El Diablo when it was located at Six Flags Great Adventure from 2015 to 2018. After being relocated to La Ronde, its red color was changed to black, and it received new trains. Chaos is located on the former site of Le Moulin de la Sorcière between the rides Manitou and Boomerang.

On August 25, 2019, Super Manège closed. In August 2019, Six Flags announced that Vipère, formerly Green Lantern: First Flight at Six Flags Magic Mountain, would debut in 2020. The project was delayed several times and ultimately cancelled in 2022.

In November 2022, La Ronde began the demolition and removal of the Minirail, another original ride dating back to Expo 67. It had been out of service since 2019, and was the last vestige of the monorail system that ran three separate circuits, with one on Notre-Dame Island and two on opposite ends of Saint Helen's Island.

In May 2023, La Ronde silently retired its Galopant carousel (built in 1885) when it was removed from its official park map and list of rides. Its final season of operation was 2019 (its 19th century music organ stopped working two decades earlier). The carousel has been at La Ronde since Expo 67, but heritage groups are concerned as its upkeep and maintenance have been abandoned and it's now in a deteriorating state.

In November 2025, La Ronde demolished and removed Spirale. The ride, which had not operated since 2018, was installed during Expo 67 and had been a fixture of the park and city's skyline for nearly 60 years.

== Former attractions ==
A number of attractions and amusement rides have been installed and later removed from the park. They include:

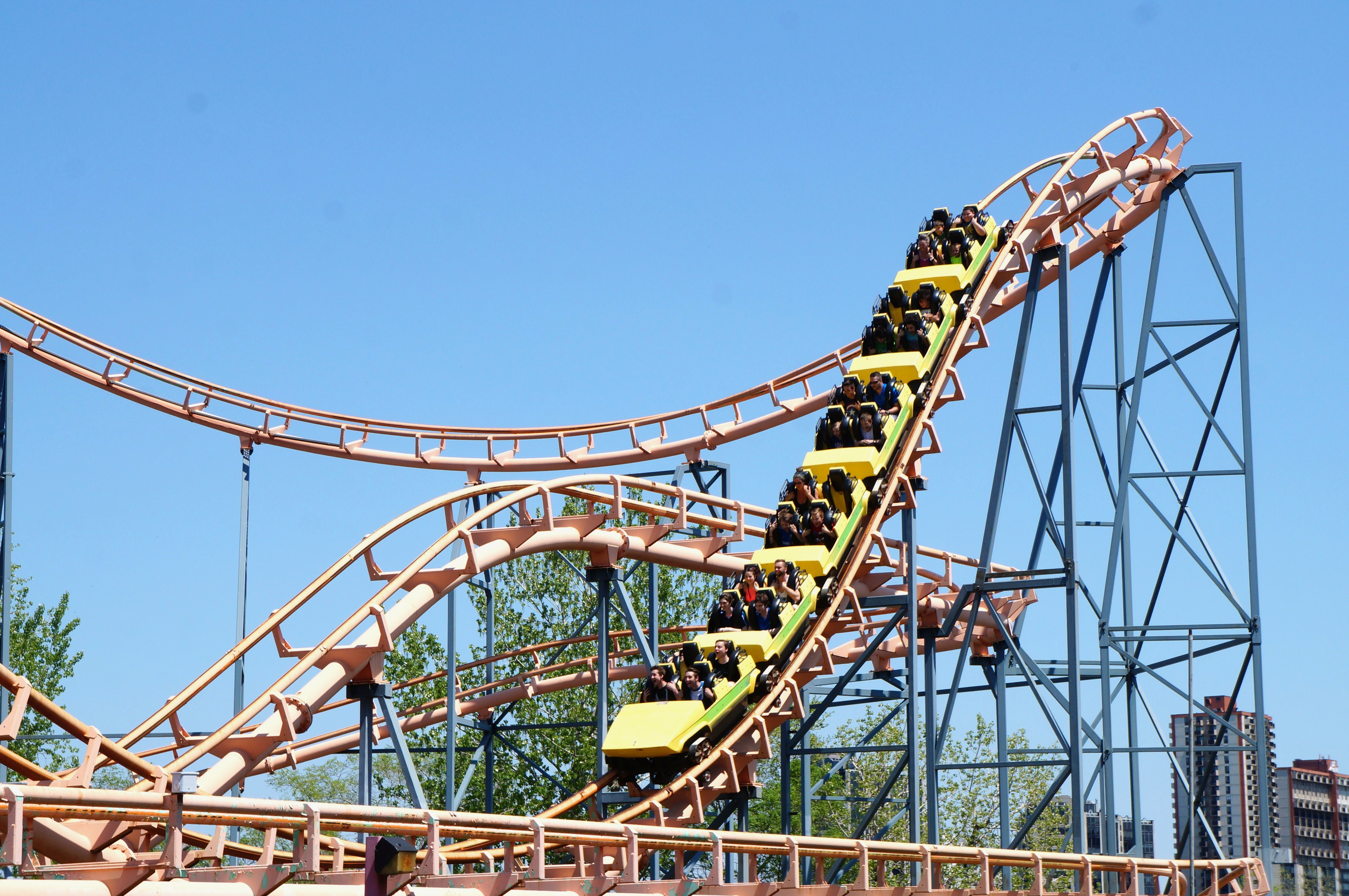
The former Super Manège (1981–2019) at La Ronde. The roller coaster was removed from the park in 2019

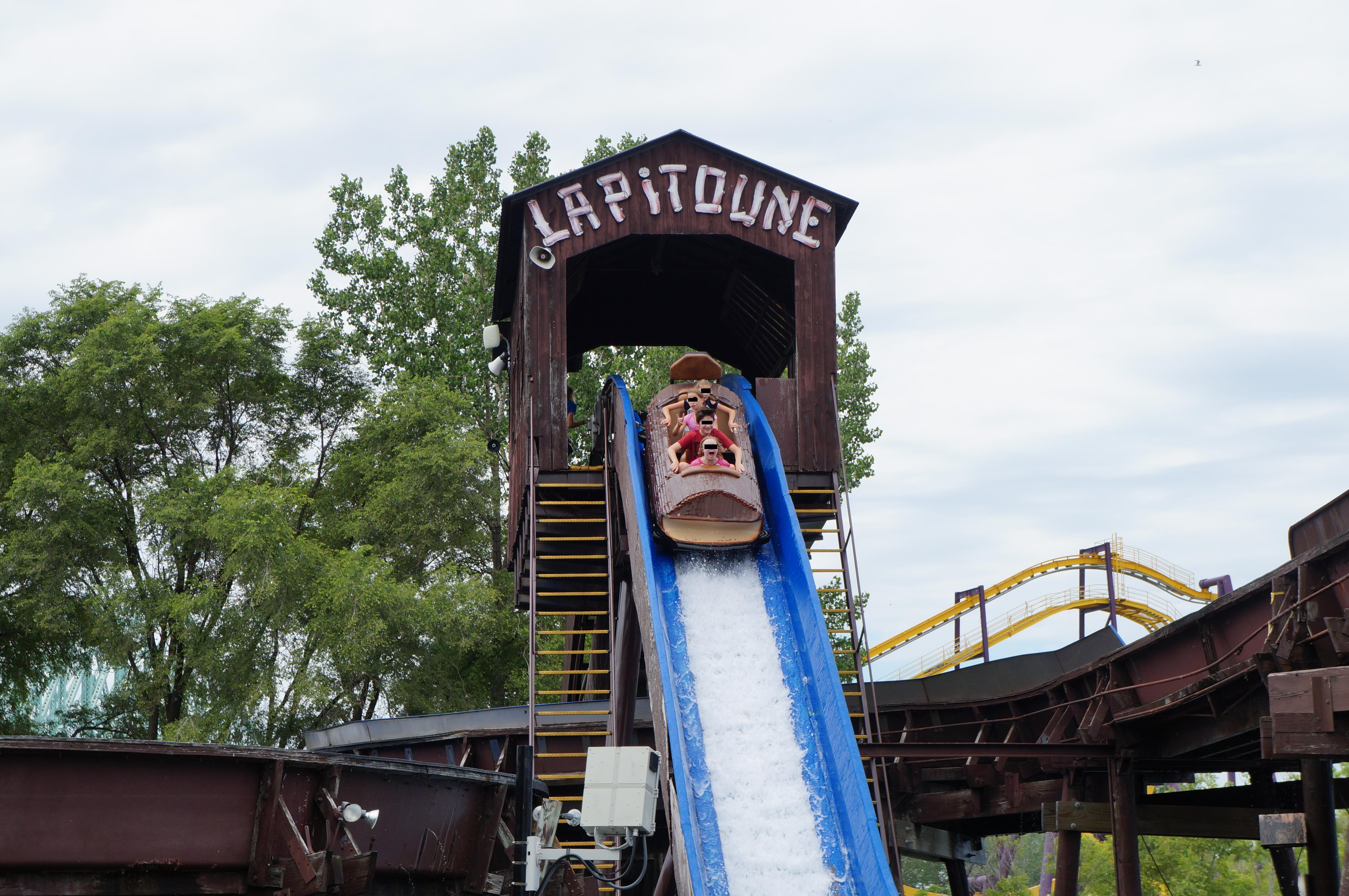
The former La Pitoune (1967–2017). The ride was removed in 2018

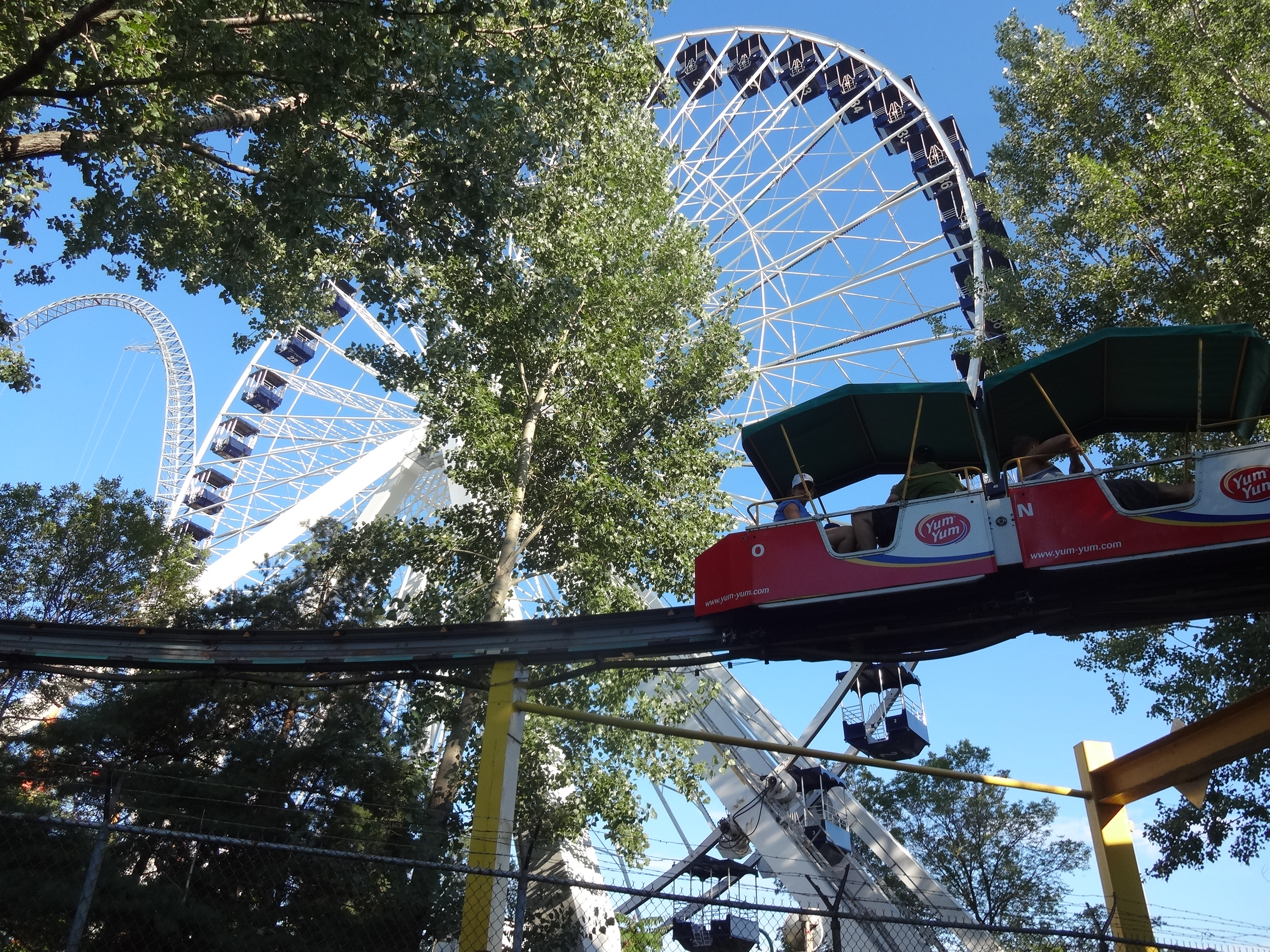
The park's former monorail, the Minirail (1967–2019), as it passed by the Grande Roue, the park's Ferris wheel. The ride was removed in 2022

Name	Manufacturer	Installation Year	Closed	Description
Sprung Schanze	Mack	1967	1969	
Voyage a la Lune	Schwarzkopf	1967	1968	
Hofbrauhaus (Fun House)	Schwarzkopf	1967	1970	
Parasols, Les	Schwarzkopf	1967	1971	
Flitzer		1967	1974	
Bobsled	Schwarzkopf	1967	1980	
Parachutes, Les		1967	1980	
Gyrotron	Von Roll	1967	1977	Replaced by Le Monstre in 1985.
Scooter	Schwarzkopf	1967	1982	
Calypso		1967	1982	
Carroussel (Car Carousel)	Hennecke	1967	1983	
Trabant	Chance Rides	1967	1981	
Turbo		1967	1979	Replaced by Boomerang in 1984.
Spider		1967	1984	Replaced by Maelstrom.
Grande Roue		1967	1983	Replaced by Condor.
Alcan Aquarium		1967	1991	Replaced by Nintendo Megadome.
Sky Ride / Le Téléférique	Von Roll	1967	1996	Replaced by Dragon.
Mont Blanc	Reverchon	1967	2000	
Bagnoles, Les (Antique Cars)	Arrow	1967	2004	Replaced by Air Papillon.
Pitoune, La	Arrow Dynamics	1967	2017	
Spirale	Von Roll Holding	1967	2018	
Minirail	Maschinen, Fabeiv	1967	2019	
Galopant, Le (Note: Ride retired, however currently remains on site)	Bairolle	1967	2019	
Montagnes Russes, Les	Schwarzkopf	1968	1984	Replaced by Le Monstre.
Super Himalaya	Mack	1968	1985	
Flight to Mars	Schwarzkopf	1969	1970	
Matterhorn	Mack	1969	1974	
Bousclade, La	Eli-Bridge	1969	1976	
Petites Avions	Herschell	1969	1990	
Moulin de la Sorcière, Le	Pinfari	1972	2004	Replaced by Chaos.
Astronet	Hampton	1970	1983	
Mini Patrouille	Hampton	1970	1983	
Saut, Le	Mack	1971	1971	
Tornade, La	Watkins	1971	1973	
Brasserie du Rire (Fun House)		1971	1974	
Saturne VI	Portable-Rides-Inc.	1972	1973	
Course, La	Zierer	1972	1976	
Tourbillon, Le	Hrubetz	1972	1983	
Rotor, Le	Chance Rides	1972	1987	Replaced by Astronef.
Zipper	Chance Rides	1970	1980	
Tilt-a-Whirl	Sellner	1974	1978	
Disco Dome	Eli-Bridge	1977	1984	
Cinema 180		1978	1984	
Salem Aleikium (Fun House)		1978	1985	Replaced by Le Monstre.
Mont Blanc, Le	Reverchon	1978	2000	
Troika / Diablo	HUSS Maschinenfabrik	1978	2003	Replaced by Le Splash.
Super Manège	Vekoma Rides	1981	2019	
Entreprise	HUSS Maschinenfabrik	1982	1988	
Arc en ciel	HUSS Maschinenfabrik	1983	1987	Replaced by Bateau Pirate.
Autos Tamponneuses, Les	Reverchon	1983	2002	Replaced by Le Toboggan Nordique
Carrousel Volant	Zierer	1983		
Astrobolides, Les	Sartori	1984	2004	Replaced by Le Marais Enchanté
Petite Roue, La	Sartori	1984	2004	Replaced by Pommes D'api
Chat et la Souris, Le	Sartori	1984	2004	Replaced by La Danse des Bestioles
Astronef (Sky Flyer)	Vekoma	1985	2002	Replaced by Le Manitou
Palais des Glaces, Le		1985	2003	Replaced by Le Splash
Twister, Le	Heintz Fahtze	1985	2008	Replaced by Phoenix
Maëlstrom	Mack	1985	2008	Replaced by Zone du bonhier Coca-Cola
Aqua-parc		1985	1992	Replaced by Vampire
Tapis Volant, Le	Zierer	1986	2002	Replaced by Les Autos Tamponneuses
OVNI	HUSS Maschinenfabrik	1986	2006	Replaced by Démon
Mini Rallye	Sartori	1993	2004	Replaced by Monsieur l'Arbre
Hydroid '94 (Sub-Oceanic Shuttle)	Iwerks	1994	1995	Replaced by Volcanozor (Dino Island II)
Volcanozor (Dino Island II)	Iwerks	1995	2004	Replaced by SpongeBob SquarePants 3D.
Nintendo Megadome		1995	2006	
Cobra	Intamin	1995	2016	
Tornade, La	HUSS Maschinenfabrik	1997	2010	
Rock Wall		2001	2010	Replaced by Aqua Twist
Eurobungy		2002	2011	Replaced by Gravitor
Tasses Magiques	Zamperla	2003	2009	Replaced by Ednör – L'Attaque
SpongeBob 3D	Iwerks	2004	2007	Replaced by Experience Nintendo
Experience Nintendo (Cyberzone)	Ubisoft, Nintendo	2008	2011	Replaced by Season pass processing center
The Mummy: Tomb of the Dragon Emperor	Sudden Impact! Entertainment Company (SIEC)	2009	2009	Replaced by Terminator X: A Laser Battle for Salvation
Terminator X: A Laser Battle for Salvation	Sudden Impact! Entertainment Company (SIEC)	2010	2010	
Maison Rouge (Haunted House) (Note: Attraction retired, however structure remains.)	ACME-Services-Sceniques	2015	2017	
Gravitor	Chance Rides	2016	2023	

== See also ==
- Belmont Park, Montreal
- Dominion Park
- Incidents at Independent parks
