= Goliath (La Ronde) =

Roller coaster at La Ronde

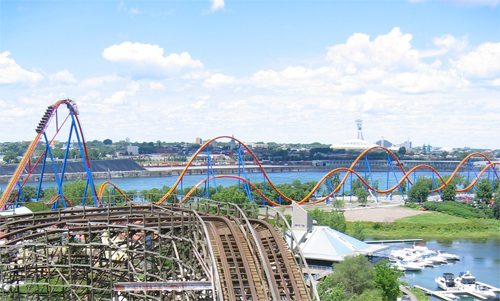
- Most of Goliath's layout

La Ronde
- Location: La Ronde
- Coordinates: 45.527812°N 73.536299°W
- Status: Closed
- Opening date: May 13, 2006; 20 years ago
- Cost: $18,700,000

General statistics
- Type: Steel
- Manufacturer: Bolliger & Mabillard
- Model: Hyper Coaster
- Track layout: Out and back
- Lift/launch system: Chain lift hill
- Height: 174.8 ft (53.3 m)
- Drop: 170.6 ft (52.0 m)
- Length: 4,038.8 ft (1,231.0 m)
- Speed: 68.4 mph (110.1 km/h)
- Inversions: 0
- Duration: 3:00
- Max vertical angle: 70°
- Height restriction: 54 in (137 cm)
- Trains: 2 trains with 9 cars; riders arranged 4 across in a single row for a total of 36 riders per train
- Accès Rapide available
- Goliath at RCDB

Goliath is a steel roller coaster at La Ronde amusement park in Montreal, Quebec, Canada. Designed by Bolliger & Mabillard, it reaches a maximum height of 174.8 feet (53.3 m), a speed of 68.4 miles per hour (110.1 km/h) and a track length of 4,038.8 feet (1,231.0 m). Construction commenced in September 2005, and the roller coaster opened to the public on May 13, 2006. Goliath was the tallest and fastest roller coaster in Canada until it was surpassed by Behemoth (another Bolliger & Mabillard roller coaster), at Canada's Wonderland in 2008. Six Flags announced in 2016 that Goliath would be hooked up with Virtual Reality for a New Revolution experience for the 2016 season.

== History ==
Speculation that La Ronde would be building a new roller coaster began in the second half of 2004. Rumors that the roller coaster would be manufactured by Bolliger & Mabillard emerged in September 2005. Construction for the roller coaster by Martin & Vleminckx began in September 2005 with land clearing and foundation pouring. The $18.7 million Goliath was announced on October 26, 2005. By mid-November, the storage bay was constructed with track pieces for the brake run and station being installed soon after. Construction on the lift hill continued throughout December and was topped off (the highest piece the lift hill) on December 21. The first drop was completed by mid-January 2006 followed by the first camelback hill which was completed by the end of February. After the second and third camelback hills were installed, the turnaround was completed in mid-March. The three camelback hills and banked turns leading back to the station were installed by the end of March marking the completion of installing track. The trains were also delivered in late March. After the cars were put on the track in April, testing began. Once testing was complete, Goliath opened to the public on May 13, 2006.

When Goliath opened, it was the tallest and fastest roller coaster in Canada. Two years later, when Behemoth opened at Canada's Wonderland, Goliath lost both records.

== Ride experience ==
After being dispatched from the station, the train immediately begins to climb the 174.8 feet (53.3 m) lift hill. Once at the top, the train drops back down 170.6 feet (52.0 m) at a 70-degree angle. The train then makes a banked right turn leading into the first of three consecutive camelback hills; each at a height of 121.4 feet (37.0 m), 95.2 feet (29.0 m) and 78.8 feet (24.0 m) (every hill is smaller than the previous one). Following the third hill, the train enters a 75.5 feet (23.0 m) left hand turnaround that makes the train face the opposite direction that it came. After dropping back down to the ground, the train goes over another three camelback hills; each at a height of 68.9 feet (21.0 m), 59.1 feet (18.0 m) and 52.5 feet (16.0 m). Then, the train makes an upward 45.9 feet (14.0 m) right banked turn, immediately followed by a downward left banked turn. After another 42.7 feet (13.0 m) left banked turn, the train rises back up and goes over a small bump before entering the final brake run. The train then makes a 180-degree right turn leading back to the station. One cycle of the ride lasts about three minutes.

== Characteristics ==
=== Track ===
The steel track of Goliath is approximately 4,038.8 feet (1,231.0 m) long, and the height of the lift is 174.8 feet (53.3 m) high. It is made up of 150 foundations, 300 pilings, 106 supports and 850 anchor bolts. The roller coasters has no inversions, though it does feature seven camelback hills. The track is painted red with yellow rails, while the supports are painted blue. It was manufactured by Clermont Steel Fabricators located in Batavia, Ohio.

Though Goliath is a B&M Hyper Coaster (the model name for this type of B&M roller coaster), the roller coaster is technically not classified as a Hypercoaster. A Hypercoaster is any roller coaster that reaches a height over 200 feet (61 m); Goliath reaches only 175 feet (53 m).

=== Trains ===
Goliath operates with two steel and fiberglass trains. Each train has nine cars which can seat four riders in a single row, for a total of 36 riders per train; each seat has its own individual lap-bar restraint. The structure of the trains are colored yellow, red and blue. The seats are blue and the restraints are yellow.

== Awards ==
In Goliath's opening year, it was voted the 37th best steel roller coaster in Amusement Today's Golden Ticket Awards. The roller coaster peaked at position 23 in 2011. It did not place in the top five new roller coasters for 2006.

Golden Ticket Awards: Top steel Roller Coasters
Year									1998	1999
Ranking									–	–
Year	2000	2001	2002	2003	2004	2005	2006	2007	2008	2009
Ranking	–	–	–	–	–	–	37	37	28	25
Year	2010	2011	2012	2013	2014	2015	2016	2017	2018	2019
Ranking	30	23	25	23	26 (tie)	36	31	41 (tie)	41	–
Year	2020	2021	2022	2023	2024	2025	2026			
Ranking	N/A	–	–	–	–	–	–			
