= Curtis D. Summers =

American engineer and roller coaster designer

- Born: September 17, 1929; Abilene, Kansas
- Died: May 11, 1992 (aged 62); Montgomery, Ohio
- Occupations: Amusement park engineering, roller coaster designer
- Known for: Curtis D. Summers, Inc

Curtis D. Summers (September 17, 1929 – May 11, 1992) was an American engineer and roller coaster designer credited for designing or providing structural engineering on 25 wooden roller coasters around the world. He earned a degree in Architectural Engineering from Kansas State University and was a registered engineer in 40 states.

== Career ==
Curtis D. Summers began his career in the amusement industry when he was contacted by Cincinnati's Coney Island to provide structural repairs to the park's Shooting Star roller coaster. He was hired by the Hixson Engineering Company and worked with Coney to keep the park's two wooden coasters, Shooting Star and Wildcat, structurally sound. In 1972, Summers left Hixson Engineering to start his own firm, Curtis D. Summers, Inc., based in Cincinnati, Ohio The owners of Coney Island, Taft Broadcasting, closed the park in order to escape the repeated flooding from the Ohio River and built a new park, Kings Island, 25 miles to the north. Summers was asked to design most of the structures of the new park and worked alongside John C. Allen to assist him by providing the structural engineering on the two new wooden coasters constructed for the park.

The Taft Broadcasting Company, and its successor, Kings Entertainment Company (KECO), went on to build two more amusement parks, Kings Dominion and Canada's Wonderland. They purchased an existing park, Carowinds; managed California's Great America and were co-owners of Australia's Wonderland. Curtis D. Summers and his firm continued to be the primary engineers for each of the parks. When John Allen retired from the coaster-building business in 1976, Summers took over as the primary designer of wooden coaster projects for the Taft/KECO chain of amusement parks.

In 1978 KECO started building The Beast at Kings Island. Summers' firm was brought on board to provide structural engineering for the massive helix finale. The project was built in-house and was overseen by Charles (Charlie) Dinn, Kings Island's Director of Construction, Maintenance and Engineering. Dinn left Kings Island in 1984 to start his own firm the Dinn Corporation. In 1985 he contacted Summers' firm to provide the design for the restoration of the helix of Paragon Park's Giant Coaster which Dinn was moving to Wild World in Largo, Maryland. That was the start of relationship that lasted until 1991. Following a few more coaster moves and rebuilds, the two teamed up in 1987 to start building new coasters. The two companies always operated separately but every new coaster built by the Dinn Corporation from 1988 to 1991 was engineered by Curtis D. Summers. Ten of these "Dinn & Summers" coasters were built during that time period, and many of them featured record-breaking drops.

Dinn retired in 1991 and closed the Dinn Corporation. Summers went on to design one more coaster, Jupiter at Kijima Amusement Park in Japan. The coaster was built by Intamin and opened in July 1992, a few months after Summers died. Two of the designers from Curtis Summers Inc. went on to start their own firms. Dennis Starkey started the Stand Company and Larry Bill worked a number of years for Custom Coasters International before becoming one of the founders of The Gravity Group.

== Wooden roller coasters ==
Opened	Name	Park	Notes	Status	Ref
1972	The Racer	Kings Island	Assisted John Allen with structural engineering	Operating	
1972	Woodstock Express	Kings Island	Assisted John Allen with structural engineering	Operating	
1974	Woodstock Express	Kings Dominion	Assisted John Allen with structural engineering	Operating	
1975	Racer 75	Kings Dominion	Assisted John Allen with structural engineering	Operating	
1976	Thunder Road	Carowinds	Based on Philadelphia Toboggan Company/John Allen design	Demolished August 2015 for a water park expansion	
1979	The Beast	Kings Island	Structural support, primarily the helix finale	Operating	
1981	American Eagle	Six Flags Great America	Contracted by Intamin to provide structural engineering	Operating	
1981	Mighty Canadian Minebuster	Canada's Wonderland	Loosely patterned after Shooting Star at Coney Island, Cincinnati, Ohio	Operating	
1981	Wilde Beast	Canada's Wonderland	Based on PTC Wildcat at Coney Island, Cincinnati, Ohio	Operating	
1982	Grizzly	Kings Dominion	Based on PTC Wildcat at Coney Island, Cincinnati, Ohio	Operating	
1986	The Grizzly	California's Great America	Based on PTC Wildcat at Coney Island, Cincinnati, Ohio	Operating	
1986	Wild One	Six Flags America	Restoration of missing helix	Closed at the end of the 2025 season along with the park. Currently SBNO	
1986	Wildcat	Lake Compounce	Complete in-place rebuild with profile modification	Operating	
1988	Wolverine Wildcat	Michigan's Adventure	First Dinn & Summers coaster	Operating	
1988	Raging Wolf Bobs	Geauga Lake	Removed	Disassembled 2010-2012	
1989	Timber Wolf	Worlds of Fun		Operating	
1989	Hercules	Dorney Park & Wildwater Kingdom		Demolished 2003 replaced by Hydra the Revenge	
1990	Texas Giant	Six Flags Over Texas	Converted to hybrid roller coaster in 2011	Operating	
1990	Georgia Cyclone	Six Flags Over Georgia	Converted to hybrid roller coaster in 2018	Converted	
1990	Predator	Six Flags Darien Lake		Operating	
1990	Woodland Run	Kentucky Kingdom	Summers engineering of John Fetterman design, Dinn Construction.	Operating	
1991	Psyclone	Six Flags Magic Mountain	Only wooden coaster to feature Bolliger & Mabillard trains	Demolished February 2007 replaced by Apocalypse: The Ride	
1991	Mean Streak	Cedar Point	Tallest Dinn & Summers coaster	Closed end of 2016 season refurbished by Rocky Mountain Construction	
1991	Pegasus	Efteling	Dinn corp left in middle of project — Intamin completed	Demolished 2009 to make way for a Great Coasters International dueling coaster	
1992	Jupiter	Kijima Kogen	Intamin project	Operating	

== Miscellaneous projects ==
- Carowinds, design of renovation and additions to park and 8,000 seat amphitheater
- Canada's Wonderland, complete park design including buildings and ride stations
- Kentucky Kingdom, Flume foundation design
- Kings Dominion, complete park design including buildings, ride stations and steel frame mountain
- Kennywood, foundation design for Shuttle Loop and Pirate Ship
- Raging Waters Waterpark (Wildwood, NJ), design of speed slide and raft ride
- Surf Cincinnati, design of speed slide and raft ride
- Six Flags St. Louis, foundation for Looping Star (Jet Scream) coaster
- Splashtown, USA, water ride supports and foundation

=== Sources ===
Curtis D. Summers, Inc. "Listing of Representative Projects," inserted into a company promotional booklet, likely distributed at the IAAPA trade show circa 1987.
