= 2002–03 AHL season =

- League: American Hockey League
- Sport: Ice hockey

Regular season
- Macgregor Kilpatrick Trophy: Hamilton Bulldogs
- Season MVP: Jason Ward
- Top scorer: Steve Maltais

Playoffs
- Playoffs MVP: Johan Holmqvist

Calder Cup
- Champions: Houston Aeros
- Runners-up: Hamilton Bulldogs

AHL seasons
- 2001–02 2003–04

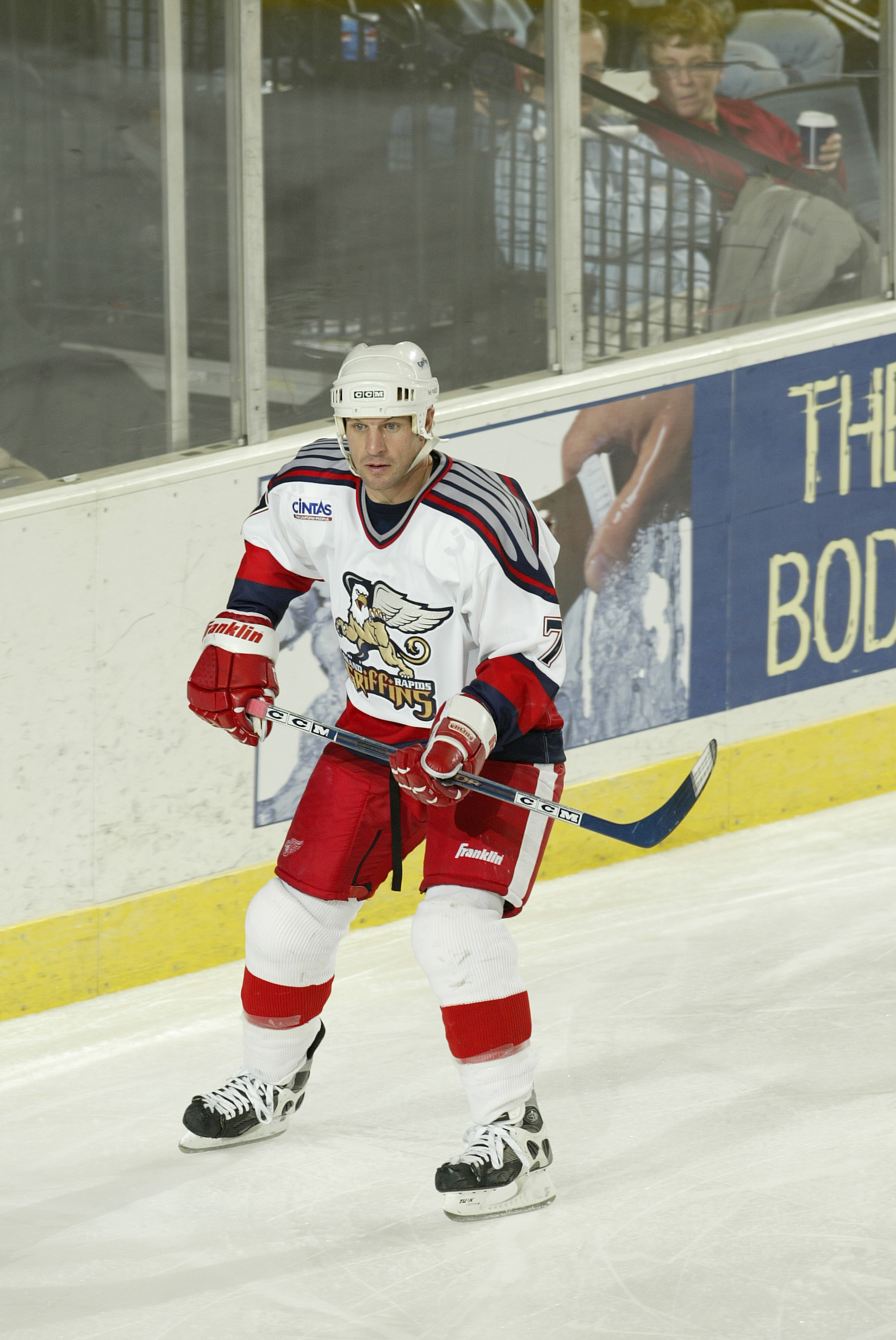
Michel Picard with the Grand Rapids Griffins c. 2002–03

The 2002–03 AHL season was the 67th season of the American Hockey League. Twenty-eight teams played 80 games each in the schedule. The Hamilton Bulldogs finished first overall in the regular season. The Houston Aeros won their first Calder Cup championship.

== Team changes ==
- The Quebec Citadelles move to Hamilton, Ontario, merging with the Hamilton Bulldogs, operating with as a joint affiliate for the Edmonton Oilers and Montreal Canadiens.
- The dormant Prince Edward Island Senators resume operations as the Binghamton Senators, based in Binghamton, New York, playing in the east division.
- The Springfield Falcons switch divisions from North to East.
- The Providence Bruins switch divisions from East to North.
- The Grand Rapids Griffins switch divisions from West to Central.
- The San Antonio Rampage join the AHL as an expansion team, based in San Antonio, Texas, playing in the west division.

== Final standings ==
- y– indicates team clinched division and a playoff spot
- x– indicates team clinched a playoff spot
- e– indicates team was eliminated from playoff contention

=== Eastern Conference ===
Canadian Division	GP	W	L	T	OTL	Pts	GF	GA
y–Hamilton Bulldogs (EDM/MTL)	80	49	19	8	4	110	279	191
x–Manitoba Moose (VAN)	80	37	33	8	2	84	229	228
e–St. John's Maple Leafs (TOR)	80	32	40	6	2	72	236	285
e–Saint John Flames (CGY)	80	32	41	6	1	71	203	223

North Division	GP	W	L	T	OTL	Pts	GF	GA
y–Providence Bruins (BOS)	80	44	20	11	5	104	268	227
x–Manchester Monarchs (LAK)	80	40	23	11	6	97	254	209
x–Worcester IceCats (STL)	80	35	27	15	3	88	235	220
x–Portland Pirates (WSH)	80	33	28	13	6	85	221	195
e–Lowell Lock Monsters (CAR)	80	19	51	7	3	48	175	275

East Division	GP	W	L	T	OTL	Pts	GF	GA
y–Binghamton Senators (OTT)	80	43	26	9	2	97	239	207
x–Bridgeport Sound Tigers (NYI)	80	40	26	11	3	94	219	198
x–Hartford Wolf Pack (NYR)	80	33	27	12	8	86	255	236
x–Springfield Falcons (PHX/TBL)	80	34	38	7	1	76	202	243
e–Albany River Rats (NJD)	80	25	37	11	7	68	197	235

=== Western Conference ===
Central Division	GP	W	L	T	OTL	Pts	GF	GA
y–Grand Rapids Griffins (DET)	80	48	22	8	2	106	240	177
x–Rochester Americans (BUF)	80	31	30	14	5	81	219	221
e–Cincinnati Mighty Ducks (ANA)	80	26	35	13	6	71	202	242
e–Syracuse Crunch (CBJ)	80	27	41	8	4	66	201	256
e–Cleveland Barons (SJS)	80	22	48	5	5	54	203	286

West Division	GP	W	L	T	OTL	Pts	GF	GA
y–Houston Aeros (MIN)	80	47	23	7	3	104	266	222
x–Chicago Wolves (ATL)	80	43	25	8	4	98	276	237
x–San Antonio Rampage (FLA)	80	36	29	11	4	87	235	226
x–Milwaukee Admirals (NSH)	80	32	27	14	7	85	247	251
x–Utah Grizzlies (DAL)	80	37	34	4	5	83	227	243

South Division	GP	W	L	T	OTL	Pts	GF	GA
y–Norfolk Admirals (CHI)	80	37	26	12	5	91	201	187
x–Hershey Bears (COL)	80	36	27	14	3	89	217	209
x–Wilkes-Barre/Scranton Penguins (PIT)	80	36	32	7	5	84	245	248
e–Philadelphia Phantoms (PHI)	80	33	33	6	8	80	198	212

== Scoring leaders ==
Note: GP = Games played; G = Goals; A = Assists; Pts = Points; PIM = Penalty minutes

Player	Team	GP	G	A	Pts	PIM
Steve Maltais	Chicago Wolves	79	30	56	86	86
Jean-Guy Trudel	Houston Aeros	79	31	54	85	85
Michel Picard	Grand Rapids Griffins	61	41	44	85	99
Mark Mowers	Grand Rapids Griffins	78	34	47	81	47
Simon Gamache	Chicago Wolves	76	35	42	77	37
Darren Haydar	Milwaukee Admirals	75	29	46	75	36
Cory Larose	Houston Aeros / Hartford Wolf Pack	82	27	48	75	77
Craig Darby	Albany River Rats	76	23	51	74	42
Mark Greig	Philadelphia Phantoms	73	30	44	74	127
Keith Aucoin	Providence Bruins	78	25	49	74	71

- complete list

== Calder Cup playoffs ==
Conference Qualifiers
7	Hartford Wolf Pack	0
10	Springfield Falcons	2
8	Portland Pirates	1
9	Manitoba Moose	2
7	Milwaukee Admirals	2
10	Rochester Americans	1
8	Wilkes-Barre/Scranton Penguins	2
9	Utah Grizzlies	0

Conference Quarterfinals
1	Hamilton	3
10	Springfield	1
2	Providence	1
9	Manitoba	3
Eastern Conference
3	Binghamton	3
6	Worcester	0
4	Manchester	0
5	Bridgeport	3
1	Grand Rapids	3
8	Wilkes-Barre/Scranton	1
2	Houston	3
7	Milwaukee	0
Western Conference
3	Norfolk	3
6	San Antonio	0
4	Chicago	3
5	Hershey	2

Conference Semifinals
1	Hamilton	4
9	Manitoba	3
3	Binghamton	4
5	Bridgeport	2
1	Grand Rapids	4
4	Chicago	0
2	Houston	4
3	Norfolk	2

Conference Finals
1	Hamilton	4
3	Binghamton	1
1	Grand Rapids	3
2	Houston	4

Calder Cup Final
E1	Hamilton	3
W2	Houston	4

== All Star Classic ==
The 16th AHL All-Star Game was played on February 3, 2003 at the Cumberland County Civic Center in Portland, Maine. Team Canada defeated Team PlanetUSA 10–7. In the skills competition held the day before the All-Star Game, Team Canada won 15–13 over Team PlanetUSA.

== Trophy and award winners ==
=== Team awards ===
Calder Cup; Playoff champions:	Houston Aeros
Richard F. Canning Trophy; Eastern Conference playoff champions:	Hamilton Bulldogs
Robert W. Clarke Trophy; Western Conference playoff champions:	Houston Aeros
Macgregor Kilpatrick Trophy; Regular season champions, league:	Hamilton Bulldogs
Frank Mathers Trophy; Regular season champions, South Division:	Norfolk Admirals
Norman R. "Bud" Poile Trophy; Regular season champions, West Division:	Houston Aeros
Emile Francis Trophy; Regular season champions, North Division:	Providence Bruins
F. G. "Teddy" Oke Trophy; Regular season champions, East Division:	Binghamton Senators
Sam Pollock Trophy; Regular season champions, Canadian Division:	Hamilton Bulldogs
John D. Chick Trophy; Regular season champions, Central Division:	Grand Rapids Griffins

=== Individual awards ===
Les Cunningham Award; Most valuable player:	Jason Ward - Hamilton Bulldogs
John B. Sollenberger Trophy; Top point scorer:	Steve Maltais - Chicago Wolves
Dudley "Red" Garrett Memorial Award; Rookie of the year:	Darren Haydar - Milwaukee Admirals
Eddie Shore Award; Defenceman of the year:	Curtis Murphy - Houston Aeros
Aldege "Baz" Bastien Memorial Award; Best goaltender:	Marc Lamothe - Grand Rapids Griffins
Harry "Hap" Holmes Memorial Award; Lowest goals against average:	Marc Lamothe, Joey MacDonald - Grand Rapids Griffins
Louis A.R. Pieri Memorial Award; Coach of the year:	Claude Julien & Geoff Ward - Hamilton Bulldogs
Fred T. Hunt Memorial Award; Sportsmanship / Perseverance:	Chris Ferraro - Portland Pirates & Eric Healey - Manchester Monarchs
Yanick Dupre Memorial Award; Community Service Award:	Jimmy Roy - Manitoba Moose
Jack A. Butterfield Trophy; MVP of the playoffs:	Johan Holmqvist - Houston Aeros

=== Other awards ===
James C. Hendy Memorial Award; Most outstanding executive:	Jeff Barrett, Wilkes-Barre/Scranton Penguins
Thomas Ebright Memorial Award; Career contributions:	Bill Watters
James H. Ellery Memorial Awards; Outstanding media coverage:	Joe Conklin, Grand Rapids, (newspaper); Dave Ahlers, Portland, (radio); Rogers Sportsnet, (television)
Ken McKenzie Award; Outstanding marketing executive:	Don Helbig, Cincinnati Mighty Ducks
Michael Condon Memorial Award; Outstanding service, on-ice official:	Marty Demers

== See also ==
- List of AHL seasons

Preceded by 2001–02 AHL season	AHL seasons	Succeeded by 2003–04 AHL season
