= Rebel yell (disambiguation) =

The rebel yell was a battle cry used by Confederate soldiers during the American Civil War.

Rebel yell can also refer to:

- Rebel Yell (whiskey), a whiskey brand introduced in 1936
- Rebel Yell (roller coaster), the former name of Racer 75, a roller coaster premiering in 1975 at Kings Dominion near Richmond, Virginia
- Rebel Yell (album), a 1983 album by Billy Idol
  - "Rebel Yell" (song), the title track of the 1983 Billy Idol album
- Rebel Yell, a 2009 novel by Alice Randall.
- Rebel Yell, a song by Assorted Jelly Beans featured in Tony Hawk's Underground.
