= Wilde Beast =

Roller coaster

- Previously known as Wilde Beast (1981-1996), then Wild Beast (1997-2018)
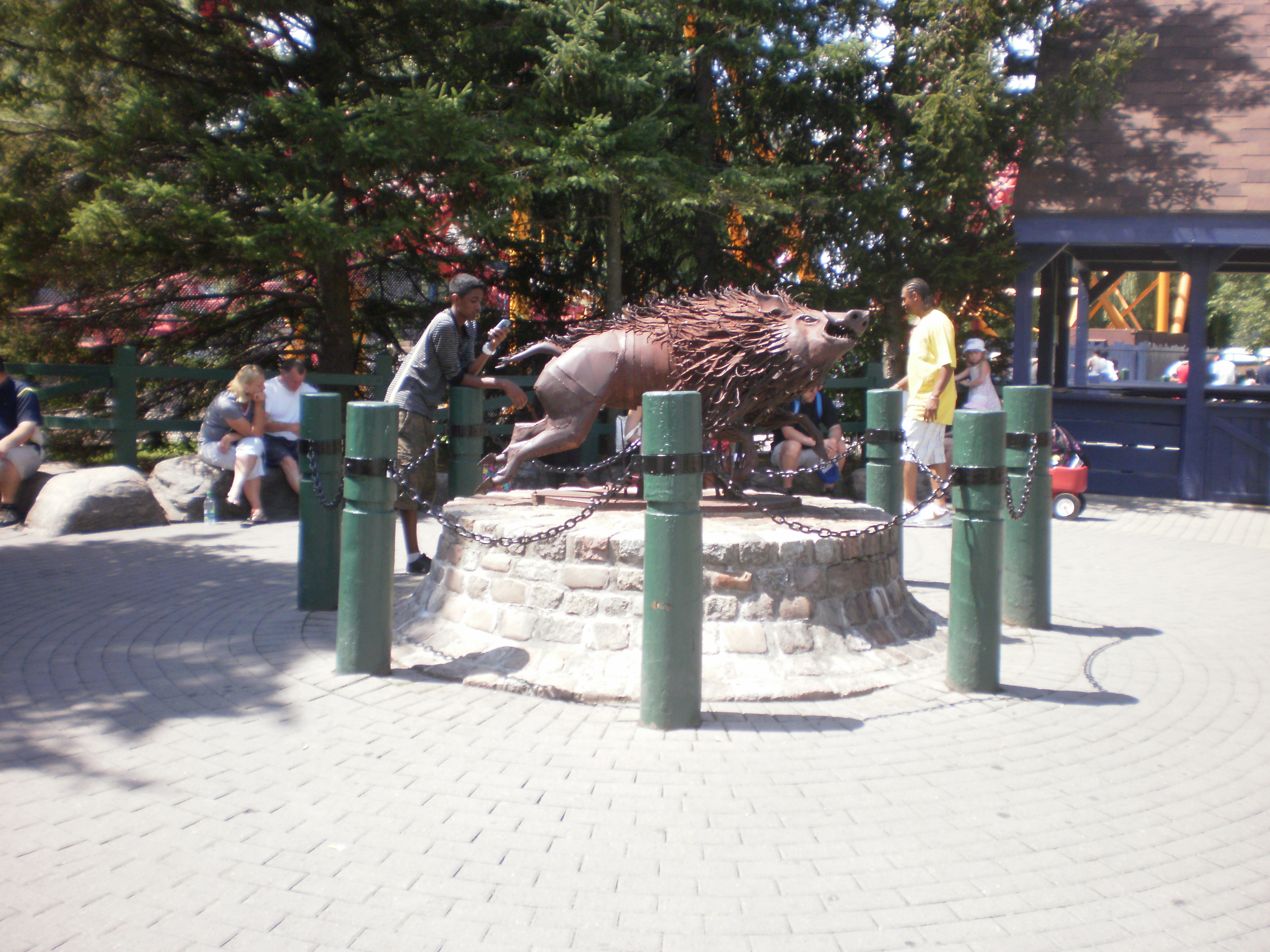
- "Wilde Beast" sculpture by Bill Lishman, at the ride's entrance

Canada's Wonderland
- Location: Canada's Wonderland
- Park section: Medieval Faire
- Coordinates: 43°50′38.94″N 79°32′35.37″W
- Status: Operating
- Opening date: 1981
- Cost: $1.2 million

General statistics
- Type: Wood
- Manufacturer: Taft Broadcasting Company
- Designer: Curtis D. Summers
- Track layout: Out and Back/Figure 8
- Lift/launch system: Chain lift hill
- Height: 25 m (82 ft)
- Drop: 23.8 m (78 ft)
- Length: 960 m (3,150 ft)
- Speed: 90 km/h (56 mph)
- Inversions: 0
- Duration: 3:00
- Height restriction: 122 cm (4 ft 0 in)
- Trains: 2 trains with 7 cars. Riders are arranged 2 across in 2 rows for a total of 28 riders per train.
- Fast Lane available
- Wilde Beast at RCDB

Wilde Beast is a wooden roller coaster located at Canada's Wonderland, in Vaughan, Ontario, Canada. It was originally named "Wilde Beast", from 1981 to 1996, when it was renamed to "Wild Beast" in 1997. The ride was reverted to its original name in 2019. It is one of the five roller coasters that debuted with the park in 1981, and is one of three wooden coasters at Canada's Wonderland modeled after a ride at Coney Island amusement park in Cincinnati, Ohio (specifically, Wildcat); the other is the Mighty Canadian Minebuster. The ride's fan curve was rebuilt in 1998.

== History ==
The ride is a double out-and-back coaster encompassing a figure 8 design. The ride was designed by Curtis D. Summers but is based on the original Coney Island Wildcat designed by Herbert Schmeck. It was constructed in-house under the direction of Summers. The coaster was not built by PTC despite a plaque at the operator's booth and several published reports that claim it was. PTC stopped building coasters in 1979. The construction crew likely comprised workers who had previously built coasters for PTC. The two 28-passenger trains were supplied by the Philadelphia Toboggan Coasters. Unlike the three-row PTC trains on Mighty Canadian Minebuster, Wilde Beast utilizes shorter two-row cars that are designed to better negotiate turns.

Curtis D. Summers continued to use this design at other Taft-owned parks including Kings Dominion in Virginia where the coaster, which opened in 1982, is known as Grizzly. Though similar in layout, the ride was tempered when reproduced as The Bush Beast at Wonderland Sydney in 1985 and at California's Great America as Grizzly in 1986.

The coaster was featured in the Fraggle Rock episode "The Thirty-Minute Work Week", where Uncle Travelling Matt took a ride on it, as he mistook it for a form of transportation. Puppeteer Dave Goelz has a cameo in the scene as the man next to Matt.

In 2015, the track was partially reconstructed after the first hill to create a smoother ride experience.

== See also ==
- The Bush Beast
- The Grizzly
- Grizzly (Kings Dominion)
