= Thunder Road (roller coaster) =

Defunct ride at Carowinds

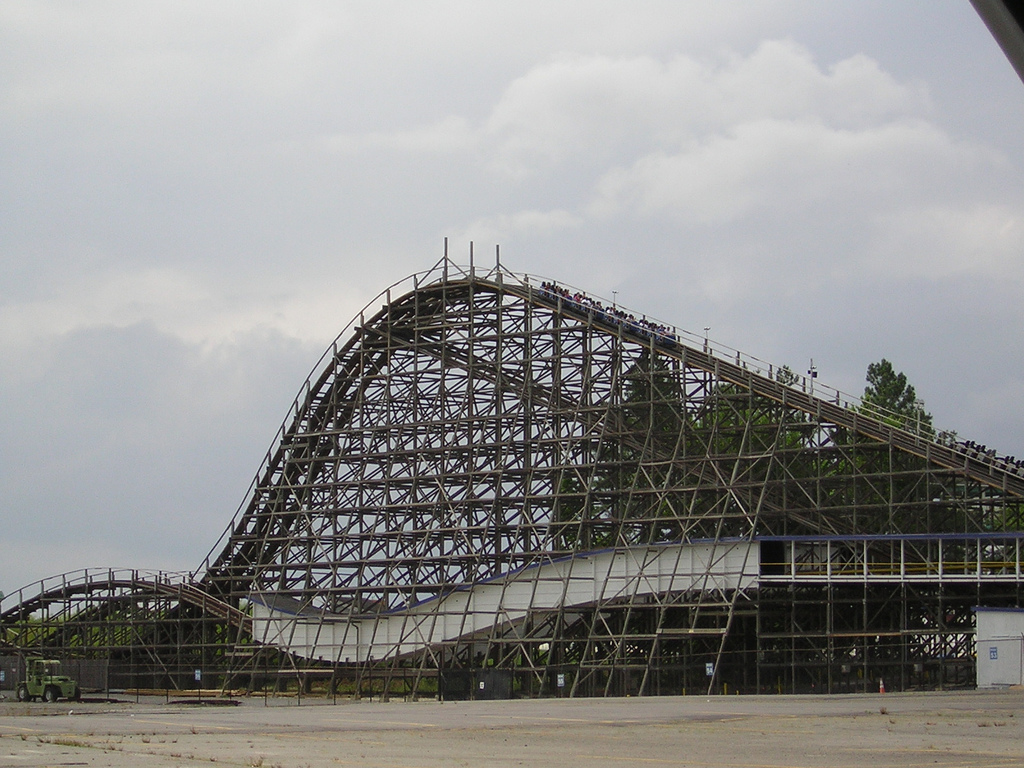
- Thunder Road from the parking lot

Carowinds
- Park section: County Fair
- Coordinates: 35.1004°N 80.9426°W
- Status: Removed
- Opening date: April 3, 1976
- Closing date: July 26, 2015
- Cost: $1,600,000
- Replaced by: Carolina Harbor, Copperhead Strike

General statistics
- Type: Wood – Racing
- Manufacturer: Philadelphia Toboggan Coasters
- Designer: Curtis D. Summers
- Track layout: Out and back
- Lift/launch system: Chain
	North Carolina (Blue)	South Carolina (Grey)
Height	93 ft (28.3 m)	93 ft (28.3 m)
Drop	88 ft (26.8 m)	88 ft (26.8 m)
Length	3,819 ft (1,164.0 m)	3,819 ft (1,164.0 m)
Speed	58 mph (93.3 km/h)	58 mph (93.3 km/h)
Inversions	0	0
Duration	2:10	2:10
G-force	3.4	3.4
- Height restriction: 48 in (122 cm)
- Thunder Road at RCDB; Pictures of Thunder Road at RCDB

Thunder Road was a wooden roller coaster located at Carowinds amusement park on the border between Fort Mill, South Carolina, and Charlotte, North Carolina. Opened in 1976 and built by Philadelphia Toboggan Coasters, the racing roller coaster cost $1.6 million to construct and featured two identical tracks that paralleled each other. The design of the ride was based on Rebel Yell (now Racer 75), a wooden racing coaster at Kings Dominion in Doswell, Virginia. Thunder Road was closed on July 26, 2015, to make room for expansion at the park. On August 27, 2015, Carowinds announced that the Boomerang Bay waterpark would be expanded and renamed Carolina Harbor. The expansion resulted in the removal of Thunder Road.

== History ==
=== Construction and opening ===
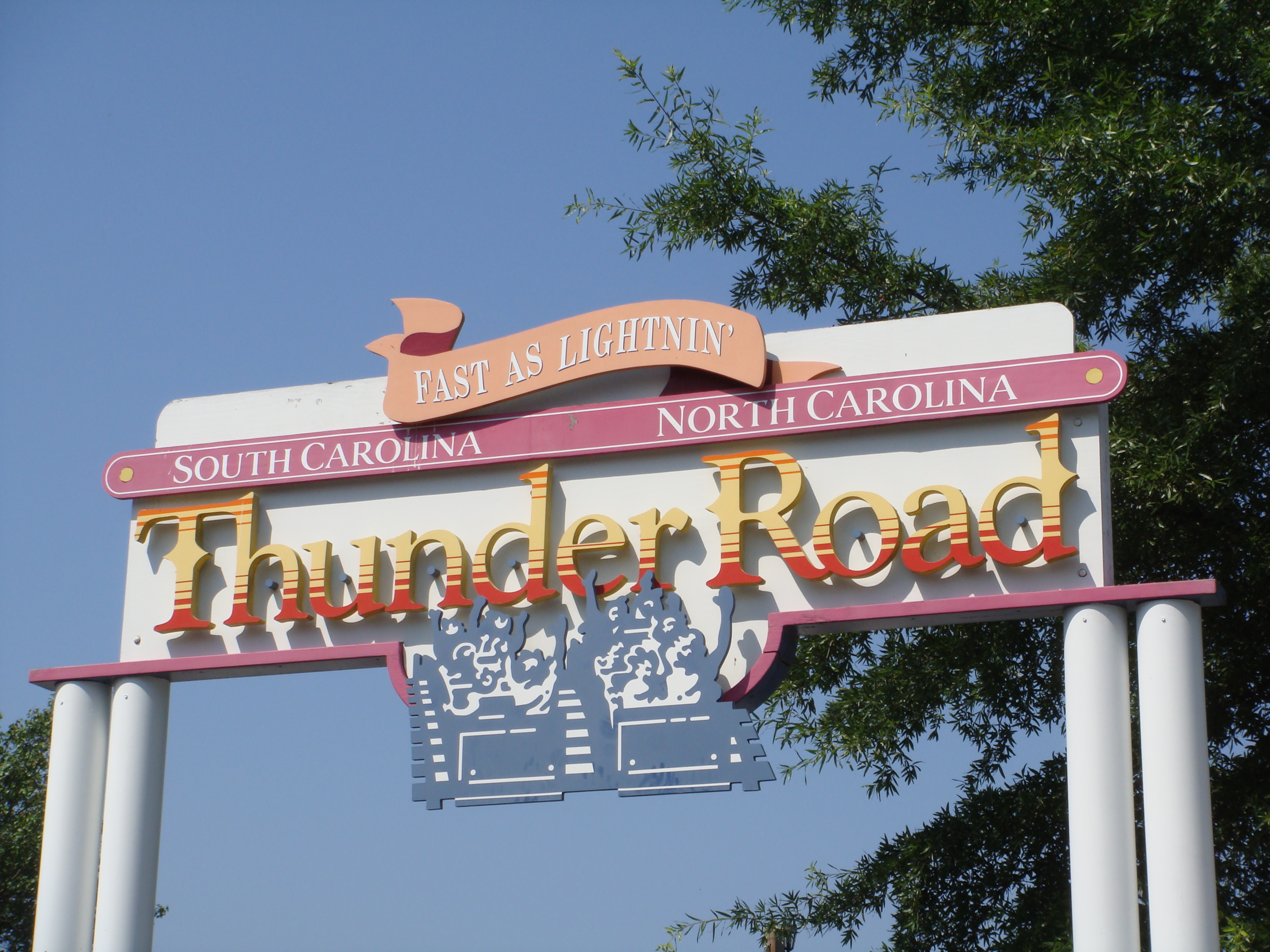
Thunder Road's entrance sign.

Carowinds unveiled plans for a $2 million expansion on January 22, 1975, at a press conference. The expansion would include a new roller coaster and renovation to increase ride capacity, provide a new dynamite live entertainment package and help with the food quality. Ride capacity was to be boosted by 25% through the $750,000 addition in new rides and the relocation of the existing attractions. There would also be a racing wooden roller coaster set to open in 1976.

In February 1976, Carowinds announced that the ride would be named Thunder Road. It was named and originally themed after the 1958 movie, Thunder Road. The attraction officially opened to the public on April 3, 1976. NASCAR celebrities Bobby Allison and David Pearson, along with major newspapers from around the country, were at Carowinds for the grand opening. Thunder Road was originally painted red, white, and blue. Two moonshine stills were originally placed at the entrance but have since been removed.

=== Operation ===
The ride originally featured trains from the Jetstream, a roller coaster at Chicago's defunct Riverview Park. For use on Thunder Road, the trains were themed to resemble a Sheriff's car and an Outlaw's car to fit the coaster's original theme. The Riverview trains were retired in 1980 and replaced with new, higher-capacity Philadelphia Toboggan Coasters trains the next year.

Thunder Road's trains all faced forward until one side was reversed in 1995 to run backwards. During the 1995-1996 off-season, the air conditioners and decorative memorabilia in the waiting area were removed. The ride got a new entrance sign in 1996 with the "Fast as Lighting" slogan. In 2008, all trains were turned to face forward once again. Portions of the track were also refurbished in 2008 and 2009.

=== Closure ===
Starting in 2015, Carowinds was planning a $50 million expansion. The expansion included Fury 325, new entrances, SlingShot and other new investments. Officials were also looking to expand the water park the following year. In order for this to happen, Thunder Road would have to close down. On May 23, 2015, the park announced that Thunder Road would be closed permanently. Severely negative backlash followed the announcement and a group had signed 2,400 signatures that doubled the immediate goal to save the ride. Organizers of the petition were hoping for a change. The final day of Thunder Road took place July 26, 2015 with a farewell celebration. The first 100 riders would receive a free commemorative Thunder Road poster and button. Fans created a tribute video by sharing their favorite Thunder Road memories. Submitting pictures also entered them into a random drawing from exclusive Thunder Road memorabilia. The winner prizes included a ride on the last train, free tickets and wooden pieces from the ride. By August, Thunder Road was swiftly demolished. Cedar Fair donated the ride's components to The Racer at Kings Island and Racer 75 at Kings Dominion.

Tributes to Thunder Road can be found in the Blue Ridge Junction section. There is a poster in the Blue Ridge Country Kitchen restaurant that says Thunder Road Dragway. The poster has a list of numerous sponsors. One tagline from the ride is "Grit Your Teeth", which was the sign riders saw while ascending the lift hill. The others are "Bear The Load" and "Enjoy your ride on Thunder Road". Plus, the station of Copperhead Strike contains a Centurion Motor Oil mural that pays tribute to Thunder Road and White Lightnin'. Thunder Striker also pays homage to the defunct coaster.

== Ride layout ==
Thunder Road featured a doubled layout with twin trains that ran simultaneously, each on one of the two separate, mirrored tracks. As the trains left the station, they embarked on a gentle downward turn in opposite directions that went out under the brake run. Both tracks met back up to ascend the chain lift hill 93 feet (28 m). As the trains climbed side-by-side, riders passed five sequential signs posted between the two tracks that together read: "Grit your teeth / Bear the load / Enjoy your ride / On Thunder Road / Burma-Shave." The trains "raced" down the initial drop of 88 feet (27 m) and over several medium-sized air-time hills before entering the turnaround section of the track farthest from the station. There the tracks diverged outward, and each train circled back independently toward the station, traveling across more small air-time hills and into the final tunnel-covered hill. Exiting the tunnel, the tracks converged again at last as they reached the final brake run back into the station.

From 1996, on the 20th anniversary of the opening, until 2008, one of the tracks had the coaster cars facing backwards.

== Incidents ==
On July 25, 1979, a malfunction brought a coaster train to a sudden halt when the wheels became slightly dislodged. The train stopped abruptly on the tracks approximately 12 feet (3.7 m) above ground. A total of 27 passengers were lowered to the ground by a lift from the back of a truck. The coaster's track was damaged, but there were no injuries reported. A park spokesperson later referred to the incident as a "freak occurrence".

On April 5, 1999, a train collided with another, leaving seven people injured. Sensors on the ride were then replaced, opening the ride again.

== Construction data ==
- 500,000 board feet (1,200 m^{3}) of treated wood
- 60-70 tons of nails, bolts, and track
- 5,500 US gallons (21 m^{3}) of paint (most parts with paint have been replaced)
