= Hercules (roller coaster) =

Defunct wooden roller coaster

- Hercules in July 2001

Dorney Park & Wildwater Kingdom
- Location: Dorney Park & Wildwater Kingdom
- Coordinates: 40°34′52″N 75°31′56″W
- Status: Removed
- Opening date: May 6, 1989
- Closing date: September 1, 2003
- Cost: $6 million
- Replaced by: Hydra the Revenge

General statistics
- Type: Wood
- Manufacturer: Dinn Corporation
- Designer: Curtis D. Summers
- Model: Terrain
- Track layout: Double out-and-back
- Lift/launch system: Chain lift hill
- Height: 95 ft (29 m)
- Drop: 151 ft (46 m)
- Length: 4,000 ft (1,200 m)
- Speed: 65 mph (105 km/h)
- Inversions: 0
- Duration: 2:15
- Max vertical angle: 47°
- Height restriction: 48 in (122 cm)
- Hercules at RCDB

Hercules was a wooden roller coaster located at Dorney Park & Wildwater Kingdom in Allentown, Pennsylvania. Manufactured by the Dinn Corporation and designed by Curtis D. Summers, the roller coaster opened to the public on May 6, 1989. It set a world record for the longest drop on a wooden coaster at 151 feet (46 m), surpassing the previous record of 147 feet (45 m) set by American Eagle at Six Flags Great America in 1981. Hercules was the third wooden coaster to be constructed at the park.

== History ==
In the 1980s, Dorney Park began making plans to add a significant attraction. Chairman of the Board and Dorney Park CEO Harris Weinstein decided that he wanted the park to have a world-class wooden coaster. Engineer Curtis Summers visited the park in 1987 to survey the site and start formulating a layout.

On July 15, 1988, Dorney Park announced that a new wooden roller coaster would be opening for the 1989 season. The announcement specified it would be located toward the back of the park near the lake. The park revealed its name, Hercules, in March 1989, stating that it would be themed to the Greek god of the same name. The coaster hosted its first riders during testing on April 14, 1989. A media preview was held on May 4, and the coaster opened to the public on May 6, 1989.

== Description ==
Summers took advantage of the hillside location to produce a record-breaking drop from a modest 95-foot lift hill. As the train left the station, it veered to the left as it descended nearly 50 feet then made a right-hand 180 degree turn to align with the lift hill that was parallel to the station. After climbing the lift, the train encountered a small dip, a turn to the left, and dropped 151 feet down the hillside at 65 mph. At the bottom of the hill, the train went through a highly-banked right-hand turn that swooped out over the park's lake. Upon completion of the 180-degree, the train entered a triple-up to climb back up the hillside. Once over the top, riders encountered an airtime drop under the station house, then a rise into a high-banked right turn. The next few drops were much smaller, as the track led riders past the station. Another high right-hand turn was followed by a drop of around 50 feet, before the train hopped up onto the holding brake.

=== Modifications ===
During testing, the coaster had difficulty climbing out of the valley, occasionally coming to a stop on the anti-rollbacks at the top of the triple-up. On media day members of the Dinn crew were stationed at the high point of the triple-up for the first runs of the day to make certain the train cleared the top of the hill. After the first few weekends of operation, the top of the hill was lowered by three feet. Hercules was running with a newly designed Philadelphia Toboggan Coasters (PTC) train that featured six four-seat cars coupled together with a trailer hitch. However, the hitch point was too far back from the rear wheel axle of each car, which caused the cars to oscillate in a side-to-side motion. Since these new trains coincided with the first Dinn and Summers coasters, this shaking became known to coaster enthusiasts as the "Dinn shuffle". Summers had calculated the correct angle for the high-speed turn at the bottom of the first drop, but with all the forces directed downward toward the bottom of the rails, the train moved from side to side trying to find the right path along the rails. This motion was further aggravated by the design of the PTC trailered trains. Eventually, the banking angle of the turn was lessened to keep the guide wheels pressed against the outside rail, but the turn remained problematic, requiring frequent retracking and reinforcement. The trailered trains were eventually replaced with articulating trains, and by the coaster's fifth year of operation, a trim brake was added to the top of the drop. In 1994, park owner Cedar Fair contracted John F. Pierce Associates to make several off-season modifications. The triple-up was converted to a double-up and lowered even further, the drop under the station was reduced, and the trim brake at the top of the drop was set higher to reduce the speed even further. During its operating life, the ride was retracked multiple times by Martin & Vleminckx.

== Demise ==
Following the 1994 modifications, the coaster continued to dwindle in popularity as ridership waned. Hercules closed for the season on September 1, 2003. Just two days later on September 3, Dorney Park announced that Hercules would be replaced by a new steel roller coaster scheduled to open in 2005. Hercules' site is now occupied by Hydra the Revenge.

Remnants of Hercules can still be found in Dorney Park. Several remaining concrete footings can be spotted throughout the backside of the park.

== Tallest coaster controversy ==
When Dorney Park signed the contract with the Dinn Corporation to build Hercules, a clause was included stating the company would not build a larger coaster for the next two years. The following year, Six Flags Over Texas contracted Dinn to build Texas Giant, which featured a 143-foot lift hill with a 137-foot drop. Six Flags claimed Texas Giant to be the world's tallest wooden roller coaster. Dorney Park filed a federal lawsuit against Six Flags over which park had the rights to claim having the "world's tallest coaster." Dorney Park also demanded that Six Flags halt all advertising, and sought $50,000 in compensatory damages. A trial was scheduled in Philadelphia, and on the day of the trial, U.S. District Court Judge Franklin Van Antwerpen summoned both parties into his chambers where the suit was quietly settled. Hercules could lay claim to having the tallest drop, and Texas Giant would be known as having the tallest coaster structure.
