= The Grizzly =

Wooden roller coaster in California

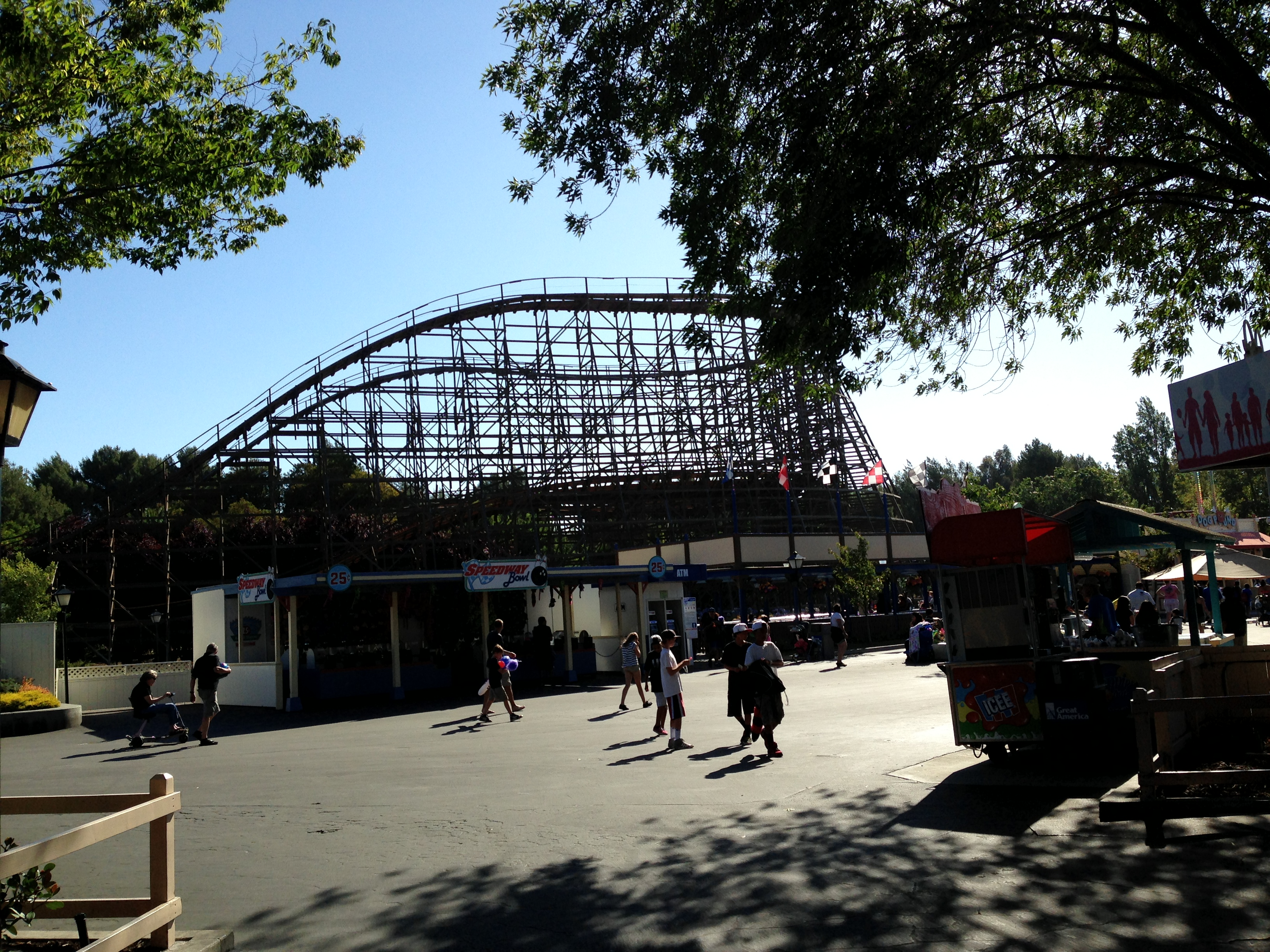

California's Great America
- Location: California's Great America
- Park section: NorCal County Fair
- Coordinates: 37°23′34.78″N 121°58′16.94″W
- Status: Operating
- Opening date: 1986

General statistics
- Type: Wood
- Manufacturer: Kings Island
- Designer: Curtis D. Summers
- Track layout: Double out and back
- Lift/launch system: Chain
- Height: 91 ft (28 m)
- Drop: 88 ft (27 m)
- Length: 3,250 ft (990 m)
- Speed: 55 mph (89 km/h)
- Inversions: 0
- Duration: 2:40
- Height restriction: 48 in (122 cm)
- Trains: 2 trains with 7 cars; riders arranged 2 across in 2 rows for a total of 28 riders per train
- Fast Lane available
- The Grizzly at RCDB

The Grizzly is a wooden roller coaster located at California's Great America in Santa Clara, California. The ride was designed by Curtis D. Summers and manufactured by Kings Island Construction. It uses traditional tracks with steel wheels on the cars, and, therefore, is designed to maintain positive-g loading on the cars and riders throughout its course. On November 6, 2026, Six Flags announced that California’s Great America would be permanently closing on September 6, 2027.

== Reputation ==
Opened in 1986, the Grizzly is a typical 'out and back' wooden coaster. The ride was retracked by Great Coasters International in 2014 and in 2017. As a result, the Grizzly has a faster and smoother ride.

== See also ==
- The Bush Beast
- Grizzly (Kings Dominion)
- Wilde Beast
