= Snowy River Rampage =

Wonderland Sydney
- Status: Removed
- Opening date: 7 December 1985
- Closing date: 26 April 2004

General statistics
- Type: River rafting ride
- Manufacturer: Intamin
- Length: 960 m (3,150 ft)
- Speed: 10 km/h (6.2 mph)
- Capacity: 780 riders per hour
- Duration: 2:30
- Boats: 18 boats. Riders are arranged 6 across in a single row for a total of 6 riders per boat.

The Snowy River Rampage was a river rapids ride invented by Intamin and installed at Wonderland Sydney, (then known as Australia's Wonderland) at its inception in 1985. Six riders would sit in a raft that resembled a giant tyre and wind their way down a river with artificial rapids in it. At the completion of the four-minute cycle, many customers would step off wet. The ride was extremely popular during the warmer summer months as an easy way to cool down.

When Wonderland Sydney first opened the ride was staffed by up to 8 people. There were four staff on the loading platform and four positioned around the ride in towers. Their job was to keep an eye on the boats as they went around, and ran smoothly. Over time, and as cost cutting was made, a number of the staff were replaced by cameras, and the ride was operated by only two people.

It was a common misconception of customers, that the staff members whose job it was to observe the ride from the towers were also in charge on the geysers that shot water into the air and over the boats as they passed. This activity was actually controlled by the location of sensors placed throughout the ride, that were triggered when a boat went past.

== Demolition ==
The Snowy River Rampage was closed on 26 April 2004, on the same day as Wonderland Sydney. It was demolished in December 2004.
