= Hakugei (roller coaster) =

Roller coaster at Nagashima Spa Land

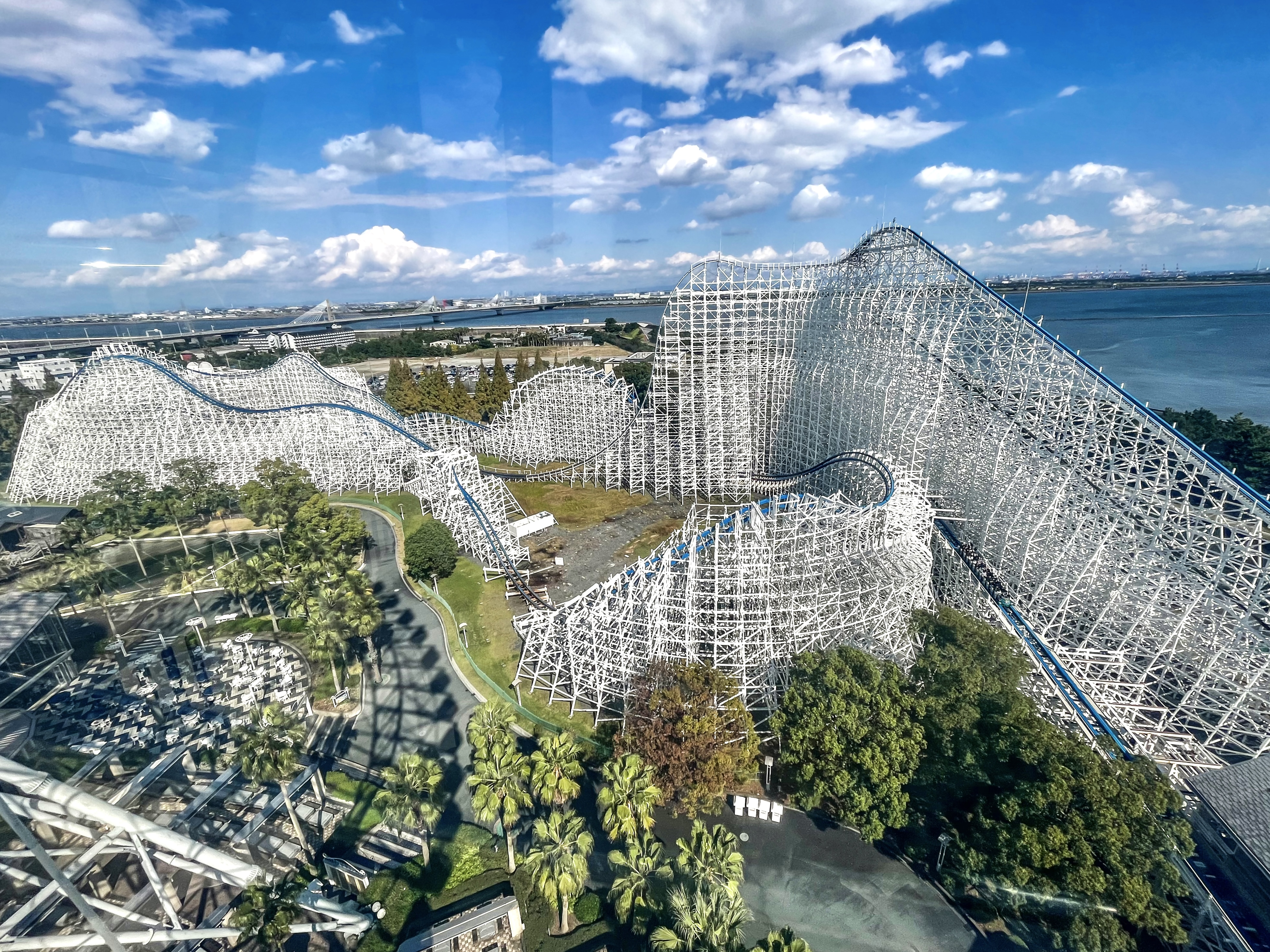
- Hakugei as seen in 2023

Nagashima Spa Land
- Location: Nagashima Spa Land
- Coordinates: 35°01′49″N 136°44′05″E
- Status: Operating
- Opening date: 28 March 2019
- Cost: ¥2,800,000,000

General statistics
- Type: Steel
- Manufacturer: Rocky Mountain Construction
- Model: I-Box Track
- Lift/launch system: Chain lift hill
- Height: 55 m (180 ft)
- Length: 1,530 m (5,020 ft)
- Speed: 107 km/h (66 mph)
- Inversions: 3
- Max vertical angle: 80°
- G-force: 4
- Height restriction: 130 cm (4 ft 3 in)
- Trains: 3 trains with 6 cars. Riders are arranged 2 across in 2 rows for a total of 24 riders per train.
- Website: Official website
- Hakugei at RCDB

Hakugei (白鯨, White Whale) is a hybrid steel roller coaster at Nagashima Spa Land in Mie Prefecture, Japan. It was originally a wooden roller coaster known as White Cyclone (ホワイトサイクロン, Howaito Saikuron) manufactured by Liechtenstein company Intamin, and it operated from 1994 to 2018. It was refurbished by American company Rocky Mountain Construction, which replaced the ride's wooden track with steel track and modified the ride layout, including the addition of three inversions. The renovated ride reopened on 28 March 2019.

== History ==
=== White Cyclone ===
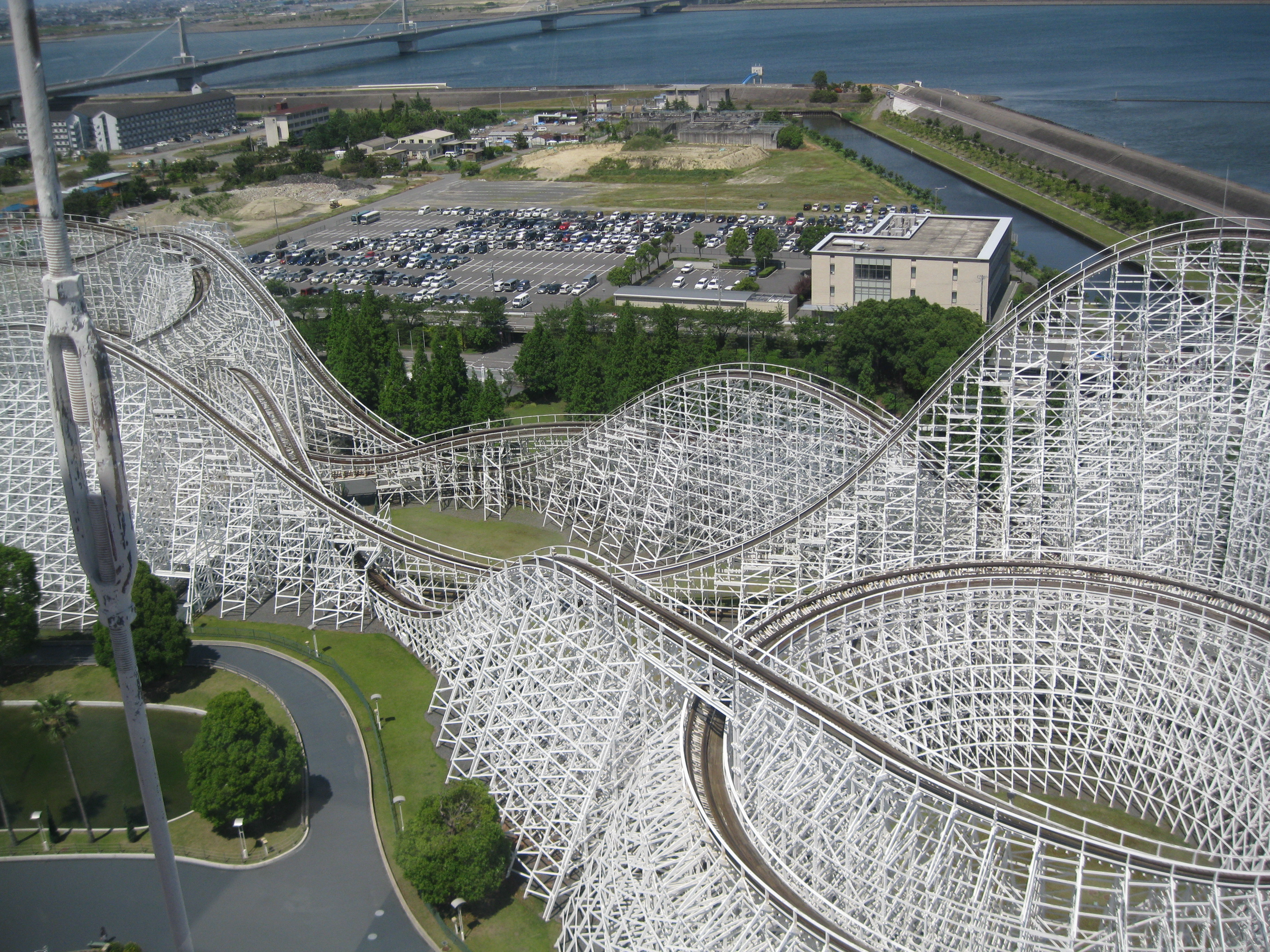
Closer aerial view of White Cyclone

Before White Cyclone's construction in 1994, there had been only one wooden roller coaster ever built in Japan. This roller coaster, Jupiter, opened in 1992—after the Japanese government relaxed height restrictions on wooden structures. Another wooden coaster, White Canyon, opened in 1994—the same year as White Cyclone. In 2013, the roller coasters Jupiter and White Cyclone were two of only four operating wooden roller coasters in Japan, and of only 13 operating wooden roller coasters in Asia.

White Cyclone was constructed of enough Alaskan timber to build nearly a thousand homes. The ride was particularly fast for a wooden roller coaster and featured many common elements such as helices, large drops and smaller bunny hills. The roller coaster had a double out-and-back track layout and used trains manufactured by the Philadelphia Toboggan Company. White Cyclone closed on 28 January 2018.

=== Hakugei ===
Rocky Mountain Construction refurbished the roller coaster using its patented I-Box Track technology. The ride's height and speed were increased and three inversions were added to the layout. The refurbished ride reopened as White Whale (白鯨, Hakugei) on 28 March 2019.

Statistic	White Cyclone	Hakugei
Years	1994–2018	2019–present
Manufacturer	Intamin	Rocky Mountain Construction
Track	Wood	Steel
Height	42.4 m or 139 ft	55 m or 180 ft
Length	1,700 m or 5,600 ft	1,530 m or 5,020 ft
Speed	102 km/h or 63 mph	107 km/h or 66 mph
Inversions	0	3

== Gallery ==
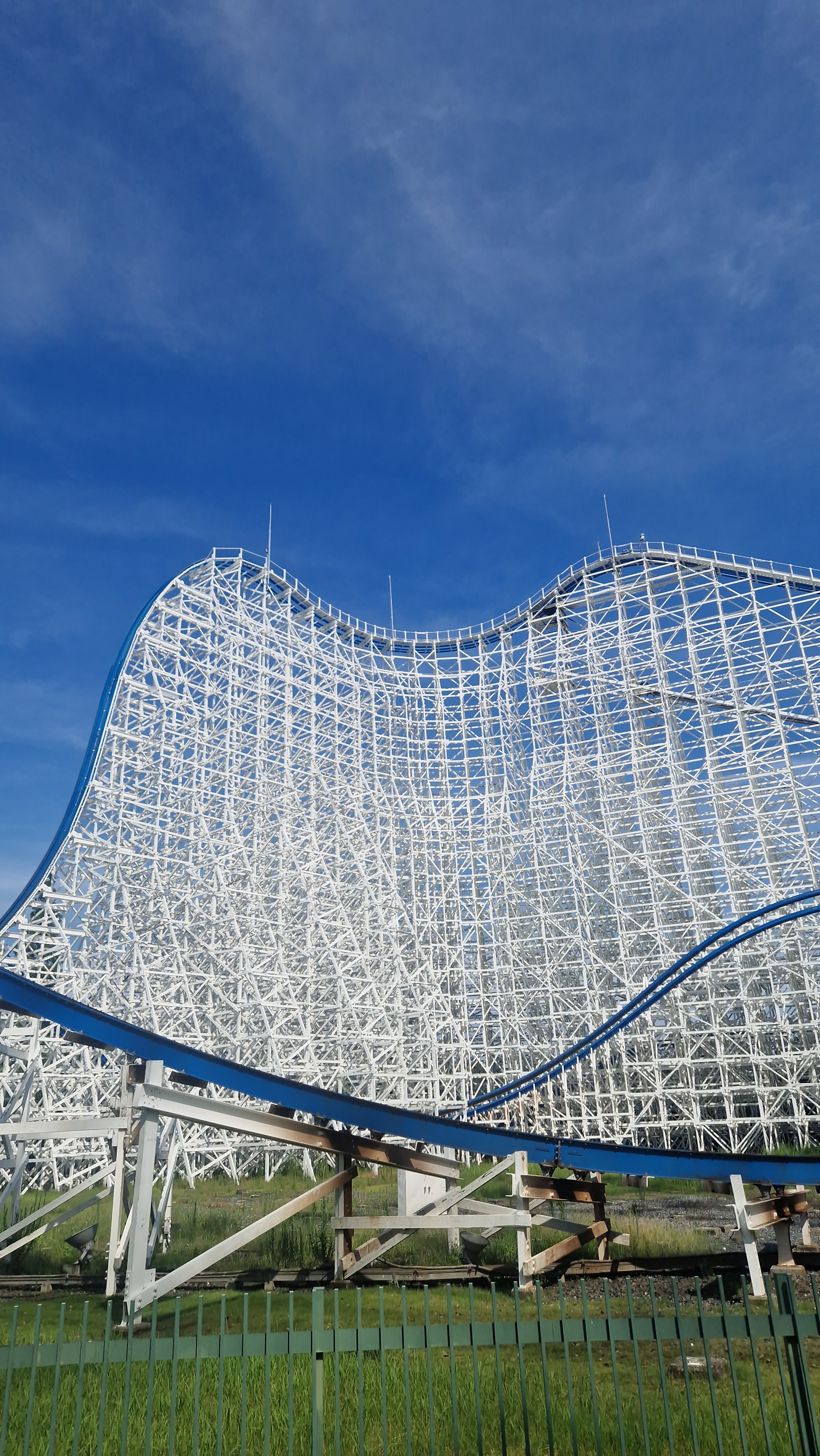

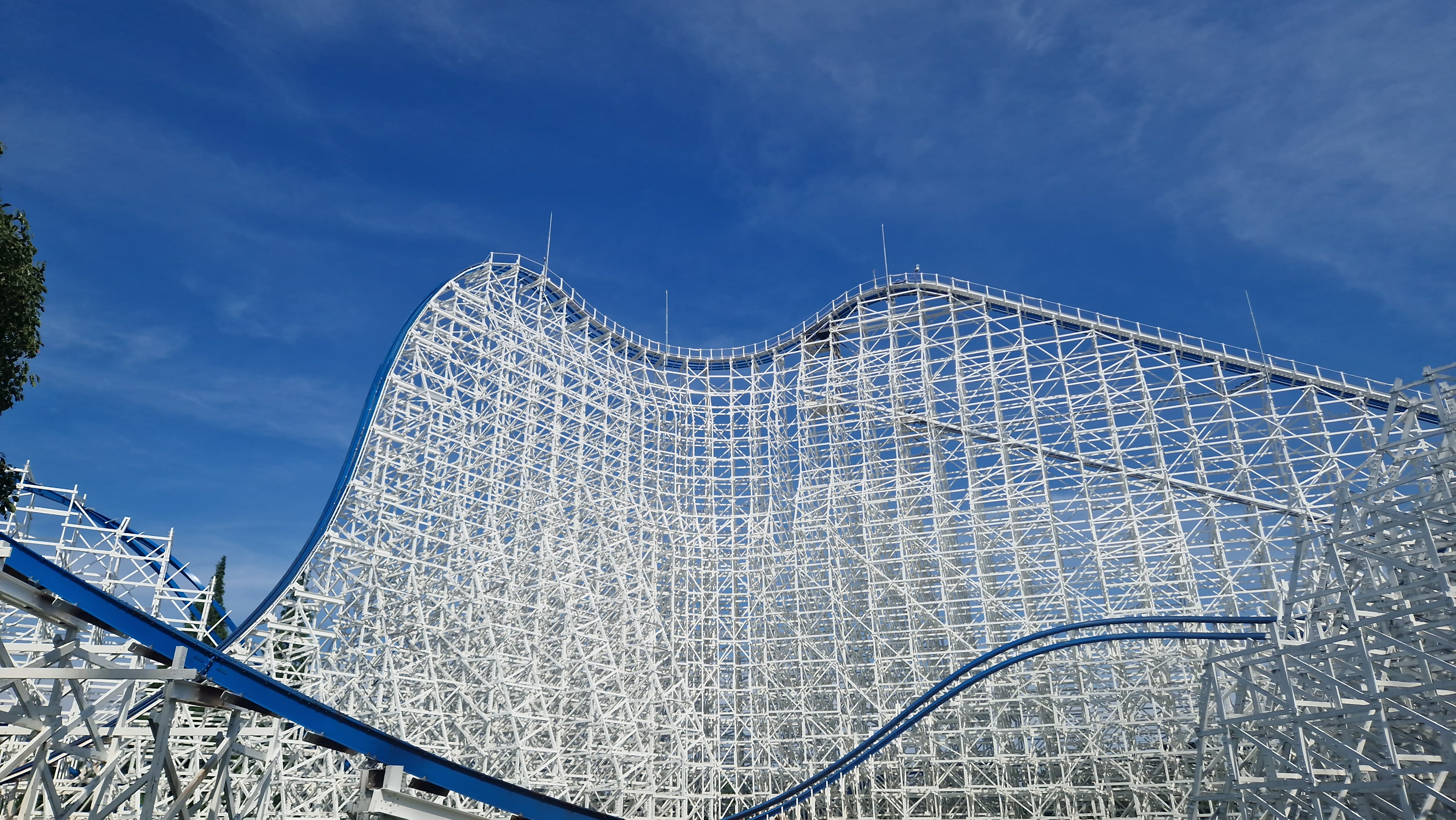

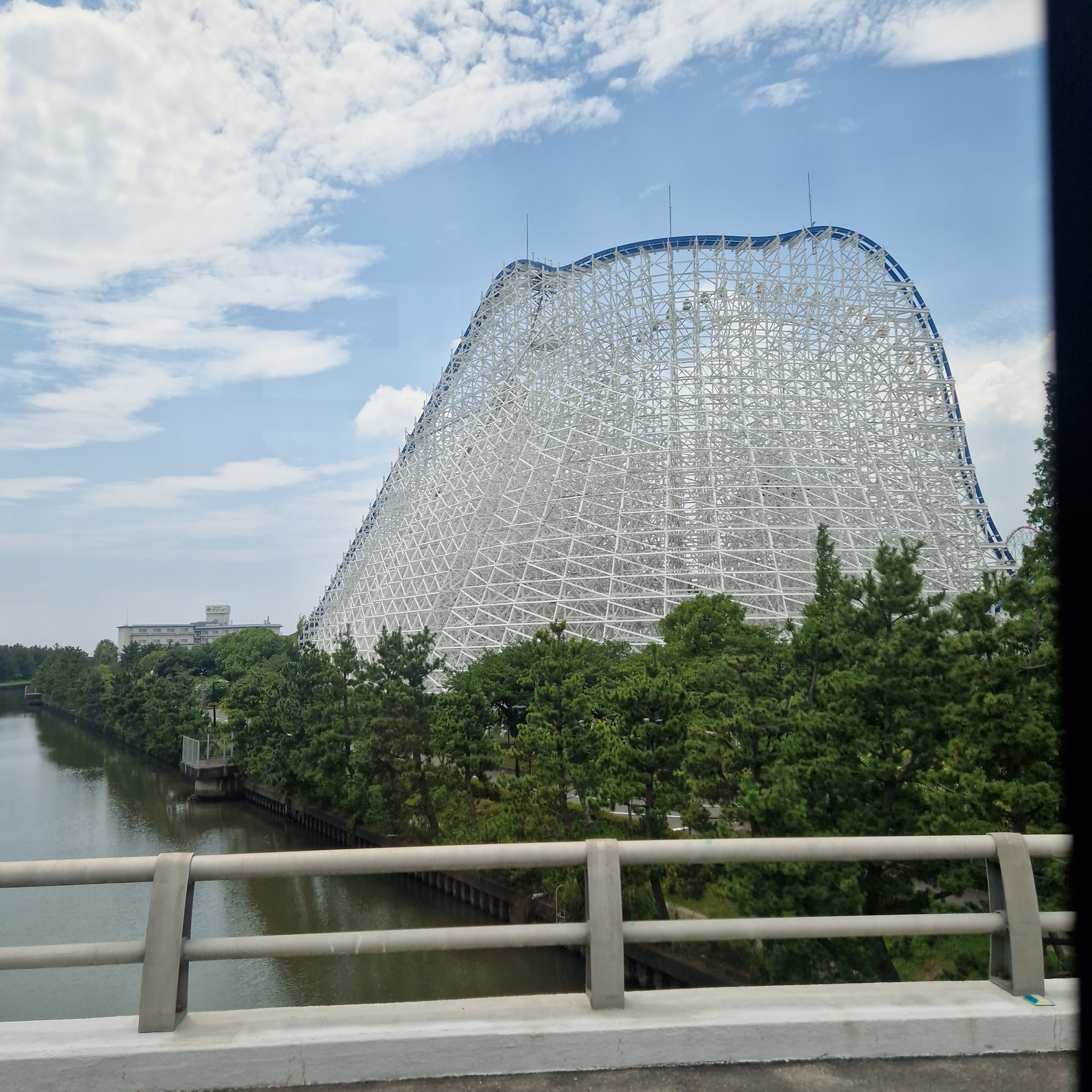

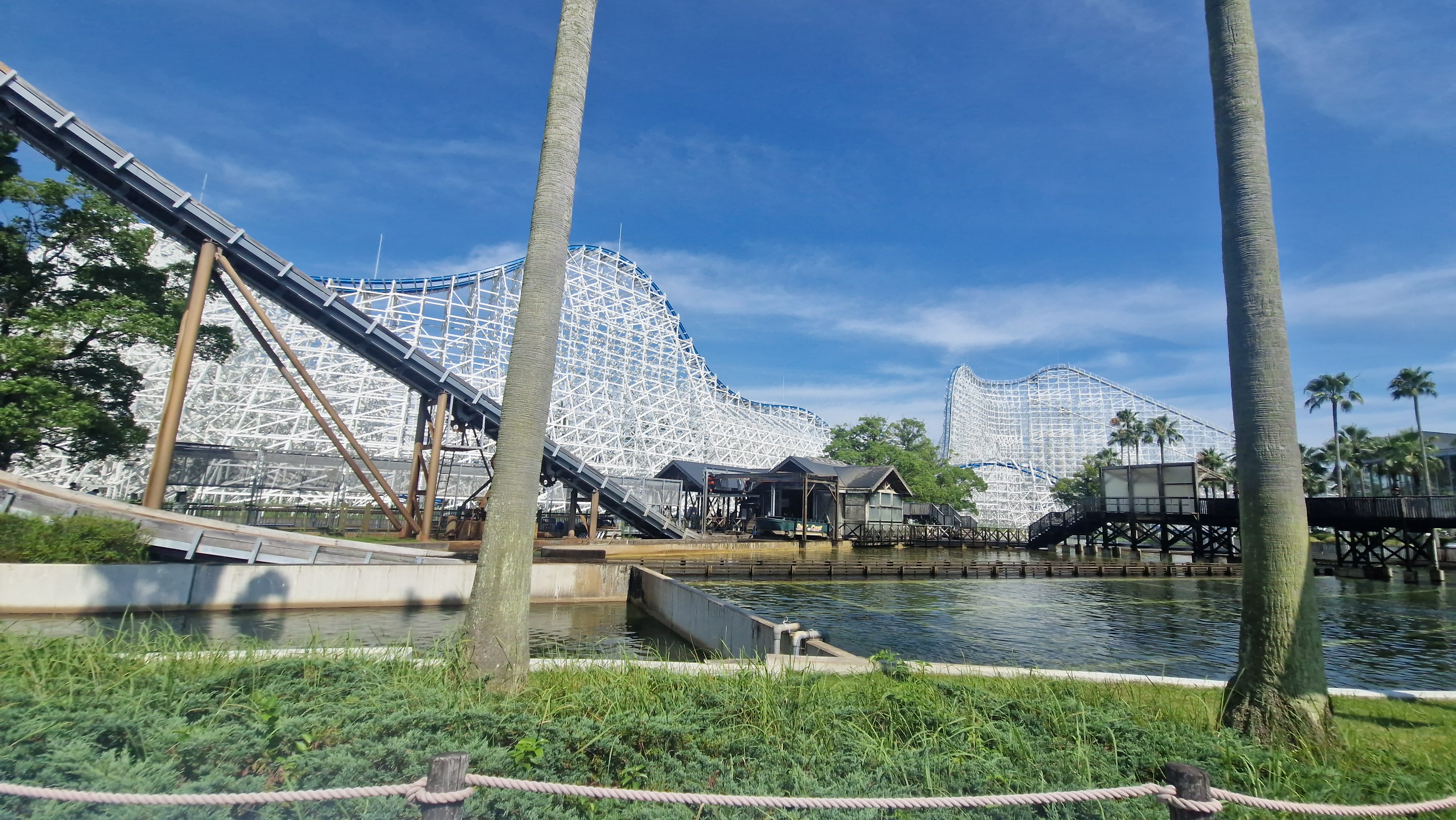

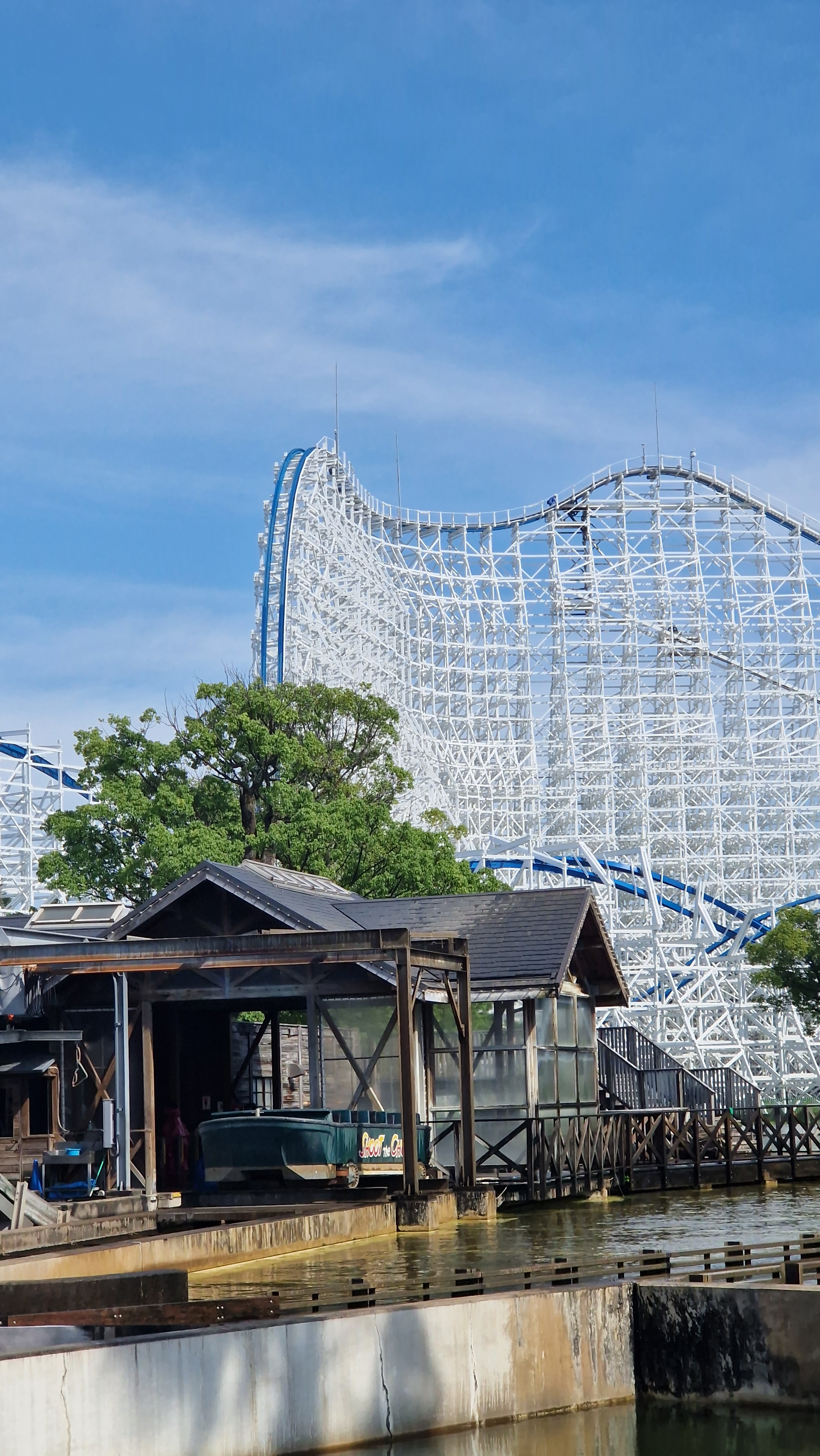
