= Grizzly (Kings Dominion) =

Wooden roller coaster in Virginia

- Previously known as The Grizzly (1982-1996)
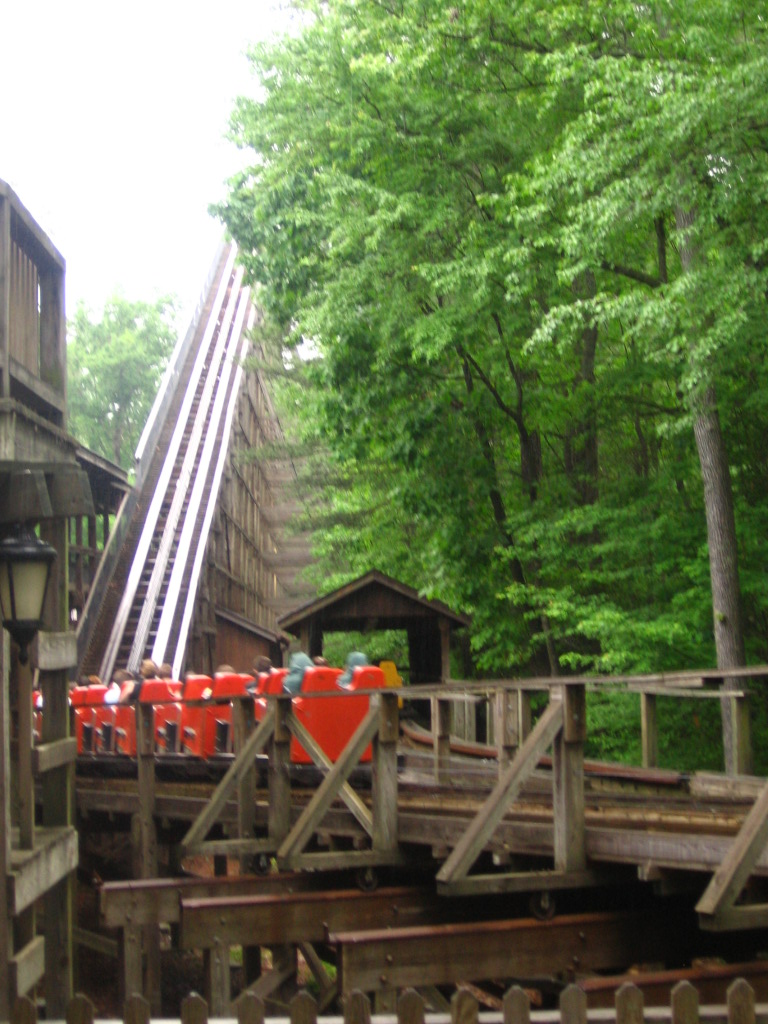
- A train on Grizzly approaching the lift hill

Kings Dominion
- Location: Kings Dominion
- Park section: Old Virginia
- Coordinates: 37°50′15″N 77°26′50″W
- Status: Operating
- Opening date: March 27, 1982

General statistics
- Type: Wood
- Manufacturer: Taft Attractions Group
- Designer: Curtis D. Summers
- Track layout: Out and Back/Figure 8
- Lift/launch system: Chain Lift
- Height: 87 ft (27 m)
- Length: 3,162 ft (964 m)
- Speed: 51 mph (82 km/h)
- Inversions: 0
- Duration: 2:30
- Max vertical angle: 55°
- Height restriction: 48 in (122 cm)
- Trains: 2 trains with 7 cars; riders arranged 2 across in 2 rows for a total of 28 riders per train
- Grizzly at RCDB

Grizzly is a wooden roller coaster at Kings Dominion in Doswell, Virginia. The grounds of the ride are densely forested, with the intended thrills heightened from the illusion of inadequate clearance between the track and trees. The attraction opened in 1982, and the double-figure-eight layout is based closely on the defunct Coney Island Wildcat. A similar version of this ride operates at Canada's Wonderland, California's Great America as Wilde Beast, and The Grizzly.

== History ==
The announcement by Kings Dominion that Grizzly would be ready to open for the 1982 season was made in a press release on March 15, 1982. The new coaster was intended to be the top thriller in the park, billed as "Taller than the park's most popular ride (Racer 75)" and "heaven for the real thrillseeker". Grizzly was designed by Curtis D. Summers, and is very similar to Wilde Beast at Canada's Wonderland, which he designed a year earlier. Both coasters are based on the Wildcat roller coaster (demolished in 1964) at the early Coney Island park in Cincinnati, Ohio. Media conglomerate Taft Broadcasting owned Coney Island at the time. The layout placed the coaster in the Old Virginia section of the park, winding mostly through the existing forest for the first half, then entering a large infield (which also held an employee parking area) for the second. The ride opened on March 27, 1982, and was closed for portions of the 2009 and 2011 seasons for retracking.

Front row POV of the track cresting the lift hill

Grizzly was given a refurbishment in 2016. The first and second hills were entirely retracked with fresh new wood and brand new running rails. Moreover, the station floor was completely redone. The old floor made out of laminated plywood sheets was replaced with fresh, sturdy wooden planks.

After Labor Day 2022, Grizzly closed for major refurbishment by The Gravity Group. 1,040 feet of the ride was retracked to provide a smoother ride experience. The first drop was increased from 45 to 55 degrees and the fan turn after the tunnel was reprofiled to include a smoother transition. The ride's overall length was slightly increased by 12 feet (3.6 m) to 3,162 feet (964 m) and reopened on the 13th of May, 2023. This retrack was successful, as the ride experience is much smoother and more comfortable than before.

== Theming ==
The attraction is not definitively themed, attempting instead to immerse the riders in a setting that resembles the natural habitat of the grizzly bear. The entire attraction is deep in the woods, far from the nearest paths. This not only hides the coaster from the rest of the park, making it impossible for guests to visually gauge the thrill they are about to experience, but psychologically supports the idea of entering an isolated wilderness. The station and support building architecture is faux timber-framed cabin style, and the color scheme is exclusively brown and woodgrain. The roller coaster itself is stained a gray-brown natural woodtone, and the trains are orange and yellow. At the entrance of the long queue, there is a large simulated stone carving of a grizzly bear, and originally a sign with the name and logo of the attraction. Since the sign's removal sometime prior to May 2008, the attraction's name was not publicly displayed anywhere near or on the grounds of the roller coaster until July 2009 when a new sign was posted near the queue entrance of the ride. In April 2019, the Grizzly Gulch themed gift shop was added along the path to the ride, replacing the Dinosaurs Alive gift shop, acting as the entrance. Outside of the gift shops entrance, there's signs that act as theming, and say things such as "There's a Grizzly in the woods!" With the s being backwards

== Rankings ==
Golden Ticket Awards: Top wood Roller Coasters
| Year | | | | | | | | | 1998 | 1999 |
|---|---|---|---|---|---|---|---|---|---|---|
| Ranking | | | | | | | | | 14 | 17 |
| Year | 2000 | 2001 | 2002 | 2003 | 2004 | 2005 | 2006 | 2007 | 2008 | 2009 |
| Ranking | 25 | 26 | 29 | 32 | 36 (tie) | 37 | 41 (tie) | – | 42 | – |
| Year | 2010 | 2011 | 2012 | 2013 | 2014 | 2015 | 2016 | 2017 | 2018 | 2019 |
| Ranking | 45 | – | – | – | – | – | – | 46 | 40 | 50 |
| Year | 2020 | 2021 | 2022 | 2023 | 2024 | 2025 | 2026 | | | |
| Ranking | N/A | – | – | – | – | 17 | 23 | | | |

== See also ==
- The Bush Beast
- The Grizzly
- Wilde Beast
