= Wonderland Sydney =

Theme park in Sydney, New South Wales, Australia

- Interactive map of Wonderland Sydney
- Location: Eastern Creek, New South Wales, Australia
- Coordinates: 33.80119°S 150.84754°E
- Opened: 7 December 1985
- Closed: 26 April 2004
- Owner: Kings Entertainment Company (1985–1996); Sunway Group (1997–2004)
- Slogan: "Greatest Fun You'll Ever Have" (1985–1986); "Too Much Fun To Have In One Day" (1987–1988); "Wouldn't it be wonderful if the world was Wonderland’ (1988–1995); "No Wonder They Call It Wonderland" (1995–1998); "Get Out Of Everydayland" (1998–2001)
- Operating season: Year round
- Area: 219 ha (540 acres)

Attractions
- Total: 24 at peak
- Roller coasters: 3

Wonderland Sydney (originally Australia's Wonderland) was an amusement park in Eastern Creek, Sydney, Australia that operated from 1985 until 2004. It was the largest park by land area in the southern hemisphere.

== History ==
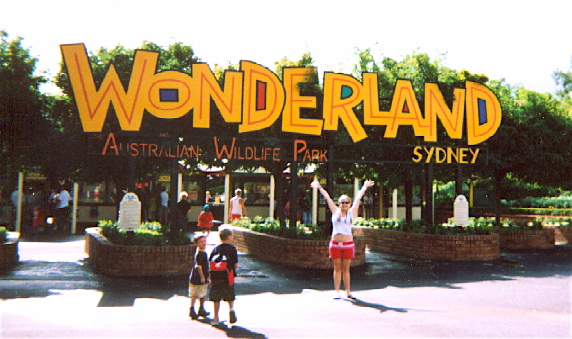
The entrance gate

Wonderland Sydney, then known as Australia's Wonderland was opened on 7 December 1985 by the Premier of New South Wales, Neville Wran,

It was built with financial backing from the New South Wales State Superannuation Board, James Hardie, Leighton Holdings and Taft Broadcasting (through Kings Entertainment Company) at Eastern Creek on the junction of Wallgrove Road and the M4 Motorway. The developers sought to provide an alternative to the troubled Luna Park Sydney, which had opened and closed multiple times in its recent history. The area would also see the opening of Eastern Creek Raceway in 1990 as the Sydney metropolitan area expanded to the west.

Wonderland opened with three separate themed areas within the park: 'Goldrush', 'Medieval Faire' (later renamed Old Botany Bay), and 'Hanna-Barbera Land' (later renamed 'Little Wonders Land' in 2001–2002) which featured rides and attractions based on characters from Hanna-Barbera animation shows such as Yogi Bear, Scooby-Doo and The Flintstones. The park was modelled heavily around Canada's Wonderland, a theme park located north of Toronto, with both parks being constructed by Taft Broadcasting, a company which also owned Hanna-Barbera.

For many years, Wonderland's flagship ride was 'The Bush Beast' which was the largest wooden roller coaster in Australia. Australia's Wonderland also claimed that it was the largest wooden rollercoaster in the Southern Hemisphere. 'The Beastie', a smaller version of The Bush Beast which catered to younger riders, was also one of the original rides. The park would later add rides such as the 'Demon' (1992) and 'Space Probe 7' (1995; sponsored by the Seven Network, who bought naming rights to the ride. After this contract expired, the ride dropped the '7' from its name).

Australia's Wonderland expanded, and rebranded as Wonderland Sydney it featured an all-new water park known as 'The Beach', which first opened in 1988. Unlike the rest of the park, which remained open year-round, The Beach was a seasonal attraction which closed during the winter months (June–September). In 1990 Wonderland opened the 'Australian Wildlife Park'. Another attraction named 'The Outback Woolshed' was added in 1995, along with an à-la-carte-style restaurant.

== Ownership and acquisitions ==
Logo when the park was known as Australia's Wonderland, used from its foundation in 1985 until 1997.

In 1992, all of the Taft Broadcasting Parks were sold to Viacom and re-branded as Paramount Parks. However, Taft only had a minority stake in Australia's Wonderland and sold its stake to other Australian investors. Today, the five Paramount Parks continue successful operation, purchased in 2006 by amusement park operator Cedar Fair.

Many of Australia's Wonderland's rides correlate to the rides at the former Paramount Parks still in operation today. The Bush Beast was identical in layout to the Wild Beast at Canada's Wonderland and Grizzly at Kings Dominion.

The park was sold in 1997 to the Kuala Lumpur-based Sunway Group. Only one ride, Skyrider which was the former cable car at the Sydney Showground, was added between the 1997 takeover and the park's closure.

=== Closure ===
CEO Stephen Galbraith stated the September 11 attacks, the 2002 Bali bombings, the collapse of HIH Insurance, the SARS virus, the bird flu virus, consistent losses on the Asian financial crisis, the collapse of Ansett Australia, the Iraq War and the 2003 bushfires all contributed to the park's closure. Sydney Morning Herald stated that Sunway Group "blames Wonderland's demise on everything except poor management".

The gates shut for the last time on 26 April 2004, the day after the Anzac Day public holiday, and a complete demolition of the park was undertaken in September 2005. Most of the rides were sold to other amusement parks, while 'The Bush Beast', 'The Beastie' and 'The Snowy River Rampage' were demolished. A former employee made a list of what happened to some of the rides. Two of the park's camels were adopted by a family in Goulburn.

The entry way signage at the time of closure, featuring Spider-Man and The Incredible Hulk, was sold to a junkyard in Londonderry in Sydney's north west.

The site itself has since been turned into Interchange Park, an industrial estate, where remnants of the park remain in the surrounding bushland. One of the streets through the site retains the name "Wonderland Drive".

== Rides ==
=== Roller coasters ===
- 'The Beastie' – opened 1985–2002. Half the size and height of The Bush Beast, The Beastie was a wooden roller coaster designed for younger riders. The ride was 460 metres in length, and ran with two 20-rider trains. The Beastie was located in Little Wonders Land/Hanna-Barbera Land. In 2002, the Little Wonders Land area of the park was permanently closed, as the overall park was too big with rides spaced too far apart.
- 'The Bush Beast' – opened 1985. A 975-metre long wooden roller coaster that was based on the Wild Beast at Canada's Wonderland. The coaster operated with two trains, each capable of carrying 28 people. It was the tallest wooden roller coaster in the southern hemisphere, until the construction of Montezum at Hopi Hari in Brazil in 1999.
- 'The Demon' – opened 1992. A Vekoma Boomerang steel roller coaster. The Demon was installed in 1992, after having previously operated at Expo '88 (under the name Titan). After Wonderland closed, it was dismantled and sold to Alabama Adventure where it operated from 2005 until 2011 as the Zoomerang. The ride closed in 2011 and in 2013 was relocated to Wonderla, Bengaluru as the Recoil in India.

=== Amusement rides ===
- 'Antique Autos' – opened 1985. An electric track used to propel scaled-down Ford Model T cars through themed scenery.
- 'Bounty's Revenge' – opened 1985. A large inverting pirate ship. Bounty's Revenge could carry 50 riders at a time, in ten rows of five seats. At the time of its opening it was only the second of its kind in the world.
- 'Dragon's Flight' – opened 1985. A large Wave Swinger (similar to the Chair-O-Planes ride).
- 'Fred Flintstone's Splashdown' – opened 1994. A log flume ride.
- 'Galleon's Graveyard' – opened 1987 as "Captain Caveman's Clippers." Given the current name after being relocated to Transylvania, following the closure of Little Wonders Land/Hanna-Barbera Land. Similar to a scaled-down Chair-O-Planes, riders were instead seated in two-seater 'flying boats'.
- 'Great Balloon Race'
- 'HMS Endeavour' – opened 1985. Originally known as Sea Demon, HMS Endeavour received its later name when the ride was moved in 1990 to the old location of the Funnel Web.
- 'Jousting Ring' – opened 1985. A dodgem hall.
- 'Little Monsters Flying School' – opened in 1985 as Dastardly's Flying Circus.
- 'Magilla Gorilla's Flotillas' – opened 1985. A small lake equipped with paddle boats. Closed in 1990 to make way for the Australian Wildlife Park.
- 'Ned Kelly's Getaway' – opened 1985. A steep sled slide, finishing in water. Closed in 1998.
- 'Funnel Web' – opened in 1985, and removed in 1990.
- 'Scooby's Silly Stix' – opened in 1985. Removed in 2000.
- 'Skyhawk' – opened 1991. A 'Parachute Tower' built by Vekoma, the Skyhawk consisted of four cars; two for sitting passengers, two for standing. The four cars would be pulled to the top of a 30-metre tower, then released. A parachute would then allow riders to slowly descend to the ground. The ride was sold in 2005 to Fly Coaster, a small Gold Coast park
- 'Skyway' – opened 1997. The only ride installed after the Sunway Group acquisition of the park, the Skyway was the old cable car from the old Sydney Showground stretching from Goldrush to Hanna-Barbera Land. The ride closed in 2002.
- 'Snowy River Rampage' – opened 1985. A 960-metre River Rapid designed by Intamin. Riders would sit in a 6-person raft resembling a large tire and float down a wide winding river with occasional water cannons which fired straight up in the air when the raft approached.
- 'Space Probe' – opened November 1995. Originally known as Space Probe 7 (due to sponsorship from the Seven Network). The Intamin Giant Drop was installed in 1995 and was similar to the Giant Drop at Dreamworld on the Gold Coast. As its passengers are raised to the top of the tower, the car would enter a fully enclosed area (unique to this type of ride) within, TV screens would display a countdown. The riders were dropped at random – a few seconds before the countdown reached zero, or held till after the countdown had finished.
- 'Tasmanian Devil' – opened 1985. A large wheel-shaped machine which lay on one of its faces, with several rocking rider cars attached around the circumference. During main operation of the ride, the ride spins so fast that the rider cars rise in the air, so the rider is horizontally parallel to the ground.
- 'Wizard's Fury' – opened 1985. Relocated from Kings Island. A Bayern Kurve ride, where a train of carriages is propelled around a circular track at ground level. The track passes over a steeply ascending and descending section housed within a themed building. A single ride consisted of twenty to thirty revolutions around the circular track. Removed 2002.
- 'Zodiac' – opened 1989. Relocated from Kings Island. A double Ferris wheel designed by Intamin, Zodiac consisted of 24 gondolas mounted on either end of a large hydraulic arm. Zodiac would be operated so that while one wheel was rotating at 58 metres in height, the 12 cars of the opposing arm would all be on the ground and taking on riders simultaneously. When loaded, the hydraulic arm would be moved, lowering those who had been in the air back to the ground.

There was a miniature golf course called Top Cat's Putt Putt Park; prior to the installation of Fred Flintstone's Splashdown there was a putting course known as Old McScrappy's Golfing Farm.

The closure of several rides in 2002 was due to the reduction in operational area of the park. Visitors were told that the rides were being relocated to the remaining sections, so that they would be closer (as the rides were spaced apart). Some of the rides were moved, whereas others were scrapped.

== Shows ==
Produced by Kings Entertainment Company. Park Musical Supervisor for the 1985–1986 opening season was Derek Williams.

- Blinky Bill (2004) – final performance.
- Millennium Magic (1999–2004) – Tony & Juleen Laffan
- Action Man Lives (2001)
- Toohey's Tall Ship – Pirate Show (1985–2000)
- Hanna-Barbera Gala Celebrity Night (1997)
- Magic Spectacular (1992–1993) – Timothy Hyde & The Amazing Lynda
- The Wiggles (1993–2001)
- Fireworks – Every Saturday Night/During the School Holidays
- Solid Gold (1985–1986) inaugural season (Musical Director: Derek Williams)
- The Powerpuff Girls: Saving the World Before Bedtime (2002) A musical play based on the 1998-2005 cartoon.

== Rebuilding proposal ==
Property developer, and former employee of Wonderland Sydney, Ammar Khan, announced plans to develop a new amusement, entertainment and retail attraction to be named Sydney’s Wonderland in Western Sydney and has been seeking financial backing for the relaunch since 2009. Plans for the park include a water park, a wildlife park and the return of the Wonderland. While Khan does not have a site for the Park he plans that it would occupy a site around 300 acres in and around Eastern Creek or towards Hoxton Park. According to Khan, the construction of the Park would take three years. In September 2015 the proposal received financial backing with a $1 billion cash injection from a consortium of investors via the multinational, Fox Petroleum Limited but there has been no further action on the project since then.

== See also ==
- List of defunct amusement parks
