= The Bush Beast =

Wooden roller coaster in Australia (1985–2004)

Wonderland Sydney
- Location: Wonderland Sydney
- Coordinates: 33.800767°S 150.851250°E
- Status: Removed
- Opening date: 7 December 1985
- Closing date: 26 April 2004

General statistics
- Type: Wood – Out and back
- Manufacturer: Taft Broadcasting
- Track layout: Double Out and back Figure 8
- Lift/launch system: Chain lift hill
- Height: 27.5 m (90 ft)
- Length: 975.3 m (3,200 ft)
- Speed: 90 km/h (56 mph)
- Inversions: 0
- Duration: 2:30
- Capacity: 880 riders per hour
- Trains: 2 trains with 7 cars. Riders are arranged 2 across in 2 rows for a total of 28 riders per train.
- The Bush Beast at RCDB

The Bush Beast was a wooden roller coaster located at Wonderland Sydney in Australia. The ride opened with the park on 7 December 1985 and closed with the park on 26 April 2004. The ride features a mirrored layout to that of other wooden roller coasters located at California's Great America, Canada's Wonderland, and Kings Dominion. The Bush Beast was manufactured by Taft Broadcasting.

== See also ==
- The Grizzly
- Grizzly (Kings Dominion)
- Wilde Beast
