= Don Helbig =

American publicist

Don Helbig (born in Cincinnati, Ohio) is best known as a Kings Island enthusiast who holds several riding records at the park, including a Guinness world record for the most nonconsecutive rides on a roller coaster. He later became the public relations manager for Kings Island in 2007, and was so until 2023.

As of 2014, Helbig has taken over 12,000 rides on The Racer, generally recognized as a world record. Helbig was hired as the Kings Island public relations manager in 2007. He has also been a broadcaster and media relations director working in professional ice hockey, winning the American Hockey League's Ken McKenzie Award in 2003. During his years in pro hockey, Helbig worked for the Cincinnati Tigers, Cincinnati Cyclones, Carolina Monarchs, Cincinnati Mighty Ducks and the Albany River Rats. He also spent one season as the broadcaster for the Albany Conquest of the af2.

Helbig began his pursuit of setting records on the Racer on June 15, 1981. Employed at the time as a novelty vendor for the Cincinnati Reds, he found free time during a Major League Baseball strike that lasted nearly two months. Initially, Helbig wanted to attain the single day park record for rides on the Racer, which was previously 96 set in 1976. On August 9, 1981, he broke the record finishing the day with 97 rides. On September 1, 1982, he broke his own record with 111 rides. Years later on September 2, 1987, he established the current record of 112. In addition to the single-day riding record, Helbig also pursued the goal of reaching 10,000 nonconsecutive rides – a feat he accomplished by 1990.

The endeavor brought attention from the national news media on his milestone rides (1,000, 2,000, etc.). Helbig continued to ride the Racer almost daily throughout the 1980s, accruing a single-season high of 2,211 rides in 1982, while mixing in more than 3,000 rides on the legendary Beast roller coaster and enjoying Kings Island's live shows. He is a member of American Coaster Enthusiasts and wrote reviews of amusement park books for the club's quarterly newsletter.

In 2004, Kings Island held a "Don Helbig Day" in honor of his 1,000th visit to the park. Helbig has appeared live on Good Morning America, been on Entertainment Tonight, and has been featured in the pages of numerous newspapers and media outlets including Star Magazine and USA Today.
