= The Racer (Kings Island) =

Amusement ride in Ohio, United States

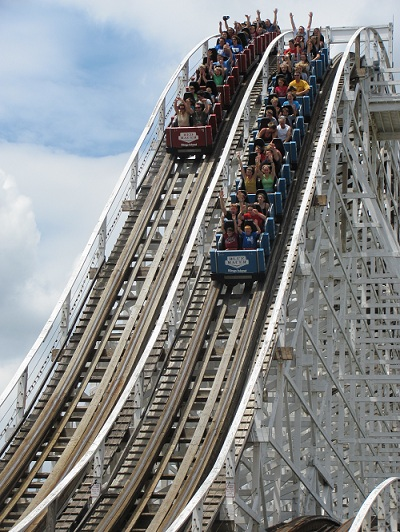
- The Racer's first drop

Kings Island
- Park section: Coney Mall
- Coordinates: 39.343728°N 84.264692°W
- Status: Operating
- Opening date: April 29, 1972
- Cost: $1,200,000

General statistics
- Type: Wood – Racing
- Manufacturer: Philadelphia Toboggan Coasters
- Designer: John C. Allen
- Track layout: Out and back
- Lift/launch system: Chain
	Blue	Red
Height	88 ft (26.8 m)	88 ft (26.8 m)
Drop	82.17 ft (25.0 m)	82.17 ft (25.0 m)
Length	3,415 ft (1,040.9 m)	3,415 ft (1,040.9 m)
Speed	53 mph (85.3 km/h)	53 mph (85.3 km/h)
Inversions	0	0
Duration	2:00	2:00
Max vertical angle	45°	45°
- Capacity: 1800 riders per hour
- Height restriction: 48 in (122 cm)
- Trains: 4 trains with 5 cars. Riders are arranged 2 across in 3 rows for a total of 30 riders per train.
- Fast Lane available
- The Racer at RCDB; Pictures of The Racer at RCDB

The Racer is a wooden racing roller coaster located at Kings Island amusement park in Mason, Ohio. It was designed by John C. Allen, well known for his contributions to roller coasters during the mid-twentieth century, and debuted at the park's grand opening in 1972. It was thrust into the national spotlight after being featured in an episode of the popular TV sitcom The Brady Bunch in 1973 and is often recognized for playing a vital role in the roller coaster renaissance of the 1970s. The Racer inspired similar designs in other roller coasters, such as Racer 75 (formerly Rebel Yell) at Kings Dominion and the now-defunct Thunder Road at Carowinds. The Racer is also one of the few original Kings Island attractions still in operation today.

== History ==
Following a very successful decade, the first major era of roller coasters in the United States would come to an end in the 1930s as the economy struggled during the Great Depression. Although new roller coasters were still being built, the demand wouldn't be the same for decades to come. By the 1960s, the industry was at an all-time low. Traditional amusement park rides, such as carousels, mill chutes, and even wooden roller coasters, were losing popularity with newer generations. This led the president of Philadelphia Toboggan Company and well-known coaster designer, John C. Allen, to decide in 1968 that it was time to retire. Allen was one of the last remaining designers with experience from the first golden age of roller coasters, having studied under legendary designer Herbert Schmeck.

The Wachs' family owned and operated Cincinnati's Coney Island before selling to Taft Broadcasting in 1969, but they remained in control of park operations and made many decisions during the construction of Kings Island. Determined to recapture some of Coney Island's traditional themes at the new park, Gary Wachs and his father met Allen in 1970 at an IAAPA convention in Chicago. They convinced Allen to officially come out of retirement and design a roller coaster that would be as popular as Shooting Star at Coney Island, but also unique at the same time.

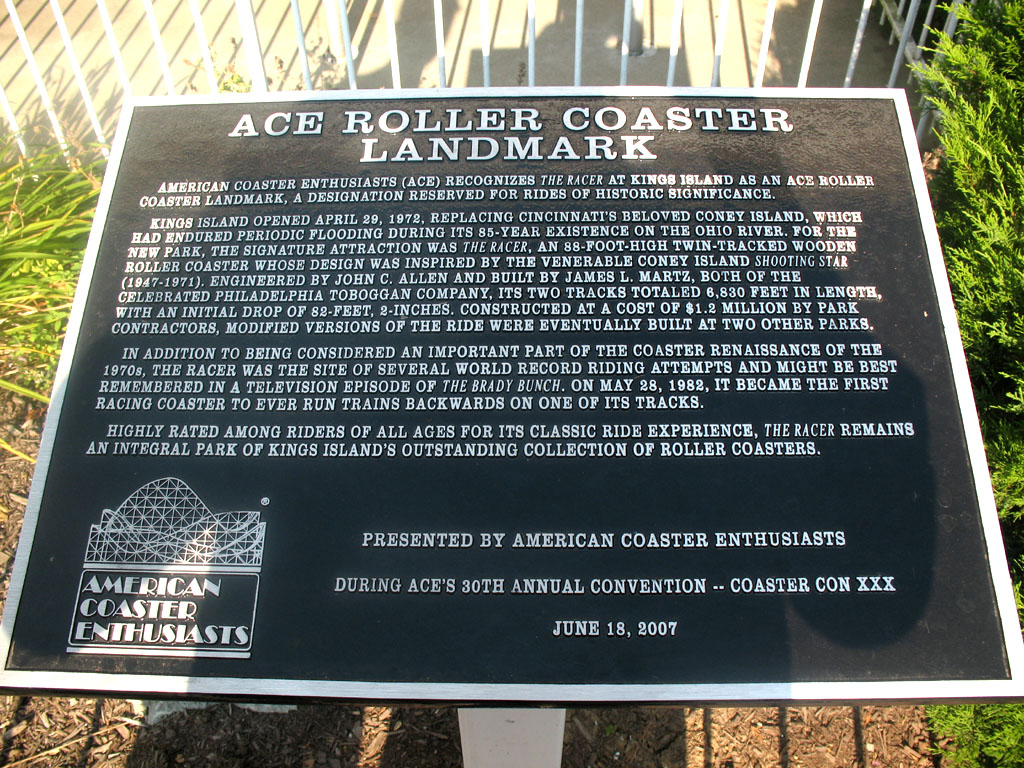
ACE plaque located near entrance

Construction of the attraction began in 1970. The first test runs were conducted in September 1971. The Racer opened officially to the public at Kings Island's grand opening on April 28, 1972. It is located in Coney Mall, a section of the park originally known as Coney Island. The roller coaster appeared on national television in 1973, when it was featured in an episode of The Brady Bunch called "The Cincinnati Kids". The ride ignited interest in roller coasters following decades of decline, and the attention it received eventually led to a revival of the industry around the world, typically referred to as the industry's second golden age.

Both sides of the track raced forward until May 28, 1982, when the trains on the right track were reversed to ride backwards. The Racer became the first racing roller coaster in the world to do so. It is thought that this move was to accommodate guests who were frustrated over the frequent closure of The Bat, a recently added attraction. Though only intended for the remainder of the 1982 operating season, the change lasted twenty-six years due to its popularity. It wasn't until 2008 that Cedar Fair restored the ride to its original form by changing the right track to ride forward again. In addition, each side was assigned a color—red and blue—with the red trains on the right and the blue trains on the left.

On June 18, 2007, The Racer was awarded the Coaster Landmark Award by the American Coaster Enthusiasts (ACE). A plaque for the award is on display near the ride's entrance.

As part of a routine, annual maintenance program common with wooden coasters, sections of the ride are occasionally retracked over the years as needed. For the 2019 season, the back turns and several other small sections were retracked by Great Coasters International, the company behind Kings Island's Mystic Timbers in 2017. The first drop and turns out of the station were refurbished previously several years earlier. Then, in 2021, The Gravity Group replaced 500 feet (150 m) of track stretching from the base of the first drop to the fourth airtime hill to allow for a smoother ride experience. That year, the original entrance sign and train logos were restored. During the 2021-2022 off-season, the ride got repainted for the park's 50th anniversary celebration.

== Design ==
POV video of the Blue Racer

The Racer features an out-and-back roller coaster layout with two identical tracks that run parallel to one another. Unlike earlier racing coasters, Allen took the unique approach of splitting both tracks apart into separate structures before the first turn. The design allows for two trains to race similarly from start to finish, making similar turns and traversing the same length. Previously, racing designs would keep both tracks side-by-side throughout the entire course of the ride.

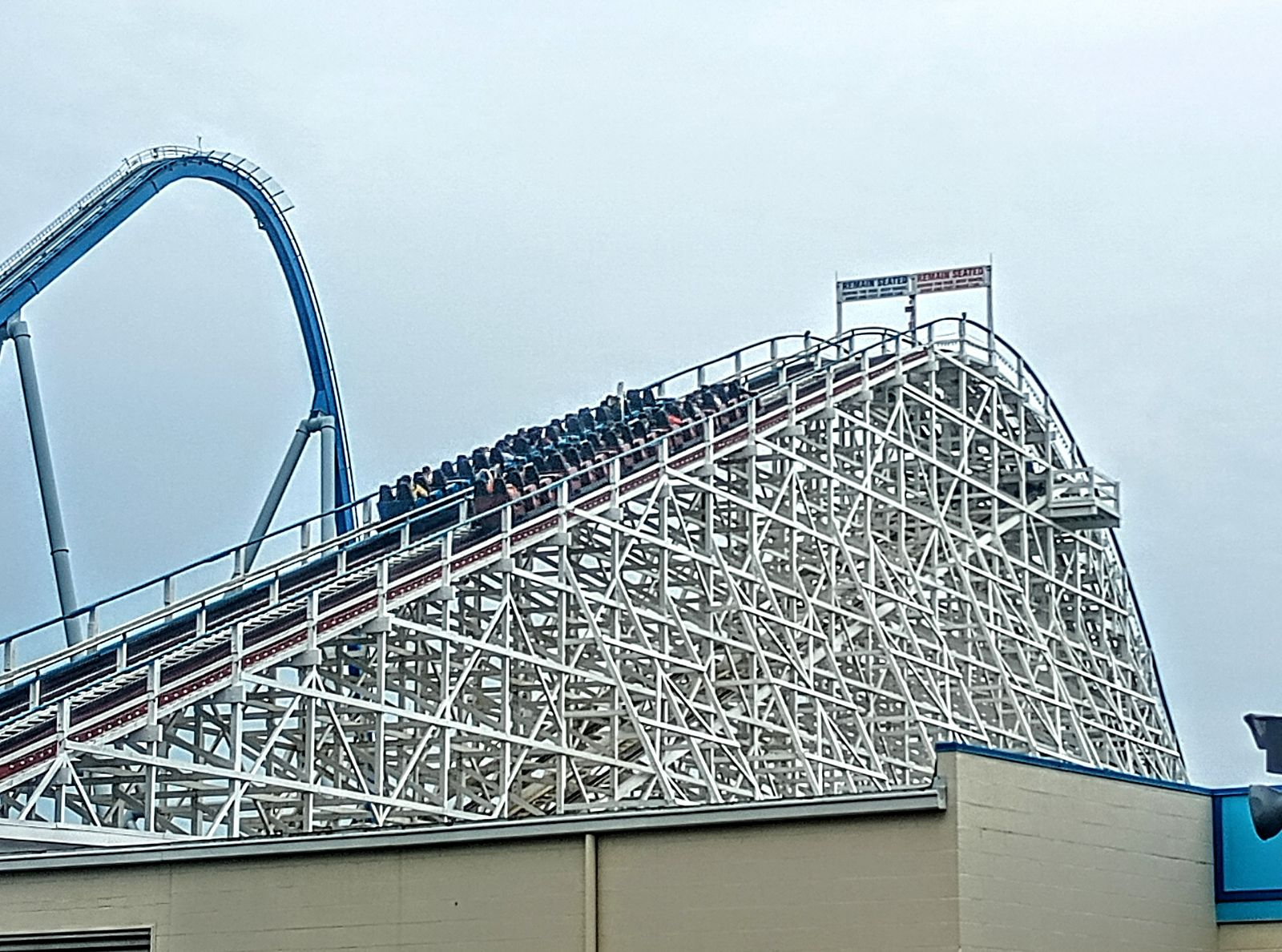
The Racer at its right side

After leaving the station, trains pass through turnarounds, travel over transfer tracks, and merge at the base of the lift hill. They ascend an 88-foot-tall (27 m) lift hill, followed by an 88-foot (27 m) first drop and two small airtime hills. The trains then reach a large airtime hill, also known as a camelback, before splitting up into separate structures. After splitting, each train passes over another small airtime hill before rising into a turnaround to begin the return trip. After descending the turnaround hill, the trains reach a medium hill where the tracks rejoin the main structure. They race back over a series of smaller hills until reaching the final brake run at the station.

An early concept differed from the final version, which had both lift hills split apart. Trains would then enter a spiraling drop and race through a series of airtime hills along the outside of the track. At the turnaround, the tracks turned toward one another, creating a near-miss element as the tracks joined up, allowing the trains to race side-by-side back to the station. Another early concept was closer to the final version, except the camelback hill at the split was positioned after the turnaround instead of before it.

== Trivia ==
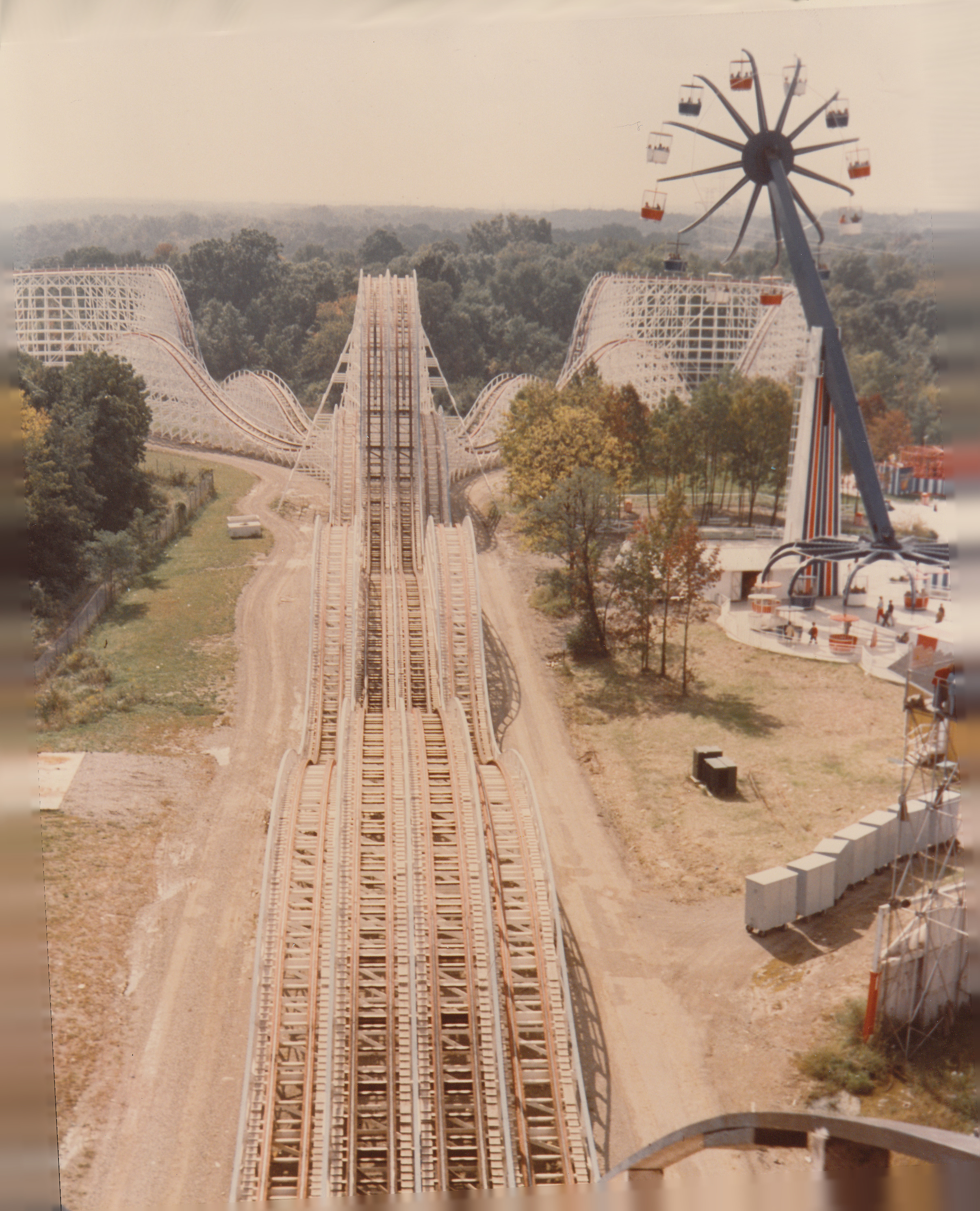
The Racer in 1972 with the now-defunct Zodiac to the right.

The Racer is one of four wooden roller coasters within the park. The other three are The Beast, Woodstock Express, and Mystic Timbers.

Don Helbig holds several park records. Among these, he holds the record for the most times riding the Racer, which as of 2008 was nearly 12,000.
