= Hydra the Revenge =

Floorless coaster in Pennsylvania, US

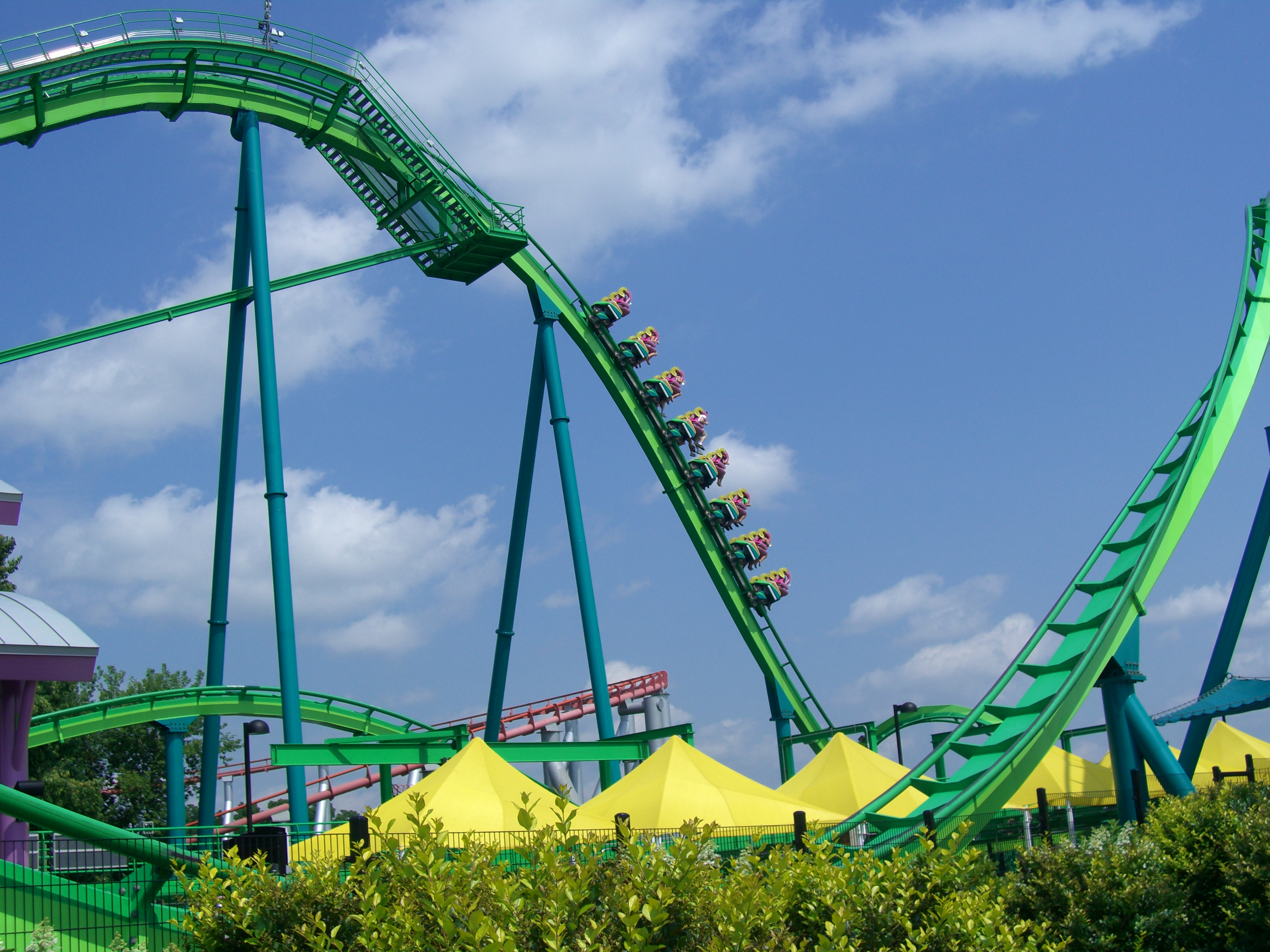
- Hydra's first drop at Dorney Park & Wildwater Kingdom in Allentown, Pennsylvania

Dorney Park & Wildwater Kingdom
- Location: Dorney Park & Wildwater Kingdom
- Coordinates: 40.5810°N 75.5325°W
- Status: Operating
- Soft opening date: March 24, 2005
- Opening date: May 7, 2005
- Cost: $13 million
- Replaced: Hercules

General statistics
- Type: Steel – Floorless Coaster
- Manufacturer: Bolliger & Mabillard
- Designer: Werner Stengel
- Model: Floorless Coaster
- Track layout: Twister
- Lift/launch system: Chain lift hill
- Height: 95 ft (29 m)
- Drop: 105 ft (32 m)
- Length: 3,198 ft (975 m)
- Speed: 53 mph (85 km/h)
- Inversions: 7
- Duration: 2:35
- Max vertical angle: 68°
- Capacity: 1,245 riders per hour
- Height restriction: 54 in (137 cm)
- Trains: 2 trains with 8 cars; riders arranged 4 across in a single row for a total of 32 riders per train
- Fast Lane available
- Hydra the Revenge at RCDB

Hydra the Revenge, or simply Hydra, is a steel Floorless Coaster at Dorney Park & Wildwater Kingdom in Dorneyville, Pennsylvania. Manufactured by Bolliger & Mabillard, the coaster opened to the public on May 7, 2005. Hydra was built on the site of the former wooden coaster Hercules, which was closed and demolished at the end of the park's 2003 season. The ride's name comes from the mythological Greek story where Hercules battled the Lernaean Hydra.

== History ==
On September 3, 2003, Dorney Park announced that Hercules would not reopen for the 2004 season. The ride's last day of operation was on Labor Day, and site preparation began soon after. On September 14, 2004, the park revealed plans to build Hydra the Revenge at a cost of $13 million. Construction began in the spring of 2004 and continued through the winter. Hydra the Revenge was topped off on August 20, 2004 and the entire track layout was completed on December 4, 2004. The first cars for the coaster arrived at Dorney Park on December 10, 2004, and the first ride with guests on a train took place on March 24, 2005. The roller coaster officially opened to the public on May 7, 2005.

=== Backstory ===
The name of the roller coaster comes from the story of Hercules in Greek mythology. According to the story, Hercules defeated the Hydra, a nine-headed creature with eight serpentine heads that would regrow each time they were cut off, including one that was immortal. Dorney Park altered the remainder of the story — after Hercules defeated the Hydra's first eight heads, he could not kill the immortal head. He instead buried it deep underground beneath a giant stone, with the intention of sealing it for the rest of time. However, over the course of many years, the head slowly grew back the rest of its body, and eventually was resurrected. The Hydra took its revenge on Hercules by killing him; hence why Hydra the Revenge sits where Hercules once did.

== Ride experience ==
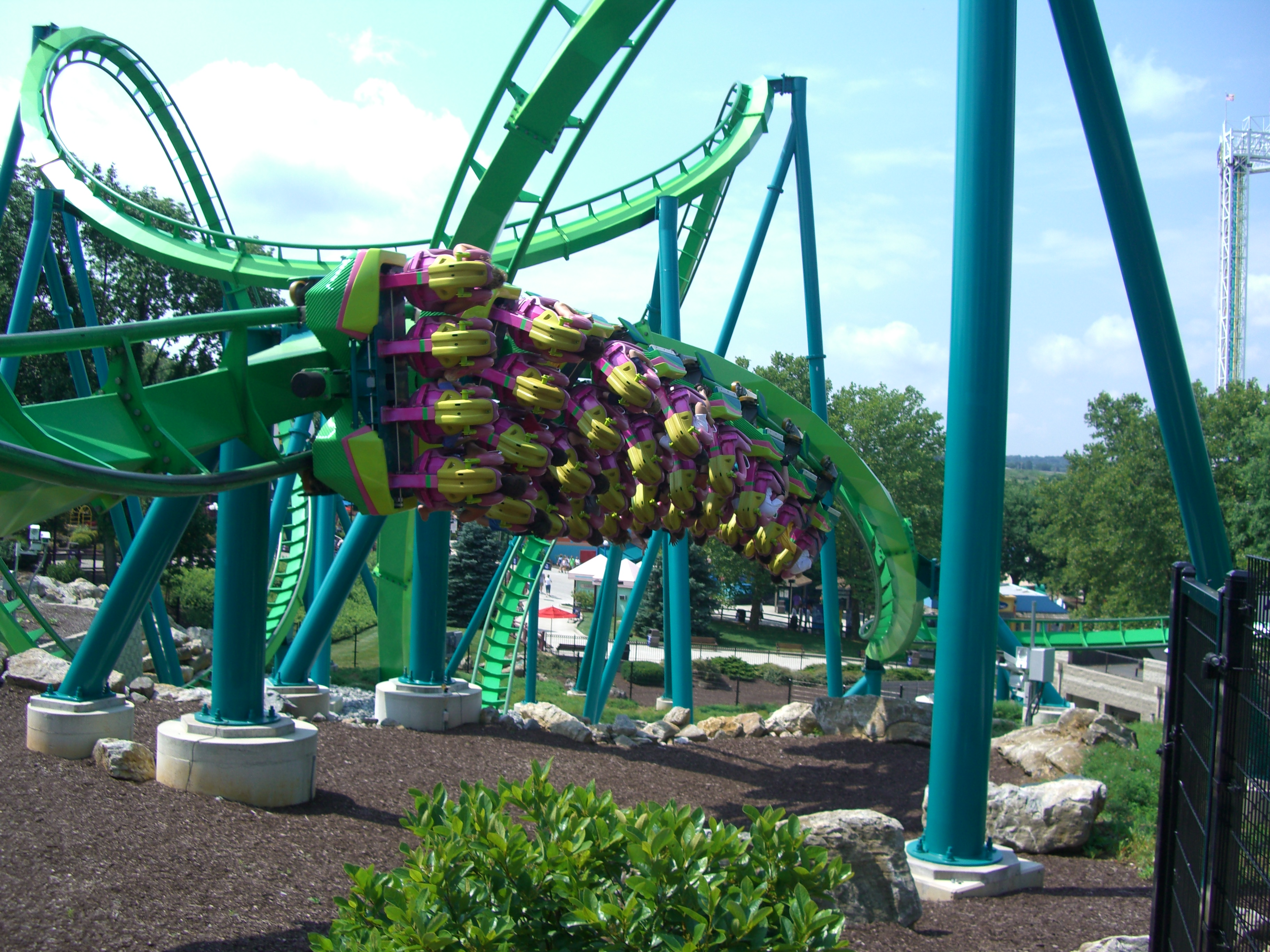
Hydra the Revenge's heartline roll

Once the floor drops and the front gate opens, the train is dispatched leading straight into the first inversion; a heartline roll, nicknamed the "Jojo Roll". Upon exiting the roll, the train makes a 180 degree right turn and begins to climb the 95-foot (29 m) lift hill. Once at the top, the train drops down 105 feet (32 m) at a 68-degree angle. Then, the train makes a slight right turn into a 62-foot (19 m) inclined dive loop before going through a zero-gravity roll. Immediately after the roll, the train enters the first of two corkscrews. After exiting the corkscrew, the train then goes through a cobra roll. After an upward left turn, followed by a downward right turn, the train goes over an airtime hill before entering the second corkscrew. The train then makes a 360 degree left turn, followed by a banked 90-degree right turn which leads into the final brake run and back into the station. The ride's duration is about 2 minutes and 35 seconds.

== Characteristics ==
=== Trains ===
Hydra the Revenge operates with two steel and fiberglass trains. Each train has eight cars that can seat four riders in a single row for a total of 32 riders per train. Each train has two shades of green and pink on the bottom section, while the seats and over-the-shoulder restraints are pink. Each seat has an over-the-shoulder harness with an interlocking seatbelt. The trains have no floor, as the riders' legs dangle above the track.

=== Track ===
The steel track of Hydra the Revenge is approximately 3,198 feet (975 m) long, the height of the lift hill is approximately 95 feet (29 m) high, and the entire track weighs about 1,368,000 pounds (621,000 kg). It was manufactured by Clermont Steel Fabricators located in Batavia, Ohio. The track has two shades of green while the supports are turquoise.

== Reception ==
Jeremy Thompson from Roller Coaster Philosophy said that "the ride itself is okay, but I’m not sure if I really loved the whole experience...still, it’s got a more interesting layout." A group of roller coaster enthusiasts also came to the conclusion that "...it's a good, but not quite great, ride that's perfect for family-oriented Dorney."
