= Racer 75 =

Roller coaster at Kings Dominion

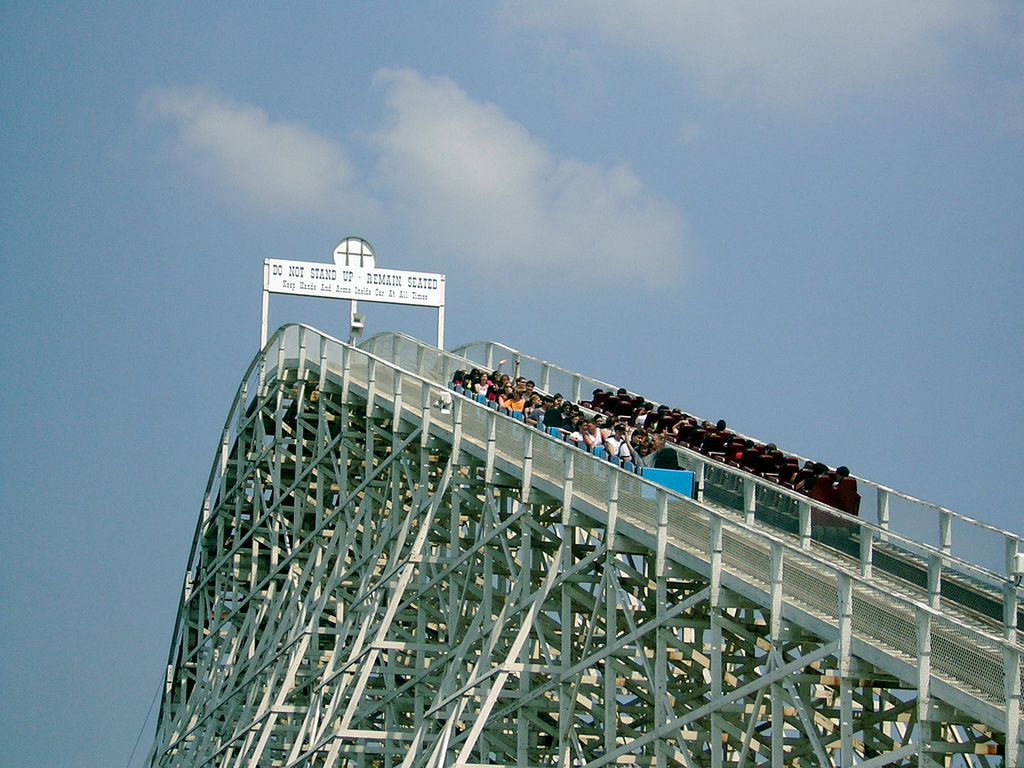
- Rebel Yell (now Racer 75) lift hill in 2005
- Previously known as Rebel Yell (1975–2017)

Kings Dominion
- Park section: Candy Apple Grove
- Coordinates: 37°50′13.5″N 77°26′41.8″W
- Status: Operating
- Opening date: May 3, 1975; 51 years ago
- Cost: $1.5 Million

General statistics
- Type: Wood – Racing
- Manufacturer: Philadelphia Toboggan Coasters
- Designer: John C. Allen
- Model: Wooden
- Track layout: Out and back
- Lift/launch system: Chain
	North	South
Height	85 ft (25.9 m)	85 ft (25.9 m)
Drop	81 ft (24.7 m)	81 ft (24.7 m)
Length	3,368.5 ft (1,026.7 m)	3,368.5 ft (1,026.7 m)
Speed	56 mph (90.1 km/h)	56 mph (90.1 km/h)
Inversions	0	0
Duration	2:15	2:15
Max vertical angle	50°	50°
G-force	4.2	4.2
- Capacity: 1200 riders per hour
- Height restriction: 48 in (122 cm)
- Trains: 4 trains with 5 cars. Riders are arranged 2 across in 3 rows for a total of 30 riders per train.
- Racer 75 at RCDB; Pictures of Racer 75 at RCDB

Racer 75 is a wooden racing roller coaster at Kings Dominion in Doswell, Virginia. Designed by John C. Allen, it opened with the park in 1975 as Rebel Yell, and features a track layout similar to The Racer (1972) at Kings Island and now-defunct Thunder Road at Carowinds (1976). In 2018, Rebel Yell was renamed Racer 75 to avoid any connection to the Confederacy, to reflect its racing coaster design and opening date, and as a subtle nod to the American Coaster Enthusiasts (ACE) organization that was founded in 1978.

== History ==
Racer 75 opened as Rebel Yell with Kings Dominion's grand opening in 1975. Jim Copp, Kings Dominion's first vice president of finance and administration, named the coaster after Rebel Yell, a brand of bourbon. In 1992, the trains on one side were changed to face and run backwards, which was a similar change made to Kings Island's The Racer a decade earlier in 1982. Locals would call this reversed version of the ride the "Yell Rebel". Both were restored to their original configurations in 2008, not long after Cedar Fair purchased the chain of parks from Paramount. For the park's 40th anniversary in 2014, the trains were repainted red and blue to represent their original color scheme, and chasing lights were added back to the water park side of the track.

The Rebel Yell name was dropped in 2018 when the coaster was renamed Racer 75. The new name was labeled an amalgam that mixes references to the coaster's racing configuration, the year it opened, and the ACE acronym for American Coaster Enthusiasts – a club organization that traces its founding back to a 1977 riding event at the park involving Rebel Yell. While the park didn't acknowledge the reason, some speculate the name change coincided with discussions within the state legislature surrounding the removal of Confederate statuary icons throughout Virginia; "Rebel Yell" was also the name of a Confederate battle cry.

== Design ==
Racer 75 features a racing roller coaster layout with two individual tracks that are mirror images of one another. Its design was inspired by the Racer at sister park Kings Island, which opened three years earlier in 1972. The primary difference between the two is that the tracks on the original Racer split at the fourth hill on the outbound journey, whereas the tracks on Racer 75 do not split until the trains begin the turnaround. Racer 75's design was also utilized in the construction of defunct Thunder Road at Carowinds in 1976, which featured the greatest height and speed of the three until its permanent closure in 2015. The tracks ran parallel to Lake Charles, a large man-made lake on the northwest corner of Kings Dominion. Two-thirds of the lake was drained in the early 1990s during construction of Anaconda.

There is one red and one blue train on each side, for a total of two trains on each side. When only running one train on each side, an effort is made to run a train of each color. Racer 75 received the Coaster Landmark award from ACE on June 20, 2003.

== See also ==
- The Racer, a roller coaster at Kings Island with a similar layout
- Thunder Road, a defunct roller coaster at Carowinds with a similar layout
- Removal of Confederate monuments and memorials
