= Herbert Schmeck =

American roller coaster designer

Herbert Paul Schmeck (born 1890 in Reading, Pennsylvania, died 1956) was an American roller coaster designer. From 1923 to 1955, Schmeck designed 84 coasters for the Philadelphia Toboggan Company. As a designer and president, the company became the most prominent manufacturer of roller coasters in the United States.

Schmeck originally worked as a carpenter for the Reading Furniture Works, before he was hired to work on a construction crew for the Philadelphia Toboggan Company. He was offered more jobs when his work ethic impressed company owners. He served as a foreman at Paragon Park on Nantasket Beach in 1916. There he worked with designer John A. Miller on the construction of "The Giant Coaster." He continued to work with the Philadelphia Tobaggan Company assisting with the construction of coasters. Despite no formal training as an engineer, Schmeck learned to design rides by studying blueprints and with his construction knowledge. In 1923 Schmeck designed his first coaster, the Wild Cat at Hersheypark. He later mentored John C. Allen.

Two of his designs, Phoenix at Knoebels' Amusement Resort, and Comet at The Great Escape have frequently been honored as two of the top ten roller coasters.

== Notable designs ==
- Wildcat – Lake Compounce
- Comet – The Great Escape
- Phoenix – Knoebels
- Thunderhawk – Dorney Park & Wildwater Kingdom
- The Wild One – Six Flags America
- Rollo Coaster – Idlewild and Soak Zone
- Comet – Hersheypark
- Little Dipper - Kiddieland (1950-September 2009) Six Flags Great America (April 2010–Present)
- Wild Cat - Idora Park
- Wild Cat - Rocky Springs, Lancaster, PA

== Construction Supervisor ==
- Mountain Dips Coaster (1920-1939) - Rocky Glen Park in Moosic, Pennsylvania
