= Paragon Park Carousel =

Carousel in Hull, Massachusetts

- U.S. National Register of Historic Places
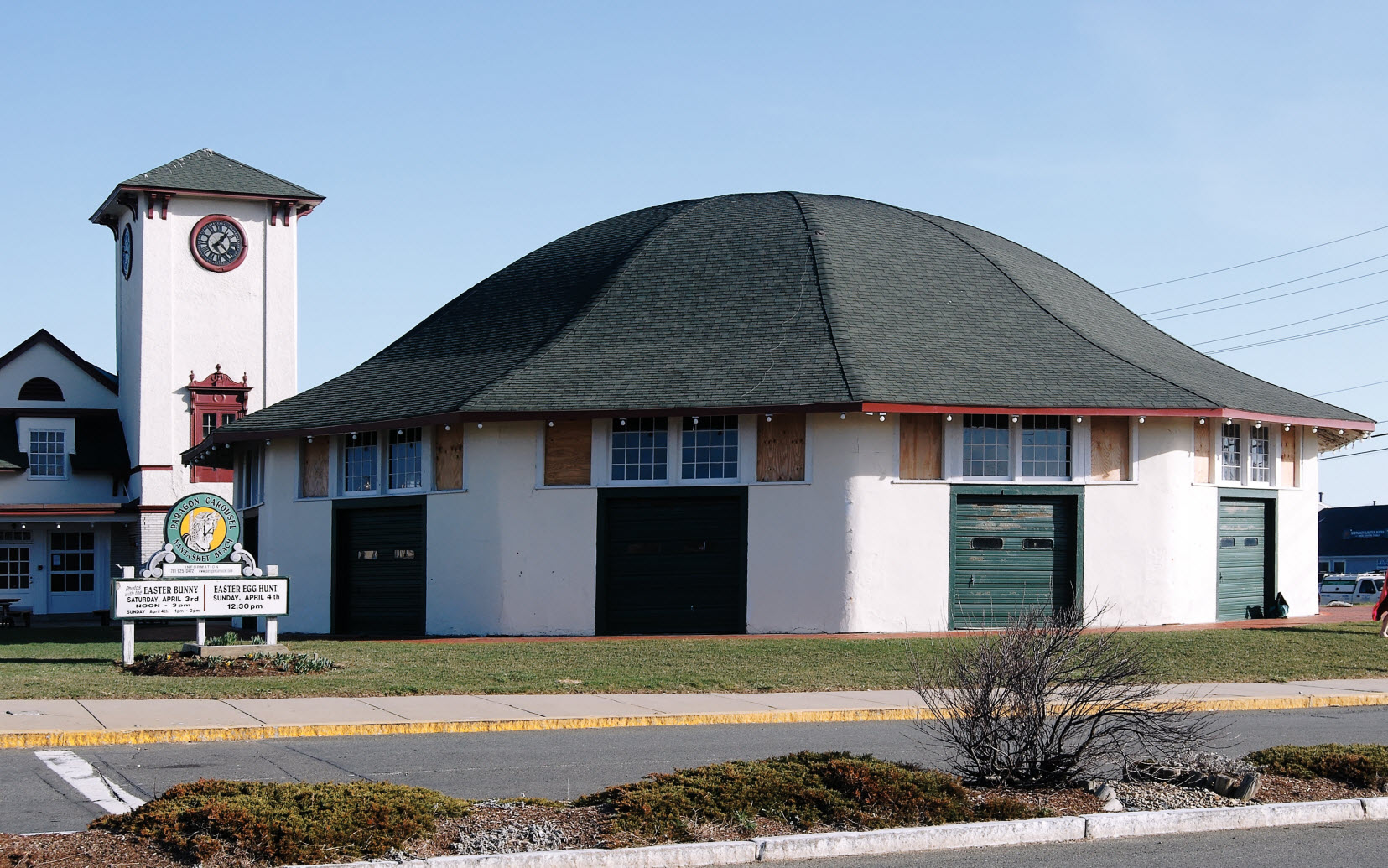

- Location within Massachusetts Location within the United States
- Location: 1 Wharf Avenue, Hull, Massachusetts
- Coordinates: 42°16′12″N 70°51′26″W
- Area: less than one acre
- Built: July 25, 1928 (98 years ago)
- Architect: Carrera, Frank; Weiss, Gustav, et al.
- NRHP reference No.: 99001081
- Added to NRHP: September 14, 1999

The Paragon Park Carousel (PTC #85) is a historic carousel at 1 Wharf Avenue in Hull, Massachusetts. Built in 1928 by the Philadelphia Toboggan Company, it is one of the state's only surviving four-wide carousels, and is the only surviving element of the Paragon Park amusement park. The carousel was listed on the National Register of Historic Places in 1999.

== Description and history ==
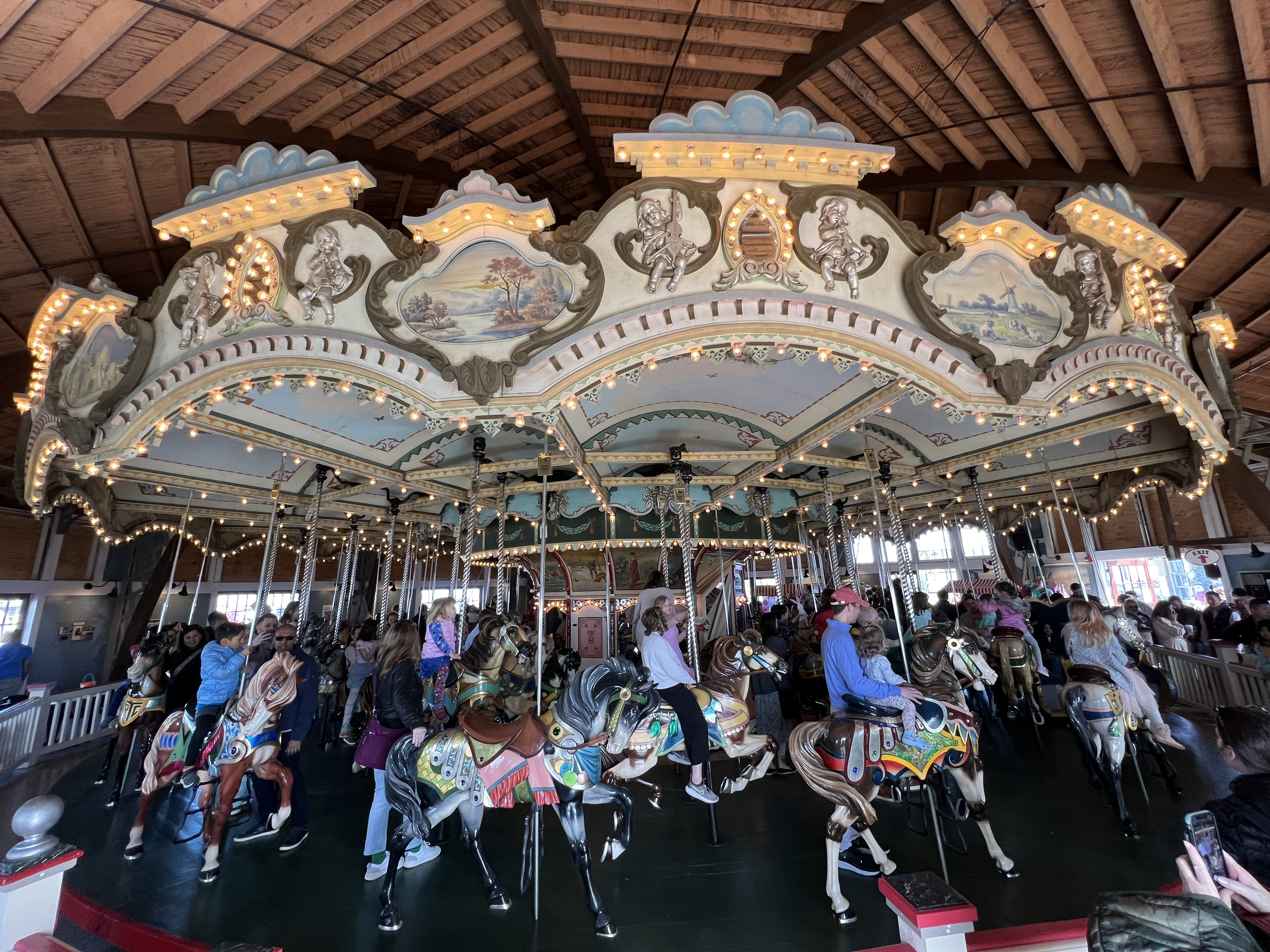
The carousel in 2024

The Paragon Park Carousel is located in southern Hull, on a parcel bounded by Nantasket Avenue, George Washington Boulevard, and Wharf Avenue. Across Nantasket Avenue is Nantasket Beach, a recreation area that has been a well-known summer getaway destination since the 19th century. The carousel is in a stucco-walled single-story twelve-sided building, with a broad bellcast roof. The roof has deep eaves, with exposed rafters. Each face of the building has a garage-style lifting door, above which is a band of four windows. The shape of the building's roof was custom-designed to house the carousel, which has an unusual scalloped top with barrel vaults. The interior of these vaults is painted with a cloud-dotted sky, with the rim decorated with cherubs, cartouches, and international scenery. The carousel consists of a series of wooden sweeps, braced by brackets. All of the horses mounted on the outside rank are stationary, while there are a combination of fixed and moving horses on the inner ranks. There are two Roman-style chariots, each "pulled" by two horses. There are a total of 66 horses, of which 42 move.

The first carousel at Paragon Park was built in 1920 by the Philadelphia Toboggan Company (PTC). The present carousel was also built by the PTC, in 1928. It is believed to contain elements manufactured by the Dentzel Carousel Company, whose assets were purchased by PTC in 1928. It is one of 18 four-wide carousels manufactured by the company, and one of only two four-wide pre-1950 carousels in the state. A Wurlitzer #146-B Band Organ with a Wurlitzer #153 facade provides the carousel's music and it is owned by Bill Luca. Of the Paragon Park rides, it is the only still on what were the park grounds; the Giant Coaster still survives as The Wild One at Six Flags America in Maryland.

The carousel was operated as part of Paragon Park until the park closed in 1984. Its parts were auctioned off, but most were purchased by a locally organized preservation committee. In 1986 it was moved a short distance to its present location. It is now operated by the Friends of the Paragon Carousel.

== See also ==
- Amusement rides on the National Register of Historic Places
- National Register of Historic Places listings in Plymouth County, Massachusetts
