= Barrels O' Fun =

Roller coaster at Six Flags Great Adventure

- Previously known as Ragin' Cajun (2004–2025)

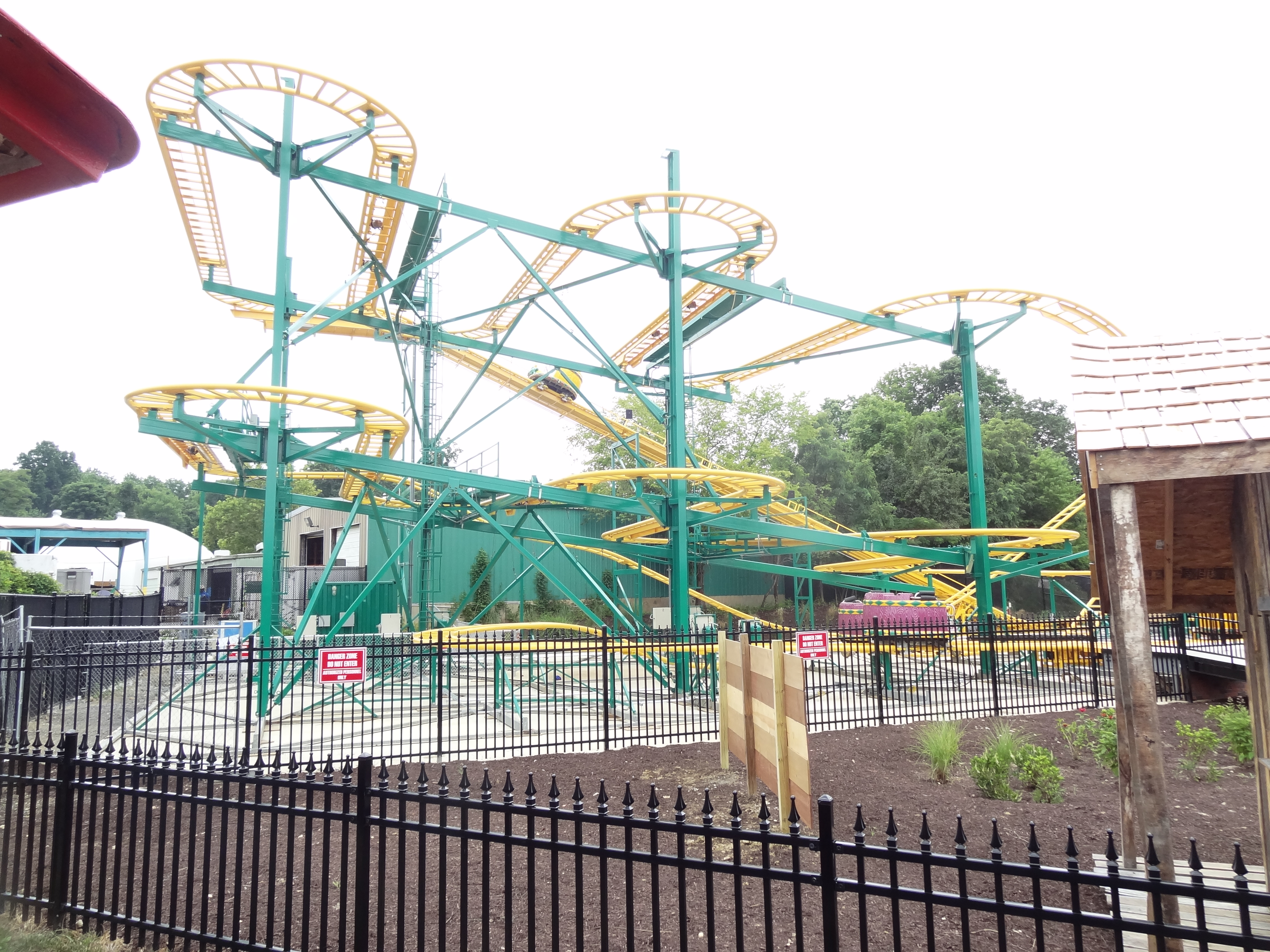
- Barrels O' Fun in 2014, when it was Ragin' Cajun at Six Flags America.

Six Flags Great Adventure
- Park section: Shoreline Pier at the Boardwalk
- Status: Operating
- Opening date: July 8, 2026
- Replaced: Green Lantern

Six Flags America
- Park section: Mardi Gras
- Coordinates: 38.9088°N 76.7715°W
- Status: Removed
- Opening date: June 21, 2014
- Closing date: November 2, 2025
- Replaced: Two Face: The Flip Side

Six Flags Great America
- Park section: Mardi Gras
- Coordinates: 42.368889°N 87.932559°W
- Status: Removed
- Opening date: May 28, 2004
- Closing date: October 27, 2013
- Replaced by: The Joker

General statistics
- Type: Steel – Wild Mouse – Spinning
- Manufacturer: Zamperla
- Model: Twister Coaster 420STD
- Track layout: Wild Mouse
- Lift/launch system: Chain lift hill
- Height: 42.7 ft (13.0 m)
- Length: 1,377.9 ft (420.0 m)
- Speed: 29.1 mph (46.8 km/h)
- Inversions: 0
- Duration: 1:30
- Capacity: 900 riders per hour
- G-force: 2.5
- Height restriction: 48 in (122 cm)
- Trains: 9 trains with a single car; riders arranged 4 across in a single row for a total of 4 riders per train
- Website: Official website
- Barrels O' Fun at RCDB

Barrels O' Fun (formerly known as Ragin' Cajun) is a steel roller coaster located at Six Flags Great Adventure in Jackson Township, New Jersey. Manufactured by Zamperla and Reverchon Industries, the design is a "Crazy Mouse", which is similar to a "Wild Mouse." It is located in Shoreline Pier at the Boardwalk, a newly renovated area at Six Flags Great Adventure. The ride runs five cars at a time, and each car holds up to four riders with a maximum of two adults.

It previously operated as Ragin' Cajun at Six Flags Great America from 2004 to 2013 and Six Flags America from 2014 to 2025.

== History ==
=== Six Flags Great America ===
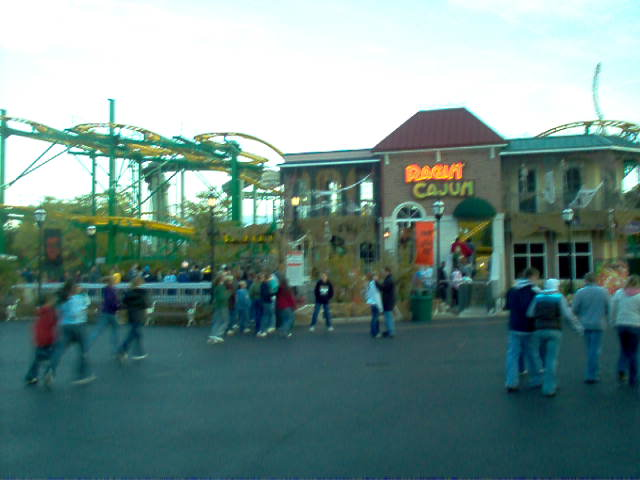
Ragin' Cajun at its first location.

On January 17, 2004, Six Flags Great America announced five new attractions and a whole new themed section called Mardi Gras, which included Ragin' Cajun. The newly themed section Mardi Gras transformed parts of the Orleans Place section. The newly family themed area opened on May 3, 2004, while Ragin' Cajun debuted later that month on May 28, 2004.

The day following its public opening, on May 29, 2004, a 52-year-old ride mechanic named Jack Brouse from Zion, Illinois was hit by a Ragin' Cajun's car full of passengers as he was working along the tracks of the roller coaster. Suffering from a traumatic head injury, he died at Froedtert Hospital in Milwaukee.

=== Six Flags America ===
On August 29, 2013, Six Flags America announced that they would be adding a new Mardi Gras themed area for the 2014 season for their park. The area would include a roller coaster named Ragin' Cajun and a Flying Scooters attraction called French Quarter Flyers. The precinct replaced the former Southwest Territory themed area, necessitating the retheme of the area's existing rides (including Wild One) in order to fit within Mardi Gras.

Without announcement from either Six Flags or Six Flags Great America, the Illinois Ragin' Cajun left the park after the 2013 season and was rebuilt at Six Flags America on the former location of Two Face: The Flip Side, which was removed in 2007. Mardi Gras opened with Six Flags America on opening day of the 2014 season. The area's attractions all opened on April 5, 2014 except for Ragin' Cajun, which officially became available on June 21, 2014.

On May 1, 2025, Six Flags announced that the park would close at the end of the 2025 season on November 2, 2025. The status on the future of the Ragin' Cajun roller coaster was not given at the time of the announcement. Ragin' Cajun was promptly dismantled in February 2026, marking the duration of its time at Six Flags America.

=== Six Flags Great Adventure ===
A renovation of the Boardwalk at Six Flags Great Adventure was first formally announced on March 10, 2026. The area had been left sparse by the removal of several attractions following the 2024 season – namely Twister, Green Lantern, and Parachute Training Center – in addition to construction having begun on a significant Mack Rides roller coaster to open for 2027. Six Flags moved to send various former rides from Six Flags America up to New Jersey as apart of its redevelopment, including Ragin' Cajun. A piece of track was repainted blue and formally publicized on March 20, 2026 to open later in the year.

On March 26, 2026, Six Flags Great Adventure announced that Ragin' Cajun would be moved to the park under the name Barrels O' Fun. It would be located in the renovated Boardwalk area, now named Shoreline Pier at the Boardwalk. The ride opened on July 8th, 2026.
