= ABC Scenic and Wildlife Attractions =

Theme park and travel division of the American Broadcasting Company

- Fate: Defunct
- Services: Theme parks
- Parent: American Broadcasting Company (The Walt Disney Company)

ABC Scenic and Wildlife Attractions, Inc., also known as ABC Attractions, was a business segment of the American Broadcasting Company which focused on amusement parks. The division owned and operated Silver Springs, Weeki Wachee Springs, and Wild Waters in Florida, Smithville in New Jersey, The Wildlife Preserve in Maryland, and Seven Seas Marine Life Park in Texas.

== History ==
Prior to the division’s establishment, ABC-Paramount had historically owned a stake in Walt Disney’s Disneyland park from its construction in 1954 until 1962.

On May 1, 1962, it was reported ABC-Paramount was in talks to acquire the Silver Springs destination in Florida. On May 29, representatives confirmed the reports of the sale, and it was completed on October 31, 1962.

In 1973, ABC took over Ross Perot's plans for building a safari park in Prince George's County, Maryland. After buying the land Perot intended for his Wild World of Animals park, ABC went on to acquire an additional 125 acres (51 ha) adjoining the planned park.

Despite the looming oil crisis, on November 27, 1973, ABC announced they would be investing $2-million into expanding and remodeling the Silver Springs facility in Florida. They also revealed they intended to invest a total of $5-million into the property between 1973 and 1976.

With expansion the goal, on February 12, 1974, it was announced that ABC had obtained a one-year option to buy the historic New Jersey town of Smithville for $9-million. Similar to Colonial Williamsburg, the restored town contained three inns, and about 60 shops and buildings on 2,300 acres (930 ha), located 10 miles (16 km) from Atlantic City.

After a year of construction, The Wildlife Preserve was nearing completion in Largo, Maryland, and its opening date began being advertised as July 1. The 280-acre park was to contain a 45-minute drive through animal safari portion, a Circle-Vision-style film entitled Trace of Life which would present this history of life on earth and nature's battle of survival, in addition to a petting zoo. As the opening date grew closer, the team at The Wildlife Preserve were struggling with fighting between the lions. To correct this, the park's 20 lions were sent to animal behaviorist Jim Fowler, in Clermont, Florida, so he could evaluate which lions were compatible, prior to them arriving at the park. Ron Bugosh, the wildlife manager at the park and the one with the responsibility of breaking up lion fights, was aiming for three-prides, with about nine lions in each one. The lions were all kept in the same area, and the ones that immediately fought were separated. It was through trial and error the lions were broken up into three prides. "Lions have personality clashes just like people," Fowler said. "Some are aggressive, some are docile. By mixing and marching, we eventually end up with groups that are compatible." The planned opening was delayed to July 15, due to "delays in building power equipment and by bad weather," according to John E. Campbell, president of ABC Scenic and Wildlife.

Throughout 1974, ABC experienced disappointing prime-time ratings and although they denied it was the cause, the company experienced an executive shake-up in October. Walter S. Schwartz was appointed president of the newly created ABC Leisure Group II, which oversaw the divisions: ABC Theaters, ABC Scenic and Wildlife Attractions, and the Silver Springs Bottled Water Company.

In April 1974, ABC announced Smithville would open its 2,400 seat outdoor music theater for a nine-week season.

From 1974 to 1978, ABC expanded development at Silver Springs and the surrounding area. In 1974 they started to renovate a 5-acre (2.0 ha) island. Cypress Island opened as an attraction in November 1974, with a formal opening in the spring. Developments included the Cypress Gift Shop and an open-air beer pavilion. Activities and exhibits on the island included a new facility for the Ross Allen Reptile Institute, with three large wooden amphitheaters for reptile shows, and some animal exhibits. The Jungle Cruise loading dock was moved to the island.

During ABC's 1975 second quarter its net income fell 22%, from $17.5 million to $13.6 million. ABC revealed that's third quarter net would be down because of, "the softness of the television-advertising marketplace and the continuing high cost of restructuring the company." But the company did say the Florida scenic attractions had improved revenue results, unfortunately "...attendance levels were very disappointing at The Wildlife Preserve in Largo, MD, and at Historic Smithville." In September, ABC cited the 1973 year as profitable prior to the start of the 1973 oil crisis in October, and that the crisis was to blame for poor attendance.

In an attempt to course-correct, ABC brought in Len Levin to create new advertising spots for The Wildlife Preserve, in hopes it could change public opinion on the park. In October 1975, ABC said The Wildlife Preserve was, "affected both by the economy and by new competitive attractions in the area." In hopes to compete with Kings Dominion, in November, ABC planned on building a $30 million themed amusement park to go along with the existing offerings at The Wildlife Preserve.

Despite the company's goals, ABC's stock price continued to stumble and as a result in February 1976, it was announced the expansion was canceled, and The Wildlife Preserve would close. ABC wrote-down its investment in the 405-acre (164 ha) Wildlife Preserve by roughly $10.4 million before taxes to the estimated value of the land and facilities. A spokesperson for the company confirmed they no longer intended to operate a park at the site, and "[would] probably" attempt to sell the land.

ABC developed a sister water park at the Silver Springs site, Wild Waters, giving 450 press representatives a tour of all the Silver Springs facilities on April 28, 1978, before opening the next day to the public.

In November 1978, it was revealed Jim Fowler, and his group of naturalists and Washington businessmen, was offered an option to buy The Wildlife Preserve from ABC for $3 million. Russel W. Shipley, the attorney representing Fowler's group revealed the sale was expected to be completed that year, and the park would likely reopen Spring 1979.

On January 9, 1979, it was announced that ABC had reached an agreement to sell to Historic Smithville town for less than $20 million to attorney James L. Cooper.

In 1984, ABC sold the land occupied by Silver Springs and Wild Waters to Florida Leisure Attractions.

== See also ==
- Disney Experiences
- Warner Bros. Discovery Global Experiences
- Universal Destinations & Experiences
