= Penguin's Blizzard River =

Spinning rapids ride

Six Flags America
- Area: Gotham City
- Status: Removed
- Opening date: April 11, 2003
- Closing date: October 19, 2025

General statistics
- Type: Spinning Rapids Ride
- Manufacturer: WhiteWater West
- Lift system: 3 Chain Lifts
- Length: 940 ft (290 m)
- Speed: 15 mph (24 km/h)
- Duration: 2:41 minutes
- Height restriction: 36 in (91 cm)
- Flash Pass was Available
- Single rider line was available

Penguin's Blizzard River, was a spinning rapids ride at Six Flags America themed to the Penguin. Debuting in April 2003, the attraction was the tallest spinning rapids ride in the world.

In the 1990s, ride manufacturer WhiteWater West Industries, based out of Richmond, British Columbia, developed the Spinning Rapids Ride with an estimated sale price of $2.5-million.

When the attraction opened, it was the only one of its kind on the East Coast.

On May 1, 2025, Six Flags announced that the Six Flags America park will close at the end of the 2025 season on November 2, 2025. The status on the future of the Penguin's Blizzard River spinning rapids ride was not given at the time of the announcement.

== See also ==
- WhiteWater West Industries
