= Ride of Steel =

Steel roller coaster

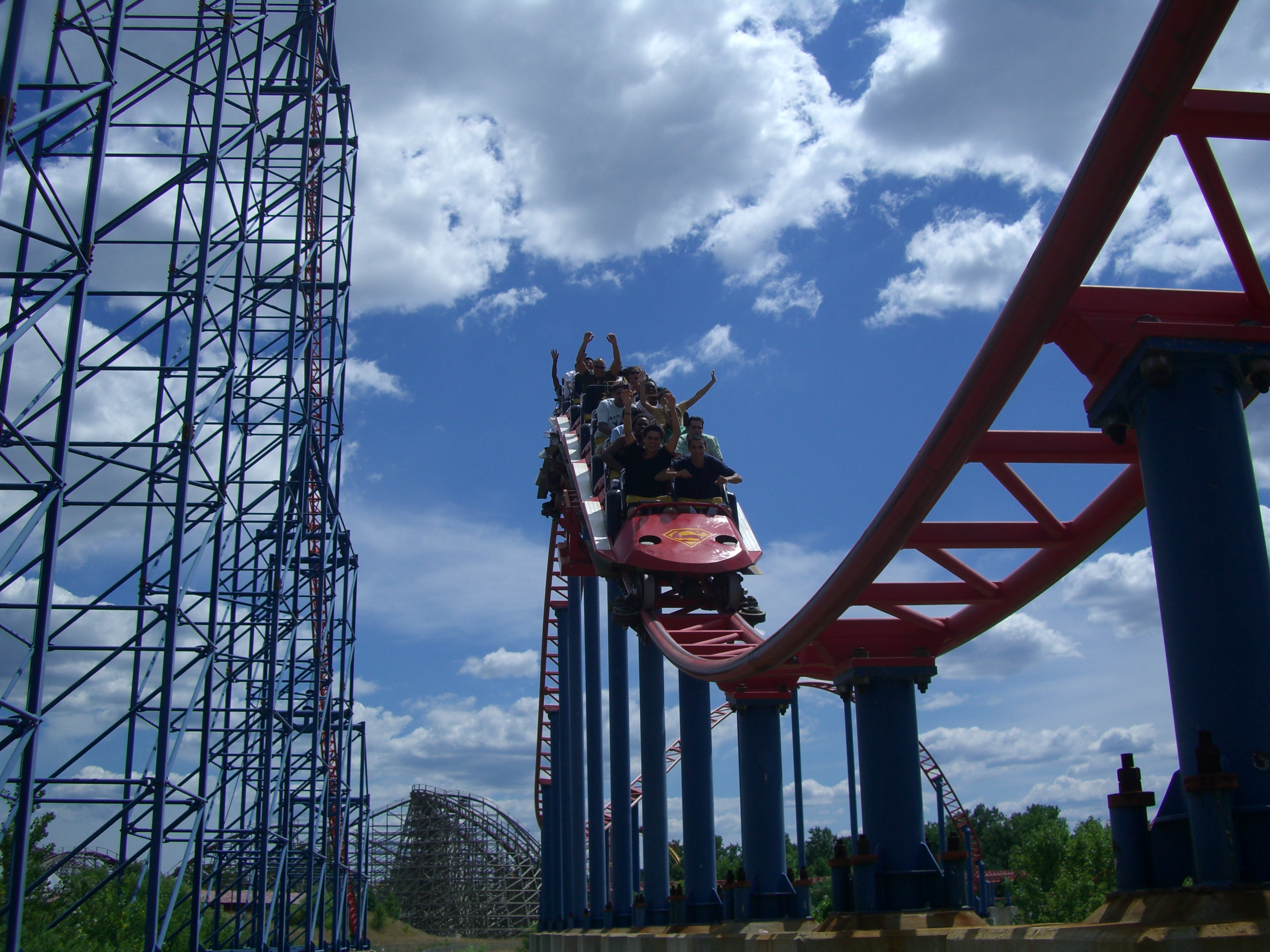
- Superman – Ride of Steel at Six Flags America

Six Flags America
- Name: Superman – Ride of Steel
- Park section: Gotham City
- Coordinates: 38°54′30.5″N 76°46′37.7″W
- Status: Closed
- Opening date: May 13, 2000
- Closing date: November 2, 2025

Six Flags Darien Lake
- Coordinates: 42°55′43.8″N 78°23′21.7″W
- Status: Operating
- Opening date: May 15, 1999
- Ride of Steel at Six Flags Darien Lake at RCDB

General statistics
- Type: Steel
- Manufacturer: Intamin
- Designer: Werner Stengel
- Model: Mega Coaster
- Lift/launch system: Chain lift hill
- Height: 208 ft (63 m)
- Drop: 205 ft (62 m)
- Length: 5,400 ft (1,600 m)
- Speed: 73 mph (117 km/h)
- Inversions: 0
- Duration: 2:02
- Max vertical angle: 68°
- Capacity: 1100 riders per hour
- Height restriction: 54–76 in (137–193 cm)
- Trains: 2 trains with 8 cars; riders arranged 2 across in 2 rows for a total of 32 riders per train
- Fast Lane available
- Ride of Steel at RCDB

Ride of Steel is a steel roller coaster based on the DC Comics character Superman at Six Flags Darien Lake and formerly at Six Flags America (the latter of which was known as Superman – Ride of Steel). Both roller coasters are hypercoasters, and were manufactured by Intamin. They feature identical mirrored layouts, and opened one year apart: the Six Flags Darien Lake ride in 1999, and the Six Flags America ride in 2000. The roller coaster at Six Flags Darien Lake, upon the acquisition of the park by PARC Management in 2007, was renamed simply to Ride of Steel, dropping the Superman theme and branding for the sake of copyright. While Six Flags Darien Lake was reintegrated into the Six Flags chain in 2019, the Superman theme was not returned to the ride.

Both roller coasters are 208 feet (63 m) tall, feature a drop length of 205 feet (62 m), and reach a maximum speed of 73 mph (117 km/h).

On May 1, 2025, Six Flags announced that the Six Flags America park would close on November 2, 2025. The future of the Superman – Ride of Steel roller coaster was not commented on at the time of the announcement.

== Ride layout ==
Upon dispatch from the station, the train makes a winding 180-degree turn. It ascends 208 feet (63 m) up the lift hill before dropping 205 feet (62 m) at an angle of 68 degrees. The train reaches the maximum speed of 73 mph (117 km/h) before entering a sharp turn and the first airtime hill. A 540-degree helix follows, in addition to another smaller airtime hill. The finale involves a 500-degree helix and three more airtime hills before reaching the brake run and returning to the station. The layout of the Six Flags America ride was mirrored from the Six Flags Darien Lake ride.

=== Elements ===
- 5 airtime hills (4 straightforward airtime hills and 1 twisted airtime hill)
- 2 helixes (540-degree and 500-degree)

== VR experience ==
On March 3, 2016, Six Flags announced that the ride at Six Flags America would be one of several rides at various Six Flags parks to integrate a VR system into its ride experience. Riders were given the option of wearing a Samsung Gear VR headset, powered by Oculus, to create a 360-degree 3D experience while riding. It featured Superman saving a city from Lex Luthor's Lex Bots, who were causing chaos with an anti-gravity ray. This feature was also added to Superman: Krypton Coaster at Six Flags Fiesta Texas and Superman The Ride at Six Flags New England. It was eventually removed.

== Rankings ==
Golden Ticket Awards: Top steel Roller Coasters
Year									1998	1999
Ranking									–	–
Year	2000	2001	2002	2003	2004	2005	2006	2007	2008	2009
Ranking	–	20	16	13	12	18	23	14	17	28
Year	2010	2011	2012	2013	2014	2015	2016	2017	2018	2019
Ranking	26	40	43	38	–	–	–	–	39 (tie)	47 (tie)
Year	2020	2021	2022	2023	2024	2025	2026			
Ranking	N/A	–	–	–	–	–	–			

Ride station at Six Flags Darien Lake

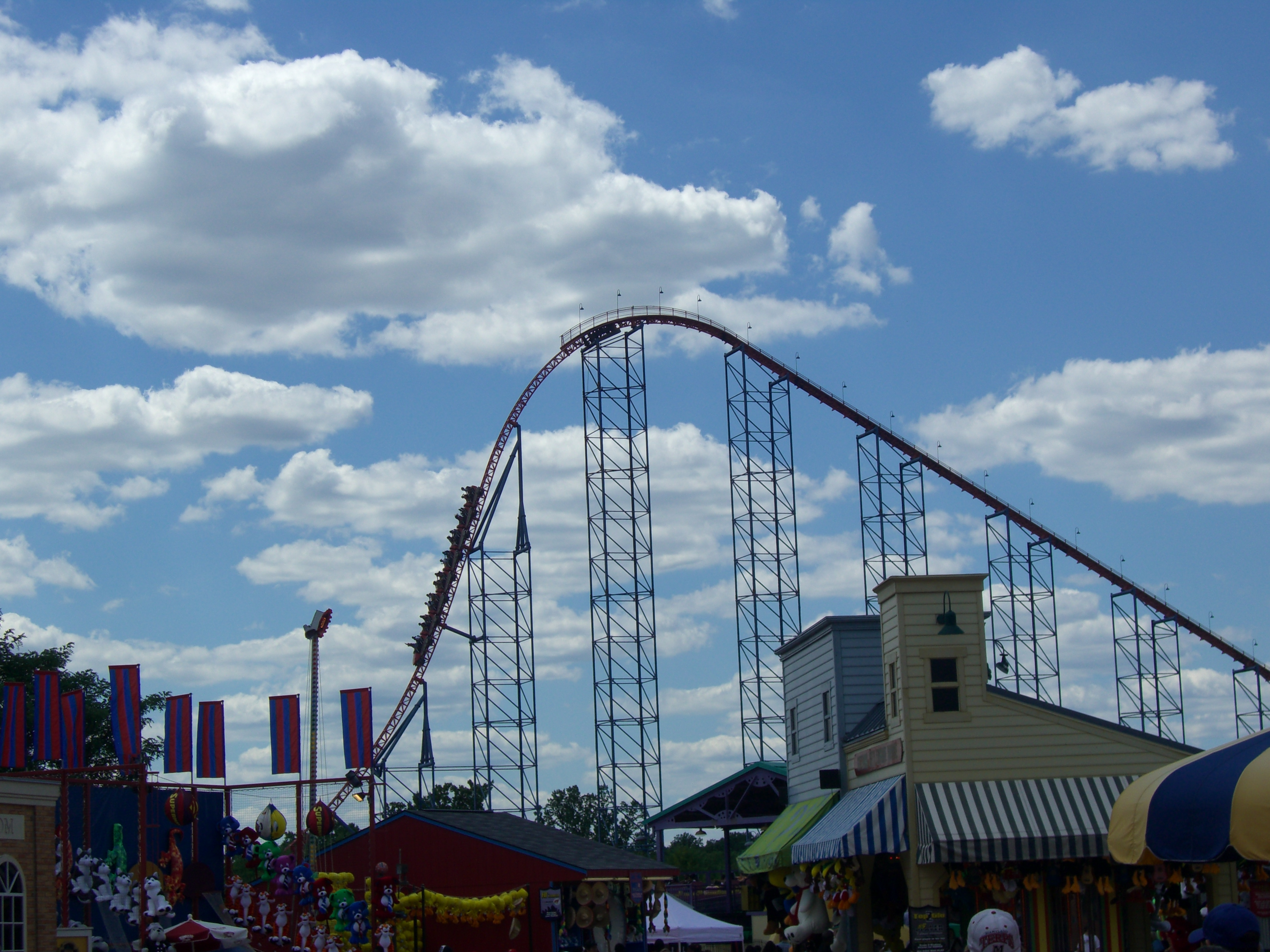
Lift hill and first drop at Six Flags America

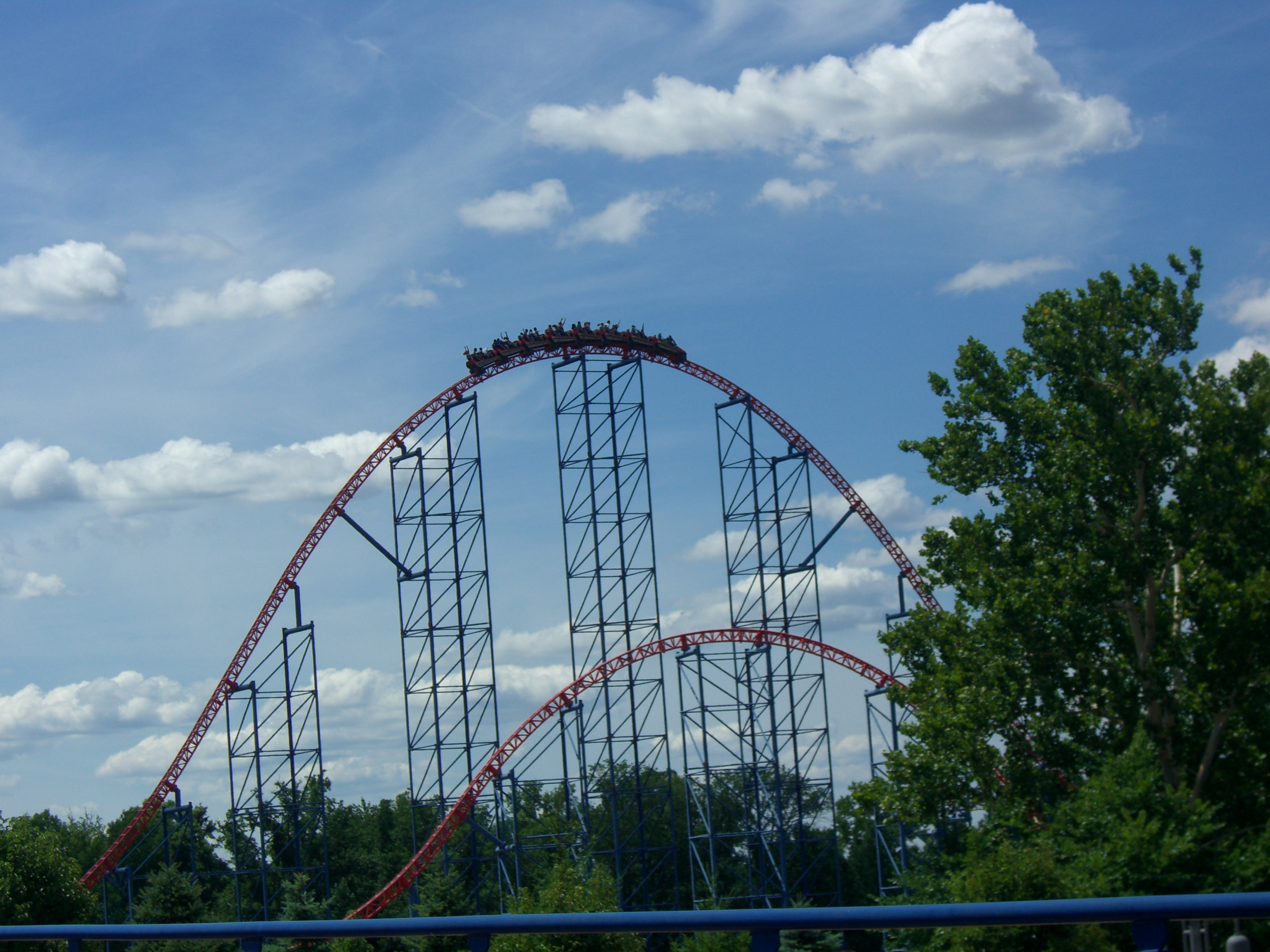
First airtime hill at Six Flags America

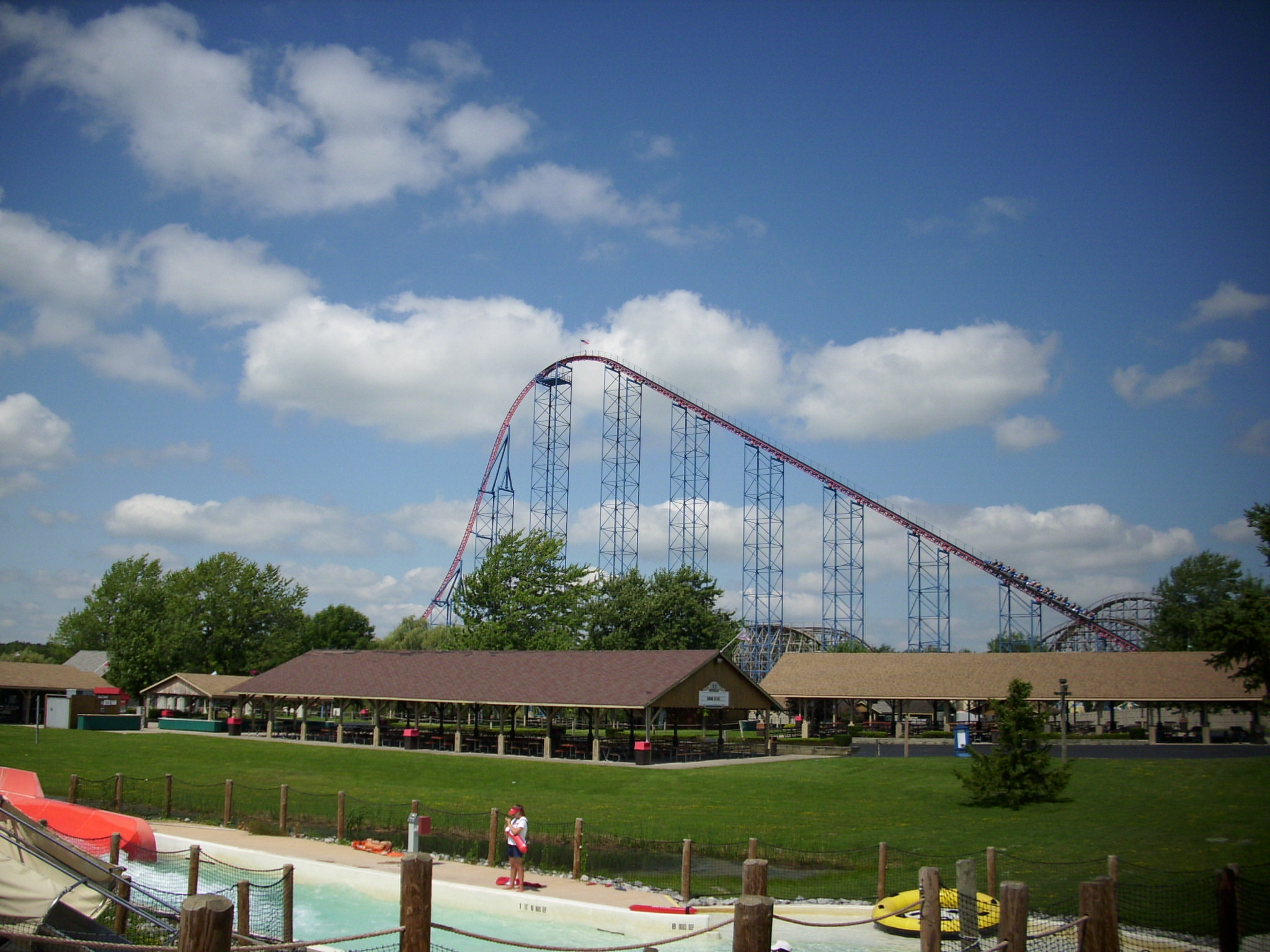
Ride of Steel at Six Flags Darien Lake

== Incidents ==
=== Six Flags Darien Lake ===
- On May 16, 1999, a passenger was thrown from the train at the Six Flags Darien Lake installment on one of the final airtime hills, suffering serious injuries. He was awarded US$3.95 million in damages.
- On July 8, 2011, a disabled Iraq War veteran who lost both legs during his deployment died after being ejected from the front seat of the Six Flags Darien Lake installment. The state's Department of Labor cited "operator error" as the cause of the accident and issued two violations, in which the park responded by retraining staff and updating ride safety signage before reopening the ride. A final report from the local sheriff's office detailed negligence by the employees, who should have been aware that the restraints required passengers to have both legs in order to be restrained safely. Witnesses reported seeing the man let go of the restraint to reach for his hat that had flown off his head before he was ejected, and evidence suggested that he died instantly from blunt force trauma to the head when he came into contact with the front of a ride car. Following this incident, the ride temporarily ceased operation for two weeks before reopening again on July 22.
