= Partnership Mansion =

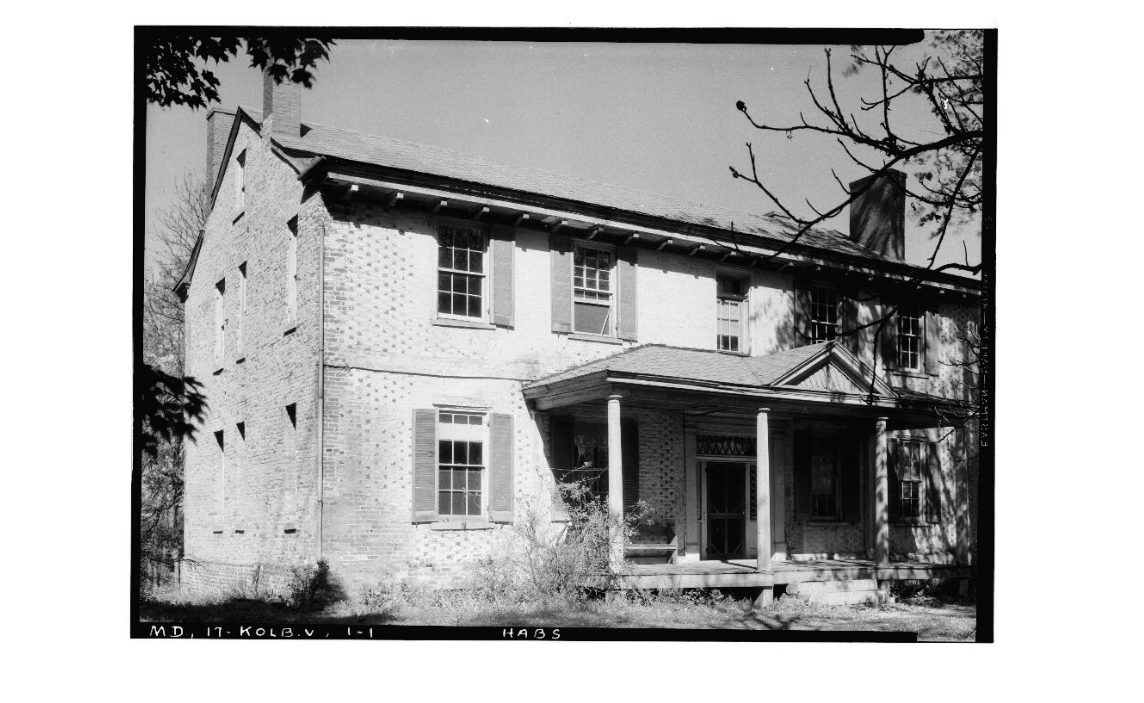
- Partnership on October 12, 1936
- Interactive map of the Partnership Mansion area

General information
- Status: Collapsed
- Architectural style: Federal; Greek Revival
- Location: Maryland
- Coordinates: 38°54′37.0″N 76°46′24.2″W
- Destroyed: 2011
- Owner: Six Flags

The Partnership Mansion, also referred to as Pleasant Hill or Hall Manor, was a mansion located in Upper Marlboro, Maryland and was situated about 15 miles (24 km) east of Washington, D.C. and 30 miles (48 km) southwest of Baltimore. The now-defunct Six Flags America would later be built on the grounds. The original structure was built by the Hall family in the late 1690s and early 1700s, and was added on to by subsequent owners notably the Berry family in the 1840s.

== Description of house ==
Partnership was a large, two-story, brick plantation house built in the early eighteenth century and then later added onto in the 1840s. The house had a Georgian plan, a flared gable roof and walls of Flemish bond; the main and rear facades had glazed header bricks. This building incorporated parts of an early eighteenth-century Hall family home; on the grounds is a single Hall family tombstone dating from the early eighteenth century.

The house had undergone several rebuildings, including a major renovation during the residence of the Berry family in the mid-nineteenth century. It was presumed that remnants of a brick kitchen building known to have existed at the end of the eighteenth century may have exist under the nineteenth century frame kitchen. Partnership exhibited features of both the Federal and Greek Revival styles, and was an important county landmark.

== History ==
The house prior to brick renovation

Richard Hall (1635 - 1688) upon his death willed to his children various land parcels across the Province of Maryland. His son Benjamin was given land in Prince George's County, Maryland. Benjamin Hall (1667 - 1721) married Mary Brooke (~1656 - 1742), around 1695. Benjamin and Mary had at least two children Francis, born around 1696, was the son and heir, and Ellinor, who would die in 1702 at the age of 5-years old. During Francis Hall's childhood, and continuing into him being sent to France for school, the mansion would be rebuilt out of brick. Francis would return from school abroad, marry Dorothy Lowe, and have six children.

On January 16, 1761, Francis Hall acquired another 30 acres to be added to the Partnership land. Then on May 10 of the same year, he added another 67 acres to the overall property.

Francis Hall resided at Partnership until his death in September 1785. His son Benjamin Hall II (1719 - 1803) would acquire the homestead. Benjamin Hall II, married Eleanor Murdock (~1739 - 1796), and had five children. Their youngest son Henry Lowe Hall (1761 - 1817) would inherit Partnership, but die unmarried with no children. Partnership was then left to Benjamin Hall Clarke (1786 - ~1850), the son of Henry's sister Nancy and her husband Thomas Clarke. Benjamin Clarke married Eleanor Clagett but had no children.

The Berry family, which were friends with the Clagetts, acquired the farm in the mid 19th century. While they resided there, the Berry's referred to the home as Ellerslie. By 1905, the home was owned by Mr. J. Newton White and his wife. It was also around that time when the house started being referred to as Pleasant Hill.

On January 12, 1906, a dinner party was held at the home.

Plans were made in the late 1990s to restore the mansion, and to use it as offices for Six Flags America, but it was deemed too costly. While other plans were being developed to save the property, in 2005 an exterior wall collapsed destroying any salvage plans. The rest of the home collapsed in the January 2011 blizzard.

== The Haunting of Hall Manor ==
The Haunting of Hall Manor was a Fright Fest experience at Six Flags America first introduced in the 1990s, it is themed around the derelict mansion, and named after Ellinor Hall, the 5-year-old daughter of the Hall family that is buried on the premises. In the 2000s, the event was renamed Hall Manor: House of Horrors.

Following the COVID-19 pandemic, the attraction re-opened in 2021 as The Haunting of Hall Manor: The Return of Eleanor Hall.
