= Wild Waters =

Former water park in Silver Springs

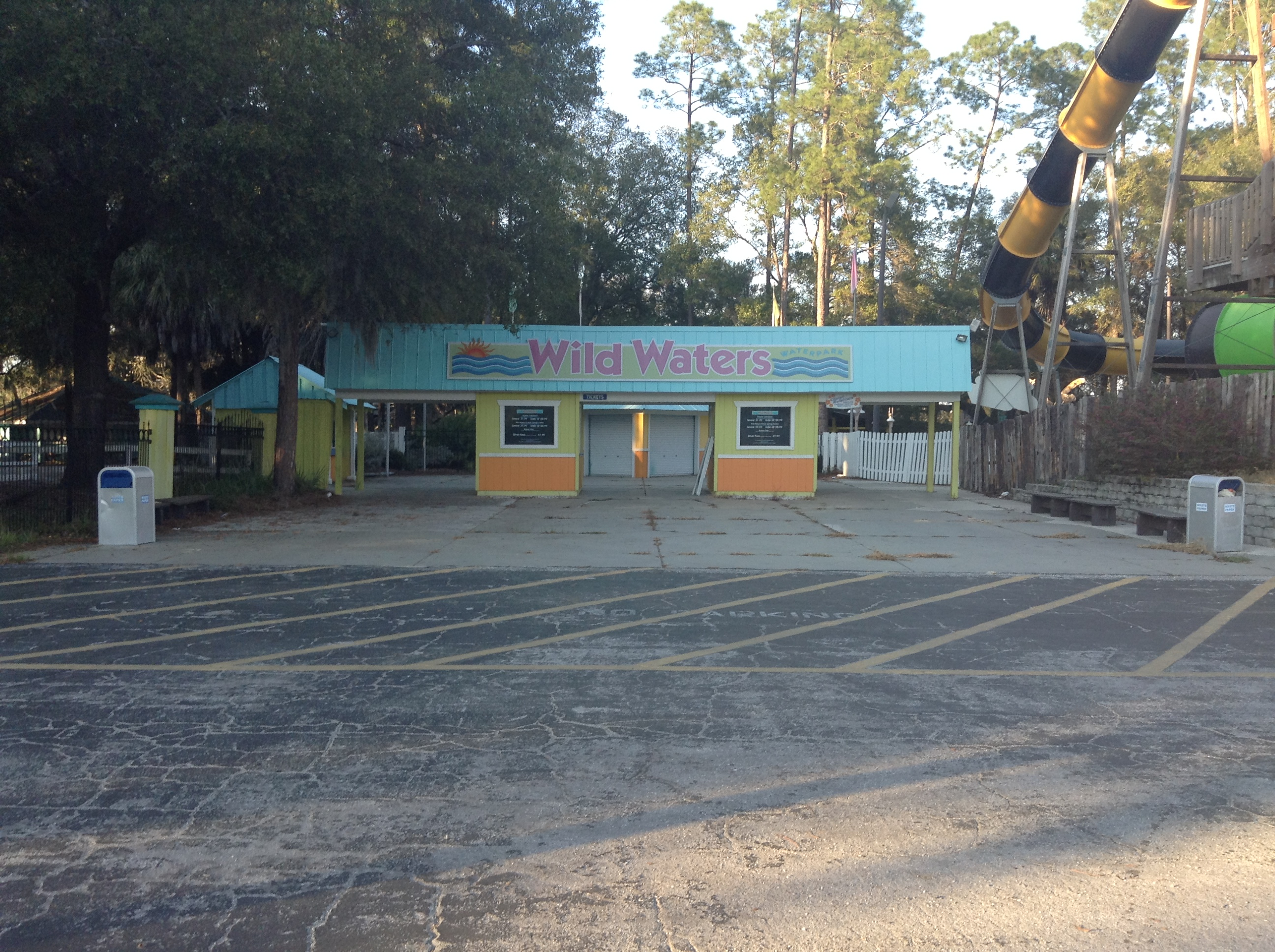
- The old entrance to Wild Waters before it closed.
- Interactive map of Wild Waters
- Location: Silver Springs, Florida, United States
- Coordinates: 29.216342°N 82.056898°W
- Opened: April 28, 1978; 47 years ago
- Closed: September 5, 2016; 9 years ago
- Operating season: Summer
- Status: Defunct[[]]
- Area: 6 acres (2.4 ha)
- Children's areas: A single children's area

Wild Waters was a water park in Silver Springs, Florida. It was the sister park of Silver Springs Nature Theme Park in Silver Springs. Because Wild Waters was adjacent to Silver Springs, it had many trees and shady areas. There were picnic areas, a snack bar, and an open-air fast food restaurant counter. The park also had a sand volleyball court and a gift shop.

Wild Waters was a favorite attraction for tourists visiting the Ocala and Silver Springs area, as well as local residents. It was a small park by modern standards but offered a more relaxed atmosphere than its larger competitors. Wild Waters had a special niche; it attracted people wanting to enjoy a more traditional water park experience. It was among the first water parks in the country to use fiberglass flumes, something that has become the industry standard.

On August 9, 2016, it was announced that Wild Waters would close permanently on September 5, 2016, (the same day Wildwater Kingdom closed). The park had ended nearly four decades of operation, and was to be cleared for a new entry into Silver Springs State Park. Left abandoned for over two years, Wild Waters was the subject of several urban exploration YouTube videos due to its ruined state. Demolition of the water park and all of its attractions began in December 2018. As of April 2019, very little of the park remains.

== Rides & Attractions ==
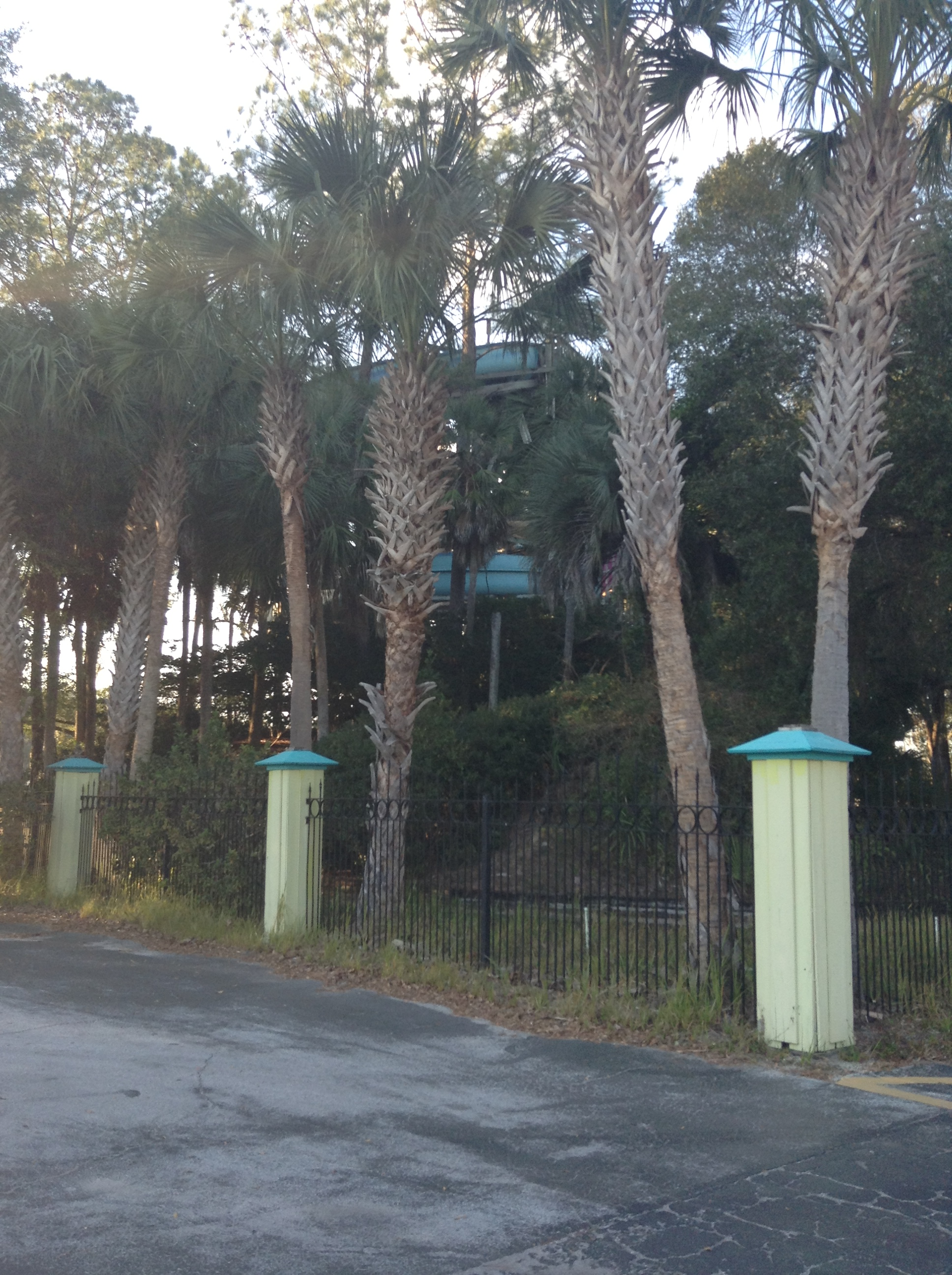
A partial view of "The Hurricane" from outside the park.

The Hurricane: A large figure eight shaped double flume. Standing approximately 80 feet tall, it was the largest ride in the park. A large spiral staircase took visitors to the summit. There were two flumes, which ran parallel to each other. Riders used tubes to ride, which they had to carry to the top. This was due to the ride not originally requiring the use of tubes. The finale of the ride was a long dark tunnel before a turbulent splash pool.

Osceola's Revenge and Bunyan's Bend: Dual flumes that were part of the Silver River Flumes area. Both flumes began at the same point, but did not run parallel and had different patterns. Both featured many drops and turns, and both ended at the same splash pool. Osceola's Revenge had an extra drop, and was therefore rated with a higher thrill level than Bunyan's Bend.

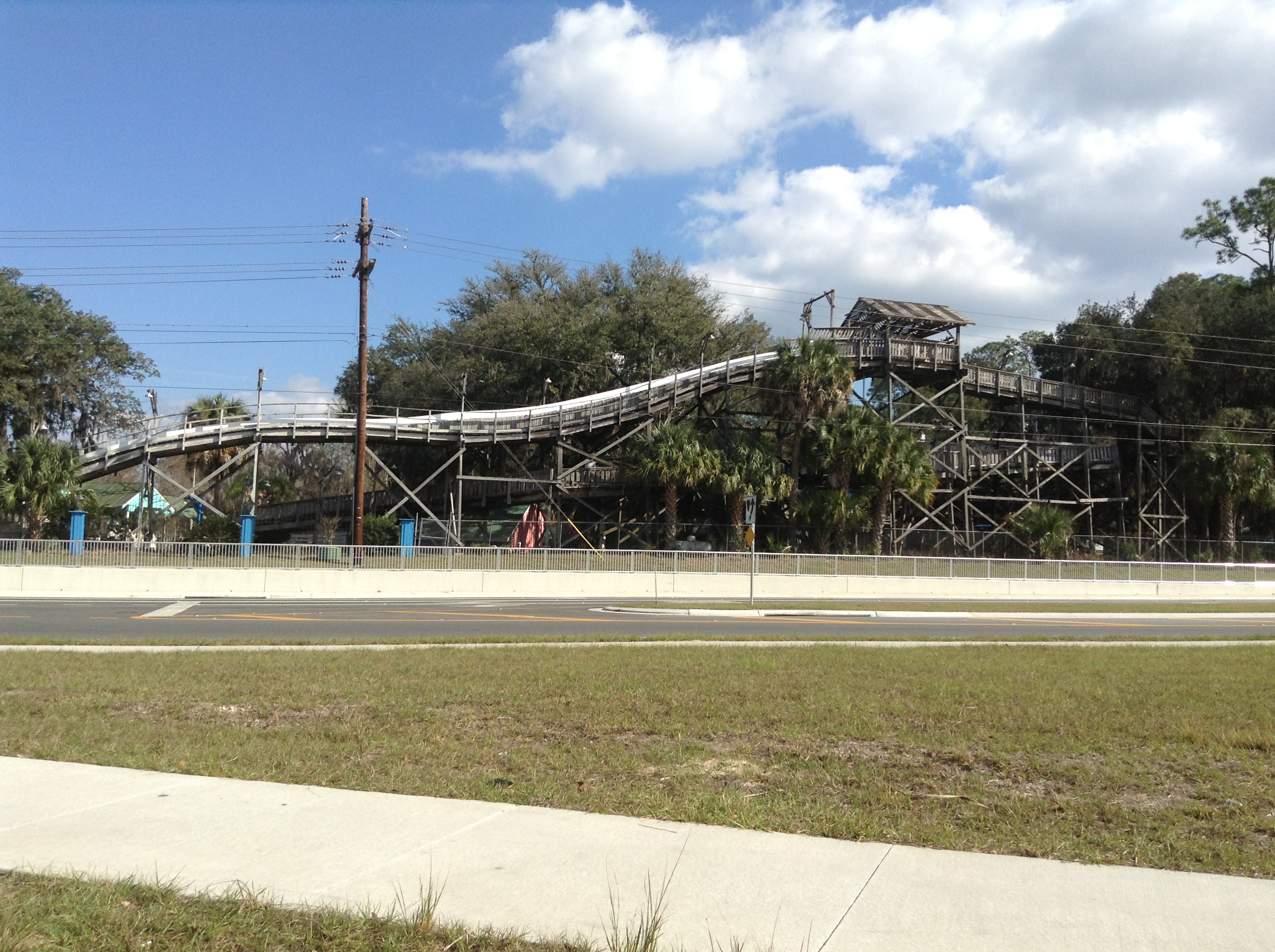
A view of the "Silver Bullet" from State Road 40.

Silver Bullet: Wild Waters only speed flumes, they were part of the Silver River Flumes area. Dual speed flumes ran side by side and ended in a large splash pool. Unlike newer speed flumes, the Silver Bullet did not go straight down from the top. The flumes had two dips, with plateaus between them.

Mini Monster: A single flume that was part of the Silver River Flumes area. The ride was very short with only a few turns and no dips. It then ended into a splash pool.

Wavepool: A 67 gallon pool that alternated between calm water and generating waves after a certain period of time. The waves could reach up to four feet tall at the deepest end of the pool. The deck surrounding the wave pool was filled with lounge chairs.

"Cool Kids Cove": A Kids water ride area that included Henry Flagler's Boat of Bounce, Caterpillar Tunnel of Fun, and Silver Springs Kiddie Canoe and Kayaks, to name a few; $3 per ride.

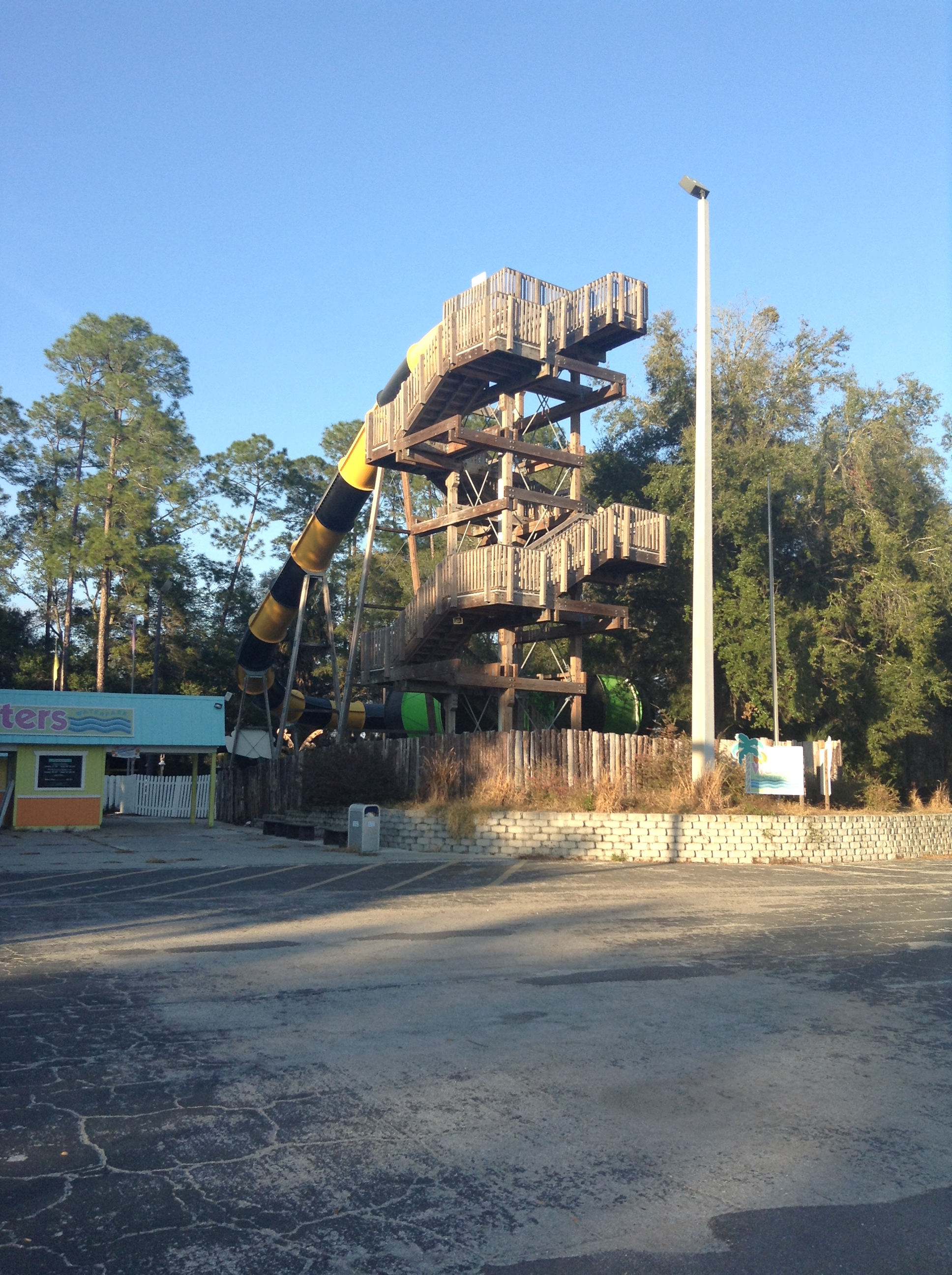
A partial view of the former "Alligator Ambush" ride and its queue from outside the park.

Alligator Ambush: A newer flume, constructed in early 2008. The ride consisted of an enclosed water flume that exited into a slide funnel (commonly referred to as a "toilet bowl"). After exiting the funnel, riders entered another short tube and then ended in an open chute.

== Earlier Defunct Rides ==
In the early 1990s, the park added several new water flumes including the Tornado, the Thunderbolt, and the Twin Twister as part of an ambitious expansion plan. Unlike the other flumes in the park whose frames were constructed of wood and concrete, the new ride's frames were made of steel. In 2006 the Twin Twister, ThunderBolt, and Tornado were all taken out of service and dismantled. This was due to cost-cutting measures, as well as safety concerns. The steel frames of the rides were showing obvious signs of corrosion in the humid Central Florida environment.

The former name of the children's play area was "Bonanza". It had towers equipped with water cannons that could be sprayed down onto people below. The towers were connected to each other via rope bridges. On the ground next to the towers were bunkers also equipped with water cannons that could be fired at the towers. A fully enclosed flume left from the top of one of the towers, and emptied into the pool below. The Bonanza was closed and demolished in the mid-1990s to make way for the new children's area.

== See also ==
- List of water parks
