= Paragon Park =

Amusement park in Hull, Massachusetts (1905–84)

Coordinates: 42°16′6.42″N 70°51′16.97″W

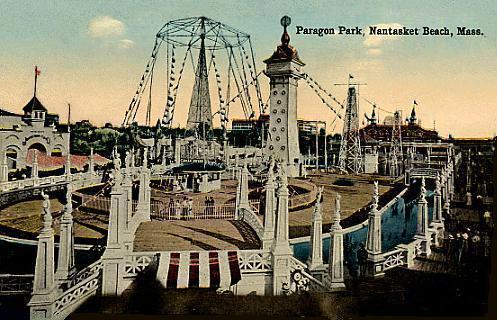
- Paragon Park circa 1914
- Interactive map of Paragon Park
- Location: Nantasket Beach, Massachusetts, United States
- Status: Defunct
- Opened: June 10, 1905
- Closed: September 30, 1984; 41 years ago
- Owner: Larry & Phyllis Stone

Paragon Park was an amusement park located on Nantasket Beach in Hull, Massachusetts. It opened in 1905 and closed in 1984.

== Rides ==
Among the amusement rides in operation during Paragon Park's history was a traditional-style Philadelphia Toboggan Company carousel (PTC #85) built in 1928 with hand-crafted horses, a bumper cars ride known as "Auto Scooters", a Ferris wheel, a horror-themed dark ride called "Kooky Kastle", and a wooden roller coaster known as The Giant Coaster.

There was also a ski lift-type ride called the Sky Lark, an automobile-themed ride known as "Turnpike Cars" (replaced by a different ride in the 1970s called the "Indy 500"), and a water ride called "Bermuda Triangle" (formerly the "Congo Cruise," the "Jungle Ride," the "Red Mill", and the "Mill Rapids"). More rides that Paragon hosted over the years were the Trabant, the Tilt-A-Whirl, Galaxy Coaster, the Skydiver, Paratrooper, Matterhorn, Himalaya, Round Up, Scrambler, Crazy Tea Cups, Twister Kiddie Coaster, Caterpillar, the Whip, Batman-slide, Super-slide, Salt and Pepper Shakers, Swing ride, Rotor, along with many rides that were smaller versions of these, geared towards children.

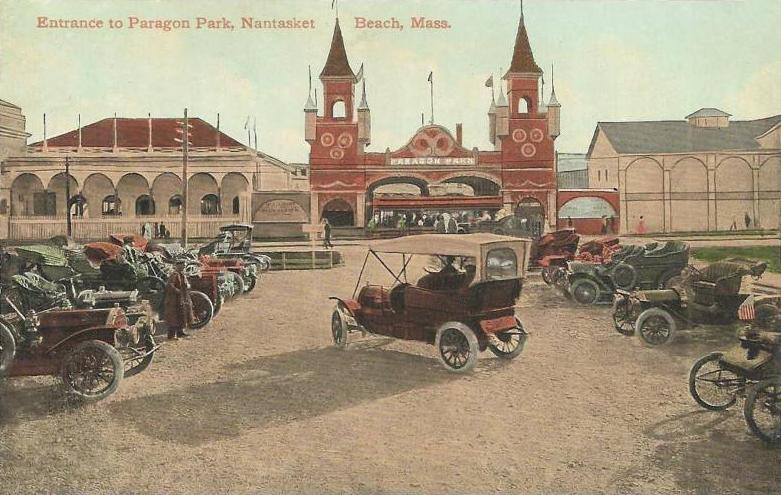
Park entrance in 1908

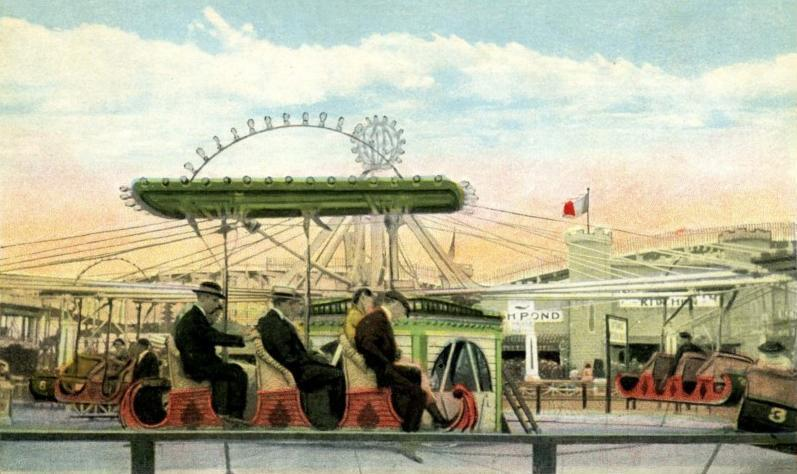
Airship Swing c. 1920

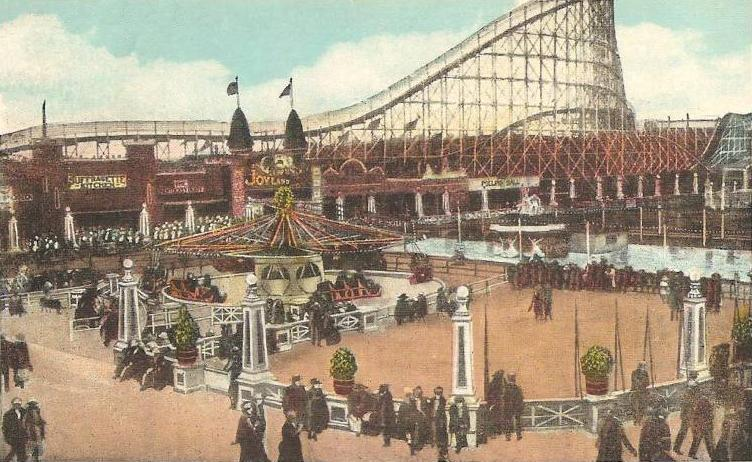
General view c. 1920

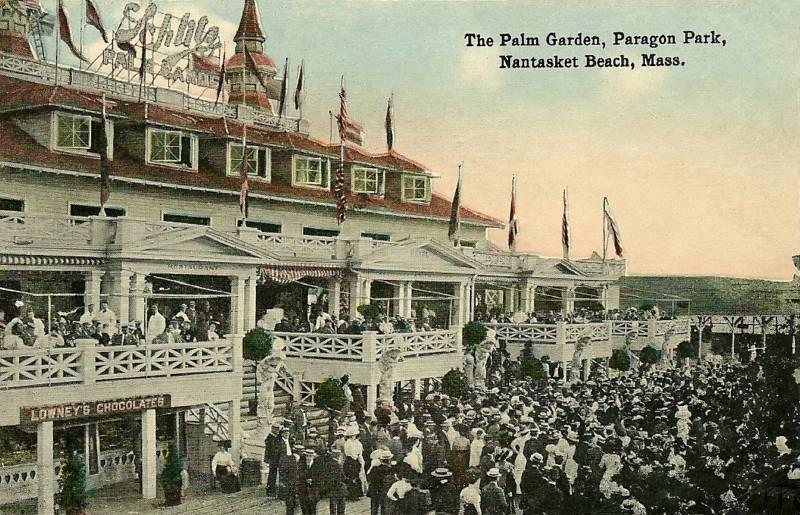
The Palm Garden in 1913

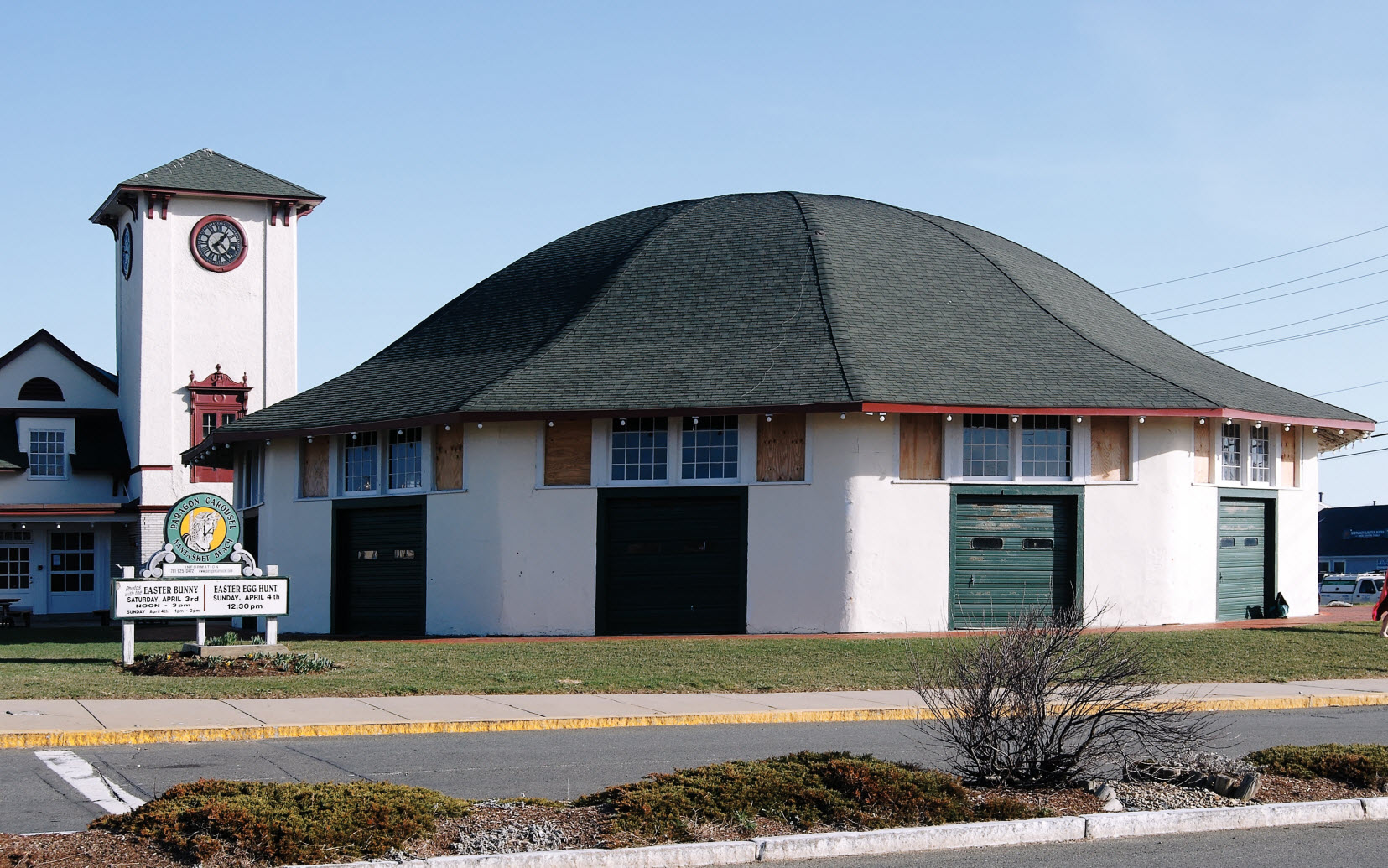
Paragon Carousel House Today

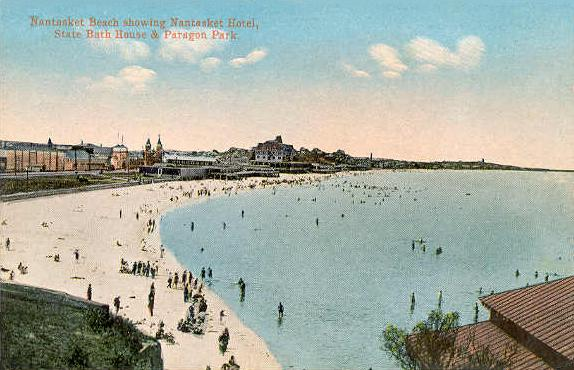
Nantasket Beach at Paragon Park

== Other entertainment ==
Skeeball and pinball machines were favorite games at Paragon Park's penny arcade. Vendors along the boardwalk sold fried clams, salt water taffy made in a pulling machine visible to patrons, hot dogs and other food. There was a miniature golf course under the roller coaster. And in the mid-1960s, local radio station WBZ sometimes had live broadcasts from Paragon Park. The deejays used a trailer, called the Sundeck Studio, which was outfitted with broadcasting equipment.

== Today ==
Today, the only surviving remnant of Paragon Park on the boardwalk is the historic Paragon Park Carousel, which was moved from its original site. It now is located next to the old train station and clock tower. The rest of the site is devoted to condominium development. The Giant Coaster, built in 1917 and removed from the park in 1985, reopened in 1986 as The Wild One at Six Flags America, where it operated until the park's closure in 2025, with the status of the ride's future unknown.

A miniature golf course is located on one of the smaller sites that once housed a water slide and a few rides. The Dream Machine arcade closed in 2025. The historic Fascination game room closed in 2019 due to storm damage. The remains of the Turnpike Cars roadway ride are hidden in overgrowth beside the parking lot, but these remains are visible through Google Maps.

== See also ==
- List of amusement parks in New England
- List of defunct amusement parks
- Amusement ride
