= Six Flags America =

Defunct amusement park in Woodmore, Maryland

- Previously known as The Wildlife Preserve (1974–1978); Wild Country (1978–1981); Wild World (1982–1992); Adventure World (1993–1998)
- Final logo used for the 2025 season

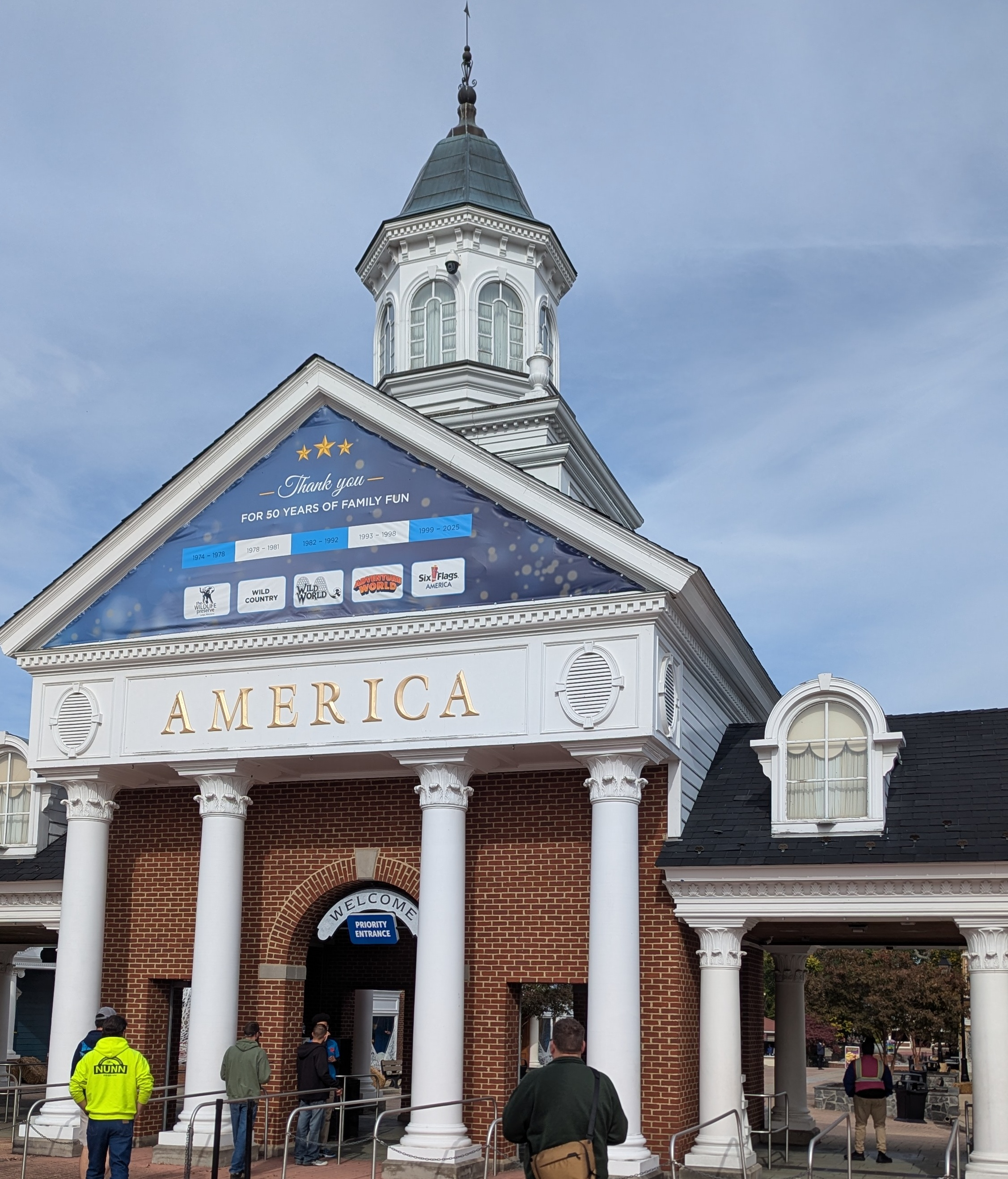
- The entrance to Six Flags America in October 2025, less than one month prior to the park's closure.
- Interactive map of Six Flags America
- Location: 13710 Central Ave, Bowie, MD 20721, Maryland, U.S.
- Coordinates: 38°54′22″N 76°46′21″W
- Status: Defunct
- Opened: July 15, 1974; 52 years ago
- Closed: November 2, 2025; 12 months ago
- Owner: ABC Attractions (1974–1978); Jim Fowler (1978–1980); Wild World (1980–1992); Premier Parks (1992-1998); Six Flags (1998–2025)
- Area: 515 acres (208 ha) (131 acres (53 ha) used for park operations)

Attractions
- Total: 28 (as of November 2, 2025)
- Roller coasters: 8
- Website: www.sixflags.com/america (archived)

Six Flags America was a 131-acre (53 ha) amusement park in Bowie, Maryland, United States, within the Washington, DC, metropolitan area. It had a water park named Hurricane Harbor Maryland. Founded as a wildlife center in 1974 by Ross Perot, ABC television operated the park as a drive-through safari called The Largo Wildlife Preserve, from 1974 until its closure in 1978. The property was bought by Jim Fowler's Wild Kingdom; thereafter, the site was gradually converted from a wildlife preserve into a theme park named Wild World.

In 1992, the park was renamed Adventure World after being acquired by Premier Parks. The park was rebranded as the tenth Six Flags park, after Premier Parks acquired Six Flags Inc., and adopted its name in 1999; the name-change to Six Flags America—and all associated IP and theming—was unveiled for the park's 1999 operating season. Following a 2024 merger between Six Flags and Cedar Fair, the park permanently closed on November 2, 2025, as part of the new Six Flags company's portfolio optimization program. Six Flags sold the park's 515-acre (208 ha) site to Thirty Five Ventures, a firm owned by Kevin Durant, and TPA Group in April 2026 in order to pay down corporate debts. The site is planned for mixed-use redevelopment.

== History ==
=== The Wildlife Preserve ===
The Wildlife Preserve logo 1974

In June 1971, Irish brothers Frank and William Stephenson, who were both animal trainers, approached Texas billionaire Ross Perot about financing an animal park they wanted to open "somewhere on the East Coast of the United States". The Stephensons and Perot formed the company C.T. Industries, Inc., to build and run the park. Ultimately, they narrowed their decision down to the D.C. area, and purchased 280 acres (110 ha) of land in Prince George's County, Maryland. On December 22, 1971, they applied to the Prince George's County planning board for a special zoning exception. The park was announced to the public in February 1972, with a projected opening before the end of that year.

It's quite a lot of fun to see these two fellows [Frank and Williams Stephenson] put this together... I didn't know them at all until they walked into my office with their idea... I'm convinced they have the ability to do this well. I'm just a guy standing there with a grease gun. I can lubricate their idea with financial encouragement.

— Ross Perot

In 1973, plans for the park were taken-over by ABC's Scenic & Wildlife Attractions division (ABCSWA). On April 28, 1973, John E. Campbell (ABCSWA President) confirmed they were negotiating the purchase of another 125 acres (51 ha) for the park. In February 1974, William H. Natter, Jr., who had been vice-president of C.T. Industries, was made vice-president of ABC Scenic and Wildlife Attractions, in addition to general manager of the new park.

The Wildlife Preserve, a drive-through wildlife park, opened on Monday, July 15, 1974. Initially, estimated attendance was approximately 850,000 visitors a year. However, those reasonably ambitious attendance numbers never materialized. In 1975, the park added narrated tours through four-car, 150-person-capacity shuttle trains. However, the park failed to promote itself effectively enough to generate public interest or profits. In an effort to save face, ABCSWA announced a $30m amusement park expansion to the struggling drive-through safari (around $171.6m in 2023).

Plans for the expansion were scrapped, and, in February 1976, it was announced that the park was closed permanently. ABCSWA released a statement, claiming that the park had experienced "unacceptable attendance and revenues" in 1974 and 1975; The Wildlife Preserve itself was said to be a $4m liability for ABC for the year 1975 (approximately $22.8m in 2023).

In June 1976, William H. Natter, Jr., director of the park, revealed most of the park's 350 animals had already been sold off to municipal zoos, animal dealers, and other wildlife preserves. "Fortunately, the animals are bringing the current market value. However, lions are hard to sell. There just isn't a market for them. Their price ranges from gratis to $300," he said. "We are phasing the entire operation out and hope to have everything finished here by July 1."

ABC didn't manage to sell the land until 1978, when the park was sold to Jim Fowler, the host of Wild Kingdom. For the 1979 season, the park was planned to reopen with a guided train tour through the safari exhibits, and a smaller park with a children's playground, animal shows, and a petting zoo. The park never opened for the 1979 season, due to financial issues and remained closed in 1980 as well.

=== Wild World ===
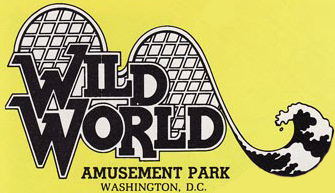
Original Wild World Logo from 1988

In the summer of 1980, the safari was sold to a group of local businessmen, who invested $11 million into expanding the park. The animal drive-through safari remained, and the park added three flat rides, two kids' rides, and a carousel. The park was named Wild World and opened by June 26, 1982. In addition to the select amusement rides, four tube waterslides were added, along with two body slides and a children's water play area. This brought modest improvements in revenue.

The 1982 season saw the addition of four more flat rides, including a Ferris wheel and giant swings. The waterslide area was expanded, at the time, to a full water park; with the addition of more water slides and a large wave pool, a more successful 1983 season was underway. Management spent $2 million adding a wave pool, named the "Wild Wave", which opened May 30 for the 1983 season.

A 9-year-old boy named Christie Davis died late that summer while in the wave pool, which resulted in operational safety changes. The park's attendance had improved, but the park was still unable to break even. During the 1983 season, the safari was closed and the animals were sold after season ended. In 1984, most of the adult rides were removed from the park and held in storage, leaving only three, plus a few of the children's rides. The park opted to move in the direction of being solely a water park. A new stadium was built that year, along with several more water slides. The park would perform very well on hot days, but faltered a bit more in cooler weather, due to the shift in predominantly swimming- and water-based attractions.

In 1985, the rides were therefore brought back out of storage. That year, Wild World's management wanted to build a major wooden rollercoaster for the park in the 1986 season, but the costs were too high. There was widespread opposition to the plan from the surrounding community. In addition to adding a roller coaster, the park intended to add a 3000-seat amphitheater, and an overnight campground for guests.

At the time, Knoebels (an amusement park in Pennsylvania) had acquired a used rollercoaster, Phoenix, from a defunct park in Texas; Wild World's management team was inspired and began looking for a used coaster for Wild World. With Massachusetts' Paragon Park closing at the end of 1984, their "Giant Coaster", which had operated since 1917, was for-sale; in the spring of 1985, Wild World acquired the old PTC coaster, rebranding it "The Wild One" and placing it in an area of the former animal park. The coaster opened in the spring of 1986 to very positive public reviews. A kiddie coaster was added to the park at the same time.

For the 1987 season, Wild World added another water play area and a lazy river. In 1988, the park would see a renovation to its buildings and midways, and a few new flat rides. In 1989, a log flume was added, along with a family raft waterslide in the waterpark. In 1990, the park began to have maintenance issues with many of its carnival-style flat rides, with several unable to be repaired. In 1991, only nine flat rides remained and the park was ultimately put up for sale.

=== Adventure World ===
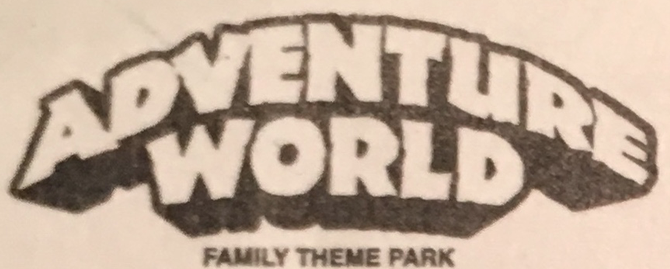
Adventure World logo from a ticket stub

In 1992, Wild World was purchased by Tierco Group Inc., later known as Premier Parks, which renamed the park Adventure World in March 1994. That year several flat rides and a few kiddie rides were added. In 1993, Adventure World added its second adult rollercoaster. Premier Parks had acquired Lightning Loops from Six Flags. This was a dual-track steel single looping shuttle coaster located at Six Flags Great Adventure. One of the tracks was sent to Premier Parks' Frontier City located in Oklahoma City (where it still operates as the Diamondback), while the other track became known as the Python and would be located at Adventure World. Also, a water ride called Shipwreck Falls, in which a 15-person boat would run up a steel track and down a 45-foot (14 m) drop into a splashwater pool, was added. More flat rides were added in 1994. By this time, the new additions were well-received, shown as Inside Track Magazine named Adventure World as the most improved amusement park in the country for a third consecutive year in 1994.

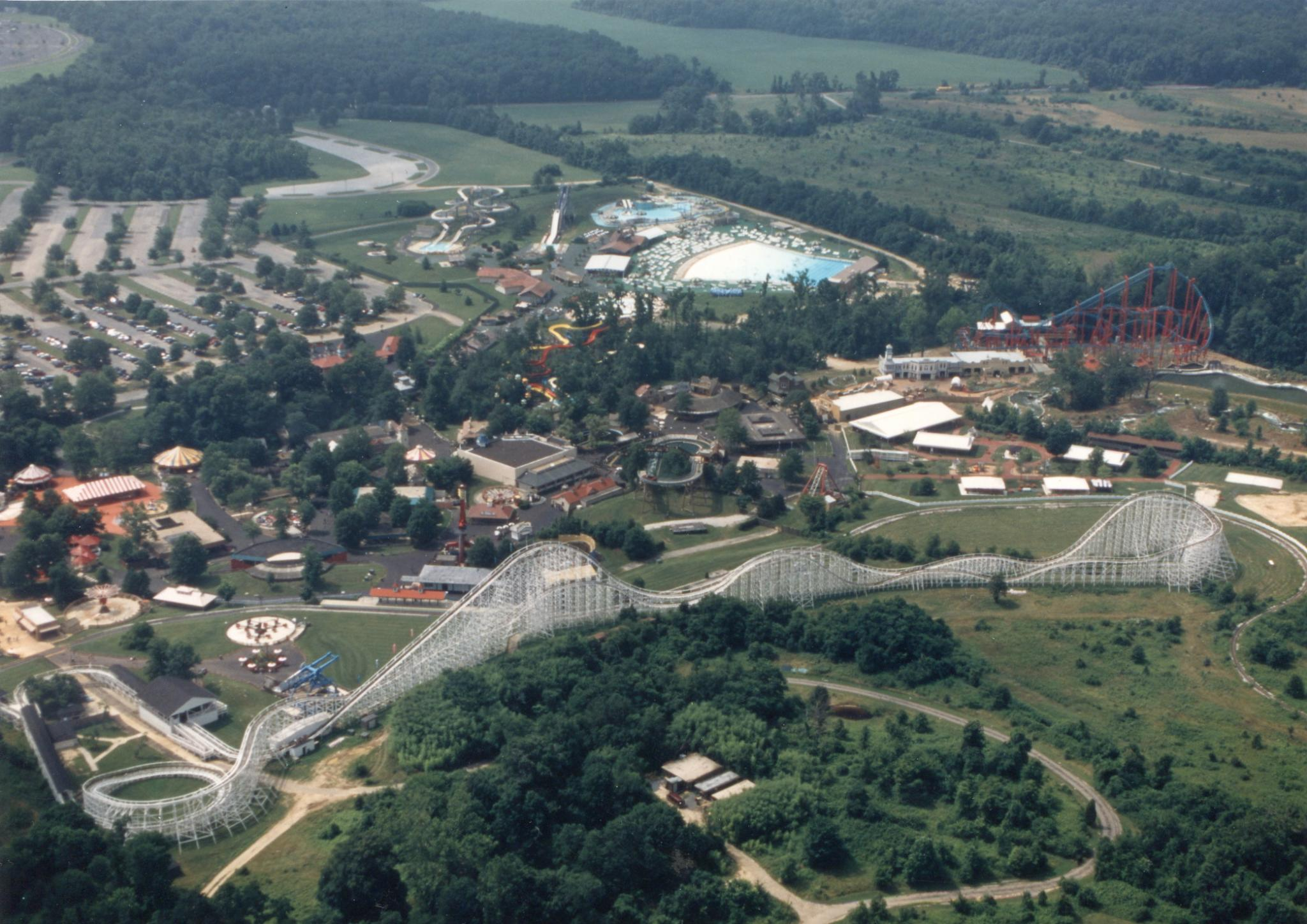
Adventure World in 1996

On May 20, 1995, Vekoma's first Mind Eraser, an inverted looping suspended coaster, opened. This was branded a SLC. In 1996, a free-fall drop-tower ride called the Tower of Doom, now known as Voodoo Drop, made by Intamin was added. In 1997, the park added a second dry water ride called Typhoon Sea Coaster, which was a log flume/junior rollercoaster hybrid. It was later renamed Skull Mountain and eventually closed in July 2011 to make room for a new roller coaster. In 1997, the water park was renovated, eliminating some older slides, adding newer slides and extensively remodeling the children's water play area.

=== Six Flags ownership ===
Premier Parks acquired the Six Flags amusement park chain from Time Warner in April 1998, forming the company Six Flags Incorporated. The same year, a wooden roller coaster called Roar, which was built and designed by Great Coasters International, was added to Adventure World. At the end of 1998 season, Six Flags announced that Adventure World would be branded with the Six Flags theme and renamed Six Flags America for the 1999 season. The park was officially renamed Six Flags America on October 28, 1998, and a large gala was thrown at the park to commemorate the change. Carrot cake was served in honor of Bugs Bunny, the park's new mascot. The name change allowed the park to use the Looney Tunes and DC characters in its marketing.

Other changes included the addition of Gotham City, a new DC comics-themed section in the park named after the fictional city, and three new coasters—Two Face: The Flip Side, The Joker's Jinx (the park's only launched roller coaster), and Great Chase (replacing Cannonball in the kiddie area). Python was closed and moved into storage.

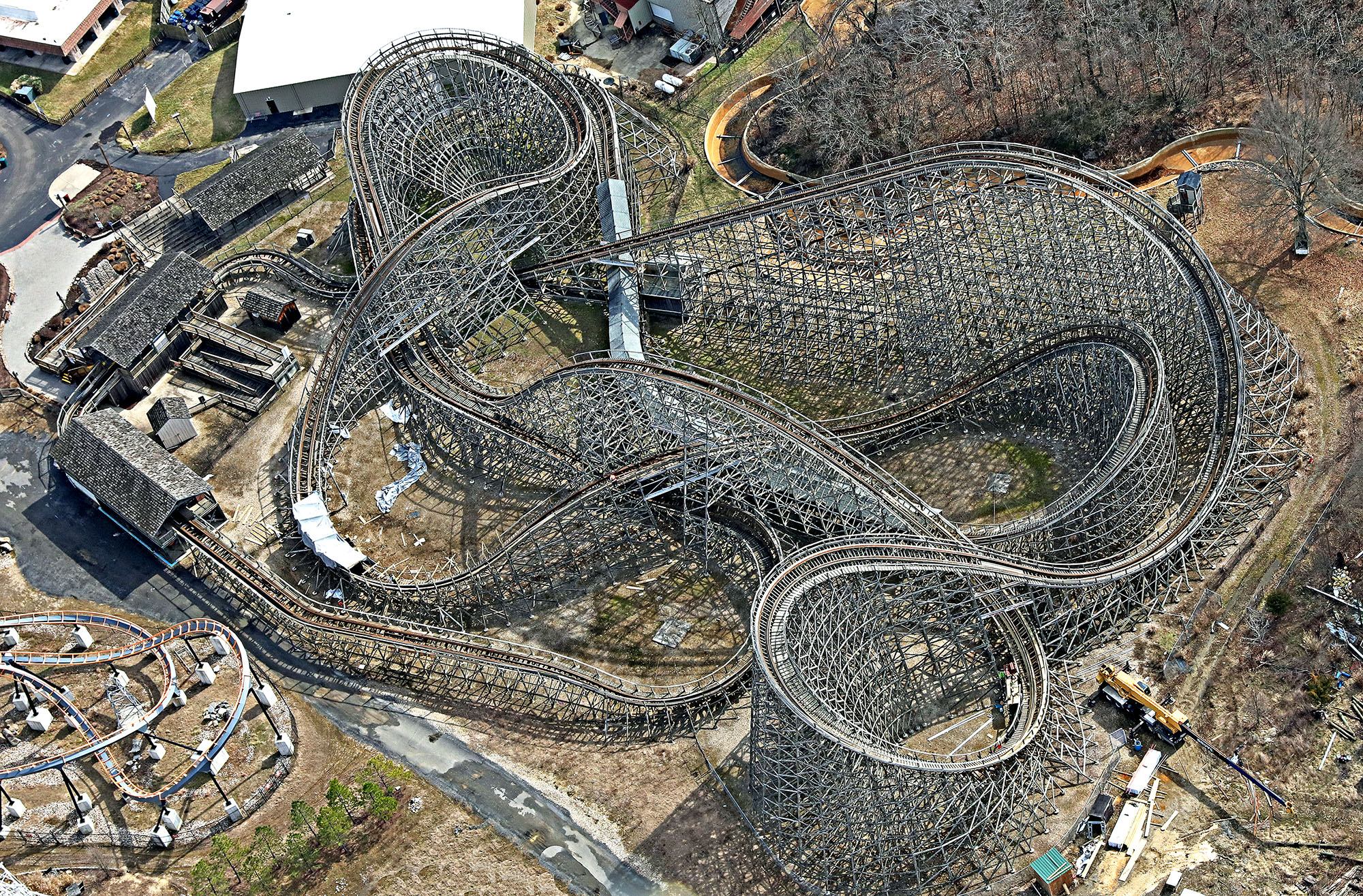
Roar, a wooden roller coaster designed and built by Great Coasters International, opened for the 1998 season.

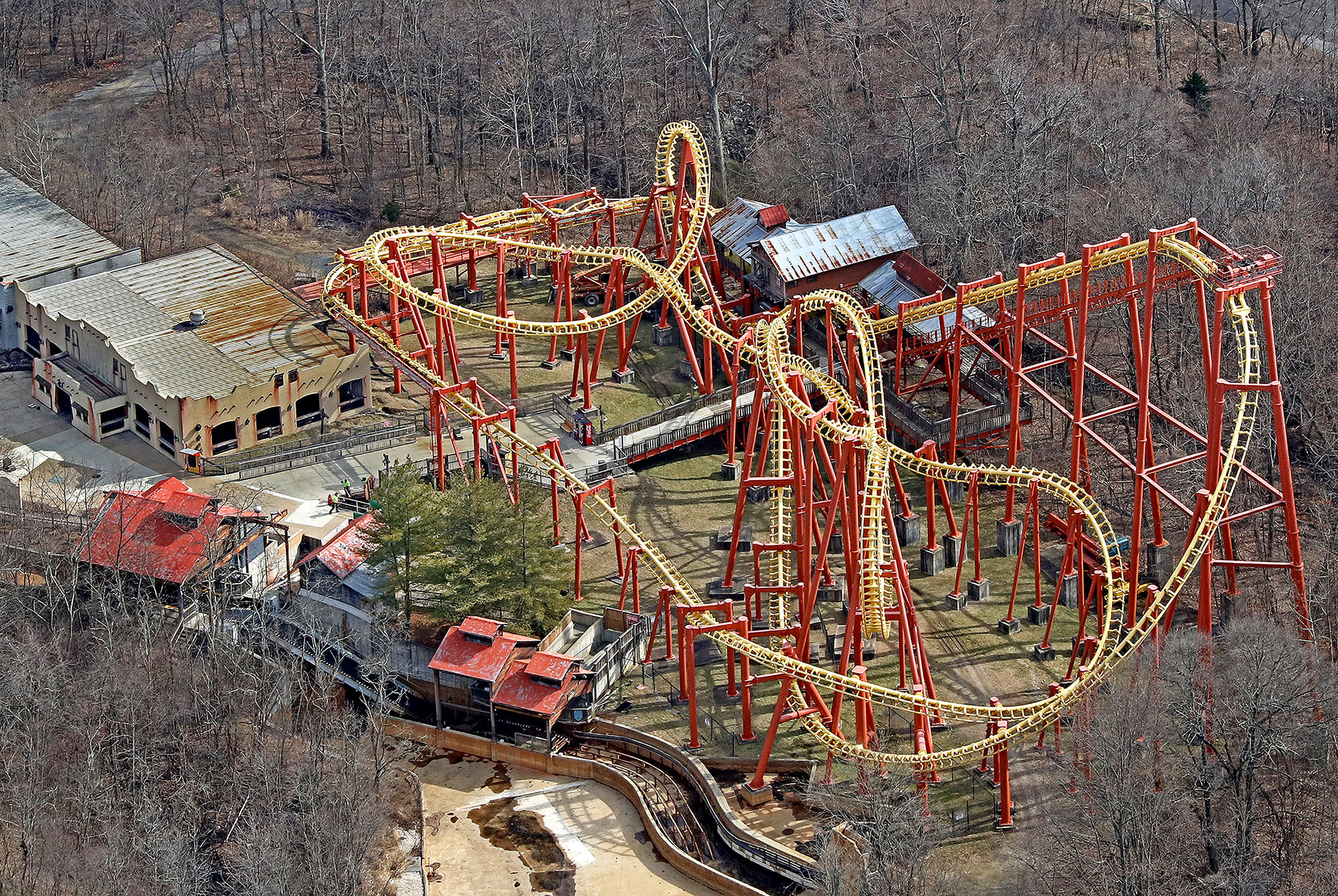
An aerial view of The Mind Eraser in 2016

For the 2000 season, a new hypercoaster called Superman: Ride of Steel from Intamin opened. Its layout is a mirror image of Six Flags Darien Lake's Ride of Steel which opened the previous year. The next year on June 16, the park opened Batwing, a Batman-themed Vekoma flying coaster located in the Gotham City area. A bungee ride called Skycoaster also opened in the area in 2001. Several flat rides were added in 2002 and a river rapids ride called Blizzard River was added in 2003. In 2005, the Paradise Island water park was upgraded and retitled Six Flags Hurricane Harbor. The transition from Paradise Island to Hurricane Harbor saw the addition of a new Tornado water slide as well as renovations to existing attractions and buildings. Tony Hawk's Halfpipe water slide was added in 2008.

In 2010, Six Flags America renovated the Hurricane Bay wave pool deck, adding a new stamped, concrete deck and additional shading. Also the same year, the Thomas Town family area opened featuring eight rides and attractions all themed to Thomas the Tank Engine. The 3.5-acre (14,000 m^{2}) area was billed as North America's largest Thomas Town and marked Six Flags America's largest expansion in more than a decade. Several months later, Six Flags would announce the removal of several licensed agreements as a result of restructuring following the company's emergence from bankruptcy. Thomas the Tank Engine, Tony Hawk, the Wiggles, and Evel Knievel themes would be removed from all Six Flags parks beginning in 2011. At Six Flags America, Thomas Town was renamed Whistlestop Park and Tony Hawk's Halfpipe slide was renamed Halfpipe.

For 2012, the park added Apocalypse, a stand-up roller coaster from Bolliger & Mabillard, which featured two inversions and a ten-story drop. The roller coaster had previously operated as Iron Wolf at Six Flags Great America.

In 2013, the park added the six-slide complex Bonzai Pipelines to Hurricane Harbor.

In 2014, Six Flags re-themed a section of the park to feature Mardi Gras. The area would feature a new roller coaster named Ragin' Cajun and a set of Flying Scooters named French Quarter Flyers. Like Apocalypse, Ragin' Cajun was relocated from Six Flags Great America and it was placed in the former location of Two Face: The Flip Side which was removed from the park in 2007. The Mardi Gras section replaced Southwest Territory and the area's existing rides were rethemed to match the new Mardi Gras theme. Tower of Doom, for example, was renamed Voodoo Drop.

In 2015, a flat ride called Bourbon Street Fireball was added. This ride is commonly known as a Super Loop. Similar rides were also added to three other Six Flags parks.

In 2016, Six Flags America added a new family water play structure to Hurricane Harbor named Splashwater Falls, which replaced the former Crocodile Cal's Beach House.

Six Flags America announced on September 1, 2016, that it would be adding a Funtime Starflyer model, similar to the many SkyScreamer rides at other locations in the chain. At 24 stories (~250-foot (76 m)), Wonder Woman: Lasso of Truth is the tallest ride in the park.

Announced in August 2018, Apocalypse was converted into a floorless coaster and renamed Firebird for the 2019 season.

In 2023, the park announced that the Hurricane Harbor water park (now named Hurricane Harbor Maryland) would receive RipQurl Blaster, the DMV's tallest water coaster.

=== Closure and land sale ===
On July 1, 2024, the park's owner Six Flags and Cedar Fair merged into a new company. After the merger, the newly-formed Six Flags company outlined plans in its first quarterly earnings meeting for a portfolio optimization in the company, which may include closing or selling off some of its locations. A spokesperson from the company after the announcement a day later, stated that the company has no plans to close parks.

Roughly ten months later on May 1, 2025, Six Flags announced in a press release that it would be closing Six Flags America and Hurricane Harbor Maryland as part of its ongoing portfolio optimization program. The park was described by Six Flags' chief financial officer Brian Witherow as being one of two parks in the Six Flags company as being "very low on the ranking of margins." No announcements in the press release were made on the status of the attractions in the park after closing.

Hurricane Harbor Maryland permanently closed on September 6, 2025. Six Flags America permanently closed on November 2, 2025. On November 5, 2025, all 515 acres (208 ha) of land owned by Six Flags was officially listed on the digital market place platform CBRE Deal Flow. It was announced on April 8, 2026, that Thirty Five Ventures (35V), a firm owned by Kevin Durant, and TPA Group acquired the park's land, with intentions of utilizing the property for mixed-use development.

== Location ==
The park was located in Bowie, Maryland, and was situated about 15 miles (24 km) east of Washington, D.C., and 30 miles (48 km) southwest of Baltimore. The park covered 523 acres (212 ha), with 300 available for expansion. It resided on the property of a former tobacco farm, Partnership Mansion.

== Themed sections ==
Six Flags America was divided into seven themed areas inspired by the different extremes of the United States, as well as fictional settings like the City of Gotham, and Looney Tunes Movie Town.

=== Main Street 1776 ===
Main Street 1776, also known as Liberty Street, or just Main Street, was inspired by Colonial North America set during the American Revolution. The buildings featured colonial design and host stores and restaurants. A replica of the Liberty Bell was featured at the entrance of the street.

=== Chesapeake ===
In Chesapeake guests experienced the motifs that surround life on the Chesapeake Bay. It embodied life on the water, featuring Life Savers and fishing nets caught on drift-wood. It was home to Firebird, and Roar. This area was split into two different sections, Skull Island and Olde Boston until Olde Boston was brought back in 2022. Skull Island focused heavily on the inclusion of pirates.

=== Olde Boston ===
A colonial themed area.

=== Looney Tunes Movie Town ===
Looney Tunes Movie Town was inspired by the Looney Tunes cartoons of the 1930s and 1940s and the aesthetic of the era. It allowed guests the chance to visit the homes of the cartoons' stars, such as Bugs Bunny and Granny. The "town" features the Great Chase, a children's coaster that takes guests through the set of the next Looney Tunes cartoon being filmed, starring Wile E. Coyote and the Road Runner.

=== Mardi Gras ===
Formerly South West Territory, Mardi Gras was supposed to be an all year New Orleans Mardi Gras celebration. Added to the park in 2014, the new themed land featured the Ragin' Cajun, a wild mouse coaster where guests are trying to escape the attack of alligators in the Bayou. This land also features the Wild One, a wooden coaster that turned 100 years old in 2017.

=== Gotham City ===
Added in the year 2000, Gotham City was a land that allows guests to experience the darkly industrial district of DC Comics' most notorious city. Guests can be held hostage by the Joker and forced to ride his Jinxed carnival coaster. They can soar above the clouds with Superman on the Ride of Steel.

=== SteamTown ===
Recreating the pioneer days of the American frontier, the land drops guests in the frontier town of Coyote Creek. From its opening in 1994, it had offered entertainment and attractions include Renegade Rapids, a white water rafting ride down the dangerous rivers of the west inspired by the Colorado River. Coyote Creek was home to the Crazy Horse Saloon, a nod to the western saloons where cowboys used to drink and relax.

Six Flags America announced in 2023 that Coyote Creek would be shut down and completely replaced into an appropriately named SteamTown. The portion of the park features a steampunk-esque theming with complete retheming to rides and shopping, as well as a new stunt show. It opened in June 2024 for SFA's 25th anniversary celebration, as announced via Six Flags America's email newsletter directly to passholders.

== Final attractions ==
The following only lists attractions that operated until the park's last day on November 2, 2025.

=== Roller coasters ===
Ride Name	Picture	Opened	Manufacturer	Ride Type	Location	Rating	Notes
Firebird		2012	Bolliger & Mabillard	Floorless Coaster	Chesapeake	5	Relocated from Six Flags Great America, where it was known as Iron Wolf and opened in 1990. Formerly known as Apocalypse: The Last Stand from 2012 to 2018, when the ride was converted from a stand-up coaster to a floorless coaster.
Great Chase		1999	Zamperla	Family Gravity Coaster	Looney Tunes Movie Town	3	A family coaster themed to Wile E. Coyote and the Road Runner.
The Joker's Jinx		1999	Premier Rides	LIM Spaghetti Bowl Coaster	Gotham City	5	Similar layout to Flight of Fear coasters at Kings Island and Kings Dominion, and Poltergeist at Six Flags Fiesta Texas.
Professor Screamore's SkyWinder		1995	Vekoma	Suspended Looping Coaster	Steamtown	5	The first "Mind Eraser"; Vekoma built 27 Suspended Looping Coaster with the same Layout. Formerly known as Mind Eraser. The trains were sent to Canada's Wonderland in 2026 for The Daredeviler
Ragin' Cajun		2014	Reverchon	Spinning Coaster / Original	Mardi Gras	3	Relocated Ragin' Cajun coaster from Six Flags Great America on the site of Two-Face and Python. Relocated to Six Flags Great Adventure in 2026 as Barrels O’ Fun.
Roar		1998	Great Coasters International	Wooden sit down	Chesapeake	5	The first "Roar"; had one duplicate at Six Flags Discovery Kingdom.
Superman: Ride of Steel		2000	Intamin	Megacoaster	Gotham City	5	Mirror image of Ride of Steel coaster at Six Flags Darien Lake.
The Wild One		1986	Dinn Corporation	Wooden	Mardi Gras	5	Relocated from Paragon Park in Hull, Massachusetts as Giant Coaster. Originally built in 1917.

=== Family rides ===
Name	Opened	Manufacturer/Ride Type	Location	Notes
Pirate's Flight	1982	Intamin/Flying Dutchman	Chesapeake	Moved to the former site of the Curving Dervish in 1996.
Capital Railways	1983	General Electric/Train ride	Olde Boston	The 3 ft (914 mm) narrow gauge train ride originally was opened during the Wild World years and was called Wild World Railroad. Under Premier ownership, it was mostly used for catered picnic customers only, it was opened to everyone in 2009.
Carousel	1983	International Amusement/Carousel	Olde Boston	The former stripe colors on the Carousel canopy were yellow and blue in 1988–1998. In the final years of 1999–2025, the colors of the canopy were switched to red and white when Six Flags America opened.
High Seas	1984	Intamin/Swinging ship	Chesapeake	This ride was purchased from the defunct Little England theme park in Florida.
Electro Derby	1990	Preston Amusements/Bumper cars	Steamtown	Formerly named Los Coches and Coyote Creek Crazy Cars.
Cyclone	1993	Eli Bridge/Scrambler	Chesapeake	Moved to the former site of Pirate's Flight in 1996. Formerly known as Scrambler (1993–1996), the ride was renamed to Cyclone when it was moved to the area that where French Quarter Flyers stood when the park closed in 2025, in Mardi Gras. The ride was moved again to Chesapeake in 2011 in the location where The Octopus formerly resided.
Minutemen Motors	1993	Gould Manufacturing Antique cars	Olde Boston	Originally named the Great Race, based on the 1965 film of the same name. The attraction was renamed in 2023.
Tea Cups	1995	Zamperla/Tea cups	Olde Boston	A cover was added for the Tea Cups when park became Six Flags America.
Flying Carousel	1995	Zamperla/Flying carousel	Main Street 1776	Relocated to Six Flags Great Adventure in 2026 as Wave Swinger.
French Quarter Flyers	2014	Larson International/Flying Scooters	Mardi Gras	Located where the rock-wall formerly resided. Relocated to Six Flags Great Adventure in 2026 as Flying Scooters.

=== Thrill rides ===
Name	Opened	Manufacturer/Ride Type	Location	Rating	Notes
Voodoo Drop	1996	Intamin/140 ft (43 m).tall Giant Drop	Mardi Gras	5	Formerly known as Tower of Doom (1996–2013), the ride was renamed Voodoo Drop due to Southwest Territory being rethemed to Mardi Gras in 2014.
Wonder Woman Lasso of Truth	2017	Funtime / Starflyer	Gotham City	5	A 24-story (242-foot (74 m)) swing ride, similar to other parks. It was the tallest ride in the park.
Harley Quinn Spinsanity	2021	Zamperla / Giant Discovery	Gotham City	4	
SteamWhirler	2024	Zamperla Nebulaz	Steamtown	5	The last ride added to the park. Relocated to Six Flags Great Adventure in 2026 as Hypno Twister.

=== Upcharge rides ===
Name	Opened	Manufacturer/Ride Type	Location	Notes
Big Easy Speedway	1996	J&J Amusements/Go-karts	Mardi Gras	Extra-charge attraction. Formerly known as Sahara Speedway (1996–2003) and Sonora Speedway (2004–2013), the ride was renamed Big Easy Speedway due to Southwest Territory being rethemed to Mardi Gras in 2014.

=== Kids' rides ===
Six Flags America's kids' section was Looney Tunes Movie Town. The former kids' areas in the park were Thomas Town which only operated during the 2010 season and Whistlestop Park.

Name	Opened	Manufacturer/Ride Type	Location	Notes
Elmer's Around the World in 80 Seconds	1993	Zamperla/Kiddie balloon flight	Looney Tunes Movie Town	Named Balloon Flight until 1999.
Foghorn Leghorn's Tinsel Town Train	1993	Zamperla/Kiddie train ride	Looney Tunes Movie Town	Named Circus Train until 1999.
Looney Tunes Prop Warehouse	1999	Kiddie soft play area	Looney Tunes Movie Town	
Pepe Le Pew's Tea Party	1999	Zamperla/Kiddie tea cups	Looney Tunes Movie Town	
Sylvester's Pounce and Bounce	1999	Kiddie drop ride	Looney Tunes Movie Town	
Taz's Film Works	1999	Kiddie swings ride	Looney Tunes Movie Town	
Yosemite Sam's Hollywood Flight School	1999	Kiddie airplane ride	Looney Tunes Movie Town	Originally called Movie Town Airport (1999–2004).

== Former attractions ==
=== Roller coasters ===
Name	Opened	Closed In	Manufacturer/Ride Type	Former Location	Notes
Batwing	2001	2025	Vekoma Flying Dutchman	Gotham City	See Incidents at Six Flags parks for more information. This roller coaster was closed permanently following an accident that occurred on July 8, 2025.
Python	1993	1998	Arrow Dynamics Launched Loop	Southwest Territory	Ride was moved from Six Flags Great Adventure (one half of Lightning Loops).
The Great Alonzo's Cannonball Coaster	1993	1998	Molina & Son's kiddie coaster	A Day At The Circus	
Two Face: The Flip Side	1999	2007	Vekoma Invertigo roller coaster	Southwest Territory	See Incidents at Six Flags parks for more information. This roller coaster was sent to Italy and opened in 2015.

=== Rides ===
Including former Hurricane Harbor water slides.

Name	Opened	Removed in	Manufacturer/Ride type	Notes
Curving Dervish	1982	1995	Bayern Curve	Exact history not known.
Aerial Elephants	1993	1998	Kiddie ride	
Clown Around	1993	1998	Kiddie ride	
Clown Town	1993	1998	Kiddie attraction	
Flying Trapeze	1993	1998	Kiddie attraction	
Kiddie Bumper Boats	1993	1998	Kiddie ride	
Lippazanion Stallions	1993	1998	Kiddie attraction	
Roller Racers	1993	1998	Kiddie ride	
The Juggler	1993	1998	Kiddie ride	
SkyEscaper	1983	2004	Fahtz / IAD Enterprise 16	The ride was closed in 2002.
Iron Eagle	1995	2005	Zamperla Rotoshake	
Krypton Comet	2000	2005	Chance-Morgan Chaos	
Lily Pad Walk	1982	2005		Located in Hurricane Harbor.
The Tilt	1989	2006	Tilt-a-Whirl	
The Animation Department	1999	2007	Kiddie Carousel	
Circus of the Stars	1982	2007	Kiddie bumper cars	
Avalanche	1999	2010	Chance-Morgan Alpine Bobs	Located in Gotham City. Named Penguins Bobsleds (1999–2003), Alpine Bobs (2003–2006) moved to former Krypton Comet location and renamed in 2006.
The Octopus	2000	2010	Sartori Polyp, monster style ride	Located in Nantucket. On August 3, 2007, a 6-year-old girl was injured on this ride. See Incidents at Six Flags parks for more information.
Skull Mountain	1997	2011	Intamin Reversing Boat Ride 8 water ride	Named Typhoon Sea Coaster, ride was modified and name changed in 2007. The ride took its last voyage on July 10, 2011, and was replaced by Apocalypse: The Last Stand
Sky Coaster	2001	2018	Skycoaster, Inc./Sky coaster	Located in Gotham City. Extra-charge attraction. Removed for Harley Quinn Spinsanity.
Zydeco Zinger	1993	2023	Chance Rides/Falling Star	Was located in Mardi Gras. Formerly known as Falling Star, the ride was renamed to Zydeco Zinger due to Southwest Territory being rethemed to Mardi Gras in 2014.
Bourbon Street Fireball	2015	2023	Larson International/Giant Loop	Was located in Mardi Gras.
Rodeo	1999	2022	Huss/Breakdance	Was located in Coyote Creek (Steamtown). A Huss Breakdance style 4/rodeo with cow themed cars.
Sky Jumper	2010	2022	Zamperla Family drop ride	Was located at Whistlestop Park. It was known as Cranky the Crane Tower in 2010 in Thomas Town and rethemed in 2011. The ride was relocated to Six Flags Over Texas in 2024.
Up, Up & Away	1993	2022	Zamperla/Family size ferris wheel	Whistlestop Park, Used to be located in Olde Boston as Around the World in 80 Days from 1993 - 2009. Moved in Thomas Town in 2010 as Sodor Carnival Ferris Wheel and rethemed in 2011.
Happy Junction	2010	2022	Kiddie convoy ride	Whistlestop Park, It was known as Diesel Derby in 2010 in Thomas Town and rethemed in 2011.
Splash Zone	2010	2022	Pop jet fountain	Whistlestop Park, It was known as Thomas Town Pop Jet Fountain in 2010 in Thomas Town and rethemed in 2011.
Whistlestop Bus Line	2010	2022	Zamperla/Kiddie crazy bus	Whistlestop Park, It was known as Bertie the Bus in 2010 in Thomas Town and rethemed in 2011.
Whistlestop Park Playground	2010	2022	Playground	Whistlestop Park, It was known as Thomas Town Play Structure in 2010 in Thomas Town and rethemed in 2011.
Whistlestop Train	2010	2022	Family train ride	Whistlestop Park, It was known as Thomas the Tank Engine in 2010 in Thomas Town and rethemed in 2011.
Whistlestop Whirlybirds	2010	2022	I.E. Park/Mini flight	Whistlestop Park, It was known as Harold the Helicopter in 2010 in Thomas Town and rethemed in 2011.
Shipwreck Falls	1993	2025	Hopkins Rides/Shoot the chute water ride	Closed prior to the park closing on September 6, 2025.
QuantumCanyon Rapids	1995	2025	Hopkins Rides/Rapids water ride	Formerly Called Renegade Rapids. Closed prior to the park closing on September 6, 2025.
Penguin's Blizzard River	2003	2025	WhiteWater West/Spinning rapids water ride.	Closed prior to the park closing on September 6, 2025.
Kids' Cove	1982	2005	Kids area	Located in Hurricane Harbor
Crocodile Cal's Caribbean Beach House	1997	2014	Kids' activity area	Named Crocodile Cal's Outback Beach House until 2005 – the "Cal's" portion of the name came from Baltimore Orioles' player Cal Ripken. Located in Hurricane Harbor. Replaced by Splashwater Falls.
ZoomAzon Falls	1982	2020	Four Water slides	Located in Hurricane Harbor. Named Rainbow Falls until 2004, and Hurricane Mountain from 2005 to 2008. Formerly tube slides. Closed 2008–2010. Rethemed to an Amazon rainforest and reopened June 2011. Retired following the 2020 season.
Riddle Me This	1983	2023	Frank Hrubetz & Company/Round up	Originally Named World Wind, location moved to Gotham City section in 1999.

=== Six Flags Hurricane Harbor Maryland ===
Hurricane Harbor Maryland was a water park located within Six Flags America. It was previously known as Paradise Island until 2005 when it was rebranded Hurricane Harbor. Hurricane Harbor Maryland permanently closed on September 6, 2025. This list includes all rides that were at the water park when it closed:

Name	Opened	Manufacturer/Ride Type	Notes
Calypso Cannonballs	1987	2 small tube drop slides	Named Caribbean Cannonball Flume until 2004
Riptide		Small body slides	Named Luau Loop until 2004
Vortex		Small body slides	Named Luau Loop until 2004
Bamboo Chutes		Small body slides	Named Kid's Flumes until 2004
Hurricane Bay	1982	WaveTek/Wave pool	Opening as Wild Wave in 1983, and later renamed Monsoon Lagoon until 2004; One of the largest wave pools in the world
Paradise Plunge	1994	Proslide Technology Inc./Pipeline	Named Tahiti Twister until 2004
Reef Runner	1994	Proslide Technology Inc./Pipeline	Named Tahiti Twister until 2004
Hammerhead	1997	Proslide Technology Inc./Giant twister	Named Black Hole until 2004
Mako	1997	Proslide Technology Inc./Drop slide	Named Bonzai Pipeline until 2004
Bahama Blast	2005	Proslide Technology Inc./Mammoth	
Buccaneer Beach	2005	Kiddie/family activity area	
Tornado	2005	Proslide Technology Inc./Tornado 60	
The Halfpipe	2008	Water Fun Products/Sidewinder	Waterslide half-pipe for one or two riders. It was known as Tony Hawk's Halfpipe from 2008 to 2010 and rethemed in 2011.
Bonzai Pipelines	2013	SplashTacular DownUnder	Six slides on one complex structure.
Splashwater Falls	2016	Family water play structure	Containing 7 Slides, a Tipping Bucket, and Interactive Elements
Wahoo River	2018	Wave river	Contains tipping cones, and rolling waves
RipQurl Blaster	2023	WhiteWater West water coaster	The DMV's tallest water coaster.

=== Rehabilitations ===
These rides were renamed following improvements to them.

Name	Opened	Removed in	Manufacturer/Ride type	Notes
Castaway Creek	1982	2017	Lazy River	Became Wahoo River.
Apocalypse	2012	2018	Bolliger and Mabillard Stand-up coaster	Gained floorless trains and renamed Firebird.
