= The Wild One (roller coaster) =

Defunct wooden roller coaster at Six Flags America

- Previously known as The Giant Coaster (1917-1984)
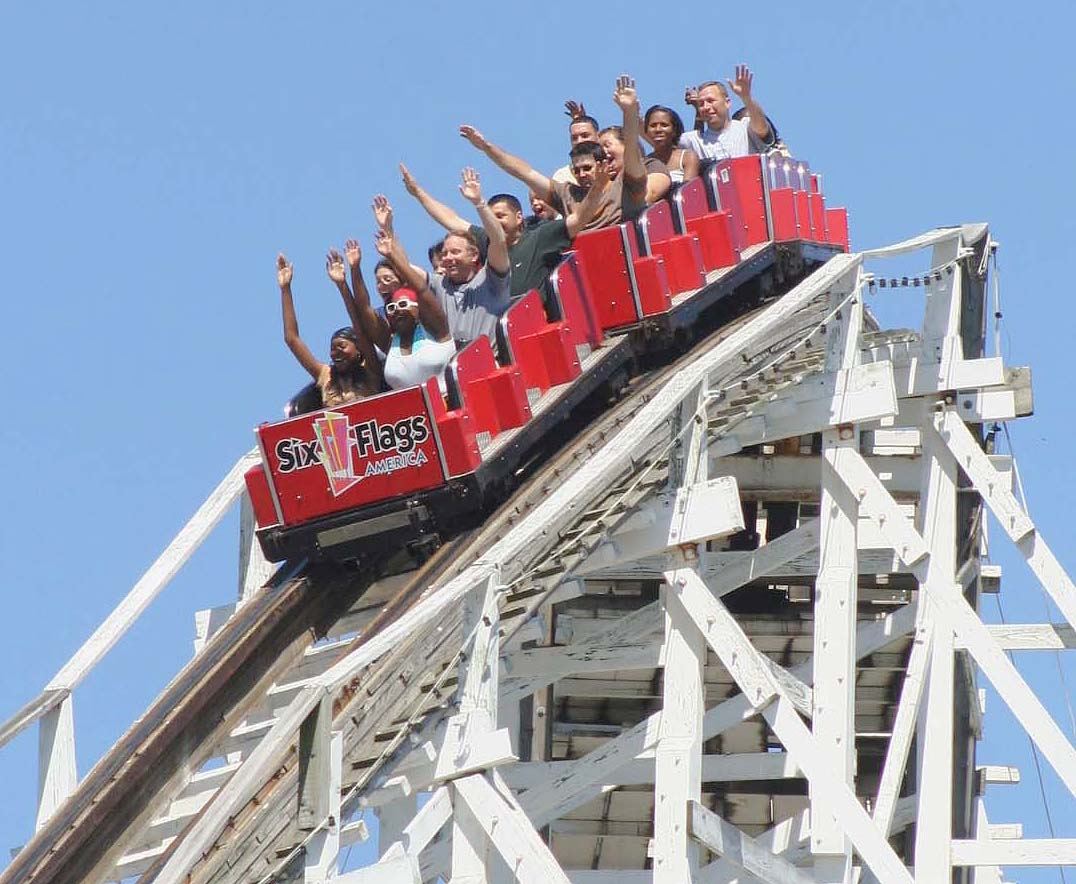

Six Flags America
- Location: Six Flags America
- Park section: Mardi Gras
- Coordinates: 38°54′33″N 76°46′21″W
- Status: Closed
- Opening date: 1986
- Closing date: November 2, 2025

Paragon Park
- Coordinates: 42°16′05.6″N 70°51′16.6″W
- Status: Removed
- Opening date: 1917
- Closing date: 1984

General statistics
- Type: Wood
- Manufacturer: Philadelphia Toboggan Coasters
- Designer: John A. Miller; Herbert Schmeck
- Height: 98 ft (30 m)
- Drop: 88 ft (27 m)
- Length: 4,000 ft (1,200 m)
- Speed: 53 mph (85 km/h)
- Inversions: 0
- Duration: 1:52
- Height restriction: 48 in (122 cm)
- Trains: 2 trains with 4 cars; riders arranged 2 across in 3 rows for a total of 24 riders per train
- Flash Pass was Available
- The Wild One at RCDB

The Wild One is a decommissioned wooden roller coaster at Six Flags America in Prince George's County, Maryland. It features a 450° spiral helix and a series of bunny hills that produce a significant amount of air time. The wooden coaster was previously known as Giant Coaster when it was located at Paragon Park in Hull, Massachusetts. It operated there from 1917 to 1984. It is the oldest coaster in any Six Flags park.

== History ==
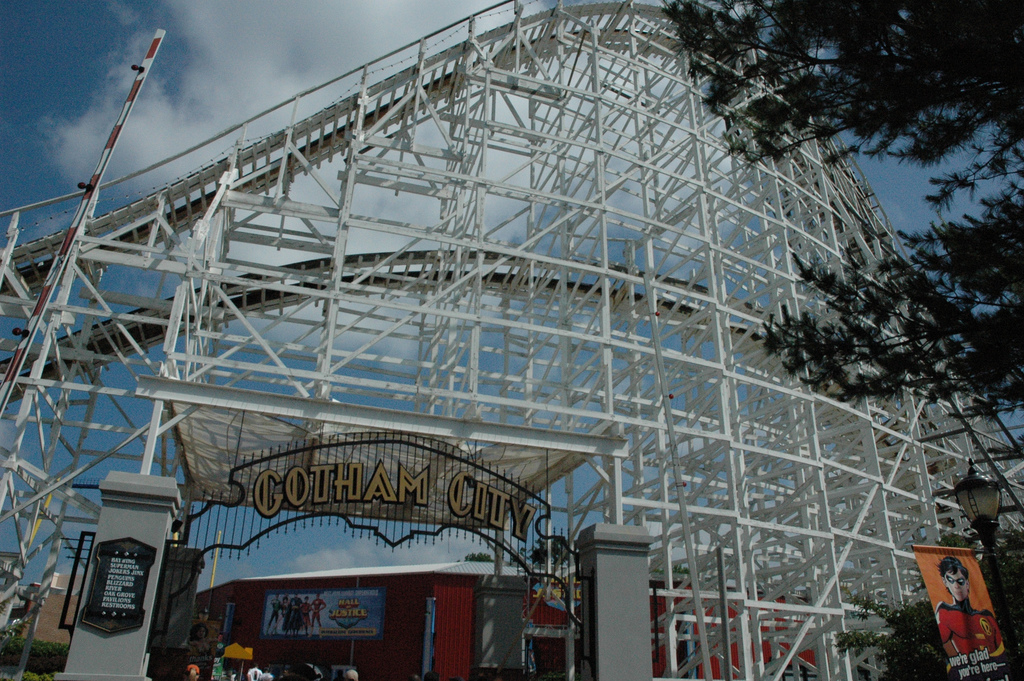
Wild One track over the entrance for Gotham City at Six Flags America

When the roller coaster first opened on May 26, 1917, it was The Giant Coaster at Paragon Park in Nantasket Beach, Massachusetts. The Giant Coaster was a double out-and-back side-friction coaster designed by John A. Miller and built by Herbert Paul Schmeck of the Philadelphia Toboggan Company (PTC). In 1932, after it was partially destroyed by fire, Schmeck redesigned much of the ride using an underfriction track system. In April 1963, another fire destroyed the station, trains, double helix finale and part of the lift hill. The park asked John C. Allen president of PTC to rebuild the coaster as it was, but his estimate proved too high for the traditional park. Instead he left out two bunny hops and the helix finale in order to create an angled approach into the brake run. Although nowhere near as exciting as Miller's finish, Allen gave the park an affordable alternative to tearing down the coaster.

On July 19, 1963, Forest Park Highlands in St. Louis suffered from a massive fire, but its roller coaster, Comet, remained standing. When Comet was torn down in 1968, Paragon Park bought its trains as opposed to buying more expensive ones from PTC. The trains continued to have the name "Comet" labeled on the front car during the remaining years of Giant Coaster's operation.

=== Sale and move ===
The Giant Coaster closed with Paragon Park in 1984 and was sold to Wild World (now Six Flags America), which acquired the ride in a last minute bid at auction in June, 1985 for $28,000. Charlie Dinn of the Dinn Corporation was contracted to relocate the ride and supervised the reconstruction. Curtis D. Summers reworked sections of the layout, and restored the helix finale that had been lost in the 1963 fire. The ride opened on May 3, 1986, as The Wild One; although popular with riders was considered to be fairly intense. The financially plagued park owners had difficulties maintaining the coaster, and it quickly developed a reputation for being rough. Several rides, including the coaster, did not open for the 1991 season.

=== Current design ===
In the winter of 1991–92, the remaining attraction was sold to Tierco Group, Inc. Tierco hired John F. Pierce Associates to refurbish the coaster. The first and second drops were dramatically reprofiled, and the rest of the ride was fine-tuned with portions reprofiled. In subsequent years, the ride has been retracked multiple times with much of the recent work completed by Martin & Vleminckx. American Coaster Enthusiasts awarded The Wild One the organization's Coaster Landmark award on June 20, 2018.

=== Future ===
On May 1, 2025, it was announced that Six Flags America would not reopen for the 2026 season, closing on November 2, 2025. The status on the future of the Wild One roller coaster was not given at the time of the announcement.

== Records ==
When The Giant Coaster opened in 1917, at 98 feet (30 m) tall, it was the tallest roller coaster in the world. Its record was not surpassed until 1925 when the 100-foot (30 m) tall Revere Beach Cyclone opened.

== Awards ==
Golden Ticket Awards: Top wood Roller Coasters
Year									1998	1999
Ranking									–	–
Year	2000	2001	2002	2003	2004	2005	2006	2007	2008	2009
Ranking	–	–	–	–	–	–	–	–	–	–
Year	2010	2011	2012	2013	2014	2015	2016	2017	2018	2019
Ranking	–	–	–	–	–	–	–	–	–	–
Year	2020	2021	2022	2023	2024	2025	2026			
Ranking	N/A	–	–	–	–	37 (tie)	–			

Preceded by Unknown	World's Tallest Roller Coaster; 1917–1925	Succeeded by Cyclone
Preceded by Unknown	World's Tallest Complete Circuit Roller Coaster; 1917–1925	Succeeded by Cyclone
