= Corkscrew (disambiguation) =

A corkscrew is a tool for drawing stopping corks from bottles.

Corkscrew may also refer to:

== Fictional entities ==
- Corkscrew (comics), a mutant in Marvel Comics' X-Statix

== Roller coasters ==
- Corkscrew (roller coaster element), a type of roller coaster inversion
- Corkscrew (Alton Towers), a defunct roller coaster at Alton Towers in the United Kingdom
- Corkscrew (Cedar Point), at Cedar Point in Sandusky, Ohio, United States
- Corkscrew (Michigan's Adventure), at Michigan's Adventure in Muskegon, Michigan, United States
- Corkscrew (Playland), at Playland in Vancouver, British Columbia, Canada
- Corkscrew (Silverwood), at Silverwood, Athol, Idaho, United States
- Corkscrew (Valleyfair), at Valleyfair in Shakopee, Minnesota, United States
- Canobie Corkscrew, at Canobie Lake Park in Salem, New Hampshire, United States
- Sea Viper (roller coaster), formerly known as Corkscrew at Sea World, Australia

== Sports ==
- Corkscrew, a professional wrestling aerial technique
- Korketrekkeren ("The Corkscrew"), a former Olympic bobsled track in Oslo, Norway
- "The Corkscrew", a turn on WeatherTech Raceway Laguna Seca, a racetrack near Monterey, California

== Other uses ==
- Corkscrew (program), SSH over HTTPS
- Corkscrew esophagus, an appearance of Diffuse esophageal spasm
- Corkscrew landing, in aviation
- Corkscrew Road, in Florida
- Corkscrew Road, South Australia, scenic route
- Corkscrew Swamp Sanctuary, a tree and bird sanctuary in Florida
- Genlisea, the corkscrew plant
- Graveyard spiral or spin (aerodynamics) is called a corkscrew in colloquial aviation
- Operation Corkscrew, Allied invasion of Sicily in World War II

== See also ==
- Bottle opener, a device that enables the removal of metal bottle caps from bottles
- Helix, a twisted shape like a spring, screw, or spiral staircase
- Tube curls, a ringlet hairstyle resembling a corkscrew
- Water slide, a type of slide designed for warm-weather or indoor recreational use at water parks
