= Jetstream (roller coaster) =

Former roller coaster at Riverview Park

Riverview Park
- Location: Riverview Park
- Coordinates: 41.9418°N 87.6907°W
- Status: Removed
- Opening date: 1964
- Closing date: 1967

General statistics
- Type: Wood
- Manufacturer: Philadelphia Toboggan Coasters
- Designer: John C. Allen
- Jetstream at RCDB

Jetstream was a wooden roller coaster located at Riverview Park in Chicago, Illinois, United States. It was built in 1964 and demolished only three years later in 1967 when the park abruptly closed. Jetstream, which was built to replace the park's aging Gee Wiz roller coaster, was not fully paid off when demolished. It was not as profitable as some of the more intense coasters at the park, such as Bobs and Big Dipper.

Jetstream was designed by John C. Allen and built by Philadelphia Toboggan Coasters.
