= Woodstock Express (Michigan's Adventure) =

Roller coaster at Michigan's Adventure

- Previously known as Big Dipper (1999–2019)
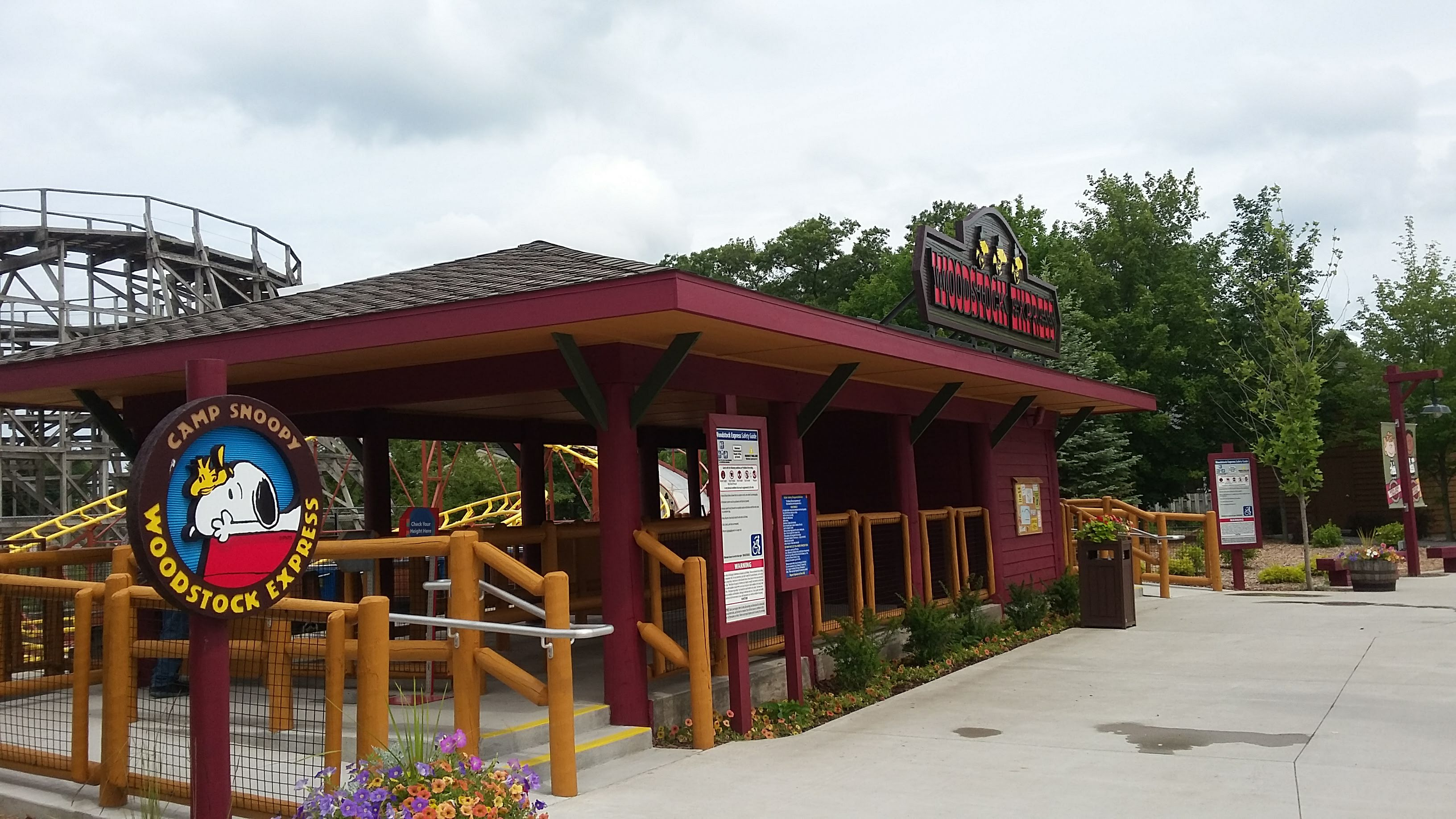

Michigan's Adventure
- Location: Michigan's Adventure
- Park section: Camp Snoopy
- Coordinates: 43.342255°N 86.280741°W
- Status: Operating
- Opening date: July 10, 1999

General statistics
- Type: Steel
- Manufacturer: Chance Rides
- Designer: Chance Rides
- Model: Big Dipper
- Lift/launch system: Drive tire lift hill
- Height: 16.1 ft (4.9 m)
- Inversions: 0
- Height restriction: 36 in (91 cm)
- Trains: Single train with 4 cars; riders arranged 2 across in 2 rows for a total of 16 riders per train
- Woodstock Express at RCDB

Woodstock Express is a steel children's roller coaster at Michigan's Adventure in Muskegon, Michigan. It was manufactured by Chance Rides and opened in 1999.

The roller coaster was originally named Big Dipper, and was a part of a large upgrade to the park. Mad Mouse was installed at the park in 1999 as well.

In 2019, it was announced that Big Dipper would be relocated to the upcoming Camp Snoopy section of the park for 2020, and was to be renamed Woodstock Express. This was delayed due to the COVID-19 pandemic, but it was eventually completed in 2021.
