= Raging Wolf Bobs =

Defunct wooden roller coaster

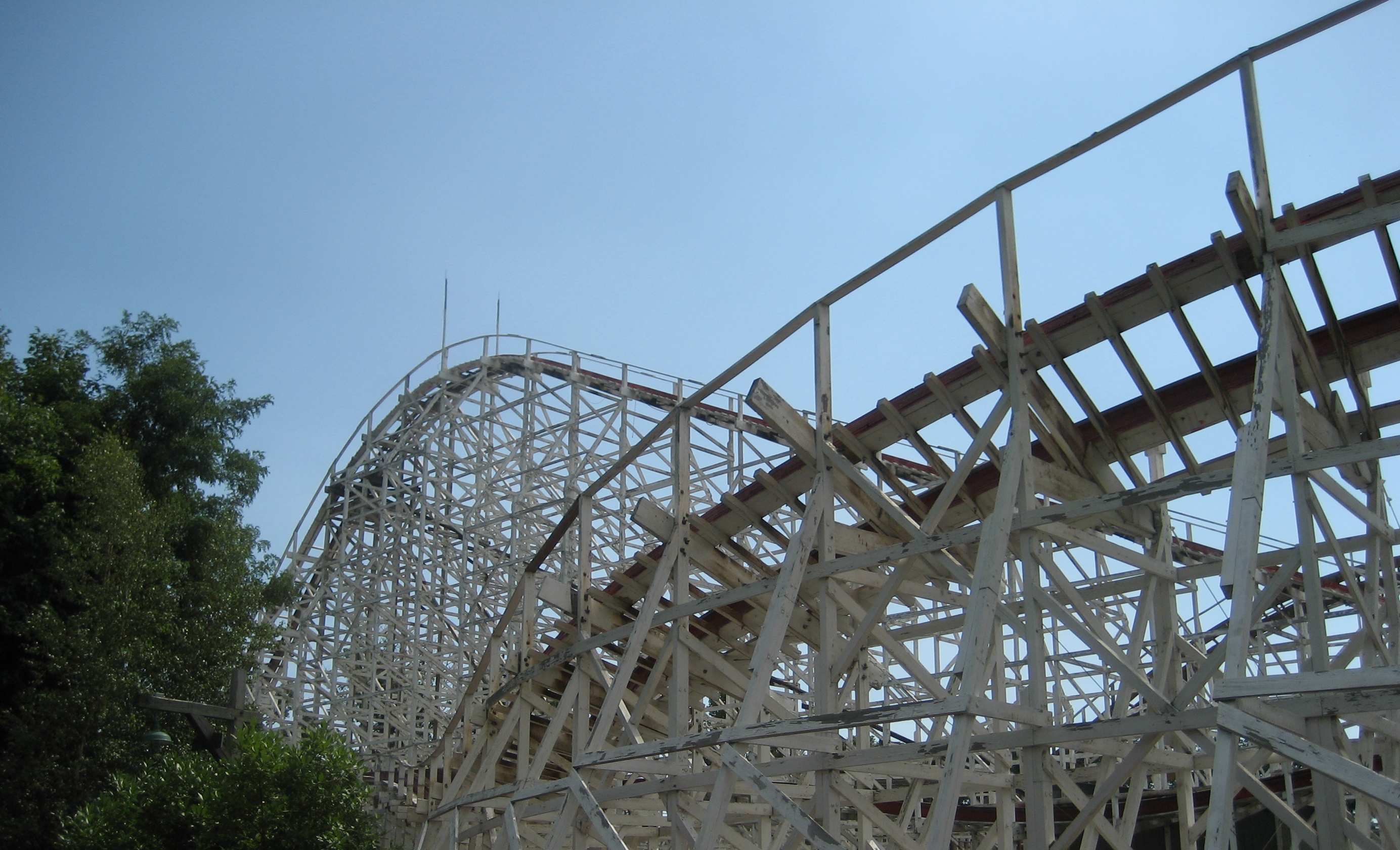
- Raging Wolf Bobs in 2007

Geauga Lake
- Location: Geauga Lake
- Coordinates: 41.352467°N 81.372197°W
- Status: Removed
- Opening date: May 28, 1988
- Closing date: June 16, 2007
- Cost: $2,500,000

General statistics
- Type: Wood
- Manufacturer: Dinn Corporation
- Designer: Curtis D. Summers
- Lift/launch system: Chain lift hill
- Height: 80 ft (24 m)
- Length: 3,426 ft (1,044 m)
- Speed: 50 mph (80 km/h)
- Inversions: 0
- Duration: 2:00
- Max vertical angle: 50°
- Height restriction: 48 in (122 cm)
- Trains: 2 trains with 6 cars. Riders are arranged 2 across in 2 rows for a total of 24 riders per train.
- Raging Wolf Bobs at RCDB

Raging Wolf Bobs was a wooden roller coaster located at Geauga Lake amusement park in Ohio. Designed by Curtis D. Summers to resemble Bobs, a popular roller coaster at the defunct Riverview Park in Chicago, Raging Wolf Bobs was constructed by the Dinn Corporation and opened to the public in 1988. It operated until June 16, 2007, following an accident involving the derailment of a train that unexpectedly rolled backward on one of the track's hills. After remaining closed for the rest of that season, park owners Cedar Fair announced the permanent closure of Geauga Lake, sealing the fate of Raging Wolf Bobs.

== History ==
Geauga Lake owner Funtime, Inc. planned to add a new roller coaster – the park's first in ten years – to celebrate the park's centennial anniversary in 1988. Dinn Corporation was hired to install the new ride with the help of Curtis D. Summers, who modeled the design of the roller coaster after Bobs, a coaster from the 1920s which operated at Chicago's Riverview Park until 1967. An investment of $2.5 million, Raging Wolf Bobs opened to the public on May 28, 1988. It was marketed with the slogan "The legend of terror returns". The ride was retracked throughout its life by Martin & Vleminckx.

Following the park's permanent closure in 2007, Raging Wolf Bobs was sold in an auction to an unnamed buyer for $2,500 on June 17, 2008. In 2011, the coaster's slow dismantling began, and it was completed by early 2014.

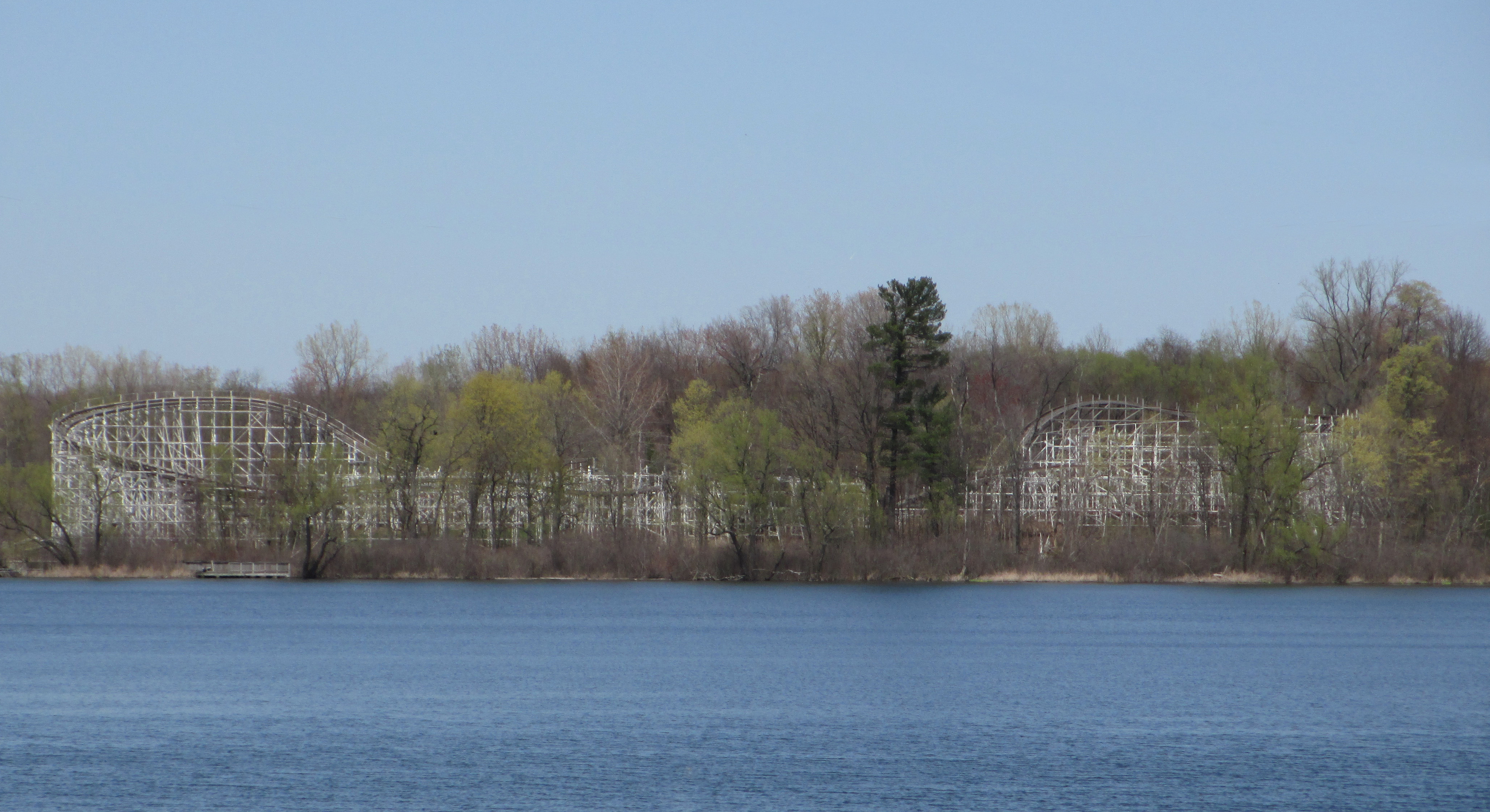
Remains of Raging Wolf Bobs in April 2013

== Incident ==
On June 16, 2007, a train failed to climb a hill and rolled backward. The last car of a train partially derailed in the process, but there were no injuries. The incident, which caused significant damage, closed the attraction for the remainder of the season. Geauga Lake owner Cedar Fair announced the permanent closure of the amusement park on September 21, 2007, ending the attraction's run at Geauga Lake.

== See also ==
- Incidents at Cedar Fair parks
