= Flying Cars =

Former amusement ride at Riverview Park

Flying Cars was an attraction at Riverview Park in Chicago, Illinois, United States. The ride was introduced in 1954.

The attraction consisted of a barrel with a track inside for single-rider cars to ride freewheel. The cars were held onto the drum by a rail and floating clamp system. As the drum would spin, the cars would follow the track and eventually begin to invert. The drum steadily increased its speed and the cars would let it roll beneath their wheels as they followed the track. The cars' brakes were then applied, causing them to quickly accelerate up to the speed of the drum's surface, around 30 mph (48 km/h). The operator would spin the drum for two minutes and then release the brakes, causing the cars to come to a complete stop while the drum slowed to a halt.

There was a fatality on the ride when a rider failed to properly fasten her safety belt and was killed after falling out of her car. The attraction was shut down and removed shortly thereafter due to safety concerns.
