= Joris en de Draak =

Wooden racing coaster at Efteling

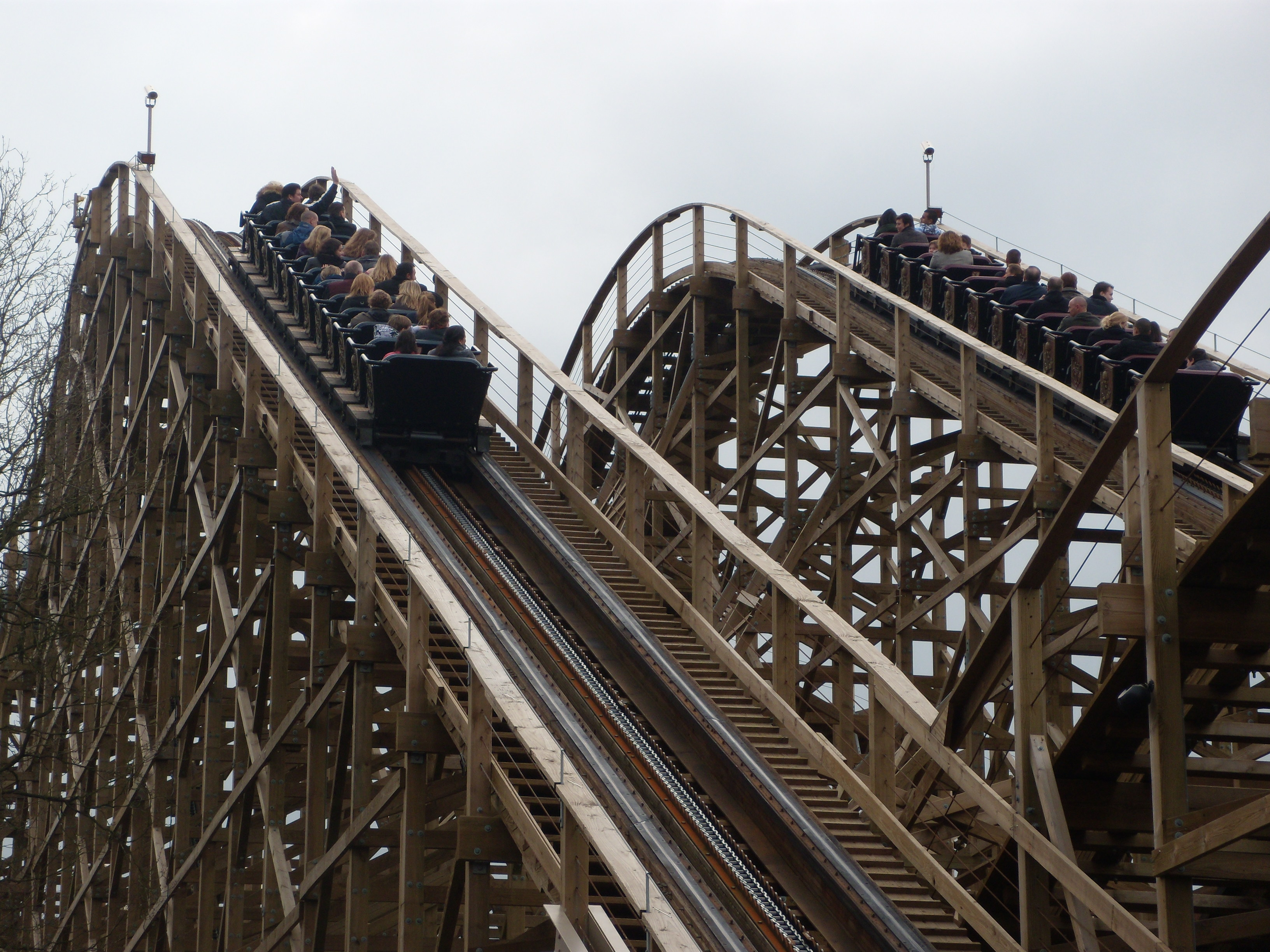
- Both trains going up the lift hill

Efteling
- Park section: Ruigrijk
- Coordinates: 51°38′49″N 5°03′09″E
- Status: Operating
- Opening date: July 1, 2010
- Cost: €13,000,000
- Replaced: Pegasus

General statistics
- Type: Wood – Racing
- Manufacturer: Great Coasters International
- Model: Racing roller coaster
- Lift/launch system: Chain
	Water	Vuur (Fire)
Height	25 m (82 ft)	25 m (82 ft)
Drop	24 m (79 ft)	24 m (79 ft)
Length	810 m (2,657 ft)	810 m (2,657 ft)
Speed	75.0 km/h (47 mph)	75.0 km/h (47 mph)
Duration	2:00	2:00
- Capacity: 1750 riders per hour
- Height restriction: 110 cm (3 ft 7 in)
- Trains: 4 trains with 12 cars. Riders are arranged 2 across in a single row for a total of 24 riders per train.
- Single rider line available
- Joris en de Draak at RCDB; Pictures of Joris en de Draak at RCDB

Joris en de Draak (Dutch: [ˈjoːrɪs ɛn də ˈdraːk]; English: George and the Dragon) is a wooden racing coaster located in the Efteling theme park, inspired by the legend of Saint George and the Dragon.

== History and details ==
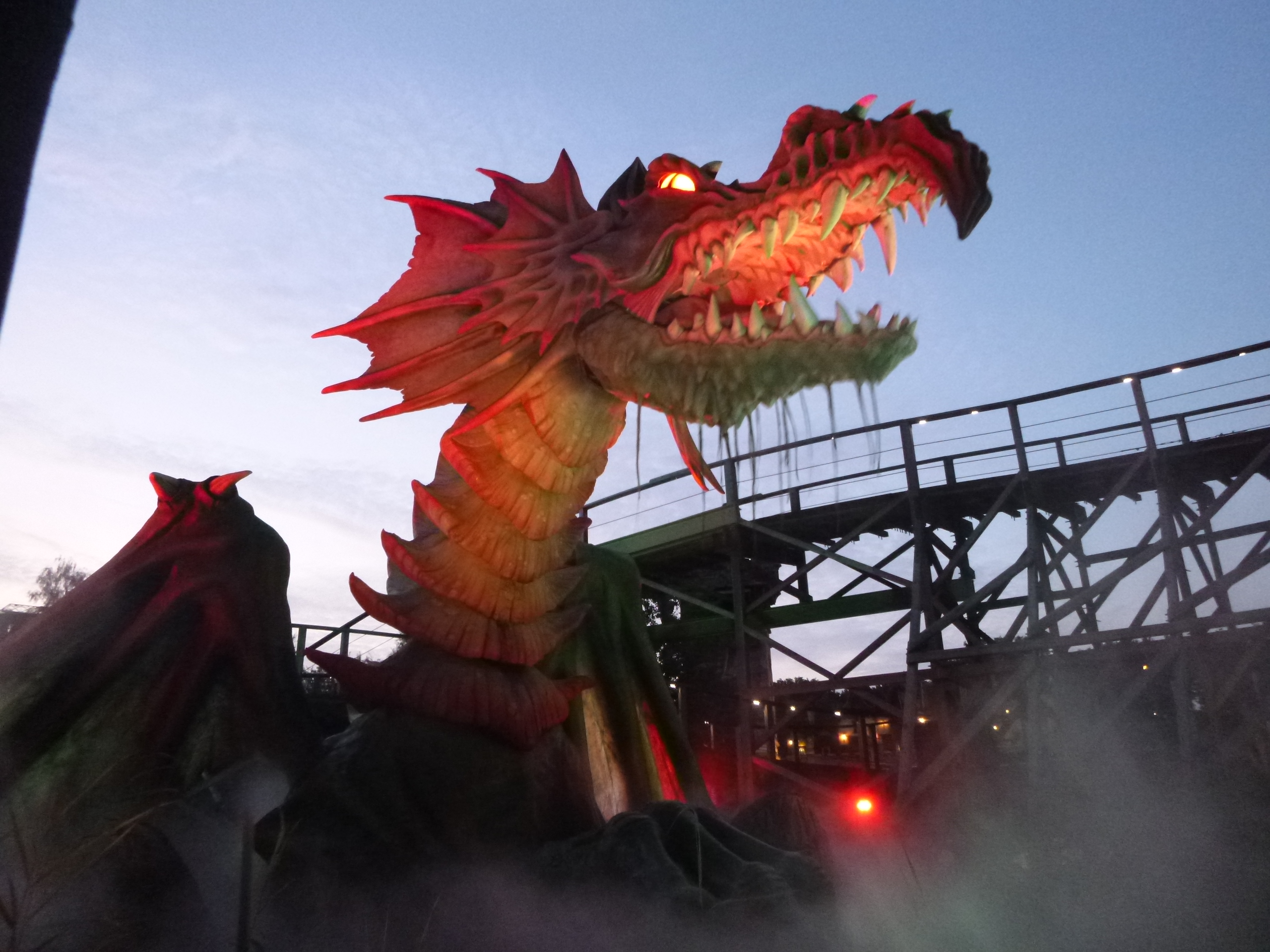
The dragon in the evening.

The dual-tracked roller coaster was built on the site of the former wooden coaster Pegasus, which was demolished in 2009. It features two tracks, named Water and Fire. The ride operates with Millennium Flyer trains, each consisting of 12 cars. Riders are seated two across in a single row, accommodating 24 passengers per train. To facilitate maintenance, only four trains are used at any given time, allowing the coaster to achieve a total capacity of 1,750 riders per hour.

The ride's immersive theming, including a 12-metre-high (39 ft) fire-breathing animatronic dragon, was designed by P&P Projects.

== Awards ==
Joris en de Draak was ranked in the Amusement Today's Golden Ticket Awards for best new ride of 2010 with 4% of the vote, to come in fifth place.

Golden Ticket Awards: Best New Ride for 2010
Ranking	5

Golden Ticket Awards: Top wood Roller Coasters
Year									1998	1999
Ranking									–	–
Year	2000	2001	2002	2003	2004	2005	2006	2007	2008	2009
Ranking	–	–	–	–	–	–	–	–	–	–
Year	2010	2011	2012	2013	2014	2015	2016	2017	2018	2019
Ranking	–	–	–	–	–	–	–	–	–	–
Year	2020	2021	2022	2023	2024	2025	2026			
Ranking	N/A	–	50	–	15	18	29			
