= Dinn Corporation =

Roller coaster design and manufacture company

- Type: Private
- Industry: Roller coaster construction
- Founded: 1983
- Founder: Charles Dinn
- Defunct: 1991
- Fate: Closed
- Headquarters: West Chester Township, Butler County, Ohio, United States
- Key people: Charles Dinn, Denise Dinn Larrick, Randy Larrick, Jeff Dinn

Dinn Corporation was a roller coaster designing and manufacturing company established in West Chester, Ohio, in 1983 by Charles Dinn. The company is noted for moving and rebuilding several existing wooden coasters and building ten new wooden roller coasters in the United States.

== History ==
Charles Dinn served as Kings Island's Director of Construction, Maintenance and Engineering, where he oversaw the design and building of The Beast with a team including Al Collins, Jim Nickell, William Reed and Curtis D. Summers. In November 1983, Dinn left Kings Island and opened his own corporation in West Chester, Ohio. The corporation relocated three older wooden roller coasters from parks that had been closed to new parks. One of the firm's first projects was rebuilding the San Antonio Playland Park Rocket as the Phoenix at Knoebels Amusement Resort. In 1985 Dinn contacted Curtis D. Summers, Inc., an engineering firm in Loveland, Ohio, to provide the design for the restoration of the helix of Paragon Park's Giant Coaster which his company was moving to Wild World in Largo, Maryland. That was the start of a relationship that lasted until 1991. In 1987 the two started building new coasters, with Wolverine Wildcat and Raging Wolf Bobs both opening in 1988.

In 1991, Dinn closed the Dinn Corporation after a dispute that occurred during the construction of Pegasus at Efteling. This was despite a possible project in the works for Kings Island to open in 1992. However, his daughter Denise Dinn Larrick formed the now-defunct company Custom Coasters International, with many of the key personnel from the Dinn Corp.

On July 6, 2021, Dinn died at the age of 88 in Clermont, Florida.

== List of roller coasters ==
Dinn Corporation built 11 roller coasters around the world and assisted with at least 3 known restoration.

=== Relocated/rebuilt coasters ===
Name	Park	Country	Opened	Status	Ref
Wildcat	Lake Compounce	United States	1927	Operating	
Phoenix; Formerly Rocket	Knoebels Amusement Park; Playland Park	United States	1985; 1948 to 1980	Operating	
Wild One; Formerly Giant Coaster	Six Flags America; Paragon Park	United States	1986; 1917 to 1985	Closed 2025	

=== New coasters ===
Name	Park	Country	Opened	Status	Ref
Wolverine Wildcat	Michigan's Adventure	United States	1988	Operating	
Raging Wolf Bobs	Geauga Lake	United States	1988	Removed	
Timber Wolf	Worlds of Fun	United States	1989	Operating	
Hercules	Dorney Park	United States	1989	Removed	
Georgia Cyclone	Six Flags Over Georgia	United States	1990	Converted; Now known as Twisted Cyclone	
Texas Giant	Six Flags Over Texas	United States	1990	Converted; Now known as New Texas Giant	
Predator	Six Flags Darien Lake	United States	1990	Operating	
Woodland Run; Formerly Thunder Run	Kentucky Kingdom	United States	1990	Operating	
Psyclone	Six Flags Magic Mountain	United States	1991	Removed	
Mean Streak	Cedar Point	United States	1991	Converted; Now known as Steel Vengeance	
Pegasus	Efteling	Netherlands	1991	Removed	

== Water projects ==
The Dinn Corporation served as project managers on the following ride installations:

- Raging Rapids, Kennywood
- The Grand Rapids, Boardwalk and Baseball
- Zoom Flume, Lake Compounce
- Paradise Island, Wild World
