= Michigan's Adventure =

Amusement park in Muskegon, Michigan

- Previously known as Deer Park (1956–1971); Deer Park Funland (1972–1987)

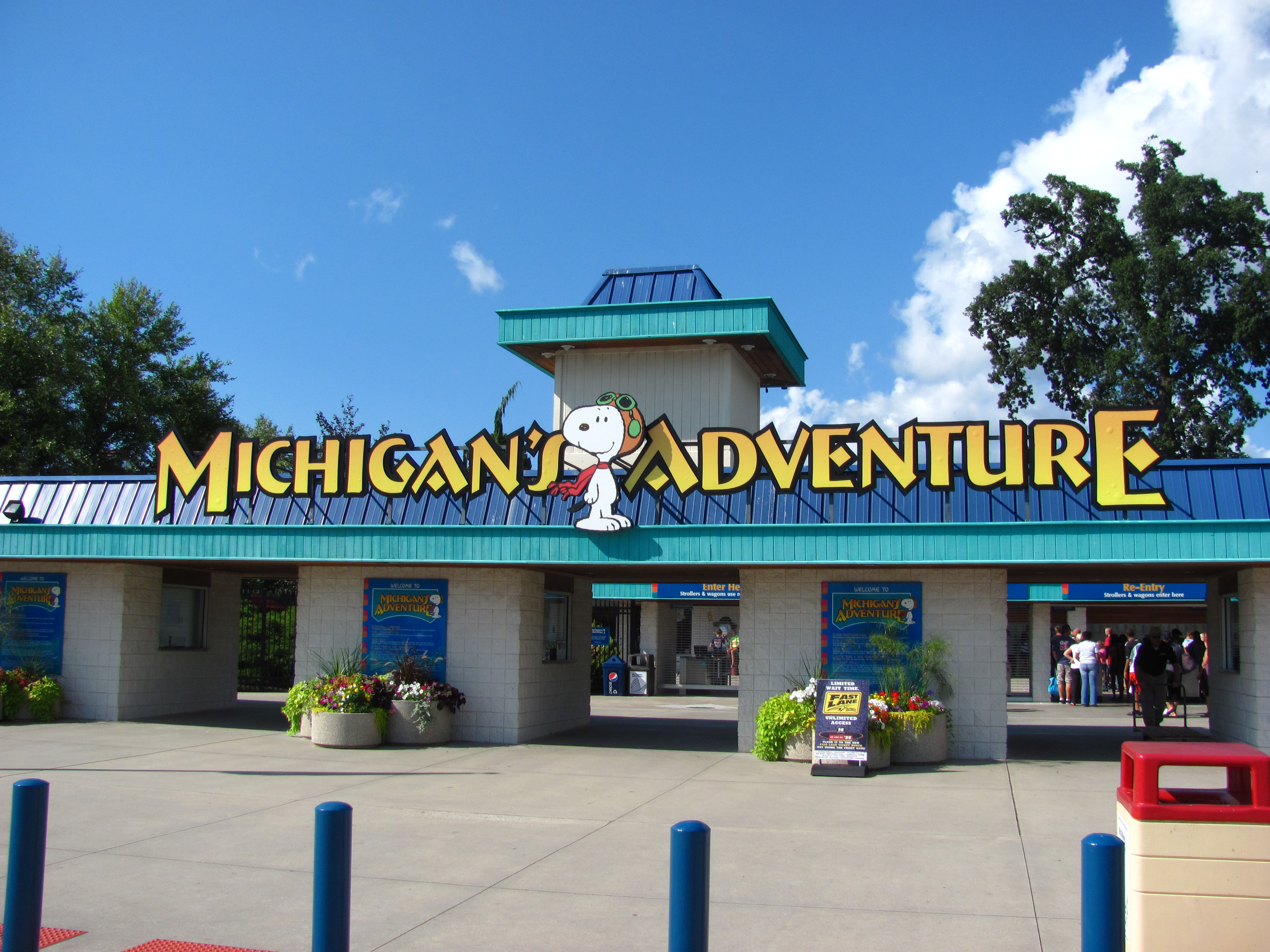
- Interactive map of Michigan's Adventure
- Location: Muskegon County, Michigan, United States
- Coordinates: 43.34740°N 86.27890°W
- Status: Operating
- Opened: 1956
- Owner: EPR Properties
- Operated by: Enchanted Parks
- General manager: Carson Weingart
- Operating season: Late May through early September
- Attendance: 1,000,000 in 2011
- Area: Approx. 250 acres

Attractions
- Total: 37
- Roller coasters: 7
- Water rides: 4
- Website: miadventure.enchantedparks.com

Michigan's Adventure is a 250-acre (100 ha) amusement park in Muskegon County, Michigan, United States. It is owned by EPR Properties and operated by Enchanted Parks. The park has over 60 rides, slides and attractions, making it the largest amusement park in the state.

The park is headlined by seven roller coasters, including Shivering Timbers, Wolverine Wildcat, Corkscrew, and Thunderhawk. Also included on the park's property is a water park, WildWater Adventure.

== History ==
=== Founding and first decades ===
The park was founded as Deer Park in 1956 by L. R. Beardsley, E. S. Gillam, Hardin Dey and Martin Kasichke. The park originally featured a petting zoo with deer, llamas, monkeys, chickens, and ducks, as well as a children's area called Storybook Lane. The first ride was built in 1958, an Allan Herschell Company 16 in (406 mm) gauge miniature train called Deer Park Special.

In 1968, Roger Jourden purchased the park from then-owner Benny Bensinger for $115,000. After installing several attractions, the park was renamed Deer Park Funland in 1972. That same year, he added the first three flat rides: a Tilt-A-Whirl, a carousel, and a Ferris wheel. A Scrambler opened in 1975. In 1976, to celebrate the park's 20th anniversary, a Spider ride, a car ride, and two children's rides were introduced.

The park's first roller coaster, Corkscrew, opened in 1979, having been built by Arrow Development. Another ride built by the company, which had since been renamed Arrow Huss, was introduced in 1983: Logger's Run, a log flume. A Chance Rides swinging ship ride opened in 1987, along with a new C. P. Huntington miniature train. 1987 also marked the final year for Spider, which was subsequently sold to Michael Jackson for his Neverland Ranch complex in Santa Barbara, California.

=== Transition to Michigan's Adventure ===
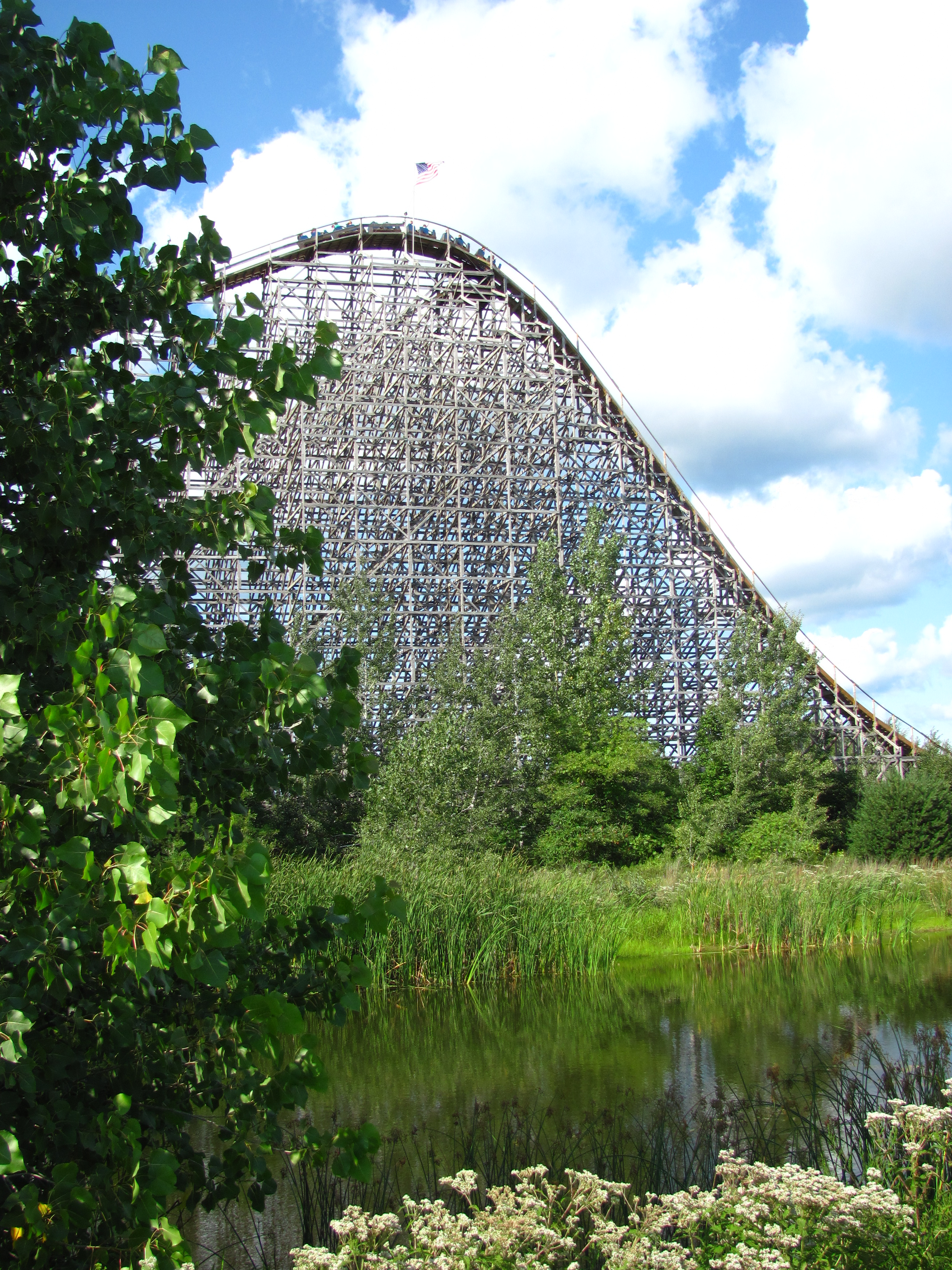
Shivering Timbers' lift hill and initial drop in 2012

The 1988 season marked a notable transition for the park with the introduction of a new general manager, the daughter of the park's owner. This season also saw the park's name changed to Michigan's Adventure. The largest change within the park in 1988 was the introduction of the Wolverine Wildcat roller coaster, the first coaster manufactured by Dinn Corporation. The park also debuted a Matterhorn ride called Thunderbolt, two live shows, and a new entrance.

In 1989, Giant Gondola Wheel replaced the park's original Ferris wheel, and a Falling Star and a Trabant were installed as well. The park introduced a water park, WildWater Adventure, in 1990. WildWater Adventure originally featured eight water slides, a wave pool, a children's water play area, and a lazy river.

Over the next few years, the park introduced several rides, such as the replacement of the park's original carousel with Grand Carousel in 1991, and the addition of Flying Trapeze in 1992. Mammoth River made its debut in WildWater Adventure in 1993, and the park's third coaster, a small wooden coaster named Zach's Zoomer, opened in 1994, replacing the C.P. Huntington miniature train (though a new train would be installed near Wolverine Wildcat). Adventure Falls, a shoot the chute water ride, opened in 1995. 1996 saw the introduction of Chaos and a new Tilt-A-Whirl.

WildWater Adventure was expanded with a "Phase Two" in 1997, including two more wave pools, two new children's water play areas, a second large raft slide, and three more tube slides. Also in 1997, a miniature golf course, Rocky Point Mini-Golf, was introduced.

A third wooden roller coaster, Shivering Timbers, opened in 1998, and received large amounts of praise from roller coaster enthusiasts and industry publications. Early into the 1998 season, however, the late May 1998 tornado outbreak and derecho damaged the Mutley's Putt Putts ride as well as a small children's ride named Drummer Boy, alongside uprooting many trees in the park. Muttley's Putt Putts was removed, but Drummer Boy was restored and returned to operation.

The park put a five-year expansion plan into motion in 1999 with the introduction of a new entrance on the site formerly occupied by Mutley's Putt Putts, a new ticketing system, and three new rides. In June of 1999, the first of these rides to open was Big Dipper, the park's fifth roller coaster. Timbers Fest, a roller coaster enthusiast event with early and late exclusive ride time, was also held for the first time in 1999. Also in 1999, the park's sixth roller coaster, Mad Mouse, as well as a children's drop tower ride named Frog Hopper, opened on the site where the previous park entrance stood. Scrambler was also relocated within the park to make room for future additions.

In 1999, Michigan's Adventure began planning to build a 210 foot (64 m) tall steel roller coaster. The coaster was projected to cost around $7,000,000, but it ultimately did not come to fruition.

=== Cedar Fair, Six Flags, and Enchanted Parks era ===
In 2001, Cedar Fair purchased Michigan's Adventure for $28,000,000. Larry MacKenzie replaced Camille Jourden-Mark as general manager to guide the park through the transition, but he would leave for Valleyfair at the end of the year, bringing Jourden-Mark back as general manager.

In 2002, the park introduced $5,000,000 worth of new rides, attractions, and improvements. Eight new attractions were installed, including the park's tallest ride, RipCord, as well as the introduction of Peanuts characters in themed areas. 2004 saw the addition of Swan Boats, relocated from Cedar Point in Sandusky, Ohio, where they were removed to make way for Maverick. In 2005, the park introduced a new ProSlide Tornado water slide named Funnel of Fear. In 2006, for the park's 50th anniversary, a new white water rafting ride called Grand Rapids opened. The renovation also included a new restaurant and train station.

In 2008, Michigan's Adventure opened a Suspended Looping Coaster, Thunderhawk, which had been relocated from another Cedar Fair park, Geauga Lake in Aurora, Ohio, after the latter's 2007 closure. In 2010, Bumper Boats were added, having previously operating at Valleyfair. In 2011, Michigan's Adventure introduced a water play area in WildWater Adventure known as Beach Party, which featured an artificial geyser, blasting water 90 feet (27 m) into the air, as well as 150 different interactive water-related features. Following the 2011 season, Falling Star was removed from the park.

On December 17, 2012, Michigan's Adventure announced their intent to build a Flying Scooters ride named Lakeside Gliders, which opened in 2013. In addition, the park opened the Lakeside Beer Garden.

On August 11, 2019, the Be-Bop Blvd car ride closed permanently. Four days later, the park announced a Camp Snoopy children's area would be built for 2020, and would contain five new rides, including a family coaster. This coaster was later revealed to simply be a relocation of the park's Big Dipper coaster, which was renamed Woodstock Express. These plans were delayed due to the COVID-19 pandemic. In 2020, WildWater Adventure opened in July under restrictions, but the amusement park side was unable to operate for the 2020 season.

On October 18, 2022, Michigan's Adventure announced the debut of the park's first Halloween event, Tricks and Treats Fall Fest, which would extend the operating season into September and October for the first time in the park's history. On July 1, 2024, a merger between Michigan's Adventure owner Cedar Fair and fellow amusement park chain Six Flags was completed, creating Six Flags Entertainment Corporation.

On July 21, 2025, it was announced that Tricks and Treats Fall Fest would be discontinued.

On January 10, 2026, a trademark was filed for Enchanted Parks Michigan Adventure. On March 5, 2026, Six Flags announced that Michigan's Adventure was one of seven parks being sold to EPR Properties. The sale closed on April 6, 2026. EPR Properties hired Enchanted Parks to operate Michigan's Adventure.

== Rides and attractions ==
=== Current rides and attractions ===
Intensity rating (out of 5)
1 (low) 2 (mild) 3 (moderate) 4 (high) 5 (aggressive)

==== Roller coasters ====
Ride	Picture	Opened	Manufacturer	Description	Height requirement	Thrill level
Corkscrew		1979	Arrow Dynamics	A steel roller coaster. It tops out at a height of 70 feet (21 m), reaches a top speed of 45 miles per hour (72 km/h), and has two corkscrew inversions. It was the first roller coaster built at the park, and is one of the oldest Arrow Development Corkscrew coasters still in existence.	Over 48"	5
Mad Mouse		1999	Arrow Dynamics	A steel wild mouse roller coaster. The coaster consists of sharp turns and sudden drops, and stands 68 feet (21 m) tall.	Over 48" or 42" with adult	4
Shivering Timbers		1998	Custom Coasters International	A hybrid wooden roller coaster with trains by Philadelphia Toboggan Coasters. It stands 122 feet (37 m) in the air and reaches top speeds of 57 miles per hour (92 km/h).	Over 48"	5
Thunderhawk		2008	Vekoma	A steel inverted roller coaster of the Suspended Looping Coaster model. The ride is 105 feet (32 m) tall, has a drop of 86 feet (26 m), and features five inversions, as well as top speeds of 50 miles per hour (80 km/h). The coaster previously operated at Geauga Lake prior to that park's closure.	Over 52" and below 78"	5
Wolverine Wildcat		1988	Dinn Corporation	A hybrid wooden roller coaster. The ride is 85 feet (26 m) tall and reaches top speeds of 55 miles per hour (89 km/h). The layout was inspired by Phoenix at Knoebels Amusement Resort.	Over 48"	5
Woodstock Express Previously Big Dipper (1999– 2020)		1999	Chance Rides	A steel children's roller coaster of the Big Dipper model. The ride stands about 16 feet (4.9 m) tall. The coaster was originally known as Big Dipper, until it was relocated to the Camp Snoopy section of the park in 2021, at which point it was renamed to its current name.	Over 42" or 36" with adult	3
Zach's Zoomer		1994	Custom Coasters International	A wooden roller coaster. It was named after the park owner's grandson. Zach's Zoomer has been designated an ACE Coaster Classic by American Coaster Enthusiasts for maintaining its classic standard of operations. The trains for the ride were built by Philadelphia Toboggan Coasters.	Over 46" or 40" with adult	4

==== Upcharge rides and attractions ====
Ride	Opened	Type	Description	Height requirement	Thrill level
Ripcord	2002	Skycoaster	Pulls riders 183 feet (56 m) in the air before dropping them in a pendulum motion	Over 42"	5
Rocky Point Mini-Golf	1997	Miniature golf course	N/A	None	N/A

==== Family rides ====
Ride	Opened	Manufacturer	Type	Height requirement	Thrill level
Carousel	1991	Unknown	Carousel	Over 42" or with adult, hand-held infants allowed	1
Dodgem	2002	Unknown	Bumper cars	Over 48" or 42" with adult	4
Drummer Boy	1995	Unknown	Spinning ride	Over 36" or with adult	2
Flying Trapeze	1992	Unknown	Swing ride	Over 42"	3
Funland Farms	Unknown	N/A	Farm animal zoo	None	N/A
Giant Gondola Wheel	1989	Unknown	Ferris wheel	Over 48" or with adult	2
Lakeside Gliders	2013	Larson International	Flying Scooters	Over 44" or 36" with adult	3
Scrambler	1975	Eli Bridge Company	Scrambler	Over 48" or 36" with adult	3
Sea Dragon	1987	Chance Rides	Swinging ship	Over 48" or with adult	3
Swan Boats	2004	Unknown	Paddleboats	Over 54" or with adult	2
Thunderbolt	1988	Unknown	Matterhorn	Over 46" or 42" with adult	3
Tilt-A-Whirl	1996	Sellner Manufacturing	Tilt-A-Whirl	Over 46" or with adult	3
Timbertown Railway	2002	Unknown	Miniature train	Over 42" or with adult	1
Trabant	1989	Chance Rides	Trabant	Over 42" or with adult	3

==== Children's rides and attractions ====
Ride	Opened	Manufacturer	Type	Height requirement	Thrill level
Airplanes	1983	Unknown	Miniature spinning plane ride	Between 36" and 54"	2
Elephants	1983	Unknown	Miniature spinning elephant ride	Between 36" and 54"	2
Frog Hopper	1999	S&S Worldwide	Miniature drop tower	Over 36"	2
Kiddie Cars	1976	Unknown	Miniature spinning car ride	Under 54"	1
Motorcycles	1976	Unknown	Miniature spinning motorcycle ride	Under 54"	1
Speed Splashers	2000	Unknown	Miniature spinning boat ride	None	1
Winky the Whale	1995	Unknown	Miniature spinning whale ride	Over 36" or with adult	1

===== Camp Snoopy =====
Ride	Opened	Manufacturer	Type	Height requirement	Thrill level
Beagle Scout Acres	2021	Unknown	Playground	None	N/A
Beagle Scout Lookout	2021	Zamperla	Balloon Race	Over 42" or with adult	2
Camp Bus	2021	Zamperla	Crazy Bus	Over 36" or with adult	2
PEANUTS™ Trailblazers	2021	Zamperla	Speedway	Over 36" or with adult	2
Pigpen's Mud Buggies	2021	Zamperla	Jump Around	Over 36" or with adult	2

==== Water rides ====
Ride	Opened	Manufacturer	Type	Height requirement	Thrill level
Adventure Falls	1995	Unknown	Shoot the chute	Over 46"	4
Grand Rapids	2006	Unknown	River rapids ride	Over 48" or 42" with adult	4
Logger's Run	1983	Arrow Huss	Log flume	Over 46" or 36" with adult	4

==== WildWater Adventure water park ====
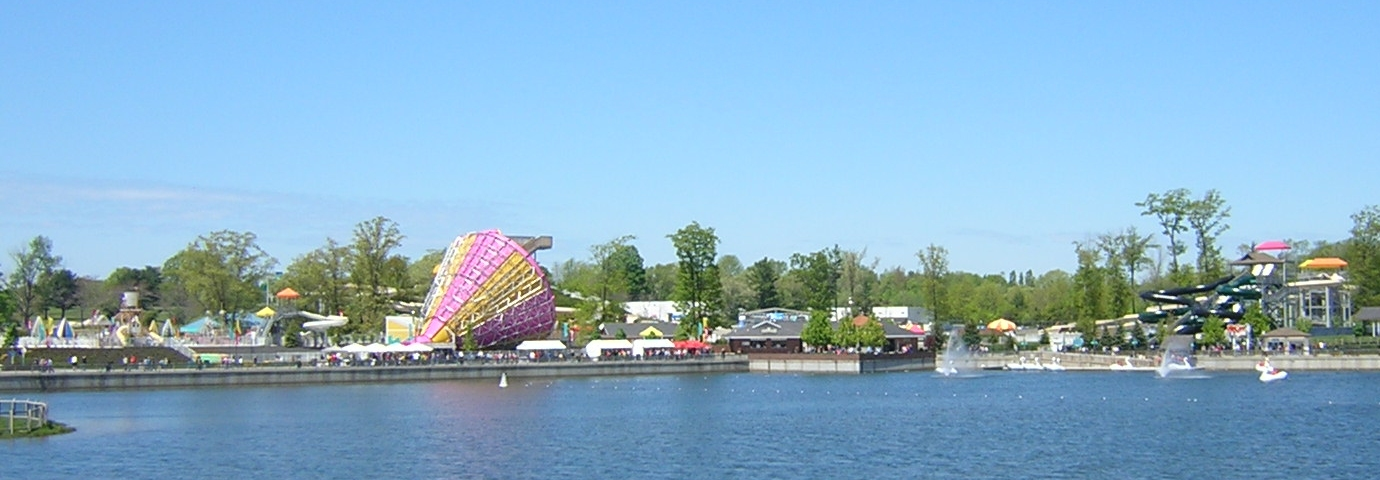
WildWater Adventure in 2006

WildWater Adventure, opened in 1990, is a water park with 16 water slides, 3 wave pools, 3 children's water play areas, and a lazy river. After the addition of the WildWater Adventure, Michigan's Adventure's slogan became "2 parks for the price of 1", since regular gate admission allows full day usage of both the amusement and the water park.

=== Former rides and attractions ===
Ride	Opened	Closed	Manufacturer	Type
Be-Bop Blvd	2002	2019	Unknown	Car ride
Chaos	1996	2001	Chance Rides	Chaos
Falling Star	1989	2011	Chance Rides	Falling Star
Mini Enterprise	1983	2019	Zamperla	Mini Enterprise
Mutley's Putt Putts	1976	1998	Gould Manufacturing	Car ride
Spider	1976	1987	Eyerly Aircraft Company	Spider

== Fast Lane queuing ==
Fast Lane is Michigan's Adventure's virtual queue system. For $45, visitors get a wristband that enables them to access the front of the line without queuing on 14 of the most popular attractions.

== Festivals ==
- The park formerly hosted Timbers Fest, a festival targeted at roller coaster enthusiasts, featuring early admission and exclusive ride time. Timbers Fest originally ran from 1999 to 2009. Timbers Fest returned for a single year on May 28, 2023 to celebrate the 25th anniversary of Shivering Timbers.
- Tricks and Treats Fall Fest, a family-oriented Halloween event, was held in 2023 and 2024.

== Incidents ==
- On June 30, 2000, a 38-year-old woman riding Zach's Zoomer fell out while attempting to photograph her relatives riding behind her, striking a wooden support beam. Paramedics found the woman unconscious, and she was transported to Hackley Hospital in critical condition. She suffered rib fractures and other internal injuries.
- On July 27, 2001, the rotating, wheel-shaped portion of the Chaos ride collapsed with 33 passengers aboard, stranding them for several hours. 31 were taken to local area hospitals, and most were released by the following afternoon. An investigation found that several bolts on the ride had been loose, and subsequently bent and broke during the ride's operation.
- On July 11, 2014, chlorine gas was released into an area of the WildWater Adventure water park. 27 park visitors were treated and hosed off at the park, while 28 patients were taken to Mercy Health hospitals. All patients were released without serious injury.
- On May 29, 2017, Thunderhawk's emergency safety mechanism shut down the ride for 90 minutes after the lift motor malfunctioned. One train was in the station, while another was traversing the ride's course. No one was injured.
