= Wolverine Wildcat =

Roller coaster at Michigan's Adventure

- The ride in 2002

Michigan's Adventure
- Location: Michigan's Adventure
- Park section: Timbertown
- Coordinates: 43°20′37″N 86°16′39″W
- Status: Operating
- Opening date: May 18, 1988

General statistics
- Type: Wood
- Manufacturer: Dinn Corporation
- Designer: Curtis D. Summers
- Track layout: Double out-and-back
- Lift/launch system: Chain lift hill
- Height: 85 ft (26 m)
- Drop: 78 ft (24 m)
- Length: 3,000 ft (910 m)
- Speed: 55 mph (89 km/h)
- Inversions: 0
- Duration: 2:00
- Height restriction: 48 in (122 cm)
- Trains: Single train with 4 cars; riders arranged 2 across in 3 rows for a total of 24 riders per train
- Fast Lane available
- Wolverine Wildcat at RCDB

Wolverine Wildcat is a wooden roller coaster at Michigan's Adventure in Muskegon, Michigan. The ride opened in 1988 and was the first roller coaster built by Dinn Corporation.

The ride has a double out-and-back layout that is loosely inspired by the defunct Wildcat at Coney Island in Cincinnati, Ohio, as well as Phoenix at Knoebels Amusement Resort in Elysburg, Pennsylvania. It operates with a manual braking system.

The ride receives support from Martin & Vleminckx in reconstruction and retracking projects to smooth the ride's track for a better ride experience.
