= Zach's Zoomer =

Roller coaster at Michigan's Adventure

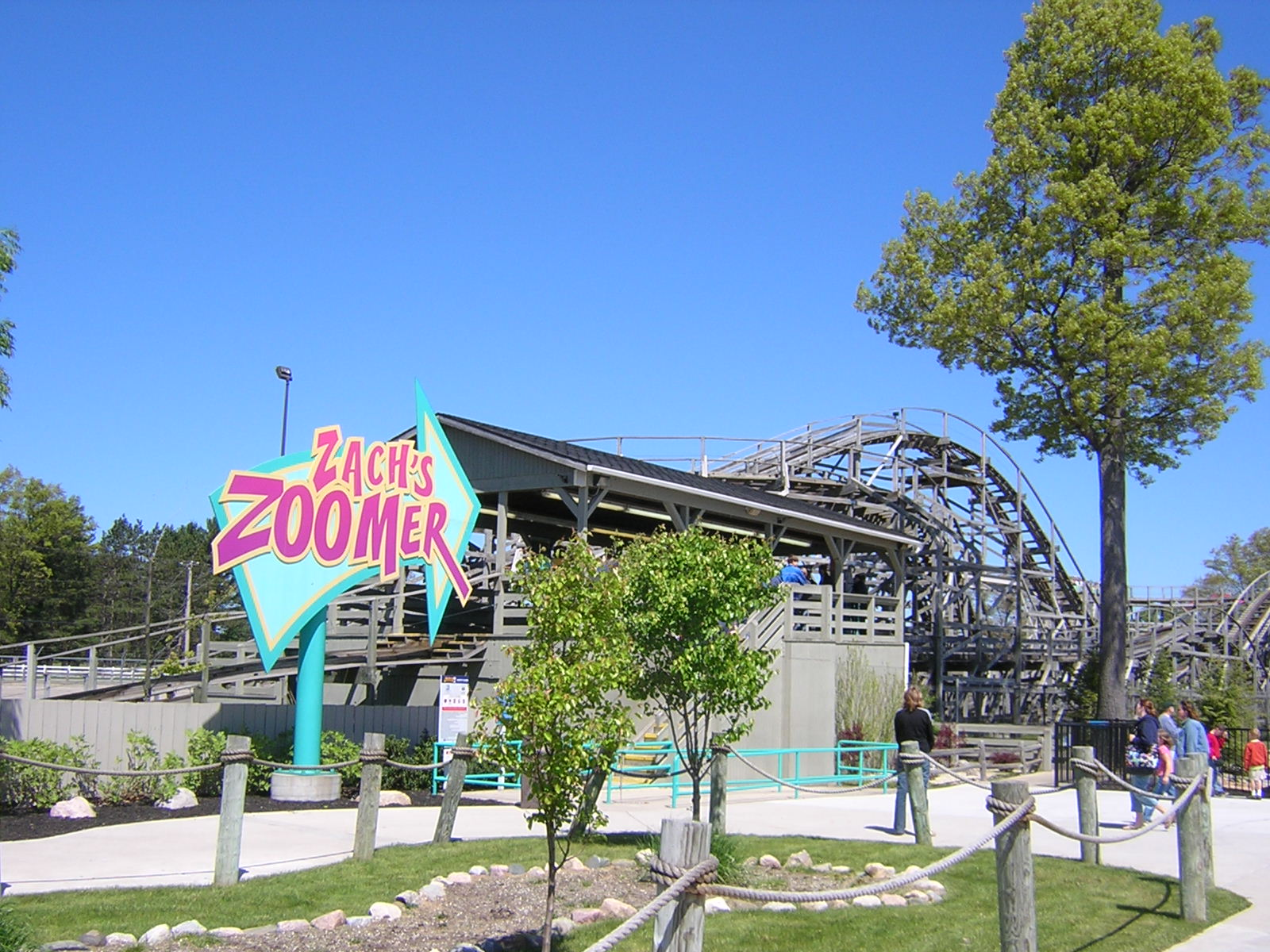
- The ride in 2006

Michigan's Adventure
- Location: Michigan's Adventure
- Coordinates: 43.343424°N 86.280932°W
- Status: Operating
- Opening date: July 22, 1994

General statistics
- Type: Wood
- Manufacturer: Custom Coasters International
- Lift/launch system: Chain lift hill
- Height: 41 ft (12 m)
- Length: 1,400 ft (430 m)
- Height restriction: 40 in (102 cm)
- Trains: Single train with 5 cars; riders arranged 2 across in 2 rows for a total of 20 riders per train
- Fast Lane available
- Zach's Zoomer at RCDB

Zach's Zoomer is a wooden roller coaster at Michigan's Adventure in Muskegon, Michigan. The ride was manufactured by Custom Coasters International and was designed by John C. Allen of Philadelphia Toboggan Coasters, the latter of whom also built the ride's train.

The ride opened in 1994, and is intended for children and families. It was named after former park owner Roger Jourden's grandson and former general manager Camille Jourden-Mark's son, Zach Mark. The ride has been designated an ACE Coaster Classic by American Coaster Enthusiasts for maintaining its classic standards of operation.

Zach's Zoomer operates with a manual braking system.

== Incident ==
On June 30, 2000, a 38-year-old woman riding Zach's Zoomer fell out while attempting to photograph her relatives riding behind her, striking a wooden support beam. Paramedics found the woman unconscious, and she was transported to Hackley Hospital in critical condition. She suffered rib fractures and other internal injuries.
