= Riverview Park (Chicago) =

Former amusement park in Chicago, Illinois

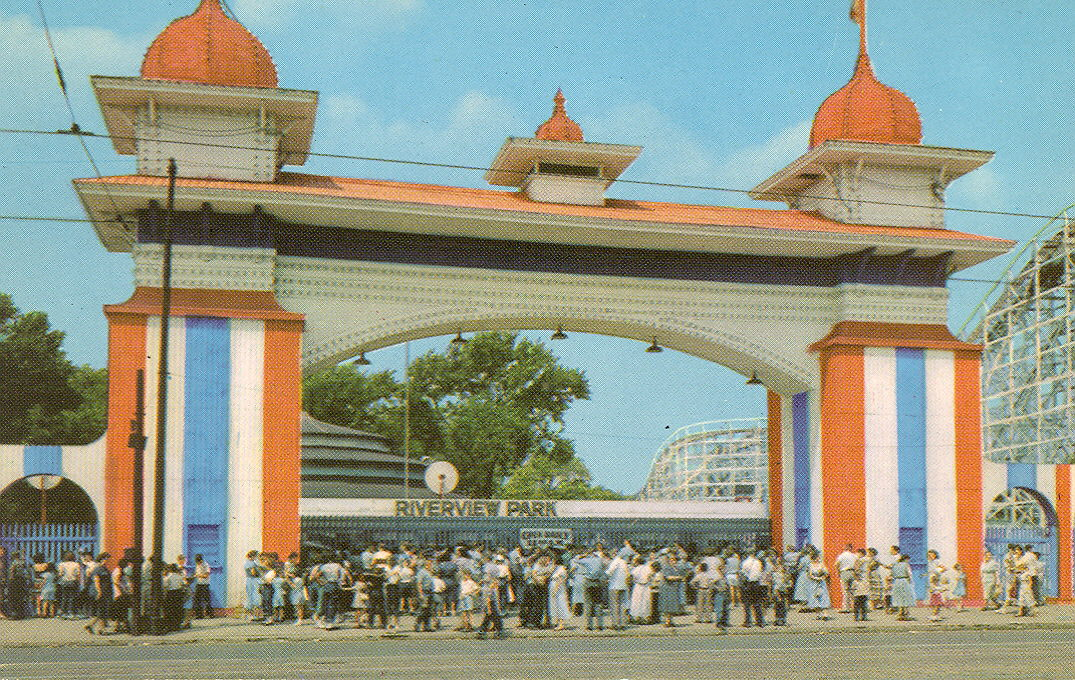
- Main entrance to Riverview Park
- Interactive map of Riverview Park
- Location: 3300 North Western Avenue, Chicago, Illinois
- Coordinates: 41°56′33″N 87°41′28″W
- Status: Defunct
- Opened: July 2, 1904
- Closed: October 3, 1967; 58 years ago
- Slogan: "Laugh your troubles away!"; "Chicago's famous amusement park!"

Riverview Park was an amusement park in Chicago, Illinois which operated from 1904 to 1967. It was located on 74 acres (30 hectares) of land in the Roscoe Village neighborhood of Chicago's North Center community area.

== History ==
Riverview Park was established in 1904 by William Schmidt, on the grounds of his private skeet shooting range. The Schmidt family owned and operated the park for its entire lifetime.

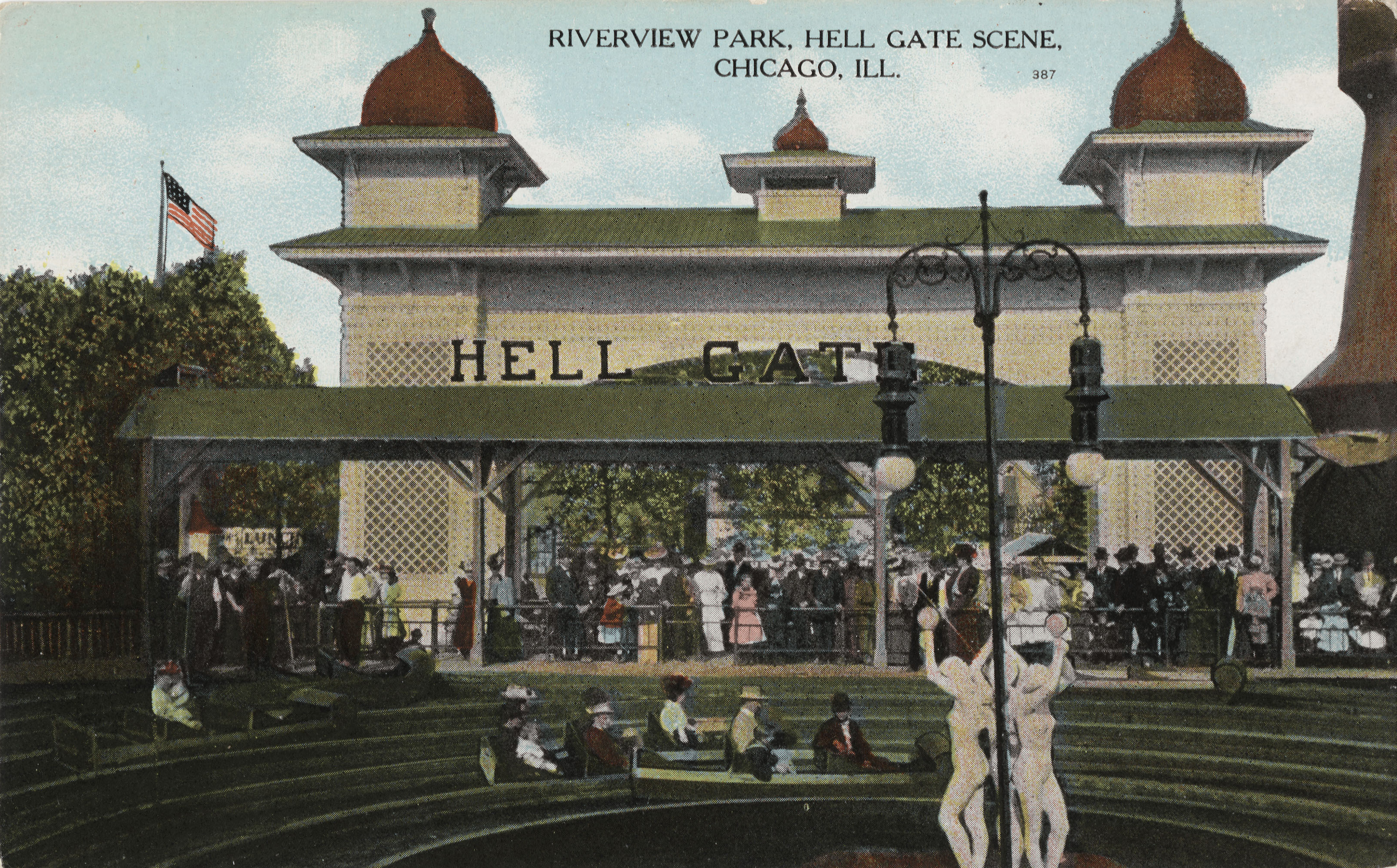
Hell Gate circa 1907-1914

Bill Haywood, leader of Industrial Workers of the World, once spoke at the park to a crowd of almost 80,000 people.

Enduring racially motivated myths described the park's "seedy" atmosphere in the 1950s and 1960s as it became more integrated between races. Contemporaneous articles in black publications such as The Chicago Defender described black patrons being subject to latent and overt racism. The most overt was a longstanding dunk tank attraction officially named "African Dip" and later shortened to "Dip", but often referred to by patrons as "Dunk the Nigger". In the 1950s, the NAACP and Chicago newspaper columnist Mike Royko successfully lobbied to shut it down.

According to Victoria Wolcott, author of the 2012 book Race, Riots, and Roller Coasters:

“You see this thing a lot, when African Americans begin going in large numbers [to amusement parks], the parks are increasingly associated with danger and criminality...”

Riverview Park closed in 1967. A Chicago Tribune article from late 1967 blamed violence for the park's closure, though Wolcott said there was little evidence to support this. White flight contributed to Riverview Park's financial decline. The Schmidt family sold the park's land to developers at a cost of over $6.8 million ($65,659,000 in 2025).

The grounds eventually became home to the Riverview Plaza shopping center, the Chicago Police Area 3 Detective Division, DePaul College Prep, dental equipment manufacturer Hu-Friedy Manufacturing, and Richard Clark Park of the Chicago Park District.

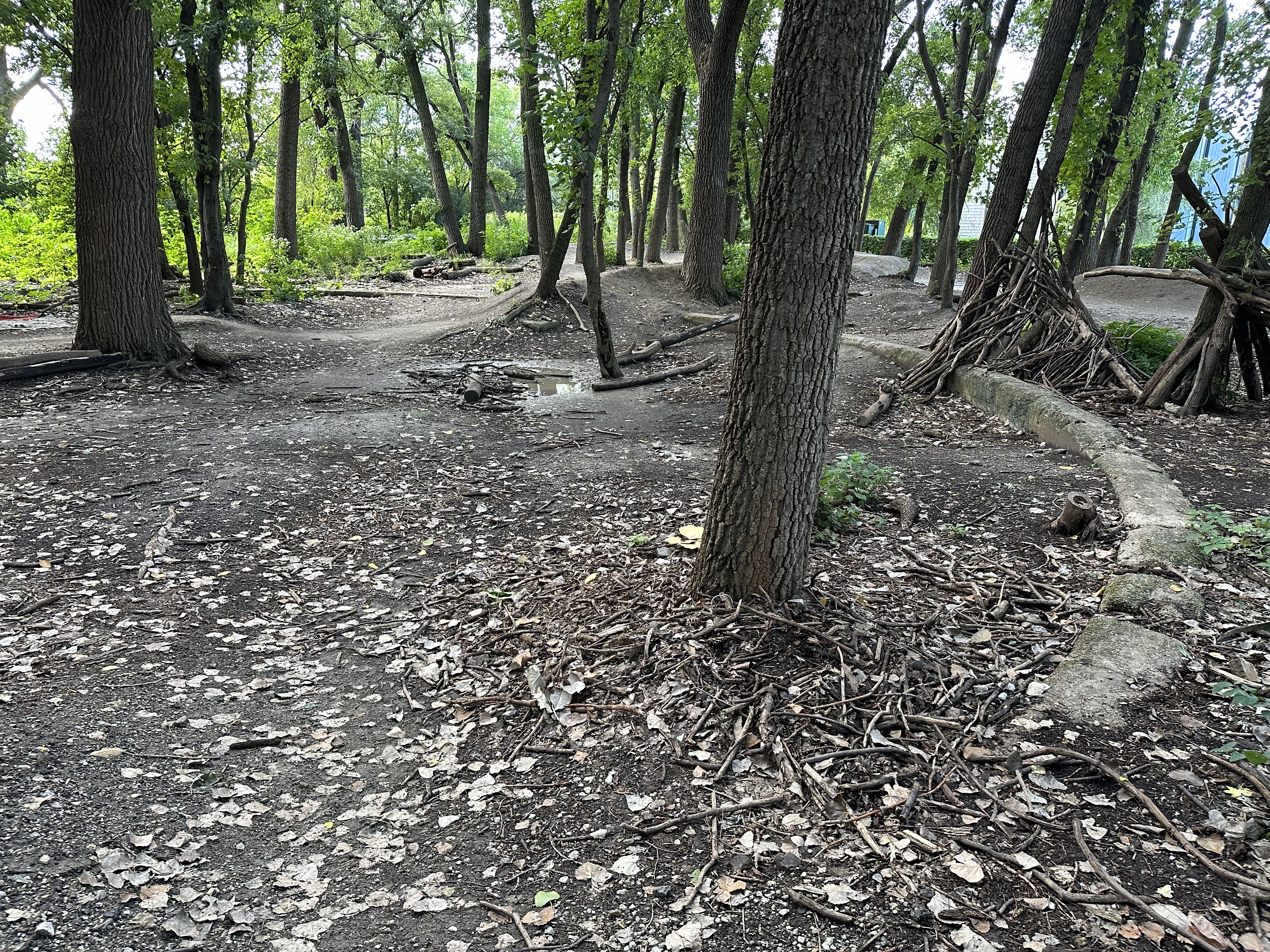
Remnants of concrete foundations used for rides still visible as seen in 2023

Many items from Riverview Park, as well as paintings of the park, were displayed at the Riverview Tavern from 2005 to 2018. The park's carousel, the only ride from the park to be relocated elsewhere, continues to operate at Six Flags Over Georgia today.

== Rides and attractions ==
Name	Year opened	Year closed	Manufacturer and type	Image	Description
Aerial Coaster	1908	1910	Aerial Tramway Construction Company, Steel suspended roller coaster		Formerly known as Pottsdam Railway
Aladdin's Castle	Unknown	1967	Funhouse		
Big Dipper	1920	1967	Harry C. Baker and John A. Miller, Wooden roller coaster		Formerly known as Zephyr and Comet
Blue Streak	1911	1923	Frederick Ingersoll and John A. Miller, Wooden side friction roller coaster		May have also been known as Speedoplane
Bobs	1924	1967	Frank Prior and Frederick Church, Wooden roller coaster		
Boomerang	Unknown	Unknown	Unknown		
Bump 'Em	Unknown	Unknown	Bumper cars		
Calypso	Unknown	Unknown	Unknown		
Cannon Ball	1919	1925	Fred W. Pearce, Benjamin E. Winslow, and John A. Miller; Wooden roller coaster		
Carousel	1908	1967	Philadelphia Toboggan Coasters, Carousel		Featured 70 horses and was one of only three five-abreast carousels known to exist. In 1967, it was purchased by and moved to Six Flags Over Georgia, where it was renamed Riverview Carousel.
Derby Racer	1910	1931	Frederick Ingersoll and John A. Miller, Wooden dual-tracked side friction roller coaster		
Expo Whirl	1910	Unknown			
Ferris Wheel	Unknown	Unknown	Ferris wheel		
Fireball	1923	1967	Belmont Construction Company, Wooden roller coaster		Originally opened as Skyrocket in 1923. Renamed to Blue Streak in 1936. Majorly rebuilt and renovated into Fireball in 1959.
Flying Cars	1954	1966	Car ride		
Flying Scooter	Unknown	Unknown	Bisch-Rocco, Flying Scooters		
Flying Turns	1935	1967	John Norman Bartlett and John A. Miller, Wooden bobsled roller coaster		Originally operated at the 1933 and 1934 World's Fairs
Freak show	1950s	Unknown	Live show		A show that featured Betty Lou Williams (a four-legged woman) and magician Marshall Brodien
Gee Wiz	1912	1963	John A. Miller, Wooden roller coaster		Formerly known as Greyhound
Hades	Unknown	Unknown	Funhouse		
Hell Gate	Unknown	Unknown	Funhouse		
Hot Rods	1955	1967	Race track		
Jack Rabbit	1914	1932	Frederick Ingersoll and John A. Miller, Wooden roller coaster		
Jetstream	1964	1967	Philadelphia Toboggan Coasters and John C. Allen, Wooden roller coaster		
Kiddie Bobs	1926	1934	Frank Prior and Frederick Church, Wooden children's roller coaster		
Krazy Ribbon	1923	Somewhere between 1943 and 1952	Wooden spinning (Virginia Reel) roller coaster		Formerly known as Virginia Reel from 1923 to 1932
Metrodome	1911	Unknown	Unknown		
Miniature steam engine train	Unknown	Unknown	Rideable miniature railway		Coal-fired engine
Pair-O-Chutes	1937	1967	Free-fall parachute ride		Formerly known as Eye-Full
Paratrooper	1960	Unknown	Paratrooper		
Pikes Peak Scenic Railway	1907	1911	"Barry", LaMarcus Adna Thompson, John A. Miller; Wooden roller coaster		
Pippin	1921	1967	Harry C. Baker and John A. Miller, Wooden roller coaster		Formerly known as Flash and Silver Flash
Racetrack	1907	Unknown	Race track		
Rotor	1952	1967	Orton & Spooner, Rotor		
Royal George Scenic Railway	1908	1920	"Barry" and John A. Miller, Wooden roller coaster		
Shoot the Chutes	Unknown	1967	Shoot the chutes		
Space Ride	1963	1967	Sky ride		
Strat-O-Stat	Unknown	Unknown	Unknown		
Tickler	1910	Unknown	Tickler		
Tilt-A-Whirl	Unknown	Unknown	Sellner Manufacturing, Tilt-A-Whirl		
Top	1917	Unknown	Spiral Wheel Operating Corporation, Wooden Circular Gravity Railway roller coaster		
Tunnel of Love	Unknown	1967	Old Mill		Formerly known as Thousand Islands and Mill on the Floss. Renamed to Tunnel of Love in 1950.
Velvet Coaster	1909	1919	Frederick Ingersoll and John A. Miller, Wooden roller coaster		
White Flyer	1904	1920s	LaMarcus Adna Thompson, Wooden roller coaster		
Wild Mouse	1958	1967	B. A. Schiff & Associates, Steel wild mouse roller coaster		
Witching Waves	1910	Unknown	Unknown		

== In popular culture ==
- A line in The Beach Boys' song "Amusement Parks U.S.A." from their 1965 album Summer Days (And Summer Nights!!) referenced the park by name and mentioned its Pair-O-Chutes ride.
- Bally Manufacturing and WNS Industries' headquarters and primary manufacturing facilities were just west of Riverview Park. Fireball, Bally Manufacturing's 1972 pinball machine, was named after Riverview Park's Fireball roller coaster. Their Aladdin's Castle amusement arcade division was named to honor the Aladdin's Castle funhouse. The Aladdin's Castle pinball machine was similarly inspired.
- The park appears in the 1977 novel The Unoriginal Sinner and the Ice Cream God by John R. Powers.
- WMS Industries' 1985 pinball game Comet was named after another coaster at the park, and Screamo (1959) featured various rides from the park. WMS Industries' 1990 amusement park-themed pinball machine FunHouse was also inspired by Riverview Park. The Riverview Carousel is depicted on the machine's backglass.
