= Bobs (roller coaster) =

Former roller coaster at Riverview Park

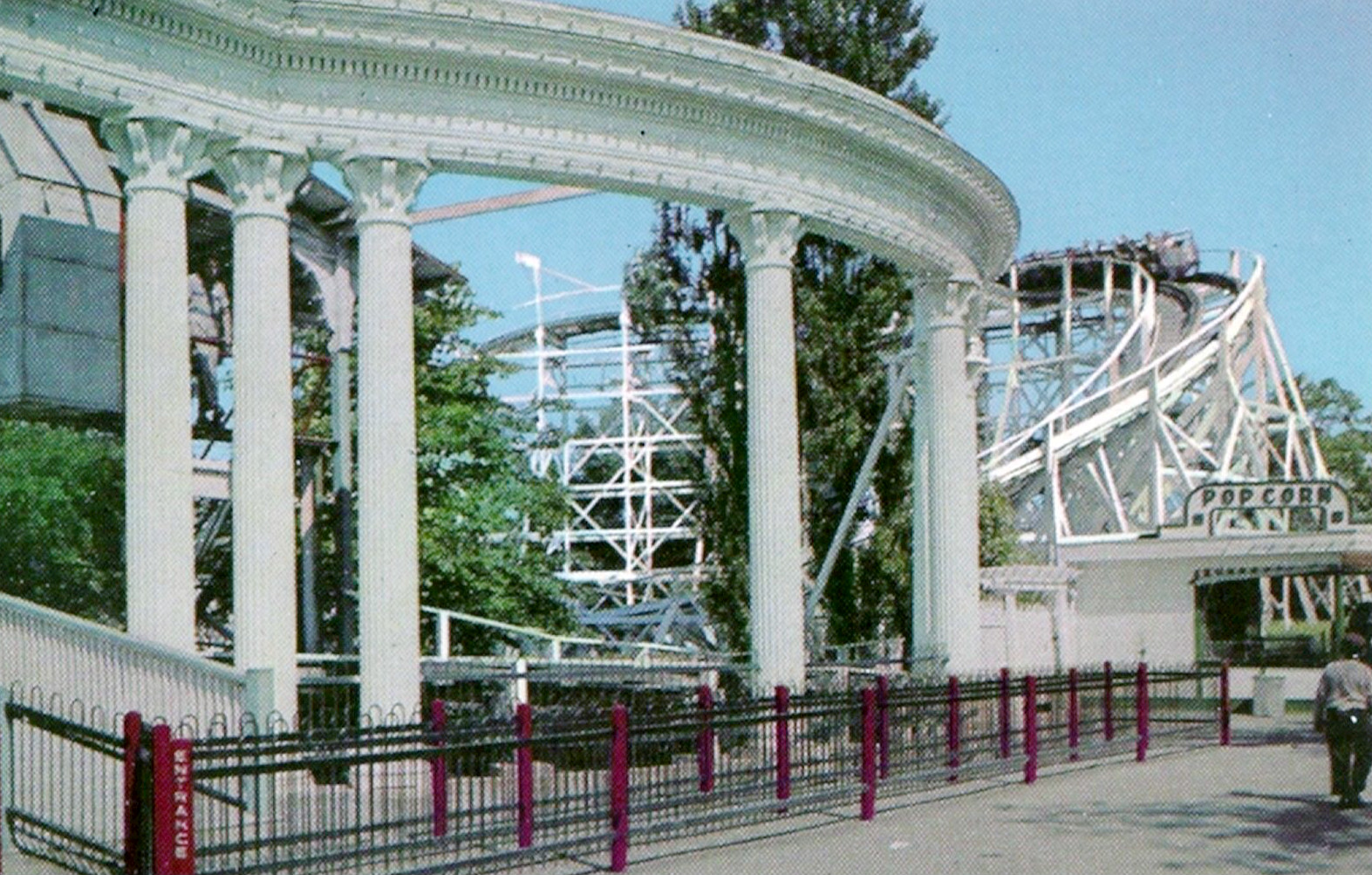
- Bobs as seen in a postcard

Riverview Park
- Location: Riverview Park
- Coordinates: 41.940663°N 87.692439°W
- Status: Removed
- Opening date: 1924
- Closing date: 1967

General statistics
- Type: Wood
- Manufacturer: Prior and Church
- Designer: Fred Church
- Lift/launch system: Chain lift hill
- Height: 64.75 ft (19.74 m)
- Drop: 59.58 ft (18.16 m)
- Length: 3,235 ft (986 m)
- Speed: 50 mph (80 km/h)
- Inversions: 0
- Bobs at RCDB

Bobs was a wooden roller coaster located at Riverview Park in Chicago, Illinois, United States. It was built in 1924, and was demolished with the rest of the park in 1967. Bobs was built by Prior and Church, and designed by Frederick Church. According to professional review of the blueprints, Bobs had a maximum height of 64.75 feet (19.74 m), a drop of 59.58 feet (18.16 m), and reached speeds of up to 50 miles per hour (80 km/h).

A ride inspired by Bobs was installed in 1988 at the now-defunct Geauga Lake amusement park in Aurora, Ohio, called Raging Wolf Bobs. The ride operated until June 16, 2007, when a derailment accident occurred on the ride, injuring several riders and resulting in the ride's closure for the rest of the 2007 season. The amusement park side of Geauga Lake would close for good in 2007, and Raging Wolf Bobs would stand out of operation until 2014, when it was finally demolished.
