= Corkscrew (Michigan's Adventure) =

Roller coaster at Michigan's Adventure

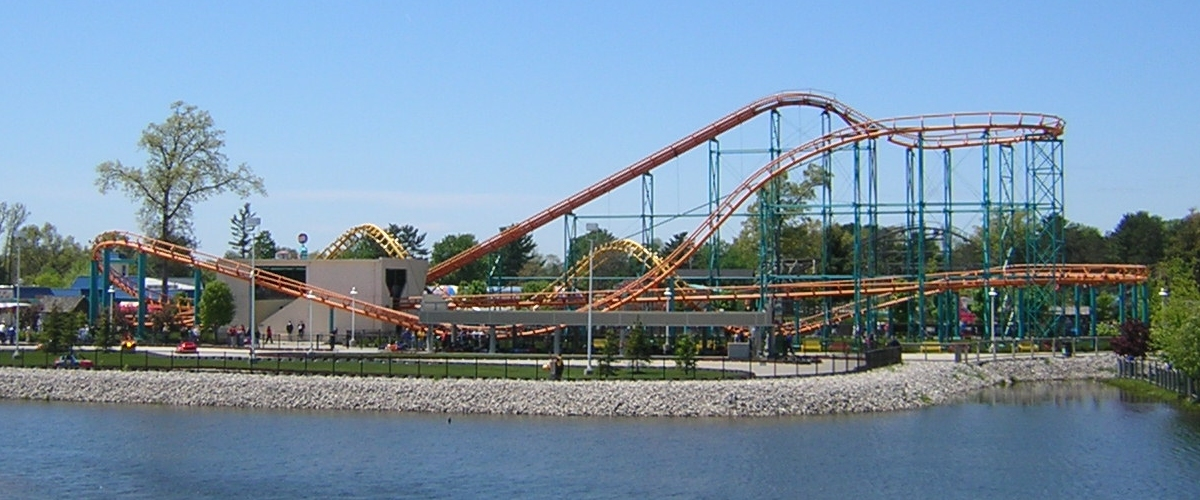
- Corkscrew as seen from Wolverine Wildcat

Michigan's Adventure
- Location: Michigan's Adventure
- Coordinates: 43.342979°N 86.279440°W
- Status: Operating
- Opening date: 1979

General statistics
- Type: Steel
- Manufacturer: Arrow Development
- Model: Corkscrew
- Lift/launch system: Chain lift hill
- Height: 70 ft (21 m)
- Length: 1,250 ft (380 m)
- Speed: 45 mph (72 km/h)
- Inversions: 2
- Duration: 1:10
- Height restriction: 48 in (122 cm)
- Trains: Unknown number of trains with 6 cars; riders arranged 2 across in 2 rows for a total of 24 riders per train
- Corkscrew at RCDB

Corkscrew is a steel roller coaster at Michigan's Adventure in Muskegon, Michigan. It was manufactured by Arrow Development, opened in 1979, and was the park's first roller coaster.

== History ==
Corkscrew was added to Michigan's Adventure when it was known as Deer Park Funland. It was the first inverting roller coaster in Michigan.

The ride is one of the oldest Arrow Development Corkscrew coasters still in operation. It is the same model and layout as the original Corkscrew at Knott's Berry Farm in Buena Park, California, as well as Magnus at Salitre Mágico in Bogotá, Colombia.

== Ride experience ==
The ride has two corkscrew inversions. The ride is 70 feet (21 m) tall and 1,250 feet (380 m) long. It features top speeds of 45 miles per hour (72 km/h) and lasts approximately one minute and 10 seconds.

The ride in 2026
