= Mad Mouse (Michigan's Adventure) =

Wild mouse roller coaster

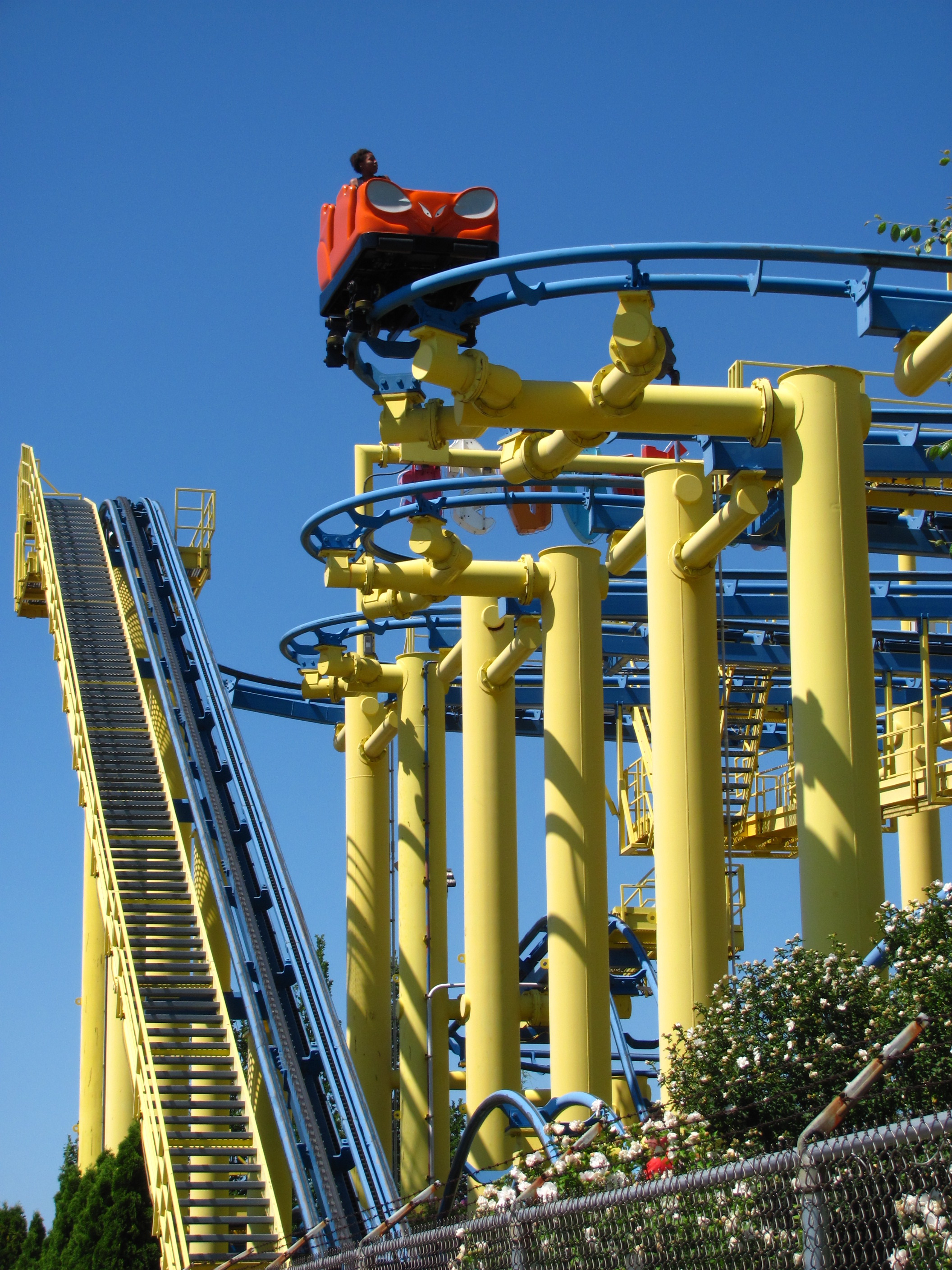
- Mad Mouse's lift hill in 2011

Michigan's Adventure
- Location: Michigan's Adventure
- Coordinates: 43.34740°N 86.27890°W
- Status: Operating
- Opening date: August 7, 1999
- Cost: $2,000,000

General statistics
- Type: Steel – Wild mouse
- Manufacturer: Arrow Dynamics
- Model: Mad Mouse
- Lift/launch system: Chain lift hill
- Height: 68 ft (21 m)
- Length: 1,268 ft (386 m)
- Speed: 33 mph (53 km/h)
- Duration: 1:30
- Height restriction: 42 in (107 cm)
- Trains: Unknown number of trains with a single car; riders arranged 2 across in 2 rows for a total of 4 riders per train
- Fast Lane available
- Mad Mouse at RCDB

Mad Mouse is a steel wild mouse roller coaster located at Michigan's Adventure in Muskegon, Michigan. It was manufactured by Arrow Dynamics. Mad Mouse was the park's fifth roller coaster, opening in 1999.

The ride is 68 feet (21 m) tall, 1,268 feet (386 m) long, and has an approximate ride cycle duration of one minute and 30 seconds. In 2022, the coaster was repainted.
