= Stampida =

Roller coaster at PortAventura Park

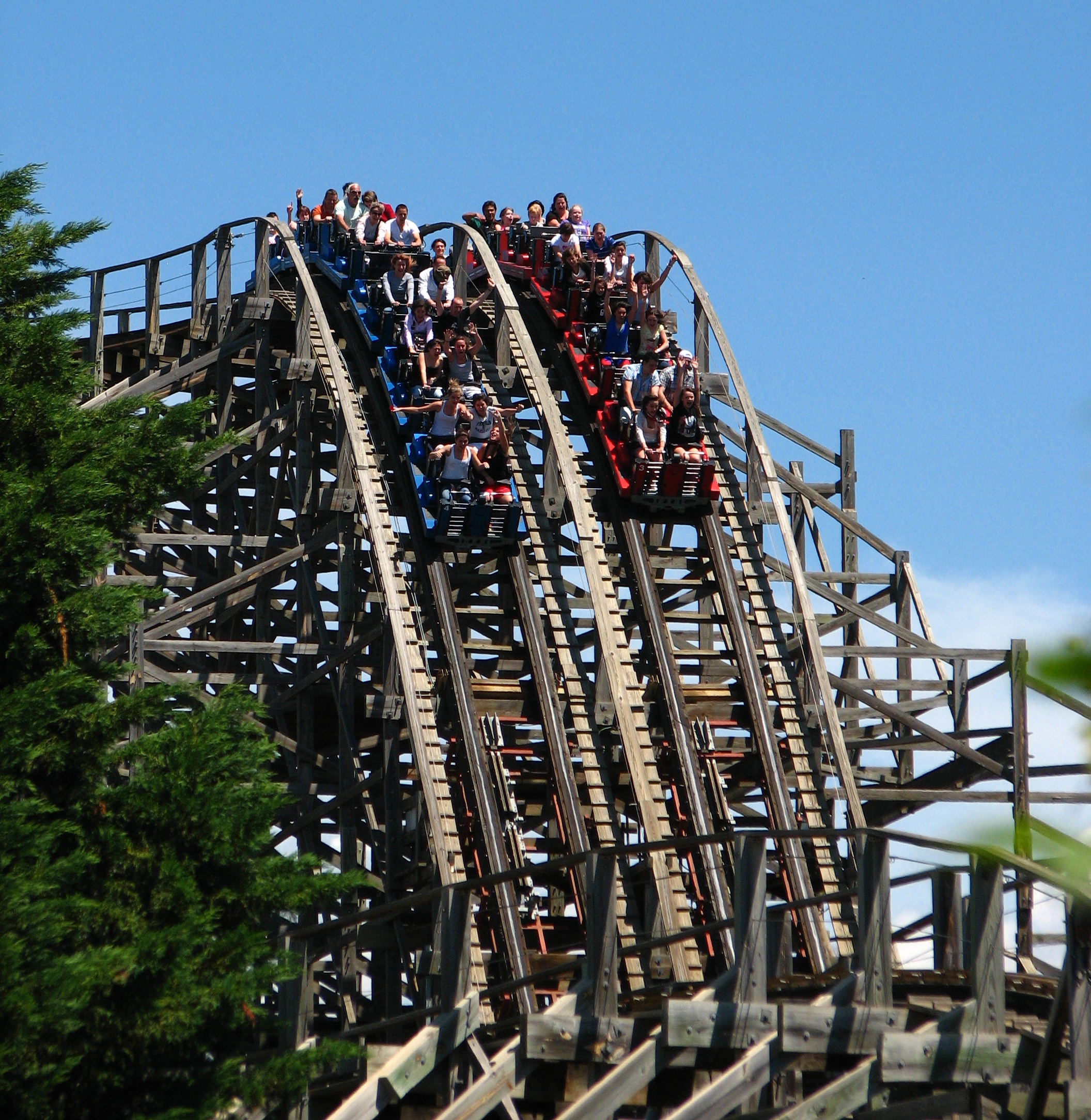
- Stampida's first drop

PortAventura Park
- Park section: Far West
- Coordinates: 41.0904°N 1.15658°E
- Status: Operating
- Opening date: March 17, 1997

General statistics
- Type: Wood – Racing
- Manufacturer: Custom Coasters International
- Designer: John Wardley, Larry Bill
- Lift/launch system: Chain lift hill
	Red	Blue
Height	84 ft (25.6 m)	84 ft (25.6 m)
Length	3,127 ft (953.1 m)	3,127 ft (953.1 m)
Speed	46 mph (74.0 km/h)	46 mph (74.0 km/h)
Inversions	0	0
Duration	1:40	1:40
Max vertical angle	52°	52°
- Height restriction: 120 cm (3 ft 11 in)
- Trains: 4 trains with 6 cars. Riders are arranged 2 across in 2 rows for a total of 24 riders per train.
- Stampida at RCDB; Pictures of Stampida at RCDB

Stampida is a racing wooden roller coaster at PortAventura Park in Salou and Vila-seca, Catalonia, Spain. Designed by John Wardley and Larry Bill, the ride opened in 1997 and was built by Custom Coasters International. The ride is located in the Far West section of the park, and is themed to a duel in wagons to claim land in the American frontier. Standing at a height of 26 metres (84 ft) feet, Stampida features a 52-degree drop, reaching a top speed of 74 kilometres per hour (46 mph). Each track measures 953 metres (3,127 ft) in length and offers approximately one minute and forty seconds of ride time.

== History ==
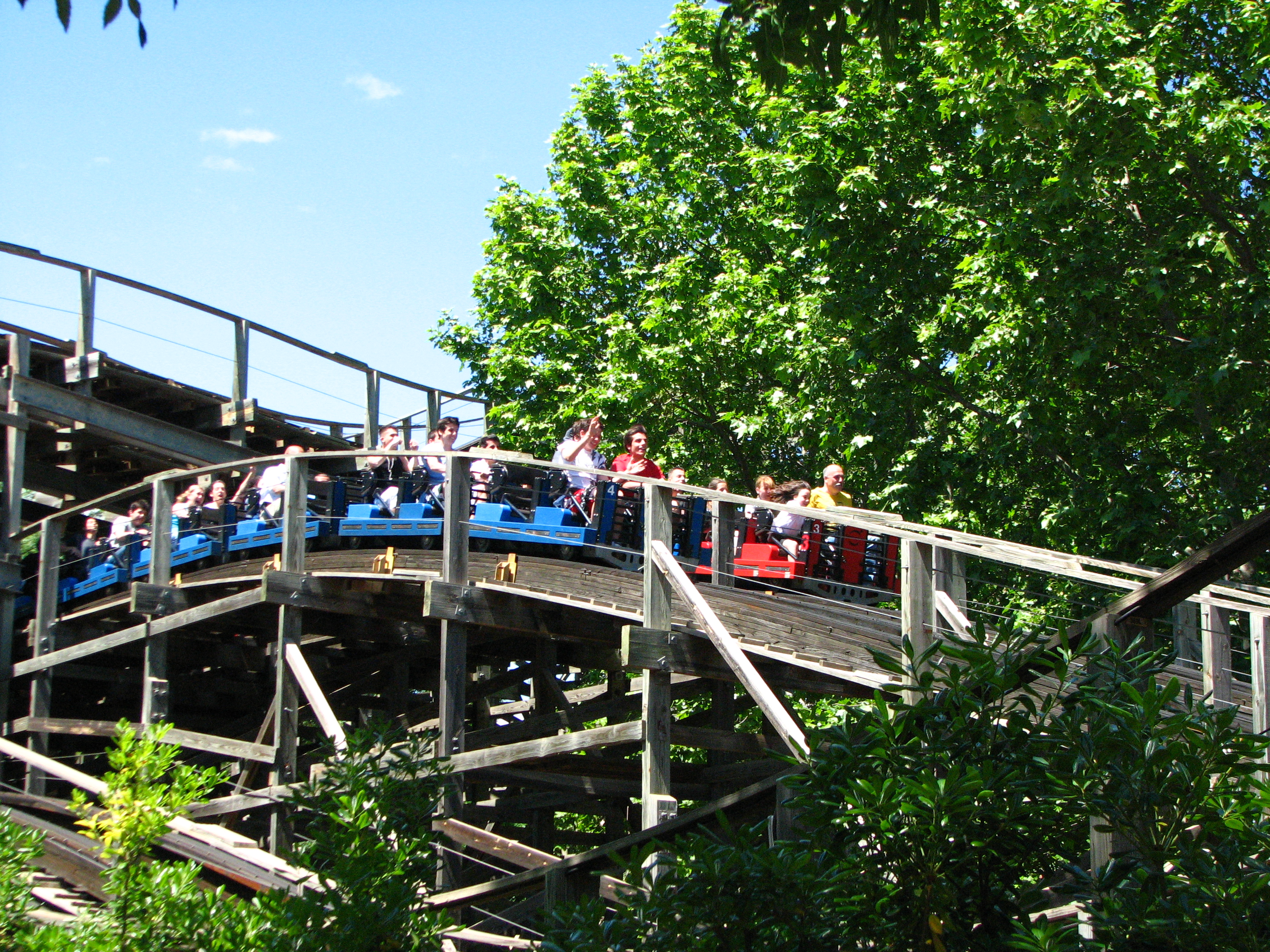
Stampida's KumbaK trains cresting one of the ride's hills

At the time of the ride's development, park operator The Tussauds Group held a 40.01% share of PortAventura Park. As a second-phase expansion, Tussauds park developer John Wardley suggested a racing wooden roller coaster, in part due to its high guest engagement both on-ride and off-ride. To make the ride more unique, his proposed layout included a section in which both tracks entered a tunnel together and diverged before exiting, then approached each other head-on to create a near miss effect.

Wardley designed the layout in conjunction with Larry Bill from Custom Coasters International (CCI), the roller coaster manufacturer who was hired to create the coaster. Wardley had worked with CCI in the past for Oakwood Theme Park's Megafobia wooden coaster. Stampida is one of only two dual-tracked roller coasters built by CCI (the other being the now-defunct Twisted Twins at Kentucky Kingdom). Stampida originally featured two-across, twelve-car trains with two rows per car built by Philadelphia Toboggan Coasters (PTC) which featured an individual mechanical lap bar for each seat, allowing a maximum theoretical capacity of 2,500 riders per hour. In contrast to the 26-metre-tall (84 ft), 953-metre-long (3,127 ft) Stampida, Tomahawk, another wooden roller coaster built by CCI, was placed next to Stampida as smaller, single-tracked coaster aimed at a younger audience. Tomahawk's layout runs next to Stampida's tracks, interacting at several points. Both Stampida and Tomahawk officially opened on 17 March 1997.

In 2007, the park contracted KumbaK to make modifications to Stampida and Tomahawk. Stampida's original PTC trains were replaced with four trains built by KumbaK, which replicated the previous seating arrangement. Each seat featured an individual lap bar and no seat belt, and each row had a video camera supplied by Ridercam of Germany. KumbaK additionally replaced the ride's control system and added magnetic brakes to the coaster, quoted to improve the ride's capacity by up to fifteen percent.

== Ride experience ==
=== Theme ===
Stampida is located in park's Far West land, themed to the American frontier. The ride's storyline revolves around land claims during the European discovery of America. According to the narrative, the Connery and Cranberry families built each side of the roller coaster, with the coaster's racing trains themed to wagons in a duel to claim land.

=== Layout ===
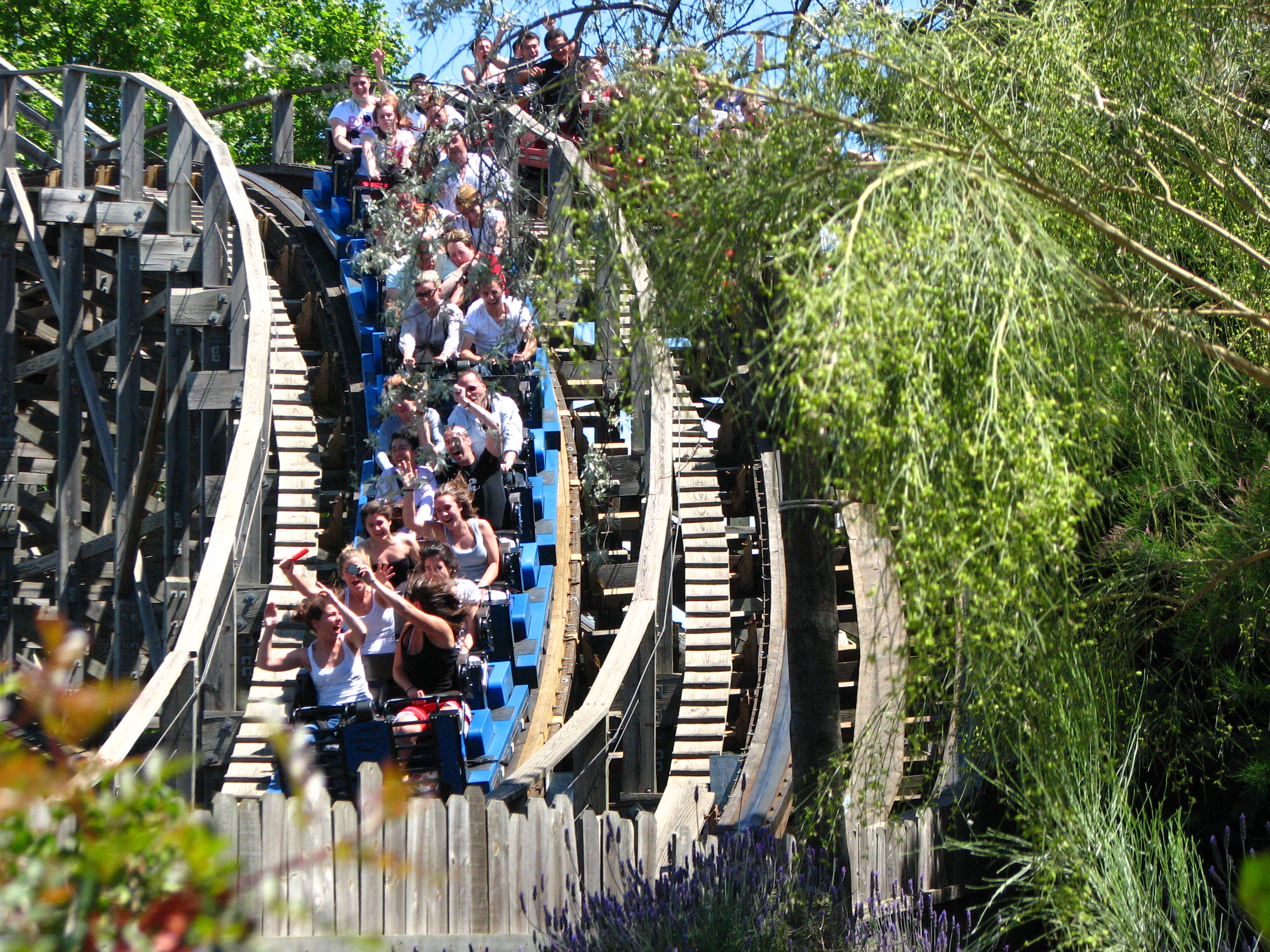
Trains traversing one of the ride's turns

After dispatching from the station, riders on both tracks climb adjacent chain lift hills, reaching a maximum height of 26 metres (84 ft). Riders make a right turn followed by a drop at a 52-degree angle, reaching their maximum speed of 74 kilometres per hour (46 mph), then climb a slope before making an ascending right turn. Riders then drop back to ground level before traversing a double up, a left turn, and a double down. Entering a tunnel, the tracks split; the red track drops while twisting to the right before making an approximately 270-degree curve in the same direction, while the blue track traverses an enclosed elevated right turn prior to a nearly 360-degree curve to the left. This creates a near miss effect of the trains approaching each other head-on. The tracks then join together once more for a final hill and right turn into the brake run.

== Incidents ==
On 5 July 1997, a 32-year-old from the Canary Islands was ejected from one of Stampida's trains during the right turn following the ride's first drop, falling approximately 3 metres (9.8 ft). His lap bar was still closed and locked when the train returned to the station. He died on the way to a hospital in Tarragona.
