= Wind Chaser =

Roller coaster at Kentucky Kingdom

- Previously known as Twisted Sisters (1998–2001), Twisted Twins (2002–2007) and Storm Chaser (2016–2024)
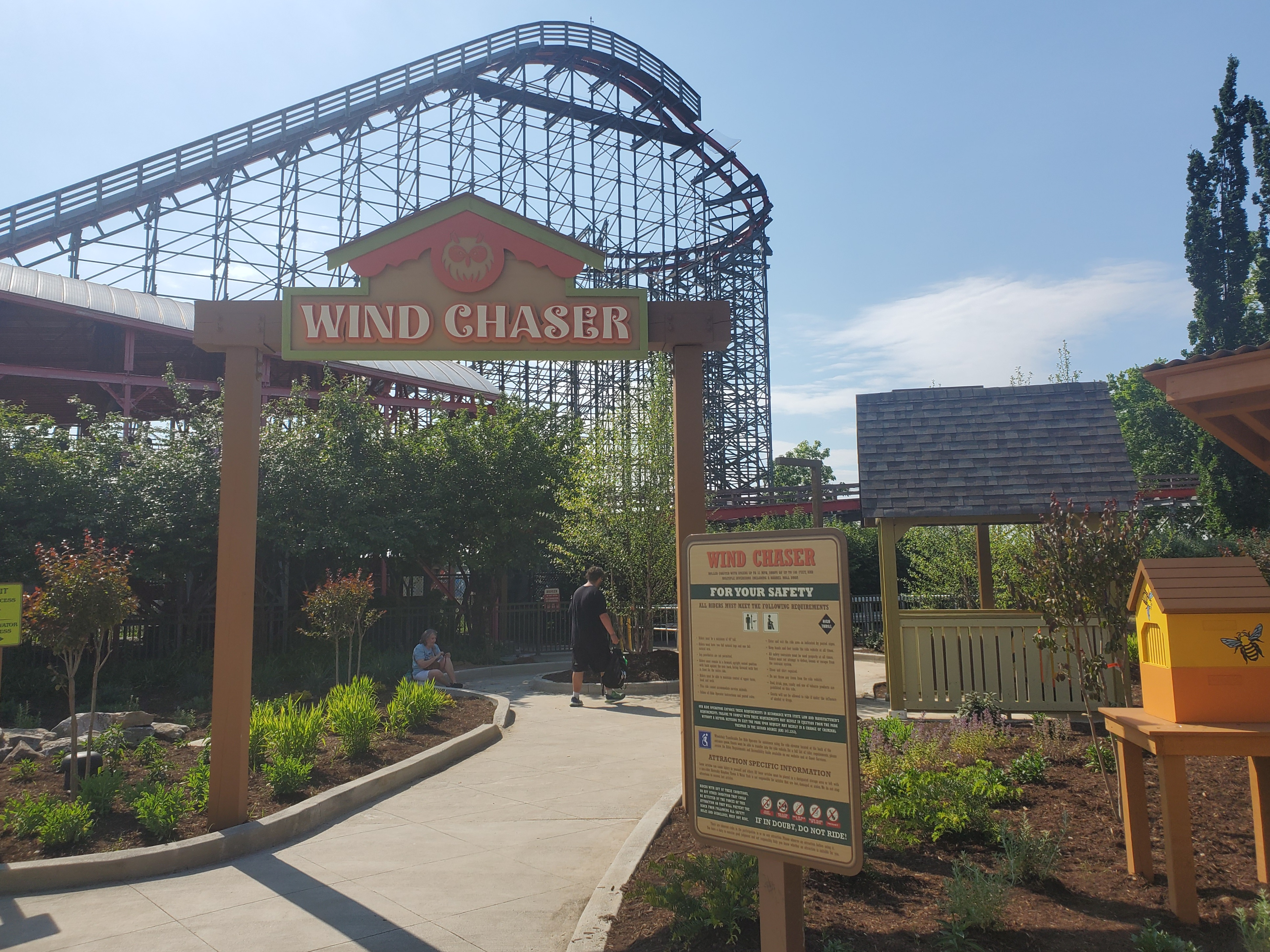
- Ride entrance

Kentucky Kingdom
- Location: Kentucky Kingdom
- Park section: Discovery Meadow
- Coordinates: 38.1958°N 85.7503°W
- Status: Operating
- Soft opening date: April 28, 2016
- Opening date: April 30, 2016
- Cost: $10 million
- Replaced: Twisted Twins

General statistics
- Type: Steel
- Manufacturer: Rocky Mountain Construction
- Designer: Alan Schilke
- Model: I-Box – Custom
- Lift/launch system: Chain lift hill
- Height: 100 ft (30 m)
- Length: 2,744 ft (836 m)
- Speed: 52 mph (84 km/h)
- Inversions: 3
- Duration: 1:40
- Max vertical angle: 78°
- Capacity: 960 riders per hour
- G-force: 3.8
- Height restriction: 48 in (122 cm)
- Trains: 2 trains with 6 cars; riders arranged 2 across in 2 rows for a total of 24 riders per train
- Wind Chaser at RCDB

Wind Chaser is a steel roller coaster located at Kentucky Kingdom in Louisville, Kentucky, United States. Designed by Alan Schilke and manufactured by Rocky Mountain Construction (RMC) at an estimated cost of $10 million, the ride opened to the public on April 30, 2016. It features three inversions, a 78-degree drop, and a maximum speed of 52 mph (84 km/h), utilizing RMC's patented I-Box tracks.

Originally manufactured by Custom Coasters International (CCI), the ride opened as a wooden dueling coaster named Twisted Sisters in 1998. After the band Twisted Sister threatened to sue the park, the name was changed to Twisted Twins in 2002. It closed indefinitely in 2007 in an attempt to cut costs within the park, and its future became uncertain after Kentucky Kingdom ceased operations following the 2009 season.

RMC was hired to refurbish the ride as Storm Chaser for the 2016 season, two years after the park reopened in 2014. As a budgetary measure, some of the supports from Twisted Twins were reused. It was nominated for Best New Ride of 2016 in Amusement Today's Golden Ticket Awards, placing second behind Dollywood's Lightning Rod, another ride built by RMC.

For the 2025 season, the area around Storm Chaser was converted into a new themed area, Discovery Meadow, prompting the ride's renaming and retheming to Wind Chaser.

== History ==
In September 1997, operation rights for Kentucky Kingdom were sold by Themeparks LLC to Premier Parks for $64 million. Weeks after the deal was finalized in November 1997, the new operators announced plans to build a $5-million dueling roller coaster, called Double Trouble, to open for the 1998 season. The name was later changed to Twisted Sisters prior to the ride's opening. Following the purchase of Six Flags by Premier Parks in June 1998, the park was rebranded as Six Flags Kentucky Kingdom.

In 2002, the heavy metal band Twisted Sister threatened the park with legal action regarding the name of the roller coaster. To avoid a lawsuit, the park changed the ride's name to Twisted Twins. It operated under that name until the end of the 2007 season when the park closed the ride indefinitely, and its Gerstlauer-built trains were relocated to Six Flags St. Louis to be used as spare parts for The Boss, another CCI ride with Gerstlauer trains.

Amid corporate bankruptcy on February 4, 2010, Six Flags announced that the park would cease operations immediately following the rejection of an amended lease by the Kentucky State Fair Board. Former operator of Kentucky Kingdom, Ed Hart, along with several other investors, formed the Kentucky Kingdom Redevelopment Company, with the aim of reopening the park quickly. However, plans were abandoned after sixteen months of negotiations. On February 23, 2012, the Kentucky Fair Board approved a lease agreement which would see the park operate as Bluegrass Boardwalk. The plans called for the removal of Twisted Twins and T2 as a result of safety concerns.

On June 27, 2013, Hart's group negotiated an agreement to spend $36 million to reopen the park in May 2014. They also announced plans to transform Twisted Twins into "a much superior ride" and hoped to reopen it in 2016. RMC was eventually hired to refurbish the roller coaster with their I-Box track. In July 2015, Kentucky Kingdom announced plans to name the renovated ride Storm Chaser and open it for the 2016 season. The estimated cost of the refurbishment was $10 million.

After acquiring Kentucky Kingdom in 2021, Herschend announced an $11 million investment into creating the Discovery Meadow themed section for the 2025 season. This area incorporated Storm Chaser, which was renamed to Wind Chaser. After a ribbon-cutting ceremony on May 8, 2025, Discovery Meadow debuted alongside the newly renamed Wind Chaser, as the park opened for the 2025 season on May 10.

== Characteristics ==
=== Twisted Twins/Twisted Sisters ===
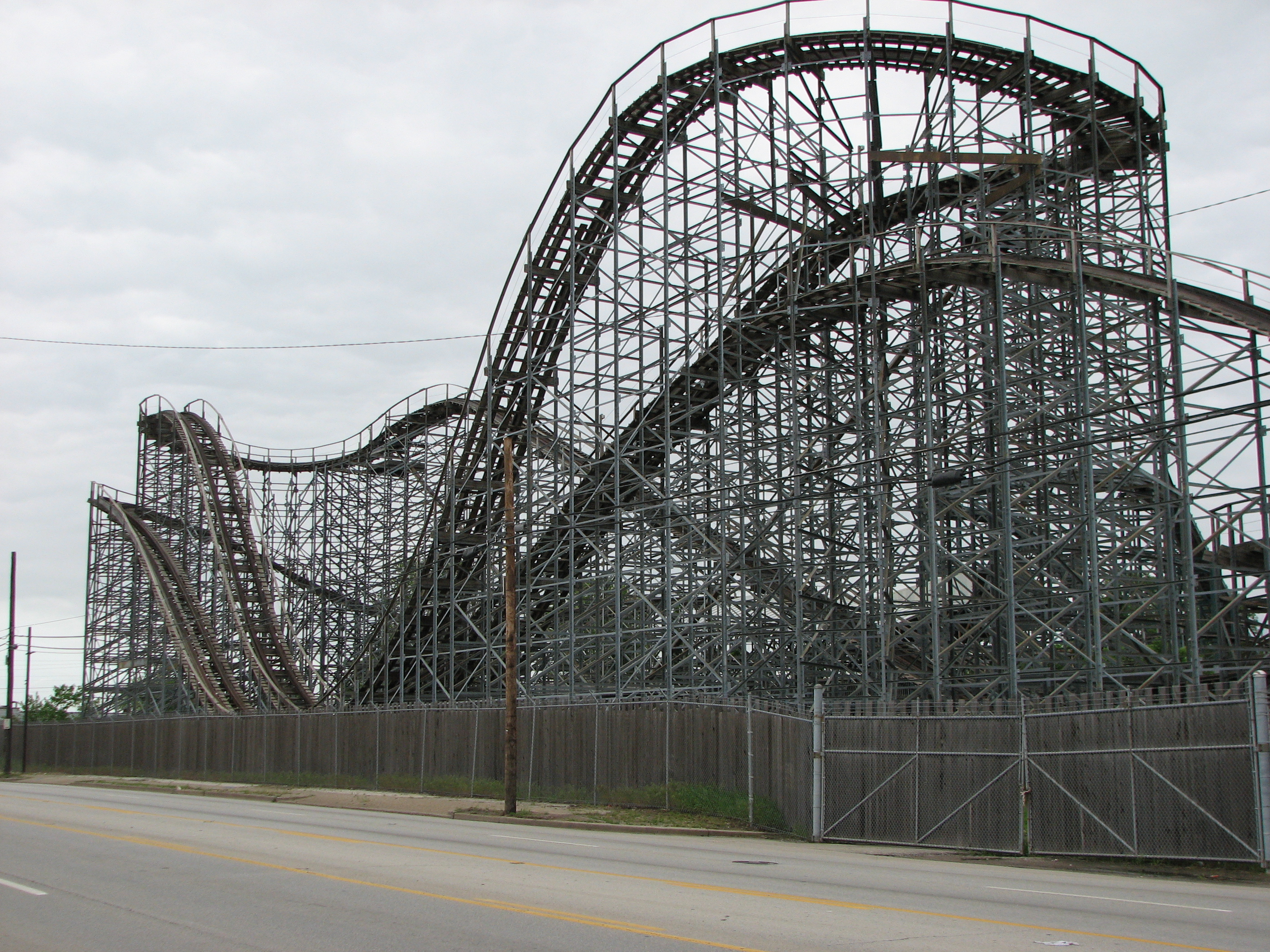
Twisted Twins, prior to reconfiguration into Wind Chaser

In its original form, Twisted Twins was a dueling wooden roller coaster, which featured two roller coaster tracks that departed from opposite ends of a single station. The two tracks followed different paths, passing by each other four times. Both tracks measured 3,000 feet (910 m) in length, stood 80 feet (24 m) tall, and featured top speeds of 55 miles per hour (89 km/h). The ride was one of only two dueling roller coasters manufactured by CCI (the other being Stampida at PortAventura Park). The ride was designed by Dennis McNulty and Larry Bill. Construction of Twisted Twins was handled by Martin & Vleminckx.

Trains manufactured by Gerstlauer ran on each of the tracks. These two trains were named Stella and Lola. Each train seated 28 riders across seven cars configured in two rows of two. These trains required riders to be of a minimum height of 48 inches (120 cm).

=== Wind Chaser/Storm Chaser ===
Wind Chaser utilized some components of Twisted Twins' structure as a budgetary feature. Wind Chaser utilized RMC's steel I-Box track system to create the ride experience of a steel roller coaster on the structure of a wooden one, including the addition of inversions.

=== Comparison ===
Statistic	Twisted Twins/Twisted Sisters	Wind Chaser/Storm Chaser
Years	1998–2007	2016–present
Manufacturer	Custom Coasters International	Rocky Mountain Construction
Designer	Dennis McNulty, Larry Bill	Alan Schilke
Track type	Wooden	Steel
Track layout	Dual-tracked	Out-and-back
Height	80 ft (24 m)	100 ft (30 m)
Length	3,000 ft or 910 m	2,744 ft or 836 m
Speed	55 mph (89 km/h)	52 mph (84 km/h)
Maximum vertical angle	Unknown	78°
Maximum g-force	3.2	3.8
Capacity	Unknown	960 riders per hour
Duration	2:12	1:40
Inversions	0	2
Train manufacturer	2 trains by Gerstlauer	2 trains by Rocky Mountain Construction

== Ride experience ==
=== Wind Chaser/Storm Chaser ===
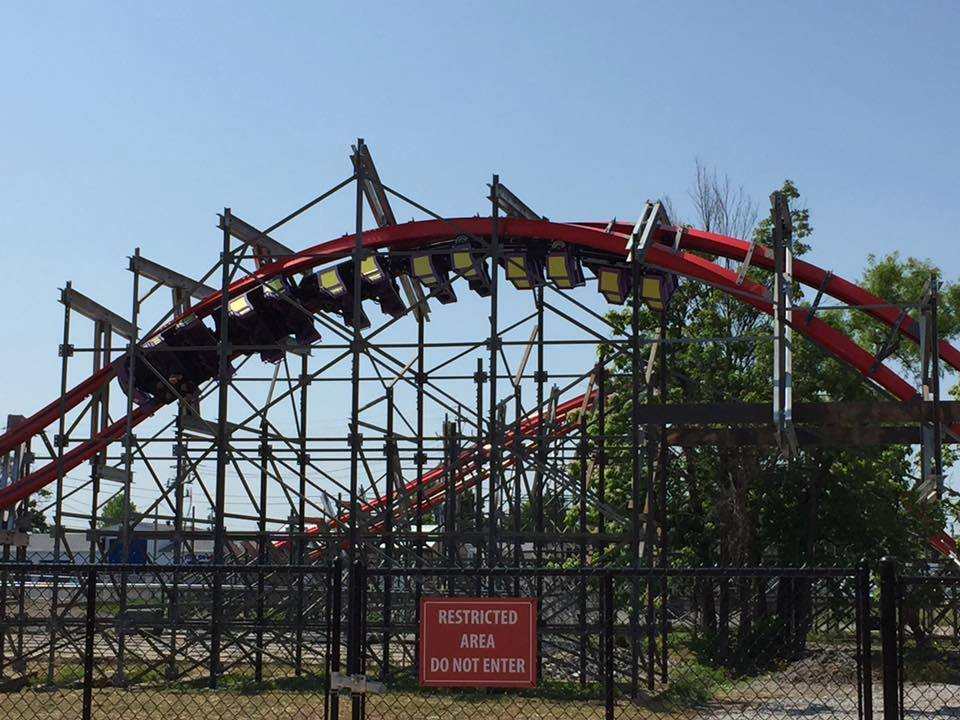
Wind Chaser's corkscrew inversion

Wind Chaser departs the station and makes a u-turn to the right to start up its lift hill. After cresting the top of the lift, the train banks left and enters a barrel-roll drop back down to ground level, followed by an airtime hill and an overbanked left-hand turn that inverts the train. It then climbs another hill and banks right before turning to the left and heading back in the opposite direction while rounding an overbanked turn to the right.

The train crests another airtime hill before banking right and entering the final inversion, a corkscrew. Exiting the corkscrew and banking to the left, it passes over a series of camelback hills where the banking varies from side to side. The train then enters a 270-degree banked helix to the right, rises to the left, and enters the final brake run before returning to the station.

== Reception ==
All awards given to the ride were given following its conversion by RMC.

Golden Ticket Awards: Best New Ride for 2016
Ranking	2

Golden Ticket Awards: Top steel Roller Coasters
Year									1998	1999
Ranking									–	–
Year	2000	2001	2002	2003	2004	2005	2006	2007	2008	2009
Ranking	–	–	–	–	–	–	–	–	–	–
Year	2010	2011	2012	2013	2014	2015	2016	2017	2018	2019
Ranking	–	–	–	–	–	–	28	33	47	–
Year	2020	2021	2022	2023	2024	2025	2026			
Ranking	N/A	–	–	–	–	–	–			
