= The Boss (roller coaster) =

Wooden roller coaster

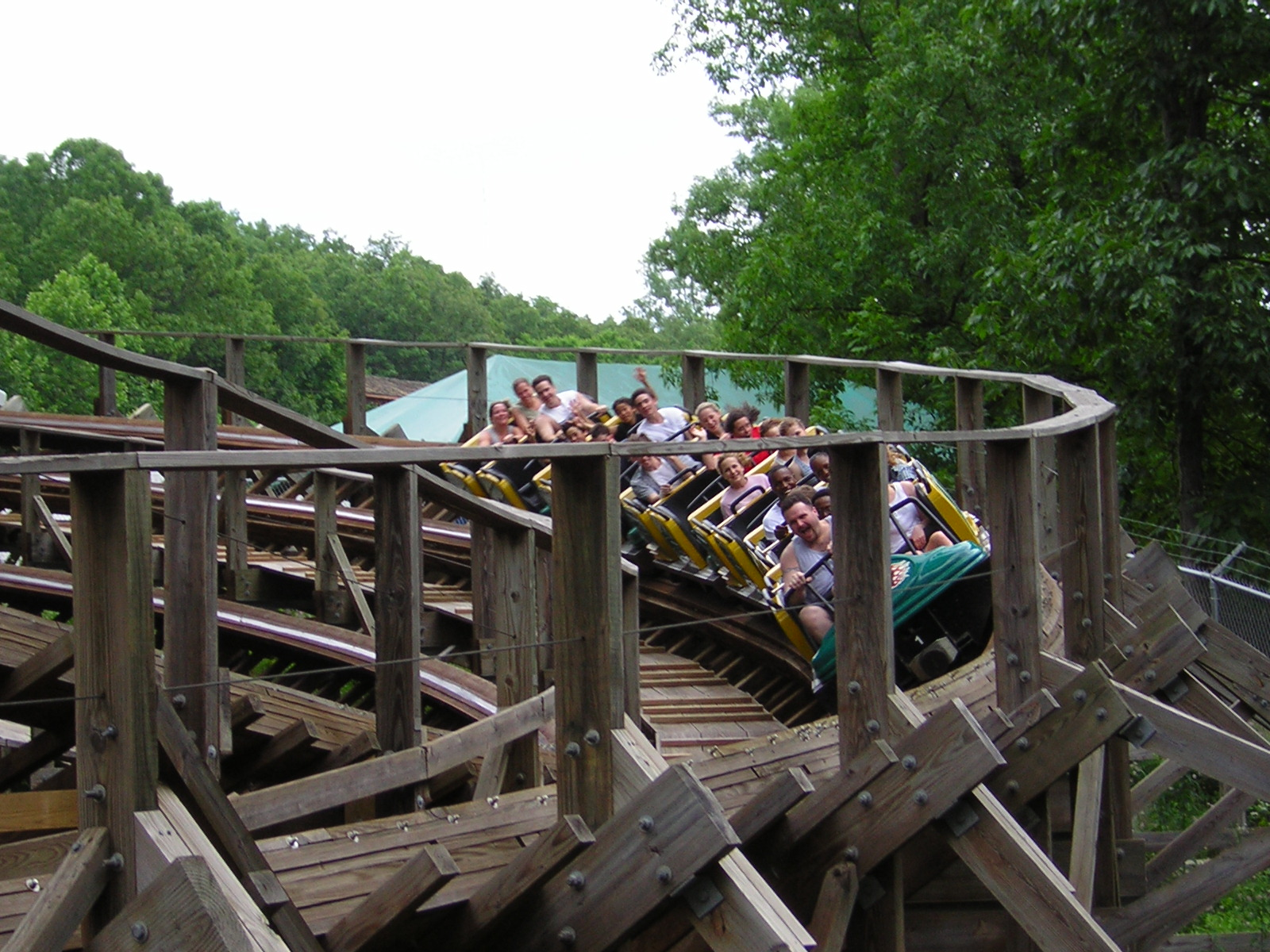
- The Boss at Mid America Adventure

Mid America Adventure
- Location: Mid America Adventure
- Park section: Britannia
- Coordinates: 38°30′58″N 90°40′44″W
- Status: Operating
- Opening date: April 29, 2000

General statistics
- Type: Wood
- Manufacturer: Custom Coasters International
- Designer: Dennis McNulty; Larry Bill
- Track layout: Terrain
- Height: 122 ft (37 m)
- Drop: 150 ft (46 m)
- Length: 4,631 ft (1,412 m)
- Speed: 66.3 mph (106.7 km/h)
- Inversions: 0
- Max vertical angle: 52°
- Capacity: 1400 riders per hour
- Height restriction: 48 in (122 cm)
- Trains: 3 trains with 6 cars; riders arranged 2 across in 2 rows for a total of 24 riders per train
- Fast Lane available
- The Boss at RCDB

The Boss is a wooden roller coaster located in the Britannia section of Mid America Adventure in Eureka, Missouri. It opened on April 29, 2000, and was manufactured by Custom Coasters International. It features a lift hill height of 122 feet (37 m) and a first drop of 150 feet (46 m). Prior to the 2018 season, it also featured a 570-degree helix.

== History ==
In September 1999, then-named Six Flags St. Louis announced that they would be adding a new wooden roller coaster for the 2000 season. Built by Custom Coasters International (CCI), it would be located towards the back of the park in the Britannia section. The park presented the city of Eureka with the new coaster blueprints.

On February 3, 2000, the park revealed more details about their upcoming attraction. The new ride would be named The Boss and be a large terrain wooden roller coaster, very similar to The Beast at Kings Island. It would cover 12 acres (4.9 ha) of land on the northwest edge of the property, crossing over itself six times and ending with a 560-degree helix.

The Boss was originally set to open on April 21, 2000, but the coaster's opening was delayed to April 29. It has been acclaimed for its "terrain twister" style, dipping up and down with the terrain beneath it.

In 2009, the coaster got spare Gerstlauer trains from Twisted Twins at Kentucky Kingdom after the coasters wing of the park was closed. It had previously received other spare trains from Mega Zeph at Six Flags New Orleans.

During the ride's winter rehab prior to the start of the 2018 season, the 570° helix was removed and replaced with a 180 degree banked turn, shortening the coaster by 420 feet (130 m). The coaster used to be 5,021 feet of track.

Before the start of the 2025 season, The Boss received about 215 feet of steel Titan Track from Great Coasters International in the ravine in between the first drop and the first elevated turnaround.

== Ride experience ==
Out of the station, the track passes through the transfer track, and makes a slight left turn before making a right hand turn to climb the 122 feet (37 m) lift hill. At the top of the lift hill, the track makes a left turn and dives down a 150 feet (46 m) drop into a ravine, leveling out as it zooms through the structure of the third hill and rises into an elevated turnaround. It then dives down a 112 feet (34 m) drop back into the ravine, and rises up a third hill. At the top of the hill, the track makes a level right hand turn into the midcourse brakes. The track then takes a 103 feet (31 m) dive off the midcourse brakes, followed by a 72 feet (22 m) tall turnaround. Following this, the track makes a right turn, passes under the lift hill, and over a pair of smaller airtime hills with slight right turns, before making a 180 degree banked turnaround (570 degree double helix prior to 2018), leading into a bunny hop and the final brake run. This is concluded with a left hand turn to return to the station.

== Characteristics ==
Formerly the eighth longest wooden coaster in the world prior to the 2018 removal of the helix.

== Awards ==
Golden Ticket Awards: Top wood Roller Coasters
Year									1998	1999
Ranking									–	–
Year	2000	2001	2002	2003	2004	2005	2006	2007	2008	2009
Ranking	–	15	17	17	22	36	33	32	46	33
Year	2010	2011	2012	2013	2014	2015	2016	2017	2018	2019
Ranking	31	42	42 (tie)	–	48	42	31	28	43	36
Year	2020	2021	2022	2023	2024	2025	2026			
Ranking	N/A	42	43	39	–	43	41			
