= New Mexico Rattler =

Roller coaster at Cliff's Amusement Park

The New Mexico Rattler

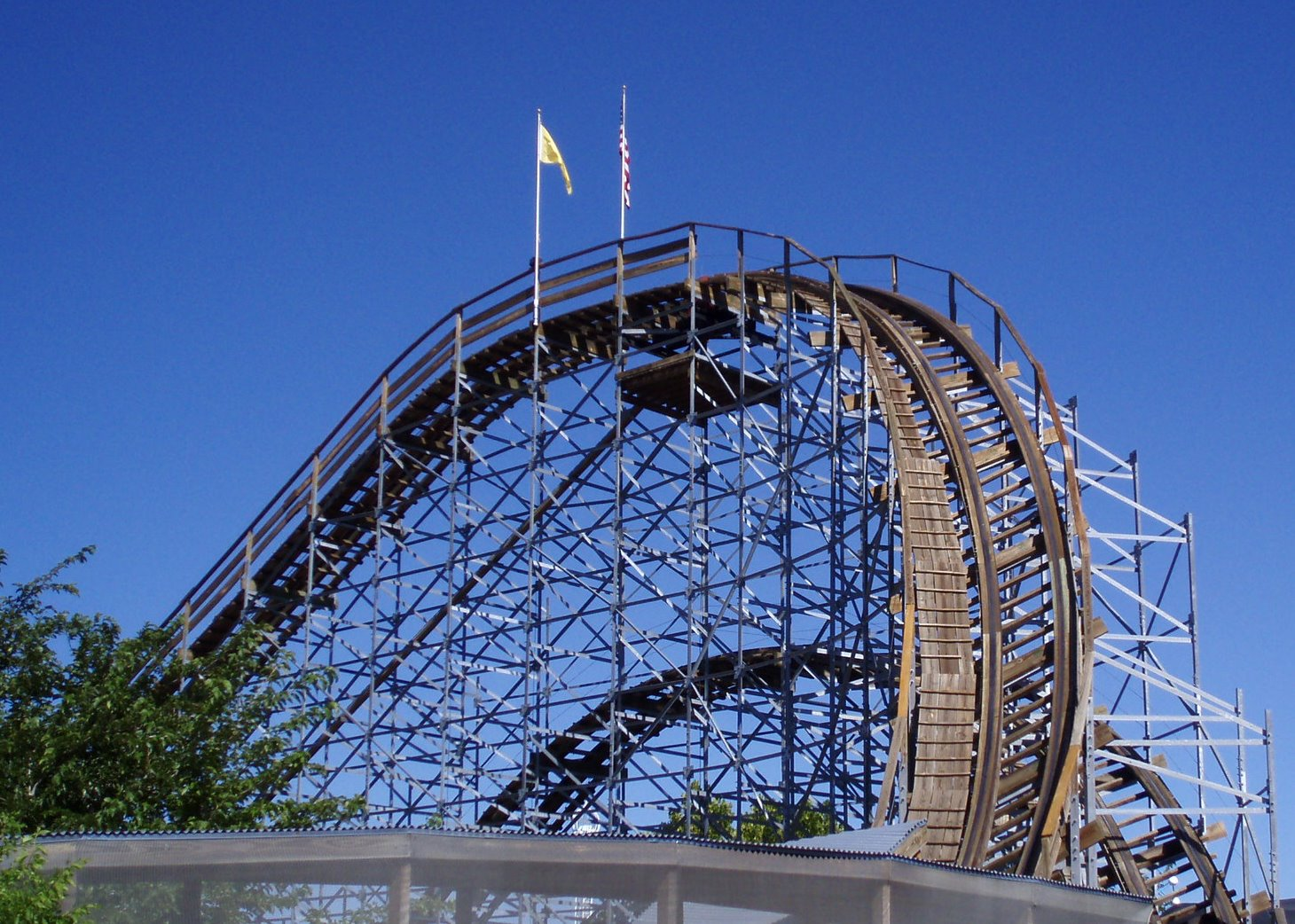

Cliff's Amusement Park
- Location: Cliff's Amusement Park
- Coordinates: 35.143028°N 106.588417°W
- Status: Operating
- Opening date: September 28, 2002
- Cost: $2,000,000 ($3.58 million in 2025 dollars)

General statistics
- Type: Wood – Hybrid
- Manufacturer: Custom Coasters International
- Track layout: Out and back and twister
- Height: 80 ft (24 m)
- Drop: 75 ft (23 m)
- Length: 2,750 ft (840 m)
- Speed: 47 mph (76 km/h)
- Duration: 1:15
- Max vertical angle: 52°
- G-force: 3.1
- Restraint style: Lap bar
- Trains: Single train with 6 cars; riders arranged 2 across in 2 rows for a total of 24 riders per train
- The New Mexico Rattler at RCDB

New Mexico Rattler, officially The New Mexico Rattler, is a hybrid roller coaster located at Cliff's Amusement Park in Albuquerque, New Mexico. The wooden roller coaster, which uses a steel support structure, was designed and manufactured by Custom Coasters International (CCI). The $2-million coaster opened to the public on September 28, 2002.

CCI went bankrupt before the final portion of the coaster was completed, delaying its opening. The park finished building the attraction in-house by hiring former CCI employees and other staff, resulting in additional costs for the project. The hybrid coaster reaches a height of 80 feet (24 m), a maximum speed of 47 mph (76 km/h), and features a total track length of 2,750 feet (840 m). Though it only occupies 1 acre (0.40 ha), its layout spans the entire length of the park.

== History ==
A major roller coaster at Cliff's Amusement Park had been proposed ten years prior to New Mexico Rattler's construction. The growing size of Albuquerque, New Mexico, was a contributing factor to constructing the roller coaster. By the early 2000s, the nearby population had grown enough and visited the park enough that a large addition to the park was feasible. In the aftermath of the September 11 attacks, park co-owner Gary Hays brought forward the construction of its conceived roller coaster by a year to help in the recovery of tourism. Then-mayor of Albuquerque Martin Chávez assisted in facilitating permits for the park to build the roller coaster, which faced some opposition from the city hall. Hays contracted Custom Coasters International (CCI) to manufacture and build the roller coaster in January 2002, based on their reputation and deals offered. A month later, groundbreaking and construction of the roller coaster began.

Park owners Gary and Linda Hays, as well as Chávez, announced the construction of the roller coaster at the Albuquerque city hall on February 20, 2002. The unnamed wooden roller coaster would cost $2 million to construct and have a projected opening date of June 21 of that year. They simultaneously announced a contest for the public to submit name suggestions for the attraction in local Wendy's locations. Park officials wanted to advertise the roller coaster to an adult demographic. The construction of the roller coaster would result in "15 to 30 jobs" being brought to the park, with the park aiming for an increase in attendance and a raise in admission prices for the 2003 season. Installation of concrete foundations began after the roller coaster's announcement.

The contest ended in April 2002, with the name "The New Mexico Rattler" chosen from a four-year-old's submission. The owners selected the name because of the ride's layout's likeness to the animal and ties to the state. In early May, steel supports began to be erected, with construction of the wooden track taking place soon after. The roller coaster's anticipated opening date was set back in June due to construction delays, and a new opening date was scheduled for mid-July. Pending delivery of construction materials set back its July opening date even further to the fall season. In late July, manufacturer CCI filed for Chapter 7 bankruptcy in the United States District Court for the Southern District of Ohio, ceasing operations and leaving the ride unfinished.

At the time of the manufacturer's bankruptcy, the "roller coaster was 95% finished". Following CCI's closure, the park independently employed seventeen workers previously from CCI alongside another eight workers to finish the roller coaster. The delays caused additional costs to the $2 million initially slated for its construction. The roller coaster was removed from advertising that had been intended to promote it until it opened. Final test runs for the roller coaster were conducted on September 27, 2002, and it opened to the public the next day, September 28.

== Ride experience ==
After leaving the station, the train dips to the right before ascending the 25.4-degree and 80-foot (24-meter) tall lift hill. Cresting the hill, the train descends the 52-degree and 75-foot (23-meter) drop, banking to the right and reaching maximum speeds of 47 mph (76 km/h). It then traverses a series of left-banked hills before descending into a drop. The train ascends to the left before dropping into a succession of curved hills and entering a right-banked hill. Following the banked hill, the train continually descends into a 125-foot (38-meter) tunnel, emerging in an upward right-banked turn. The train continues downward into a right turn, ascending a few hills before banking into the left turn. Exiting the turn, the train turns right into the final brake run before turning right to enter the station. A cycle of the roller coaster takes approximately one minute and fifteen seconds to complete.

== Characteristics ==
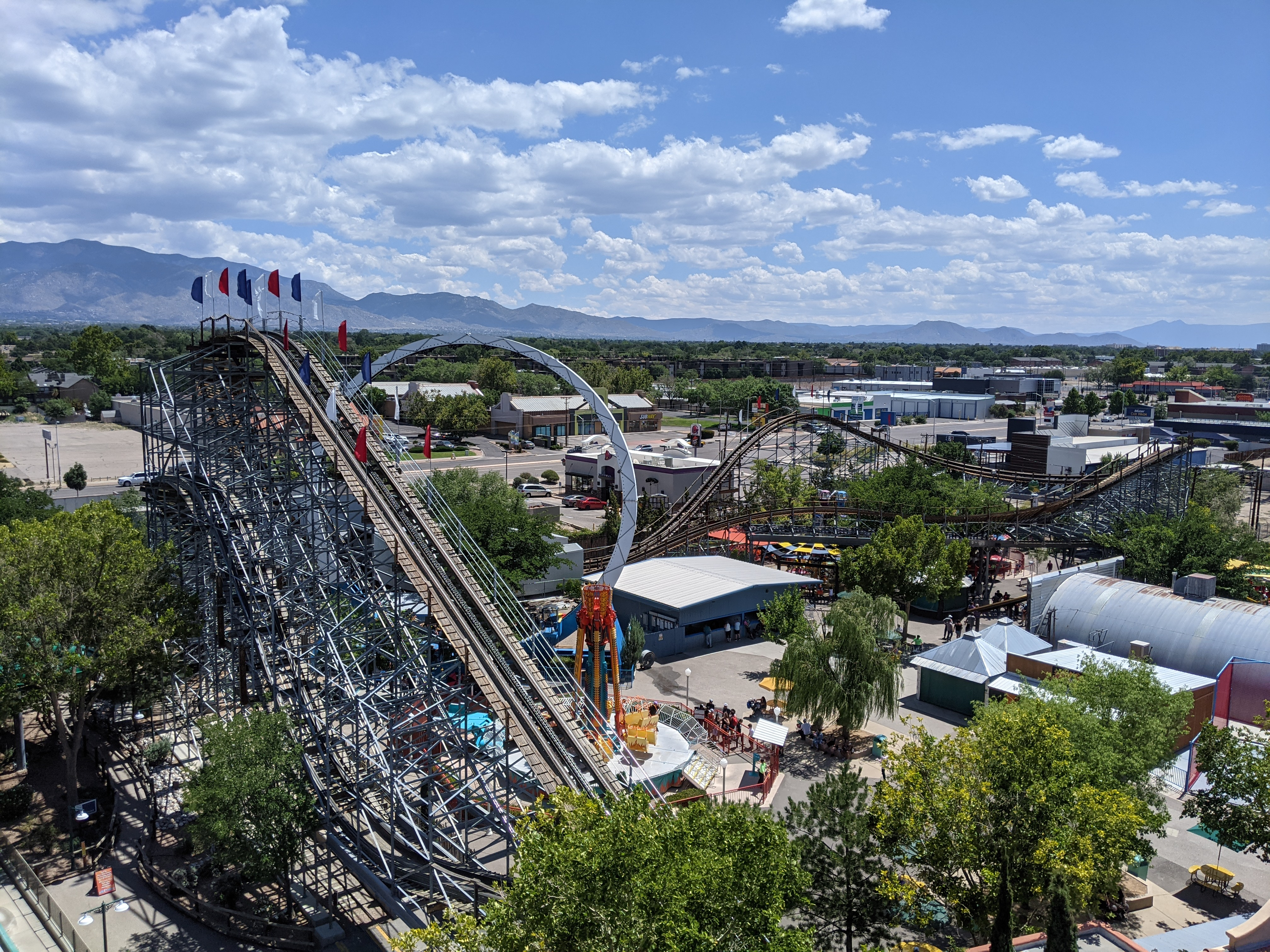
The lift hill and beginning turnaround of New Mexico Rattler, with the Fire Ball and Downdraft flat rides visible

New Mexico Rattler was primarily designed, manufactured, and constructed by Custom Coasters International. Before the manufacturer's bankruptcy, there were around 25 people who worked on building the wooden roller coaster, both from the company and locally. The park relocated several attractions to accommodate New Mexico Rattler's construction. The New Mexico Rattler was the first major roller coaster to be built in the state of New Mexico.

In contrast to more traditional wooden roller coasters, New Mexico Rattler utilizes steel supports, which allow for steeper drops and banking. The roller coaster exerts a maximum of 3.1 g-forces on its riders. It has a total track length of 2,750 feet (840 m), longer than the originally planned 2,620 feet (800 m). New Mexico Rattler operates with one train with six cars that contain two rows of two seats each, allowing for a maximum of 24 people per cycle. The train was built by Philadelphia Toboggan Coasters. Each seat contains a lap bar restraint system.

== Reception ==
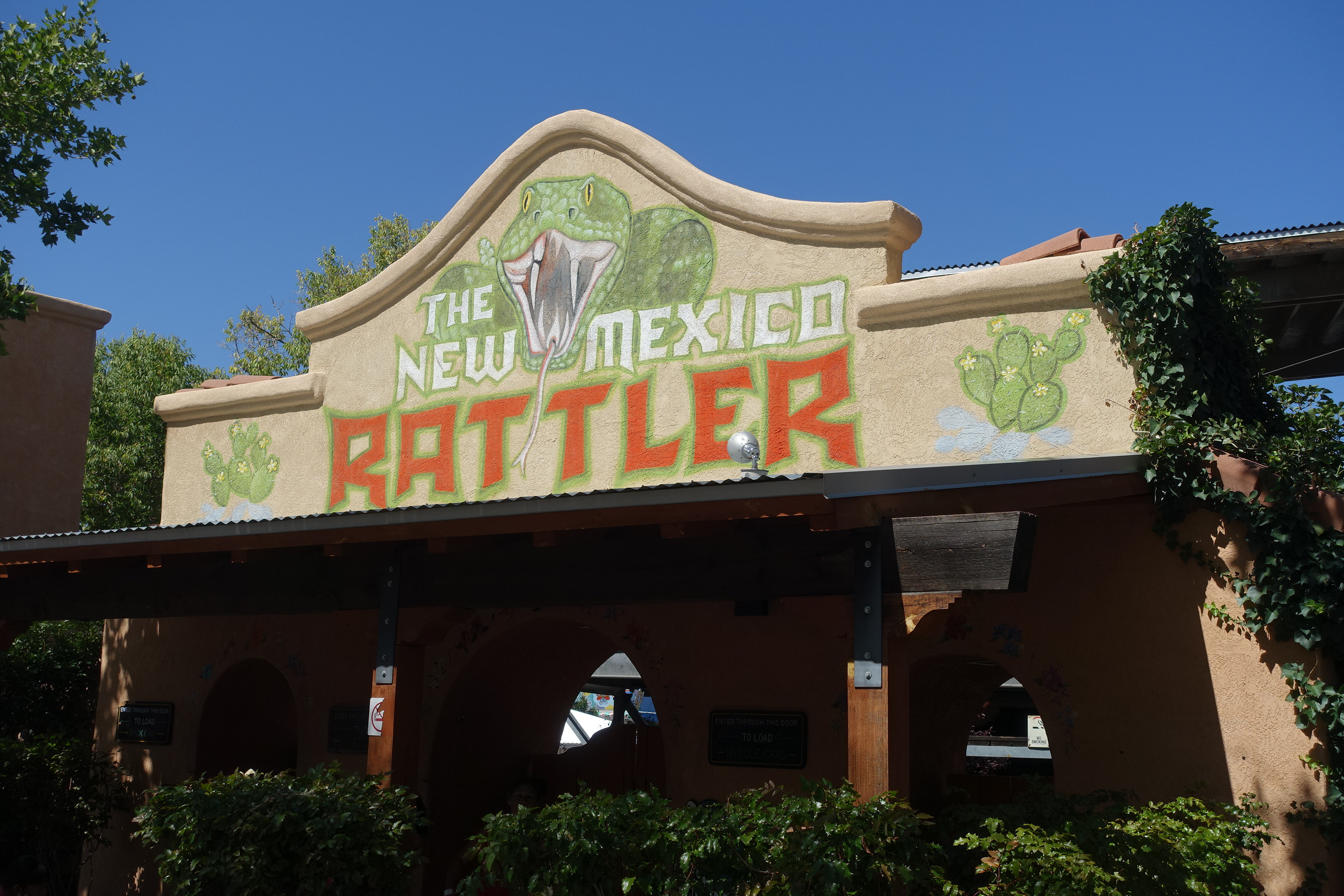
New Mexico Rattler's entrance

Upon opening, New Mexico Rattler received generally positive reviews from guests and critics. Leanne Potts, a writer for the Albuquerque Journal, commented on the roller coaster's nonstop pacing, stating there were "no pauses in the ride, no slowing down". Potts also remarked that after the initial drop "the speed is unrelenting", relating the experience to that of "falling off a five-story building and living to tell about it". Potts recorded several other guests' reactions to the roller coaster, with one guest commenting on the different ride experiences in the front and back and another expressing their enthusiasm for the roller coaster and their desire to ride it again.

=== Awards ===
During the International Association of Amusement Parks and Attractions (IAAPA) 2003 exposition, the park earned two Brass Rings in relation to its press kit and billboard advertisements for New Mexico Rattler. The owners of Cliff's Amusement Park also earned the "2003 Best Promotion Award" for actualizing the ride and for their marketing efforts. The New Mexico Rattler charted in Amusement Today's Golden Ticket Awards lists of the world's best wooden roller coasters for several years.

Golden Ticket Awards: Top wood Roller Coasters
Year									1998	1999
Ranking									–	–
Year	2000	2001	2002	2003	2004	2005	2006	2007	2008	2009
Ranking	–	–	–	–	24	30	36	35	49 (tie)	–
Year	2010	2011	2012	2013	2014	2015	2016	2017	2018	2019
Ranking	–	–	–	–	–	–	–	–	–	–
Year	2020	2021	2022	2023	2024	2025	2026			
Ranking	N/A	–	–	–	–	–	–			
