= Custom Coasters International =

Defunct American roller coaster manufacturer

- Industry: Manufacturing
- Founded: 1991
- Defunct: 2002
- Fate: Bankruptcy
- Successor: The Gravity Group; Great Coasters International
- Headquarters: West Chester, Ohio
- Area served: Worldwide
- Products: Wooden roller coasters

Custom Coasters International (CCI) was an American wooden roller coaster manufacturer that produced 34 wooden coasters in eleven years. It was located in West Chester, Ohio.

== History ==
Custom Coasters Incorporated opened its doors on September 1, 1991. The company was founded by Denise Dinn-Larrick, the daughter of coaster designer Charles Dinn — founder of the Dinn Corporation, her brother Jeff Dinn and her husband Randy Larrick. The original designers for the company included freelance design engineers Mike Boodley and Bill Kelley of California. Larry Bill, formerly with Curtis D. Summers & Associates joined the design team in 1992. Initially the company promoted small, affordable, family coasters but eventually progressed to larger models known for their speed and intensity. Once the company started working with international clients the name was changed in November 1994 to Custom Coasters International.

CCI filed for bankruptcy in 2002 while still building the New Mexico Rattler at Cliff's Amusement Park. Cliff's was left with a partially completed coaster and quickly hired the construction crew and completed the ride themselves. No attempt was made to reorganize the company and Denise Dinn, who by then had been divorced from Randy Larrick, filed for Chapter 7 bankruptcy which resulted in liquidation of the company's assets. Denise Dinn was hired by S&S Power to start a new wooden coaster division for that company. Four coasters were produced before that division was closed. Four of the designers for CCI (Larry Bill, Chad Miller, Korey Kiepert, and Michael Graham) founded The Gravity Group in 2002. Other coaster designers Bill Kelley, Dennis McNulty and Mike Boodley left CCI years before the company went bankrupt. Mike Boodley started Great Coasters International in 1994, Dennis McNulty returned to civil engineering in 1999 and Bill Kelley currently works for Dynamic Designs, Inc.

== List of roller coasters ==
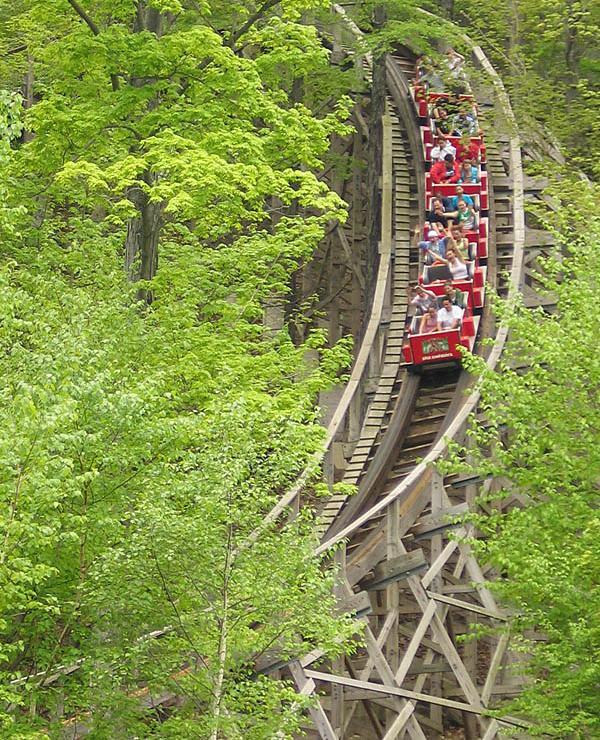
CCI's Boulder Dash at Lake Compounce

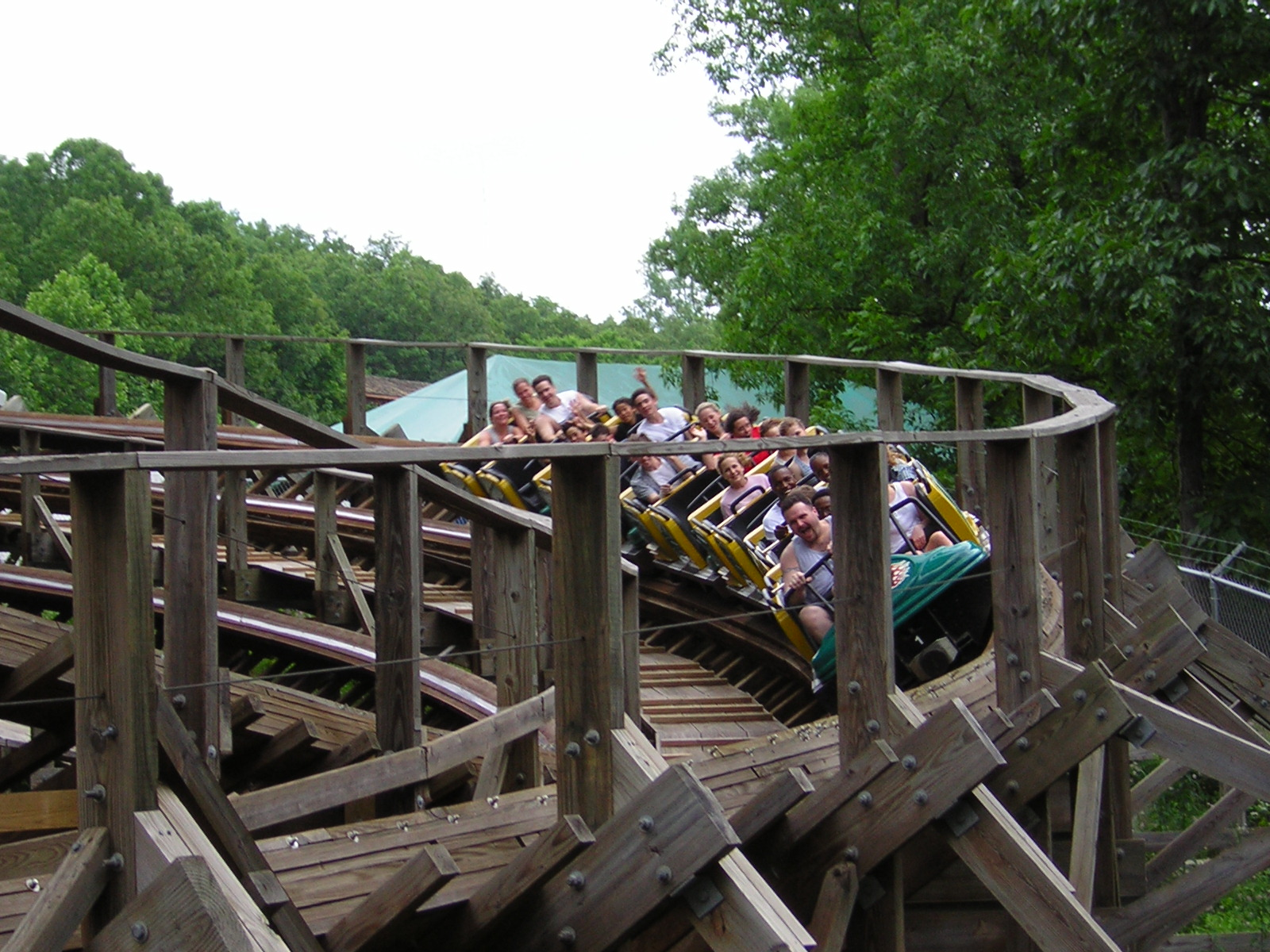
CCI's Boss at Mid America Adventure

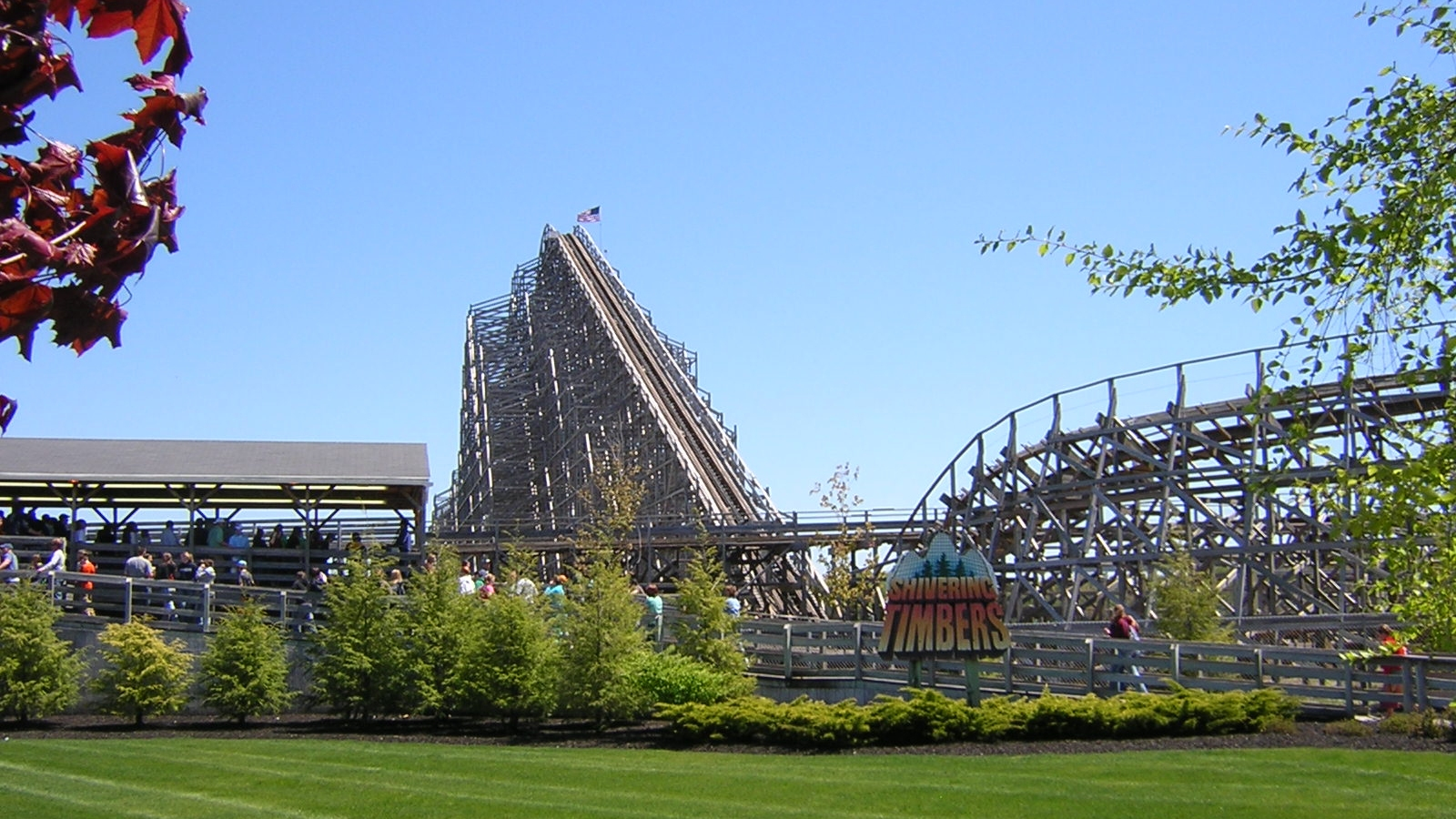
CCI's Shivering Timbers at Michigan's Adventure

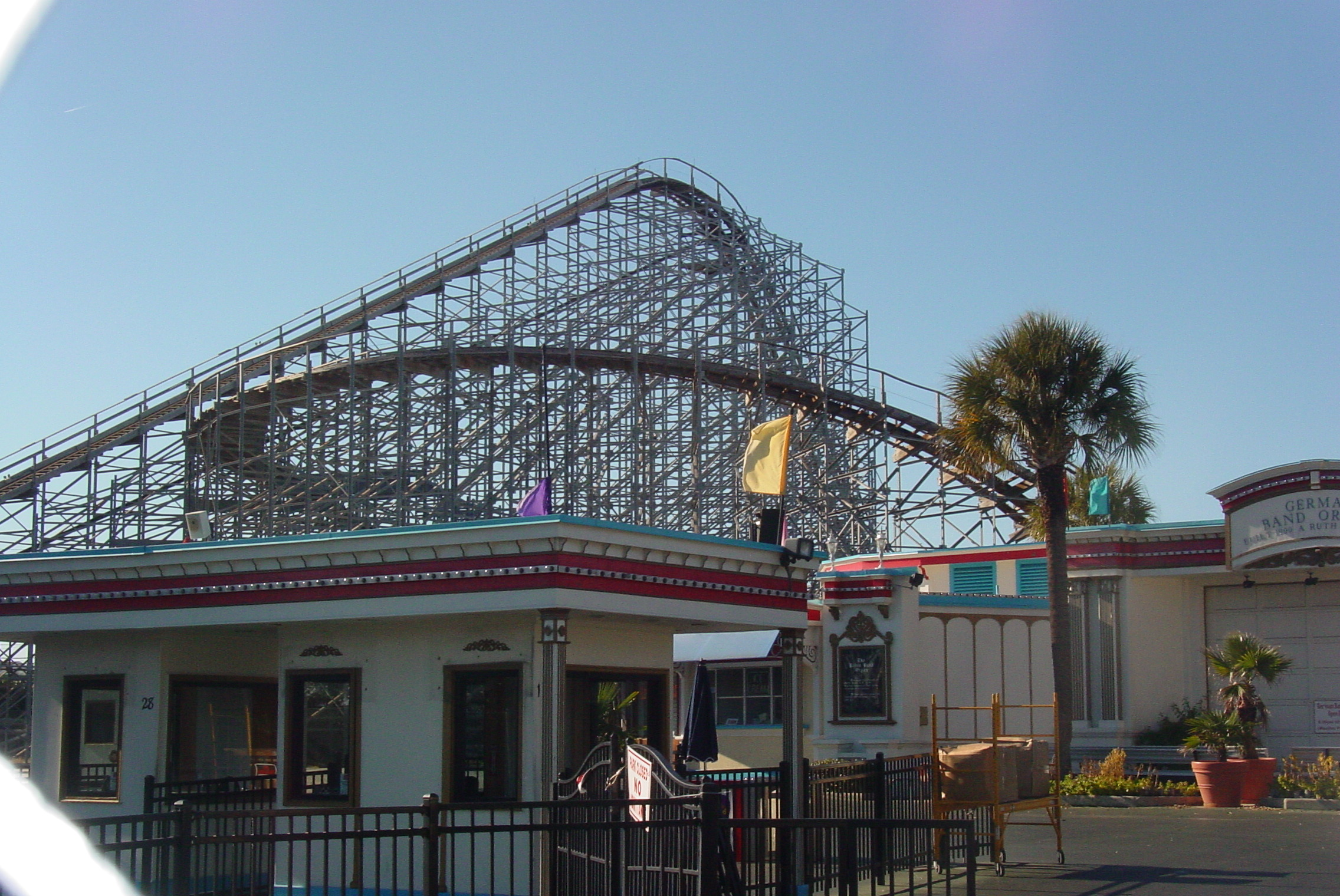
CCI's Hurricane at the Myrtle Beach Pavilion

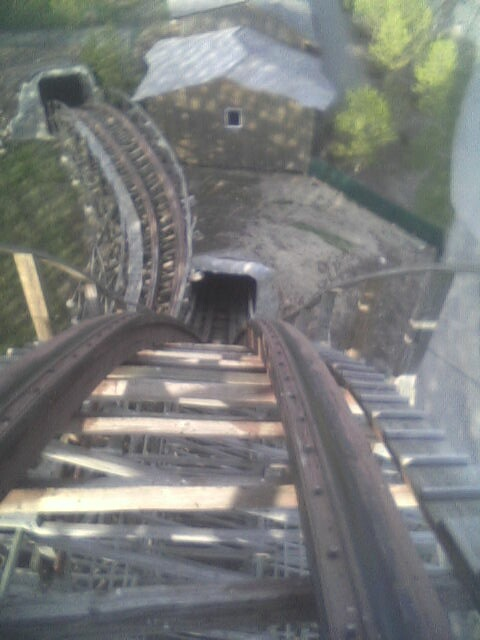
CCI's Tremors at Silverwood

Over the span of 11 years, Custom Coasters International had built 34 roller coasters around the world. As of 2019, 29 continue to operate, one is closed, two have been demolished, and two have been converted to steel roller coasters (Medusa to Medusa Steel Coaster and Twisted Twins to Wind Chaser) by Rocky Mountain Construction.

The roller coasters in the following table are listed in order of installation.

Name	Model	Park	Country	Opened	Status	Ref
Kingdom Coaster; Formerly Sky Princess	Wood Support Structure	Dutch Wonderland	United States	1992	Operating	
Outlaw	Wood Support Structure	Adventureland	United States	1993	Operating	
Hoosier Hurricane	Steel Support Structure	Indiana Beach	United States	1994	Operating	
Zach's Zoomer	Wood Support Structure	Michigan's Adventure	United States	1994	Operating	
Cyclops	Wood Support Structure	Mt. Olympus Water & Theme Park	United States	1995	Operating	
Cannonball Run	Wood Support Structure	Waterville USA	United States	1995	Removed	
The Raven	Wood Support Structure	Holiday World	United States	1995	Operating	
Timber Terror; Formerly Grizzly	Wood Support Structure	Silverwood Theme Park	United States	1996	Operating	
The Underground	Wood Support Structure	Adventureland	United States	1996	Operating	
Pegasus	Wood Support Structure	Mt. Olympus Water & Theme Park	United States	1996	Operating	
The Great White	Steel Support Structure	Morey's Piers	United States	1996	Operating	
Megafobia	Wood Support Structure	Oakwood Theme Park	United Kingdom	1996	Closed	
Tonnerre 2 Zeus; Formerly Tonnerre de Zeus	Wood Support Structure	Parc Astérix	France	1997	Operating	
Stampida	Wood Support Structure	PortAventura Park	Spain	1997	Operating	
Tomahawk	Wood Support Structure	PortAventura Park	Spain	1997	Operating	
Zeus	Wood Support Structure	Mt. Olympus Water & Theme Park	United States	1997	Operating	
Shivering Timbers	Wood Support Structure	Michigan's Adventure	United States	1998	Operating	
Rampage	Wood Support Structure	Alabama Splash Adventure	United States	1998	Operating	
Excalibur	Wood Support Structure	Funtown Splashtown USA	United States	1998	Operating	
Twisted Twins; Formerly Twisted Sisters	Steel Support Structure	Kentucky Kingdom	United States	1998	Converted; Now known as Wind Chaser	
GhostRider	Wood Support Structure	Knott's Berry Farm	United States	1998	Operating	
Silver Comet	Steel Support Structure	Niagara Amusement Park & Splash World	United States	1999	Operating	
Tremors	Wood Support Structure	Silverwood Theme Park	United States	1999	Operating	
The Boss	Wood Support Structure	Mid America Adventure	United States	2000	Operating	
Villain	Steel Support Structure	Geauga Lake	United States	2000	Removed	
The Legend	Wood Support Structure	Holiday World	United States	2000	Operating	
Hurricane	Steel Support Structure	Myrtle Beach Pavilion	United States	2000	Removed	
Mega Zeph	Steel Support Structure	Six Flags New Orleans	United States	2000	Removed	
Boulder Dash	Wood Support Structure	Lake Compounce	United States	2000	Operating	
Medusa	Wood Support Structure	Six Flags Mexico	Mexico	2000	Converted; Now known as Medusa Steel Coaster	
Cornball Express	Steel Support Structure	Indiana Beach	United States	2001	Operating	
Cheetah	Steel Support Structure	Wild Adventures	United States	2001	Removed	
Lost Coaster of Superstition Mountain	Steel Support Structure	Indiana Beach	United States	2002	Operating	
New Mexico Rattler	Steel Support Structure	Cliff's Amusement Park	United States	2002	Operating	
