= Hurricane: Category 5 =

Former roller coaster at Myrtle Beach Pavilion

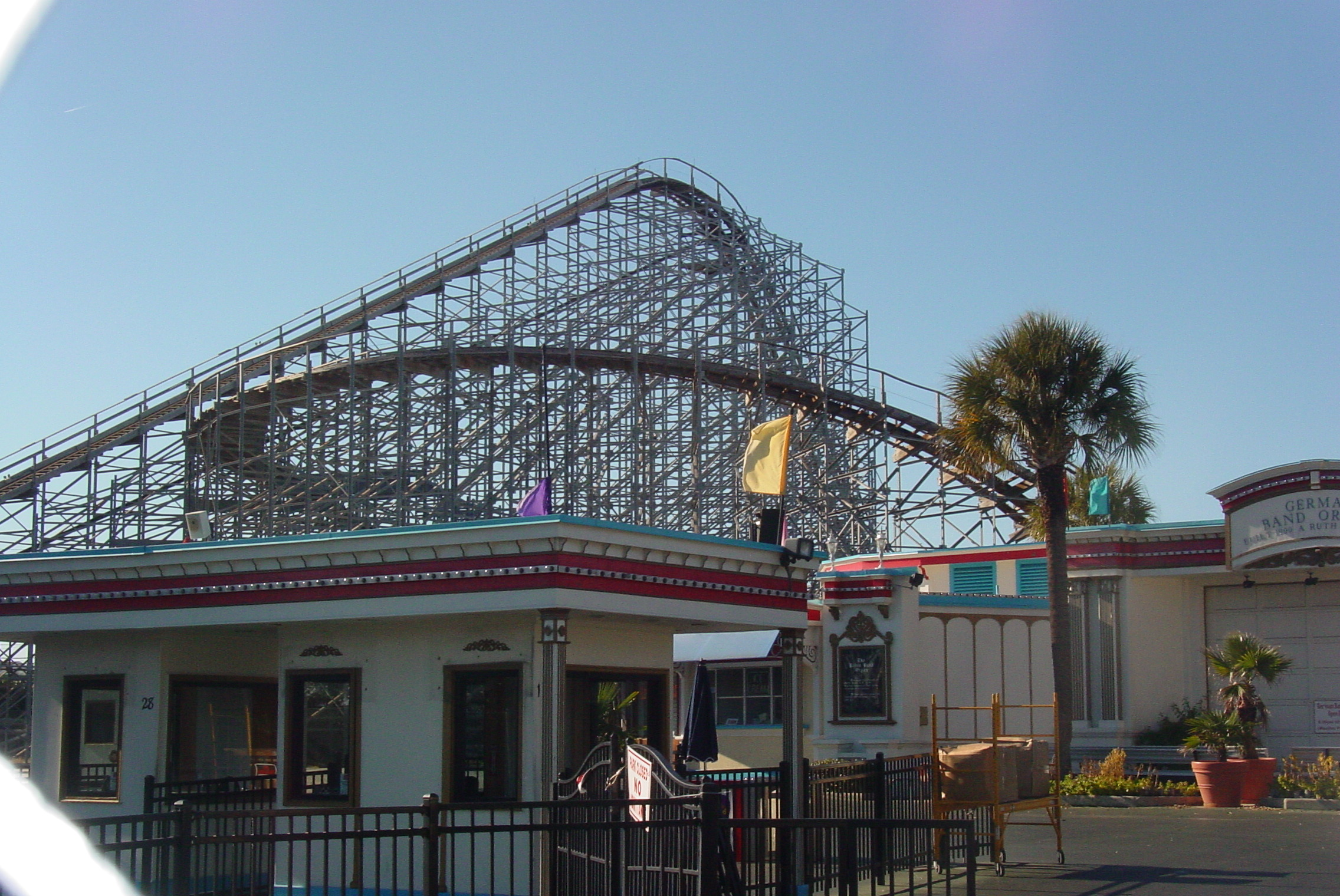

Myrtle Beach Pavilion
- Location: Myrtle Beach Pavilion
- Coordinates: 33.691751°N 78.881715°W
- Status: Removed
- Opening date: May 6, 2000
- Closing date: September 30, 2006
- Cost: $6,000,000 USD

General statistics
- Type: Wood
- Manufacturer: Custom Coasters International
- Designer: Dennis McNulty
- Model: Custom Hybrid
- Lift/launch system: Chain lift hill
- Height: 101 ft (31 m)
- Drop: 100 ft (30 m)
- Length: 3,800 ft (1,200 m)
- Speed: 55 mph (89 km/h)
- Duration: 2:00
- Max vertical angle: 53°
- G-force: 3
- Height restriction: 48 in (122 cm)
- Hurricane: Category 5 at RCDB

Hurricane: Category 5 was a hybrid wooden roller coaster located at Myrtle Beach Pavilion in Myrtle Beach, South Carolina. It opened on May 6, 2000, and was built by Custom Coasters International. It replaced the Corkscrew roller coaster, which had previously operated on the site from 1978 to 1999.

Hurricane held the record for being the tallest, fastest, and longest wooden roller coaster in South Carolina. The ride operated until September 30, 2006, when it closed for good alongside the rest of the park.

Although Burroughs & Chapin attempted to sell the ride along with the Haunted Hotel, log flume, Treasure Hunt, and a few other rides, it was deemed too expensive a task to dismantle and relocate the ride, and it was ultimately demolished in March 2007. The only part of the ride not demolished were its two Gerstlauer trains, which were purchased by Kings Island in Mason, Ohio for use on Son of Beast, which was at the time the world's tallest and fastest wooden roller coaster. Son of Beast was later demolished in 2012, following an incident that occurred in 2009.
