= Shivering Timbers =

Roller coaster at Michigan's Adventure

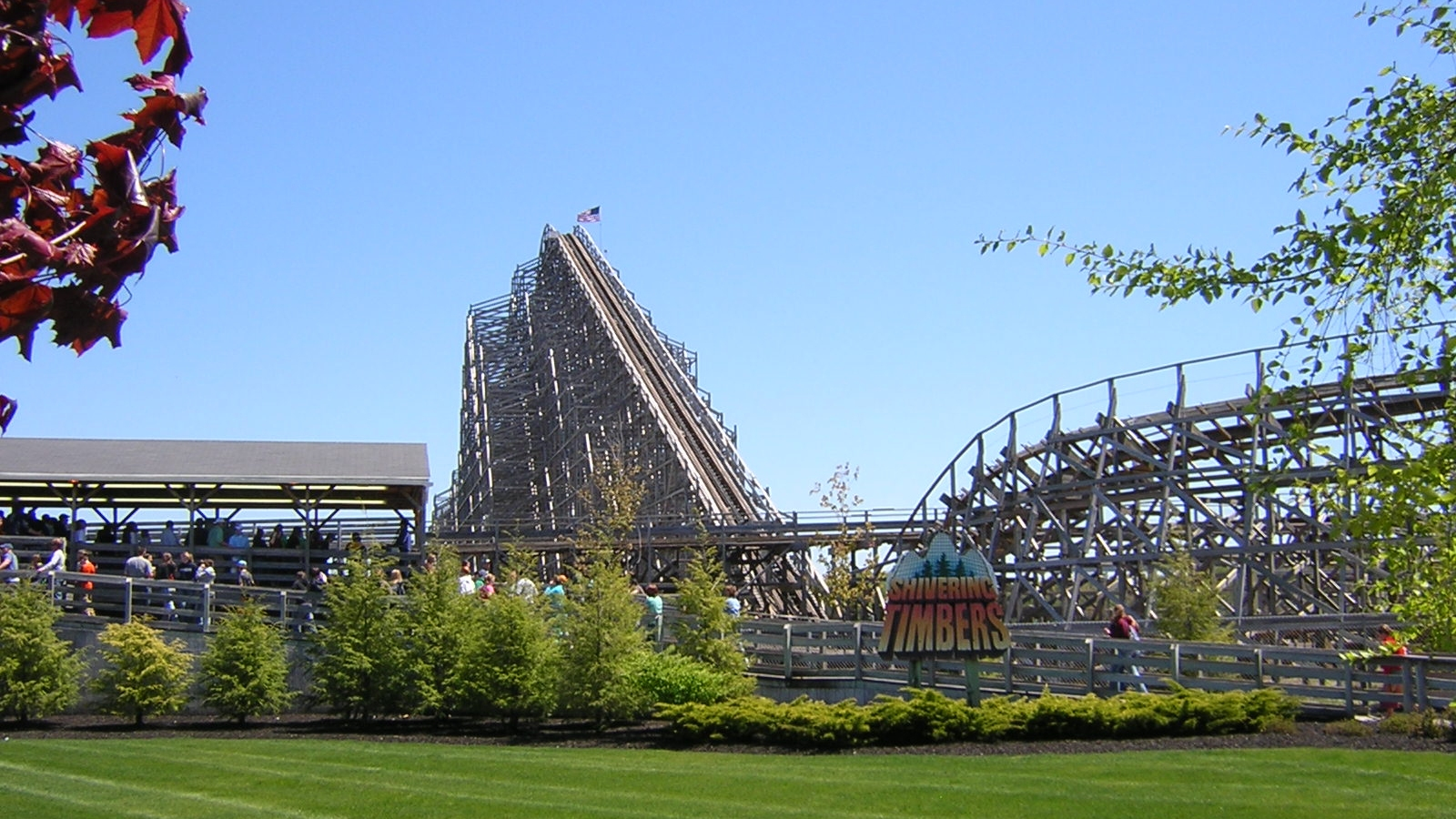
- The ride seen from the midway

Michigan's Adventure
- Location: Michigan's Adventure
- Coordinates: 43°20′32″N 86°16′34″W
- Status: Operating
- Opening date: May 23, 1998
- Cost: $4.5 million

General statistics
- Type: Wood
- Manufacturer: Custom Coasters International
- Track layout: Out-and-back
- Lift/launch system: Chain lift hill
- Height: 122 ft (37 m)
- Length: 5,383 ft (1,641 m)
- Speed: 57 mph (92 km/h)
- Duration: 2:30
- Max vertical angle: 53.3°
- Height restriction: 48 in (122 cm)
- Trains: 2 trains with 6 cars; riders arranged 2 across in 2 rows for a total of 24 riders per train
- Fast Lane available
- Shivering Timbers at RCDB

The ride in 2012

Shivering Timbers is a hybrid wooden roller coaster at Michigan's Adventure in Muskegon, Michigan. It was designed by Custom Coasters International, and opened in 1998.

The ride's trains were made by Philadelphia Toboggan Coasters. The ride's out-and-back layout is 5,383 feet (1,641 m) long, making it the fourth-longest wooden roller coaster in the world.

== Ride experience ==
The ride begins with a left turn out of the station onto the 122 feet (37 m) lift hill. Upon descending the first drop, the train reaches its maximum speed of 57 mph (92 km/h). Following the first drop are two camelback airtime hills. The train then jumps a bunny hop, another camelback hill, and a double-up, before turning 180° for the second half of its course. After the turnaround, the train traverses another bunny hop and another double-up. This is followed by a series of six bunny hop hills. After the last hill, there is an on-ride photo taken before the ride's finale, a 630° counterclockwise helix. After the helix, the train enters brake run before returning to the station in a u-turn.

== Rankings ==
Shivering Timbers has been consistently ranked among the best wooden roller coasters in Amusement Today magazine's Golden Ticket Awards.

Golden Ticket Awards: Top wood Roller Coasters
Year									1998	1999
Ranking									–	4
Year	2000	2001	2002	2003	2004	2005	2006	2007	2008	2009
Ranking	2	2	2	2	2	3	6	6	7	10
Year	2010	2011	2012	2013	2014	2015	2016	2017	2018	2019
Ranking	11	9	9	10	15	20	19	25	21 (tie)	15
Year	2020	2021	2022	2023	2024	2025	2026			
Ranking	N/A	21	19	17	16	16	22			

NAPHA Survey: Favorite Wood Roller Coaster
Year	2006
Ranking	3
