= Mega Zeph =

Former roller coaster

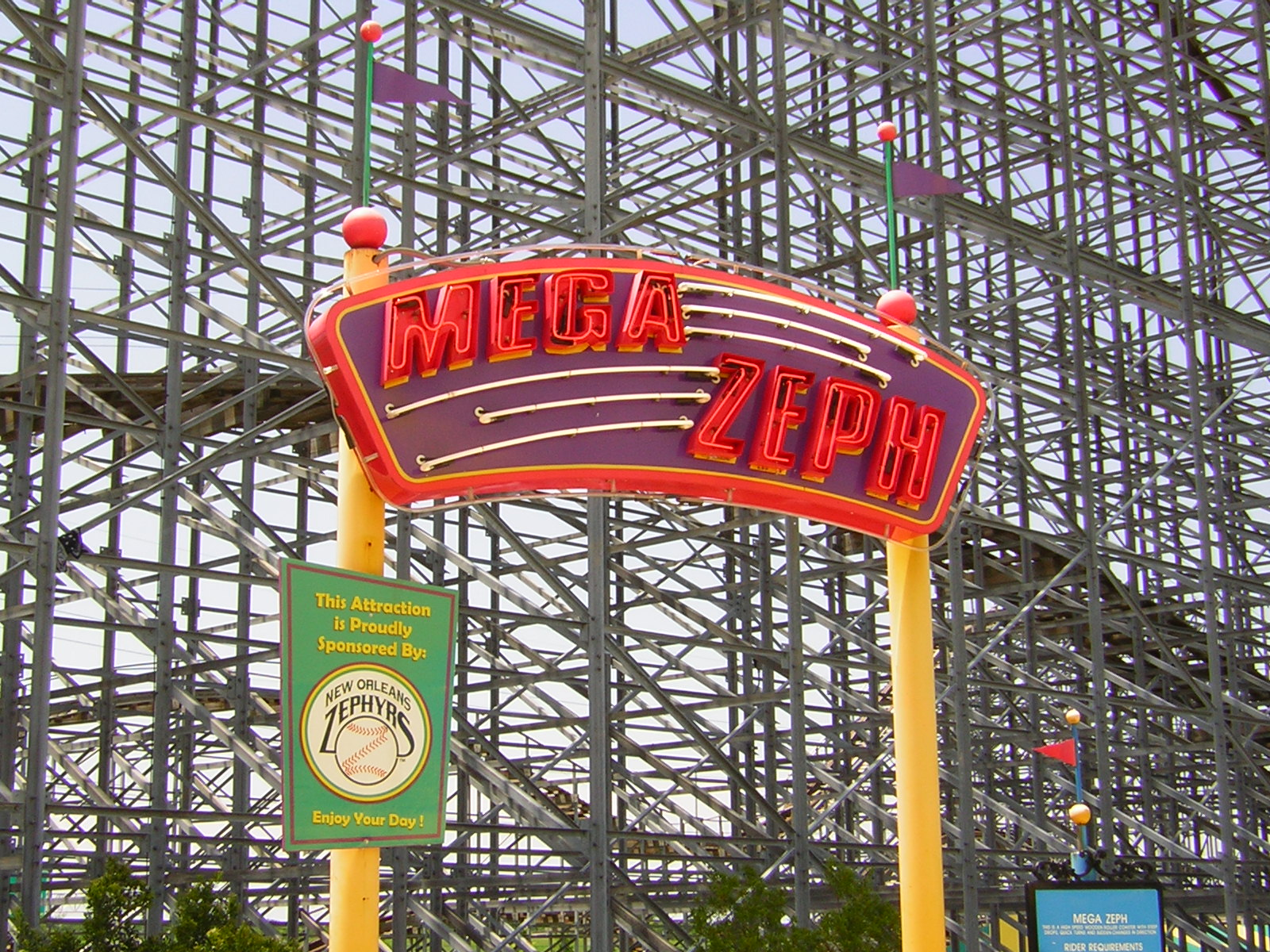
- The entrance of the Mega Zeph roller coaster.

Six Flags New Orleans
- Location: Six Flags New Orleans
- Park section: Mardi Gras
- Coordinates: 30.053147°N 89.937486°W
- Status: Removed
- Opening date: May 20, 2000
- Closing date: August 21, 2005

General statistics
- Type: Wood
- Manufacturer: Custom Coasters International
- Lift/launch system: Chain lift hill
- Height: 110 ft (34 m)
- Length: 4,000 ft (1,200 m)
- Speed: 57 mph (92 km/h)
- Inversions: 0
- Height restriction: 48 in (122 cm)
- Trains: 2 trains with 6 cars. Riders are arranged 2 across in 2 rows for a total of 24 riders per train.
- Mega Zeph at RCDB

Mega Zeph was a wooden roller coaster located at the now demolished Six Flags New Orleans theme park, in the Eastern New Orleans area of New Orleans, Louisiana, United States. Originally opening on May 20, 2000, as Jazzland's signature ride. Following the devastation to the amusement park in August 2005 by Hurricane Katrina, the roller coaster ceased operation following the park's closure but remained standing until its demolition in 2025.

== History ==
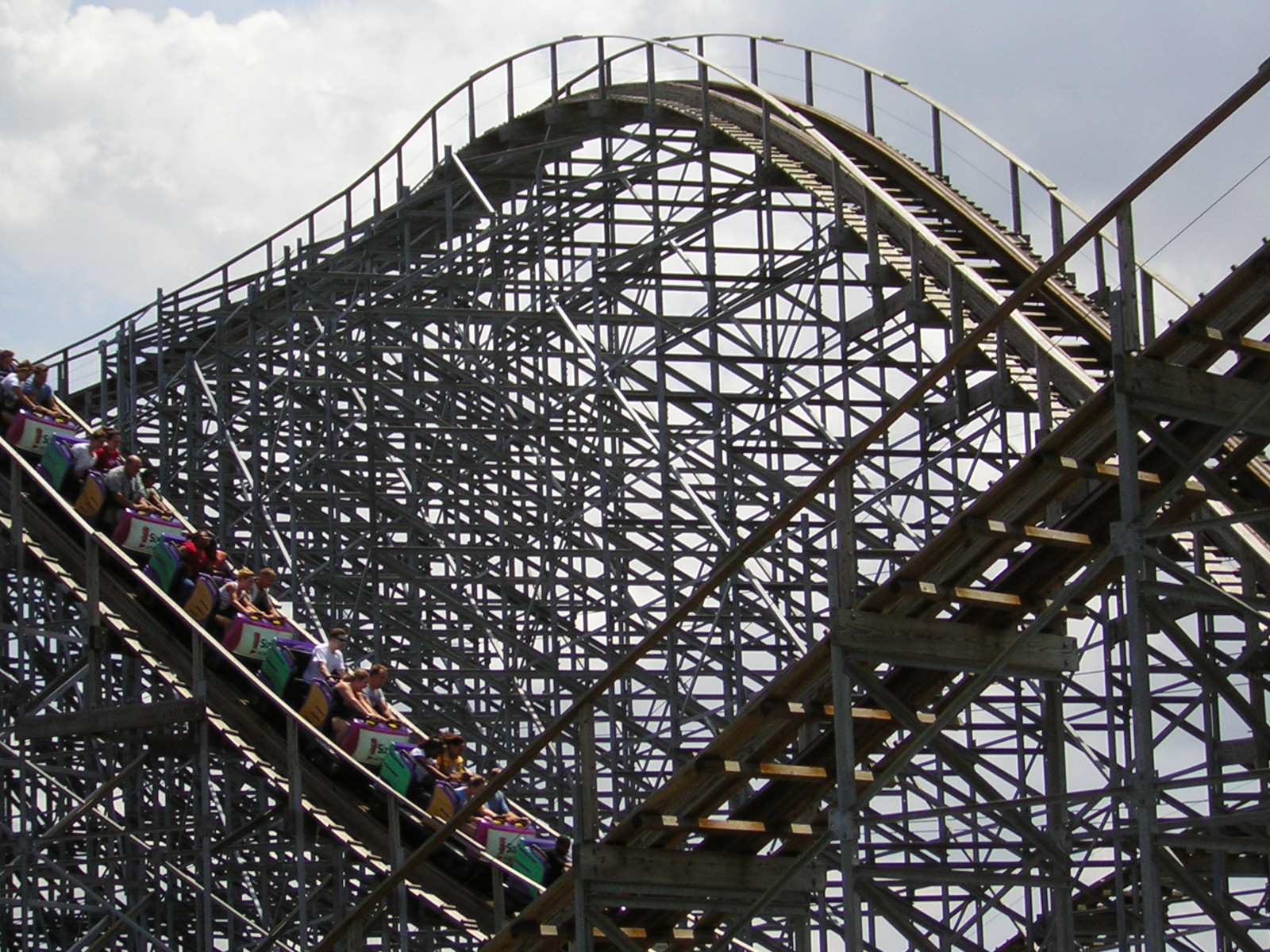
One of the Mega Zeph trains going down a hill.

Mega Zeph takes its name from the original Zephyr or Big Zephyr coaster that operated in the now-defunct Pontchartrain Beach amusement park. The coaster celebrated its topping out ceremony on September 10, 1999, with the installation of the underpinnings of the coaster's highest hump. At the time of its completion, Mega Zeph served as both Jazzland's signature attraction as well as its most visible due to its location adjacent to the Interstate 10/Interstate 510 interchange. The coaster's opening would coincide with the grand opening of Jazzland on May 20, 2000.

=== After Hurricane Katrina ===
Shuttered since August 2005 due to severe flooding in the park as a result of Hurricane Katrina, the park has remained closed. In 2007, Six Flags was in the process of removing some of its rides. The first ride to leave was Batman: The Ride, which was removed and taken to Six Flags Fiesta Texas, where it was refurbished and reopened as Goliath on April 18, 2008. Bayou Blaster and Sonic Slam were removed and taken to Great Escape in Queensbury, New York, where it was refurbished and reopened as Sasquatch on May 10, 2009. The final ride to leave Six Flags New Orleans was the Road Runner Express, which was removed in 2009 and taken to Six Flags Magic Mountain, where it was refurbished and reopened on May 28, 2011 under the same name. Until its demolition in 2025, the Mega Zeph remained unused since the park's closure in August 2005. A large section on the Mega Zeph track completely fell to the ground due to the decaying of the wood. The majority of the wood from Mega Zeph decayed and the steel track had severely rusted. Also, the only train was sent to Six Flags St. Louis. They are now in storage under Batman: The Ride.

Mega Zeph was featured in the 20th Century Fox film Percy Jackson: Sea of Monsters along with several other rides including Ozarka Splash, released August 16, 2013. Mega Zeph was lined with lights along the coaster and resurrected just enough to have a car zoom in and out of frame during the shooting of the film. In the film, Six Flags New Orleans portrayed the park Circeland on the island of Polyphemus, that was built by the goddess Circe, only to be destroyed by the cyclops Polyphemus.

The National Roller Coaster Museum and Archives was able to preserve the neon sign from the ride's entrance at its facility in Plainview, TX.

On January 18, 2025, a section of the coaster caught fire, though the fire posed no threat to safety. On February 2, 2025, the coaster was torn down.

== Ride layout ==
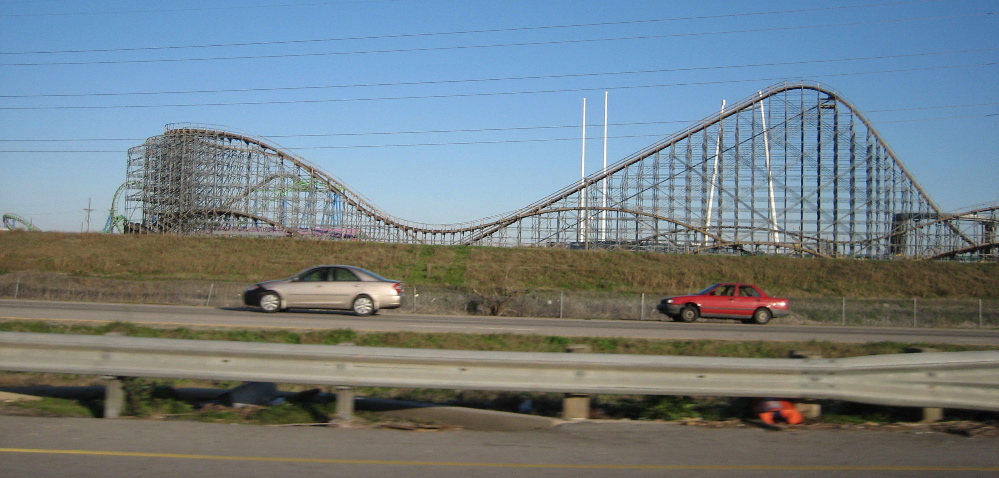
View from Paris Road Highway

After passengers left the station, passengers climbed a 110-foot (34 m) lift hill culminating in its first drop. The train then made a quick descent towards a high speed turnaround near the lake's edge. The physical construction of the ride is unique in that it consisted of steel construction with a wooden track.
