= Megafobia =

Former wooden roller coaster at Oakwood Theme Park

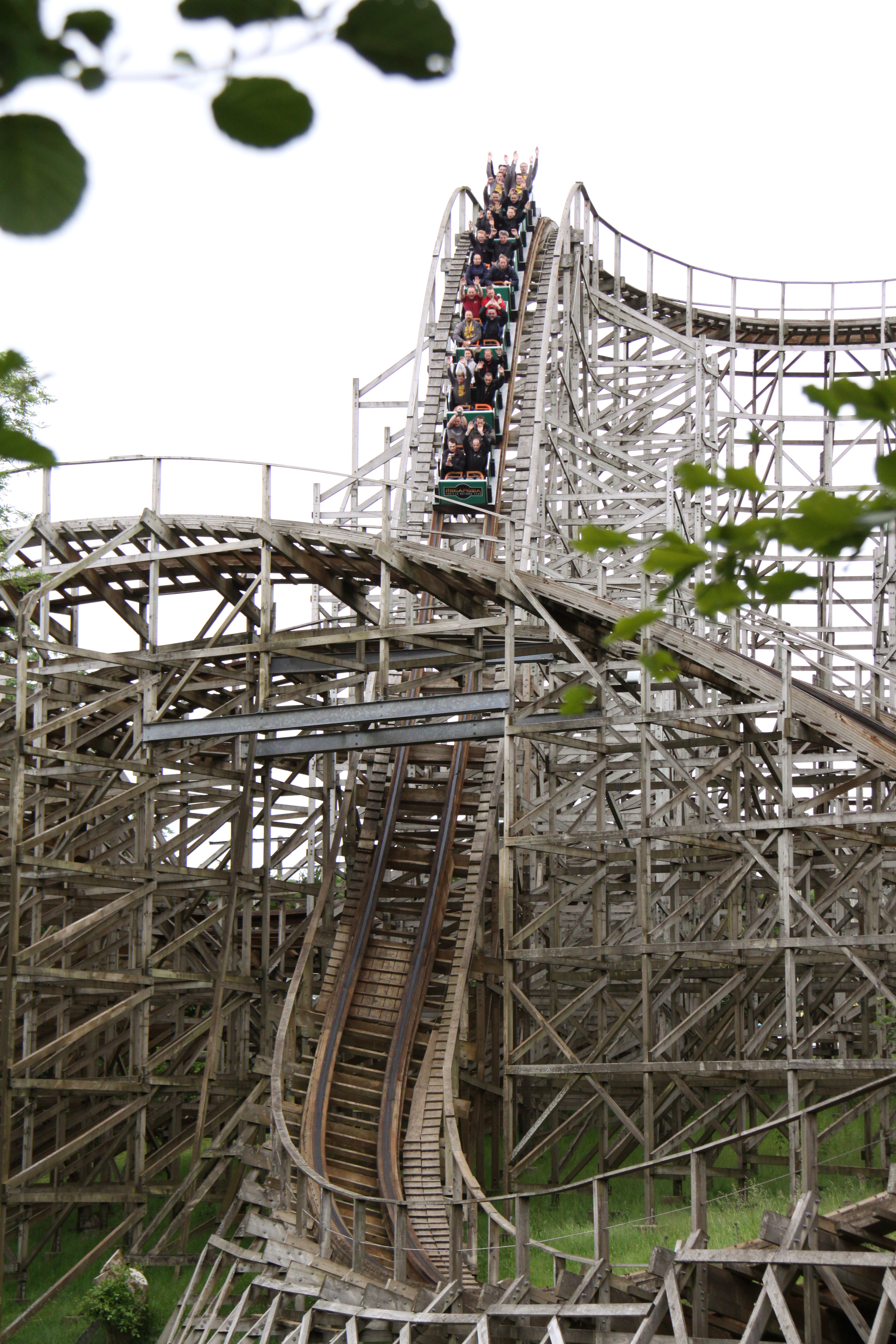
- Megafobia

Oakwood Theme Park
- Location: Oakwood Theme Park
- Coordinates: 51.7807°N 4.8056°W
- Status: Closed
- Opening date: April 1996
- Closing date: 3 November 2024

General statistics
- Type: Wood
- Manufacturer: Custom Coasters International
- Designer: John Wardley, Dennis McNulty, Larry Bill
- Height: 85 ft (26 m)
- Length: 2,956 ft (901 m)
- Speed: 48 mph (77 km/h)
- Inversions: 0
- Duration: 1:40
- Max vertical angle: 55°
- G-force: 2.75
- Height restriction: 120 cm (3 ft 11 in)
- Megafobia at RCDB

Megafobia was a wooden roller coaster located at Oakwood Theme Park in Pembrokeshire, Wales. It opened in April 1996 and was built by Custom Coasters International, who wanted a ride to showcase their company's work in Europe. It was designed by John Wardley, Dennis McNulty, and Larry Bill. It operated until 3 November 2024.

Megafobia was the first major attraction to be installed at Oakwood Theme Park. It was the most recent wooden roller coaster to be built in the United Kingdom until the opening of Wicker Man at Alton Towers in 2018.

On 27 January 2023, the park announced that Megafobia would undergo a £1.5 million replacement of its track by The Gravity Group, a project that replaced around 40% of the track and re-profiled certain elements of the layout. Most notably, the first drop became steeper. The updated ride re-opened to the public on 17 July 2023.

On 4 March 2025 it was announced that Oakwood Theme Park and all its rides would be closing indefinitely, with park owner Aspro Parks citing "challenges presented by the current business environment", and a decline in financial performance "making further investment unsustainable".

== Statistics ==
The ride was 26 metres (85 ft) tall, and reached top speeds of 77 km/h (48 mph). It was 901 metres (2,956 ft) long, and had a maximum vertical angle of 55 degrees. It exerted a maximum of 2.65 Gs on riders.

The ride had two trains which were built by Philadelphia Toboggan Coasters. The trains had six cars that seated four riders in two rows of two each, for a total of 24 riders per train.

== Ride experience ==
Upon dispatch from the station, the train made a left turn into a small dip before climbing the 26 metre (85 ft) tall chain lift hill. At the top, the track made a 180-degree left turn, before the train descended the first drop. The first drop passed through the support structure, which was followed by a sweeping left curve and an airtime hill which crossed over the lift hill. After this airtime hill, the track made a 180-degree left turn back towards the lift hill. An on-ride camera was situated at the exit of this turn. The track turned towards the lift hill again, traversing another airtime hill. The track then made a three-quarter right turn that passed through the lift hill's structure. Immediately following this, the train passed through another airtime hill and crossed over the exit from the first turnaround before turning in a 180-degree right turn and drop. The track weaved under itself and traced back along the earlier pass through the lift hill structure before making a drop and turn to the right. After passing under the second hill, the track made a final right turn and another drop before entering the brake run. Trains then passed through the transfer track and storage area before returning to the station. A full ride experience on Megafobia lasted approximately one minute and 40 seconds.

== Awards ==
Megafobia was consistently rated among the top wooden coasters in the Golden Ticket Awards by Amusement Today.

Golden Ticket Awards: Top wood Roller Coasters
Year									1998	1999
Ranking									5	10
Year	2000	2001	2002	2003	2004	2005	2006	2007	2008	2009
Ranking	9	10	9	9	14	13	24	25	22	25
Year	2010	2011	2012	2013	2014	2015	2016	2017	2018	2019
Ranking	30	20	27	30	33	27	35	–	46	44
Year	2020	2021	2022	2023	2024	2025	2026			
Ranking	N/A	–	–	–	–	–	–			

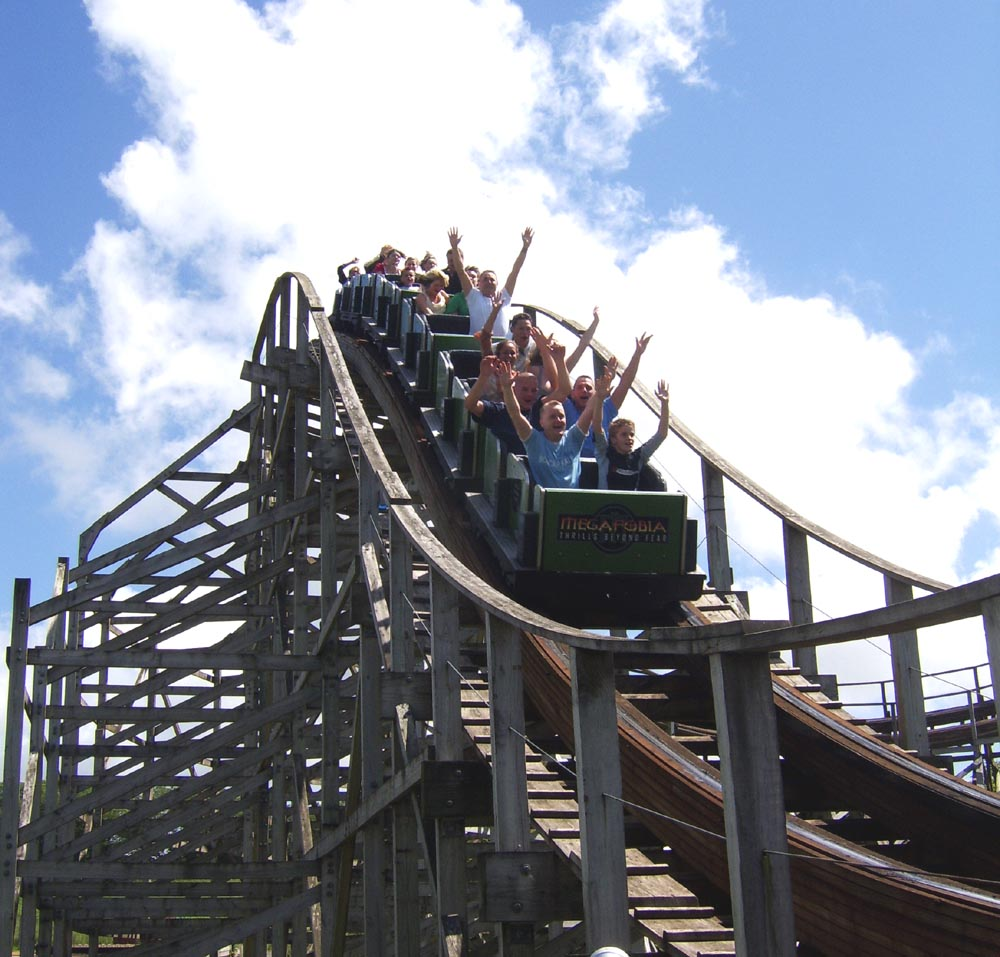
