= Wooden roller coaster =

Type of roller coaster

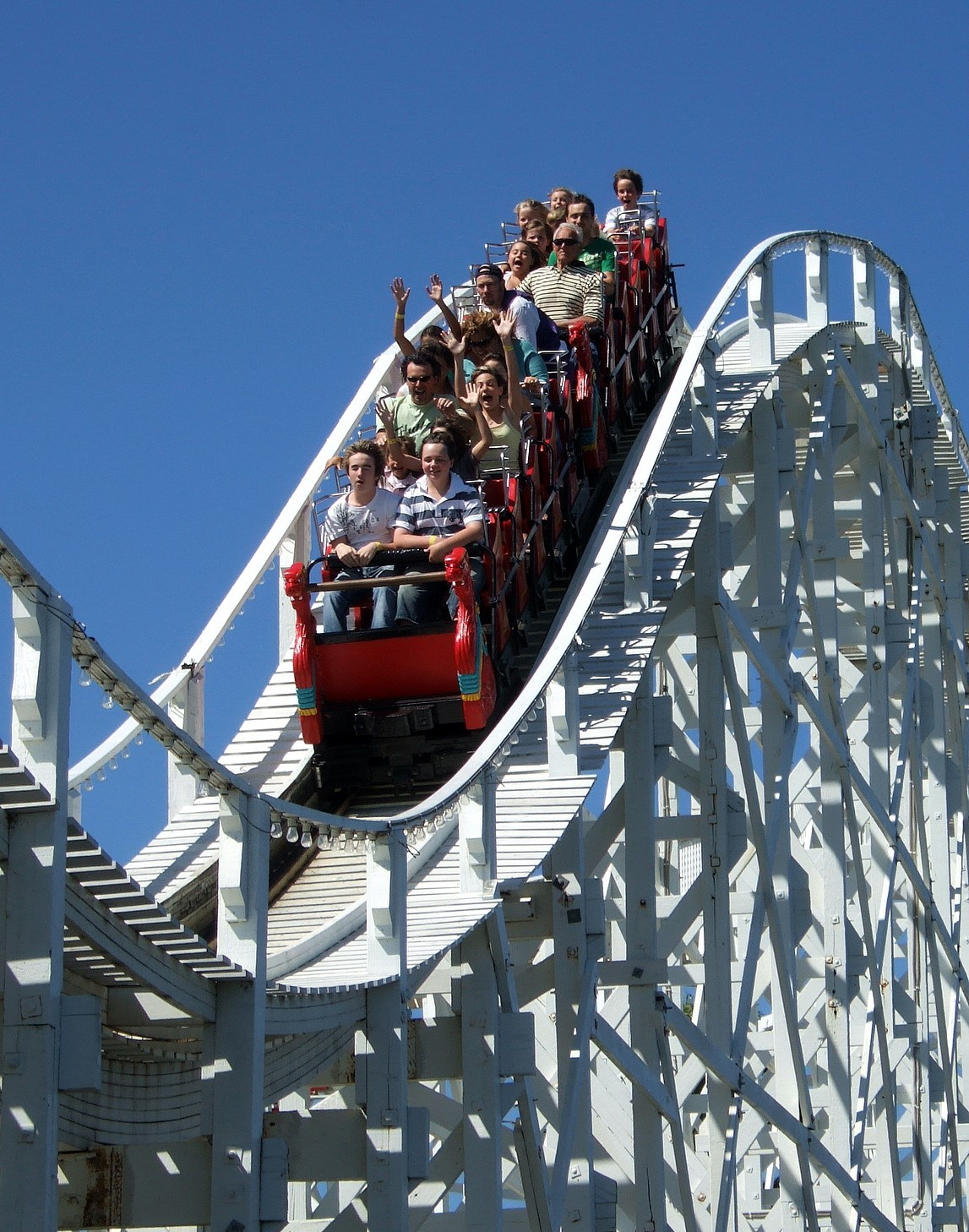
Scenic Railway at Luna Park, Melbourne

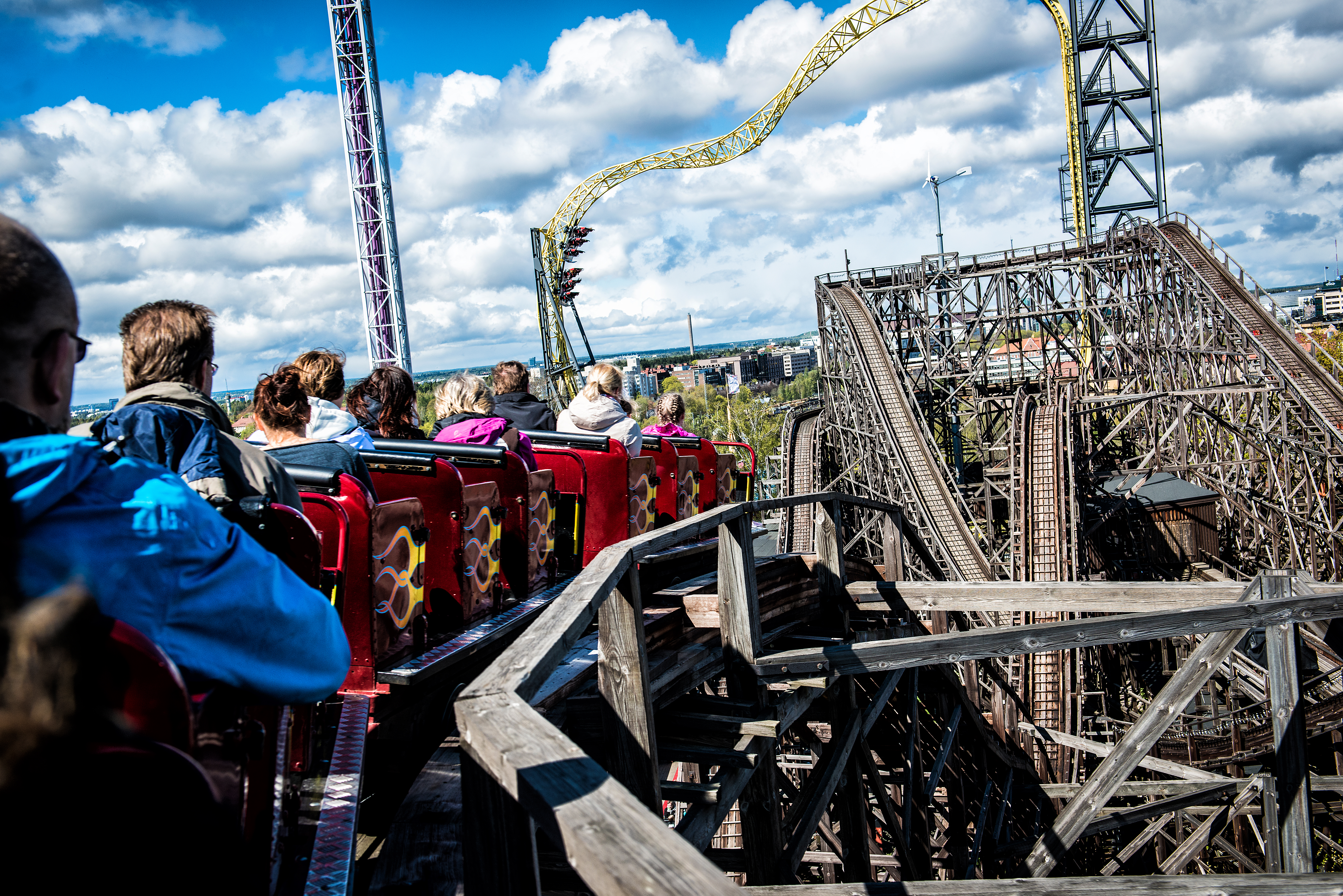
Vuoristorata at Linnanmäki amusement park in Helsinki, Finland is the oldest wooden roller coaster in the country; it opened in 1951 and is still in operation.

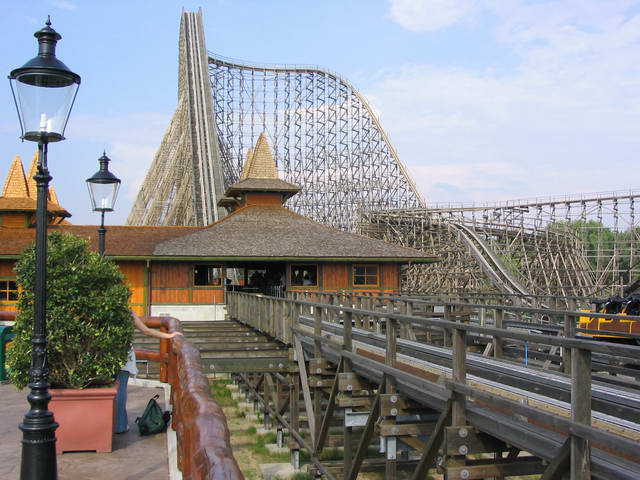
Colossos, one of the world's largest wooden roller coasters at Heide Park, Germany

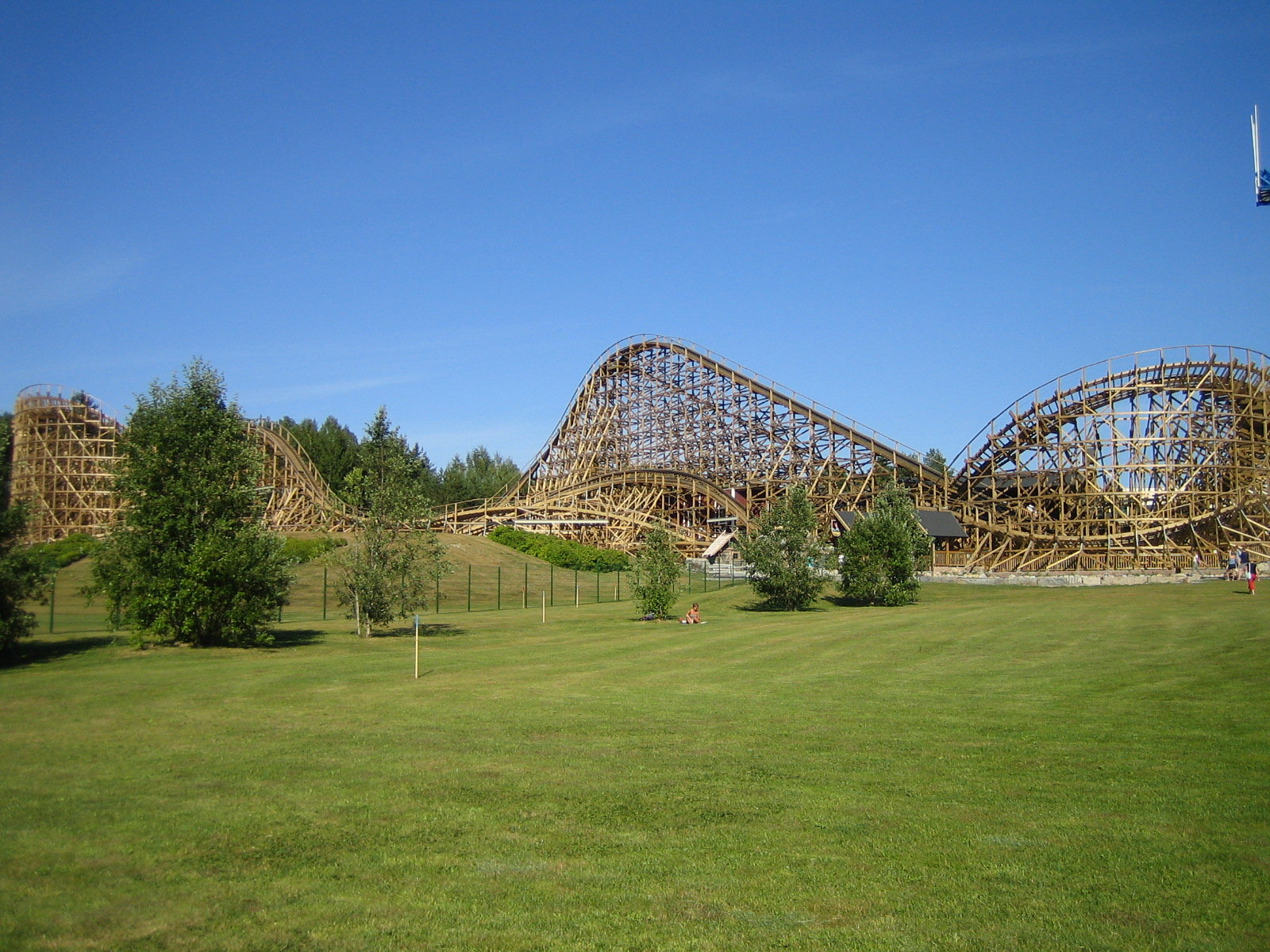
Thunderbird in the PowerPark amusement park

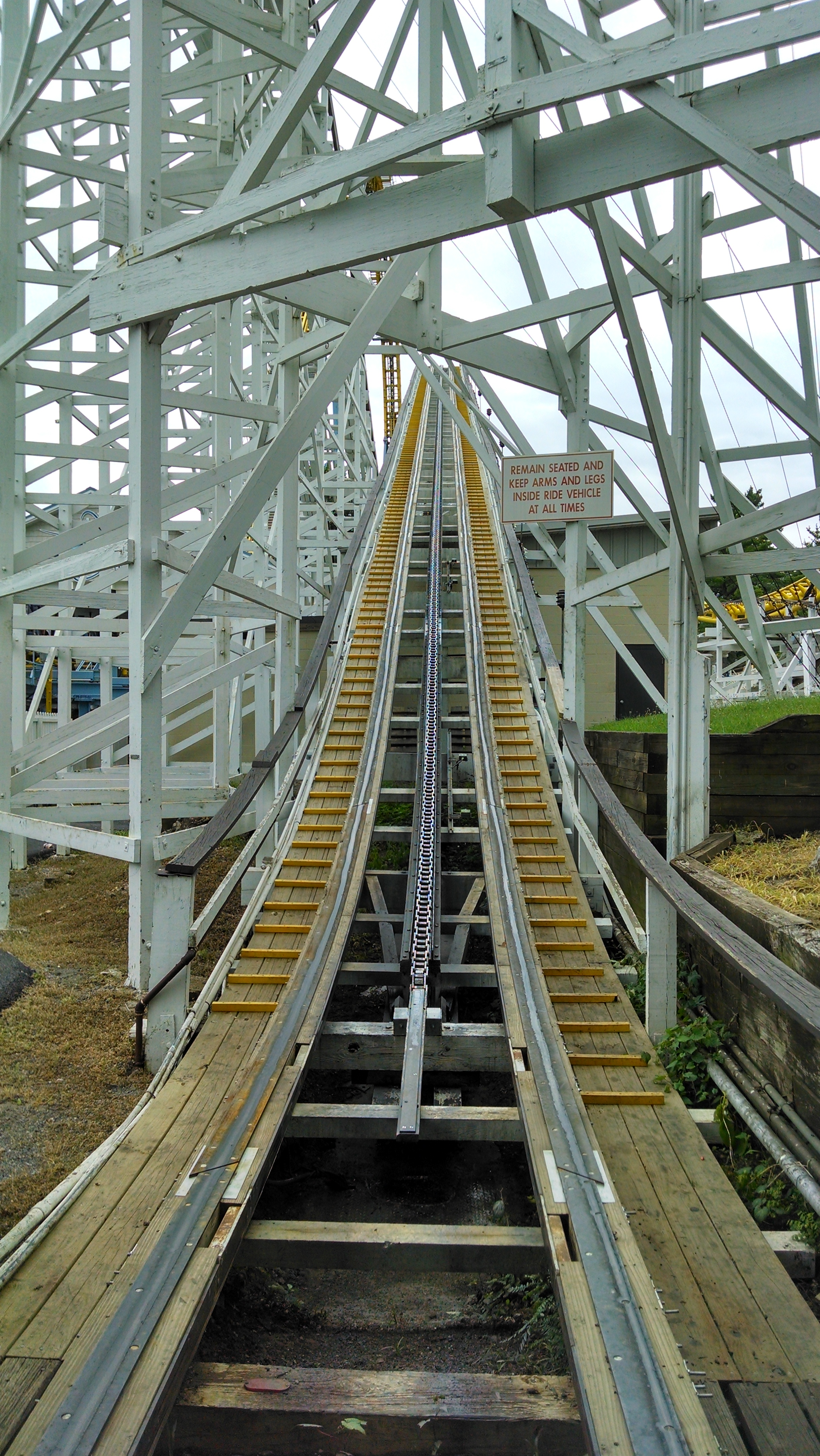
The lift hill on Hersheypark's Comet

A wooden roller coaster is a type of roller coaster classified by its wooden track, which consists of running rails made of flat steel strips mounted on laminated wood. The support structure is also typically made of wood, but may also be made of steel lattice or truss, which has no bearing on a wooden coaster's classification. The type of wood often selected in the construction of wooden coasters worldwide is southern yellow pine, which grows abundantly in the southern United States, due to its density and adherence to different forms of pressure treatment.

Early wooden roller coaster designs of the 19th century featured a single set of wheels running on top of the track, which was common in scenic railway rides. John A. Miller introduced side friction coasters and later underfriction coasters in the early 20th century, which added additional sets of wheels running along multiple sides of the track to allow for more intense ride design with sharper turns and steeper drops. The underfriction design became commonplace and continues to be used in modern roller coaster design.

Traditionally, wooden roller coasters were not capable of featuring extreme elements such as inversions, near-vertical drops, and overbanked turns commonly found on steel roller coasters after the introduction of tubular steel track by Arrow Development in 1959. Son of Beast at Kings Island made history in 2000 by incorporating the first successful attempt of an inversion on a wooden coaster, a vertical loop made of steel. A decade later, the introduction of Topper Track by Rocky Mountain Construction allowed for new possibilities, with corkscrews, overbanked turns, and other inverting elements appearing on wooden coasters such as Outlaw Run at Silver Dollar City and Goliath at Six Flags Great America.

== History ==
The Dragon Coaster at Playland Park in Rye, New York with a lift hill and a tunnel

=== Early 20th century ===
The 1920s are generally considered the Golden Age of coaster design. This was the decade when many of the world's most iconic coasters were built. Some of these include the Giant Dipper at the Santa Cruz Beach Boardwalk and its counterpart at Belmont Park, the Cyclone at Coney Island, the Big Dipper at Geauga Lake, The Thriller at Euclid Beach Park, and the Roller Coaster at Lagoon. All of these rides were built during this time. The decade was also the design peak for some of the world's greatest coaster designers, including John A. Miller, Harry Traver, Herb Schmeck, and the partnership of Prior and Church. Many wooden roller coasters of this time were demolished during the Great Depression, but a few still stand as American Coaster Enthusiasts (ACE) classics and landmarks.

=== 1970s and 1989s ===
This relatively quiet age of coaster design following the Great Depression was brought to an end by The Racer at Kings Island, which opened in 1972 and sparked a second "Golden Age" of wooden coaster design. After their success with the Racer at Kings Island, the Philadelphia Toboggan Company (PTC) constructed another 9 roller coasters over the next decade. About half were small family coasters, two were racing coasters similar to the Racer, and two were out and back coasters with custom designs. One of these, Screamin' Eagle at Six Flags St. Louis, was the last coaster designed by John Allen before his retirement. After these coasters, PTC stopped producing roller coasters, but continues to produce wooden roller coaster trains as Philadelphia Toboggan Coasters. Their distinctive rectangular cars are widely used on wooden coasters around the world.

A notable non-PTC coaster built during this time was The Beast at Kings Island. After John Allen refused to design the coaster in lieu of retirement, Kings Island built the coaster themselves, with the coaster designed by Al Collins and Jeff Gramke and construction overseen by Charlie Dinn. Rather than a typical out and back layout, the coaster sprawled over the woods at the back of the park, using the terrain to create an elevation change from lowest to highest point of 201 feet, even though the coaster was only 118 feet tall. The coaster also had two lift hills which, while common for mine train coasters at the time, was uncommon for wooden coasters. Opening in 1979, the coaster was, and still is, the longest wooden roller coaster in the world at 7,361 feet. Another significant wooden coaster of this era was the racing American Eagle at (now) Six Flags Great America, built by Intamin in 1981, which still holds the records for racing wooden coasters of height (127 ft), length (4650 ft), speed (66 mph), and drop (147 ft).

After the surge in the 1970s, wooden coasters construction became stagnant due to the steel roller coaster being much more popular. Most original coasters during this time were designed by William Cobb, such as Monstre at La Ronde. Another trend during the 1980s was relocating old wooden coasters in danger of being destroyed. Charlie Dinn, who formed Dinn Corporation after leaving Kings Island in 1984, oversaw some of these relocations, including the relocation of The Rocket from Playland Park to Knoebels Amusement Resort in Pennsylvania. It now operates as the Phoenix and is ranked highly on wooden coaster polls.

In 1988, Charlie Dinn started a partnership with Curtis D. Summers to design and build new wooden coasters. Between 1988 and 1991, they designed and built ten new wooden coasters. While most were of typical wooden coaster size, a few set coaster records. Hercules at Dorney Park & Wildwater Kingdom, built in 1989, had the tallest wooden coaster drop at 150 feet. Texas Giant at Six Flags Over Texas and Mean Streak at Cedar Point were large wooden coasters with similar layouts, with the later opening as the tallest wooden coaster in the world at 161 feet. After a dispute during construction of Pegasus at Efteling, Dinn Corporation closed down and the partnership ended.

=== Custom Coasters International (1990s) ===
Custom Coasters International was formed in 1991 by Denise Dinn-Larrick (daughter of Charlie Dinn), her brother Jeff Dinn, and her husband Randy Larrick. After the closure of Dinn Corporation, several other designers joined CCI. The company's first coaster, Kingdom Coaster at Dutch Wonderland, was a small family coaster that stood only 55 feet high. As time went on, they began to design larger coasters. One of their earlier coasters that was well received was The Raven at Holiday World. Custom Coasters took on increasingly high numbers of wooden coaster projects, including 7 coasters in 2000 alone (The Boss at Six Flags St. Louis, which was the largest with a 153-foot drop and almost a mile of track; Medusa at Six Flags Mexico; Mega Zeph at the defunct Six Flags New Orleans; Boulder Dash at Lake Compounce; Villain at the defunct Geauga Lake; Hurricane: Category 5 at the defunct Myrtle Beach Pavilion; and The Legend at Holiday World).

CCI's coaster designs included both out and back layouts like Hoosier Hurricane at Indiana Beach as well as more twisted layouts like Megafobia at Oakwood Theme Park. Megafobia was also the company's first coaster outside the United States. CCI coasters were also unique at the time for sometimes featuring angle iron support structures rather than wooden beams (the track remains the same as other wooden coasters). Most CCI coasters ran Philadelphia Toboggan Company trains, although some, like The Boss at Six Flags St. Louis, run trains from the German manufacturer Gerstlauer.

In 2002, Custom Coasters declared bankruptcy while building the New Mexico Rattler at Cliff's Amusement Park. The company left a significant legacy on the coaster industry. The high number of wooden coasters they constructed, 34 over their decade of operation, helped to rekindle interest in the wooden roller coasters and allowed modern wooden coaster designers to thrive. Designers from CCI went on to form modern wooden coaster design firms, like Great Coasters International, The Gravity Group, and the wooden coaster department at S&S Worldwide. Many of their coasters rank highly in wooden coaster polls, including Shivering Timbers at Michigan's Adventure and Boulder Dash at Lake Compounce. In 2013, Boulder Dash was rated the number one wooden roller coaster in the world by Amusement Today.

=== 21st century ===
Great Coasters International (GCI) was formed in 1994 by Mike Boodley and Clair Hain, Jr, the former of whom was a designer at Custom Coasters prior to GCI. The first coaster was Wildcat at Hersheypark which opened in 1996. Since then, they have become one of the major wooden coaster designers in the industry, with award-winning coasters like Lightning Racer at Hersheypark and Thunderhead at Dollywood. GCI's coasters feature highly twisted layouts with many crossovers, and usually use GCI's own wooden coaster trains called Millennium Flyers. Their designs are inspired by coasters from the 1920s, specifically those by Fred Church and Harry Traver, and the company focuses on making the structures of their coasters aesthetically appealing and artistic.

In 2001, Swiss steel coaster designer Intamin began producing wooden roller coasters using prefabricated track. Their wooden coasters are known for large amounts of airtime (including ejector airtime), smooth ride experiences, and steep drops. T Express in Everland is currently the tallest wooden coaster in the world at 183 feet tall. While only having built 4 wooden coasters, all are praised by coaster enthusiasts, with all 4 being within the top 20 wooden coasters in the world on Mitch Hawkers poll. Since 2010, El Toro at Six Flags Great Adventure, which opened in 2006, has been ranked the number one wooden coaster in the world on Mitch Hawkers poll.

Notable designers from the former Custom Coasters International formed The Gravity Group and in 2005 opened Hades (now Hades 360) at Mt. Olympus Water and Theme Park. The coaster features highly unique elements, including an airtime filled pre-lift section, an 800-foot tunnel underneath a parking lot, and a 90 degree banked turn. In 2006, The Gravity Group built The Voyage at Holiday World, a large wooden coaster which stands 163 feet tall, has over 6,442 feet of track, three 90 degree banked turns, and has been ranked the number one wooden coaster in the world by Amusement Today five times. Many of the Gravity Group's coasters are highly unique and custom built for the park, such as Twister at Gröna Lund, which has a highly compact layout to fit in the parks small footprint. Their coasters have become very popular in China, in which 12 coasters have been built since 2009.

Rocky Mountain Construction (RMC) has recently been revolutionizing the modern wooden coaster. In 2011, they renovated the Texas Giant, which had become very rough and hard to maintain, into a steel roller coaster. This treatment became popular and was later applied to other aging roller coasters such as Iron Rattler and Twisted Colossus. In addition, RMC designs and builds their own original wooden coasters. In 2016, the company opened the world's first launched wooden roller coaster, Lightning Rod which opened at Dollywood in 2016, and until 2024 featured a magnetic launch of 45 mph up a 200' hill, similar to the magnetic lift on Maverick.

=== First inverting wooden coasters ===
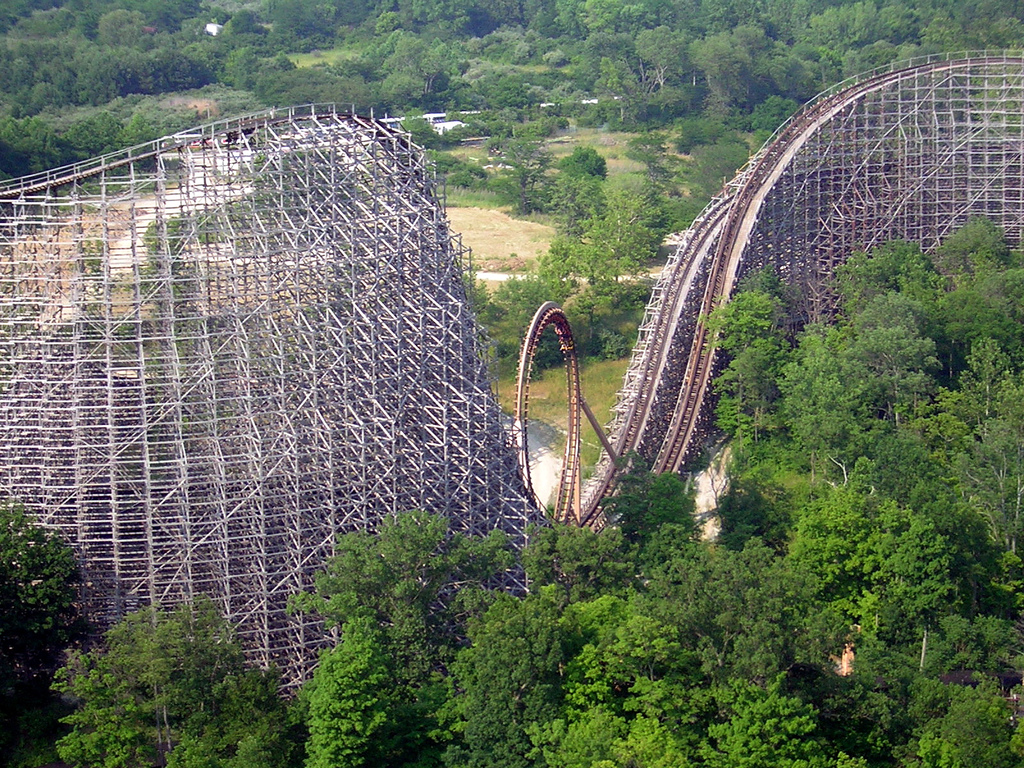
From 2000 to 2006, Son of Beast had a steel vertical loop (center)

In 2000, Kings Island opened Son of Beast. Designed by Werner Stengel and built by the Roller Coaster Corporation of America, the roller coaster broke many world records. With a height of 218 feet (66 m), it was the first wooden roller coaster to top 200 feet (61 m). It was also the first modern wooden roller coaster to feature an inversion, a 90-foot (27 m) vertical loop, which was made of steel. The ride was well-received but was plagued by a number of incidents, including two that were serious, eventually leading to its demise in 2012.

In the 2010s, a new era of wooden roller coasters came about with the introduction of Topper Track developed by Rocky Mountain Construction. The new technology replaced the flattened steel strip and upper two layers of wood traditionally used in wooden track design with a steel box, which led to rides like the triple-inverting Outlaw Run at Silver Dollar City in 2012. Others like Wildfire at Kolmården Wildlife Park and Goliath at Six Flags Great America soon followed. Topper Track provides the added benefit of smoother rides and lower maintenance costs.

The Gravity Group also designed five wooden coasters with a single inversion: these include coasters at each of three Oriental Heritage theme parks in China, all named Jungle Trailblazer, as well as Mine Blower in Fun Spot Kissimmee and the conversion of their existing Hades 360 in Mt. Olympus Water & Theme Park.

== Materials ==
=== Southern yellow pine ===
The common choice of wood selected for modern wooden roller coasters worldwide is southern yellow pine, a softwood abundant in the southern United States from eastern Texas to Virginia. It is known for its strength, which comes from its extremely dense properties. Southern pine is also easy to cut and responds well to pressure treatment.

=== Prefabricated track ===
Companies like Intamin and Rocky Mountain Construction began using prefabricated track in the 2010s. The design borrows the principles of steel coaster manufacturing and applies them to wood.

Traditional wooden coaster track is typically built on site. It is cut as needed, bent to the proper shape, and mounted layer-by-layer to the support structure with steel running plates. Prefabricated track, on the other hand, is manufactured in a factory, temperature-controlled setting. It is made of many thin layers of wood that are glued together and then laser cut to exact specifications. The track is made in 25-foot (7.6 m) sections, which have special joints on the ends to allow them to snap together. The result is generally higher precision than what could be achieved by hand, leading to a smoother ride and reduced cost surrounding construction and maintenance. In addition, unlike traditional wooden coasters which feature bare metal wheels, the trains for a prefabricated wooden coaster have wheels made of polyurethane treads, similar to a steel coaster.

== Wooden versus steel ==
Wooden roller coasters provide a very different ride and experience from steel roller coasters. While they are traditionally less capable than a steel coaster when it comes to inversions and elements (except for the chain lift hill), wooden coasters instead rely on an often rougher and more "wild" ride (depending on train speed and/or track layout), as well as a more psychological approach to inducing fear. Their structures and track, which usually move anywhere from a few inches to a few feet with a passing train, give a sense of unreliability and the "threat" of collapse or disregard for safety. Of course, this assumption is purely mental, since wooden roller coaster supports and track systems are designed to sway with the force produced by the coaster. If the track and structure were too rigid, they would break under the strain of the passing train. The swaying of the track reduces the maximum force applied, like a shock absorber.

Like steel roller coasters, wooden roller coasters usually use the same three-wheel design, pioneered by John Miller. Each set of wheels includes a running wheel (on top of the track), a side friction (or "guide") wheel (to guide motion in the lateral plane and reduce excessive side-to-side movement known as "hunting") and an upstop wheel (beneath the track to prevent cars from flying off the track). Some wooden coasters, such as Leap-The-Dips, do not have upstop wheels and are known as side friction roller coasters. As a result, the turns and drops are more gentle than on modern wooden roller coasters. Scenic Railway roller coasters also lack upstop wheels but rely on a brake operator to control the speed so that upstop wheels are not necessary. A handful of wooden coasters use flanged wheels, similar to a rail car, eliminating the need for side friction wheels.

Compared to steel coasters, wooden coasters generally cost less to initially construct for park. However, wooden coasters generally require more regular maintenance compared to steel coasters in order to keep a wooden ride in good condition. With parts of a wooden coasters track and supports often being replaced by parks annually. This more regular maintenance for wood coasters and the higher cost of replacing steel track and supports for steel coasters also makes it easier for well-maintained wooden roller coasters to have longer lifespans compared to steel roller coasters.

== Examples of wooden roller coasters ==
The following list is in alphabetical order.

Name	Park	Opened	Country	Notes
American Eagle	Six Flags Great America	1981	United States	Tallest and fastest racing coaster in the world
Big Dipper	Blackpool Pleasure Beach	1923	United Kingdom	Opened in 1923 and was reprofiled in 1936, adding two more drops and a brand new station. A Grade II listed building.
Apocalypse: The Ride	Six Flags Magic Mountain	2009	United States	Formerly themed as "Terminator Salvation: The Ride". Replacement for the dismantled and scrapped Psyclone.
Balder	Liseberg	2003	Sweden	Second "prefabricated" wooden coaster to be built
Blue Streak	Cedar Point	1964	United States	
Boulder Dash	Lake Compounce	2000	United States	Voted the world's #1 wooden roller coaster by the National Amusement Park Historical Association
The Beast	Kings Island	1979	United States	Longest wooden roller coaster in the world
Colossos	Heide Park	2001	Germany	One of the largest wooden coasters in the world
Colossus	Six Flags Magic Mountain	1978	United States	Was the world's tallest, fastest, and longest wooden roller coaster upon opening. In 2014, converted into a steel roller coaster.
The Comet	Six Flags Great Escape	1994	United States	Built for Crystal Beach Park in Crystal Beach, Ontario in 1948, it was purchased and relocated to Queensbury in 1993 after Crystal Beach closed down.
Coney Island Cyclone	Luna Park	1927	United States	Contained one of the steepest drops found on a wooden roller coaster (60 degrees) when it opened. It is protected under the National Register of Historic Places and is a New York City Designated Landmark.
The Cú Chulainn Coaster	Emerald Park	2015	Ireland	Ireland's first (and currently only) wooden coaster
Dragon Coaster	Playland Park	1929	United States	Named after the park's mascot, Coaster the Dragon, and allows the riders to "enter the dragon".
El Toro	Six Flags Great Adventure	2006	United States	Opened with one of the steepest drops of any wooden roller coaster (76 degrees).
Flying Turns	Knoebels Amusement Resort	2013	United States	Modern version of a classic wooden bobsled coaster. Its layout is similar to an older model located at Riverview Park.
GhostRider	Knott's Berry Farm	1998	United States	Longest wooden coaster on the West Coast.
Grand National	Pleasure Beach Blackpool	1935	United Kingdom	One of three Möbius loop roller coasters
The Great White	Morey's Piers	1996	United States	This ride was built over the beach because Morey's Piers ran out of room on the pier.
Grizzly	Kings Dominion	1982	United States	The grounds of the ride are densely forested, with the intended thrills heightened from the illusion of inadequate clearance between the track and trees. Layout based on Cincinnati Coney Island Wildcat.
Giant Dipper	Santa Cruz Beach Boardwalk	1924	United States	Located in Santa Cruz, California, it is among the last original oceanfront roller coasters still operating on the West Coast. It is protected under the National Register of Historic Places.
Giant Dipper	Belmont Park	1925	United States	Located in San Diego, California, it is among the last original oceanfront roller coasters still operating on the West Coast. It is protected under the National Register of Historic Places and is a California Historical Landmark and San Diego Historic Landmark.
Hullámvasút	City Park	1922	Hungary	Wooden roller coaster built to the plans of Ervin Dragon, is 17 m (55.8 ft) in height and travels 980 m (3,215 ft) in five minutes. It is one of the few remaining side friction roller coasters in the world, and is an ACE Coaster Classic, It has not been operational since 2015.
Jack Rabbit	Seabreeze Amusement Park	1920	United States	When it opened, it was the fastest roller coaster in the world (the title was taken by The Giant Dipper in 1924). In 1985 The Jack Rabbit became the oldest continuously operating coaster in the U.S. with the temporary closing of Leap-The-Dips.
Leap-The-Dips	Lakemont Park	1902	United States	The roller coaster was operated continuously until 1935, again from 1937 to 1985, and finally from 1999 to 2016. It reopened once again in 2020.
Le Monstre	La Ronde	1985	Canada	The tallest double track wooden roller coaster in the world
Loup Garou	Walibi Belgium	2001	Belgium	The biggest wooden roller coaster in operation in Belgium.
Megafobia	Oakwood Theme Park	1996	United Kingdom	Built by Custom Coasters International (CCI) in 1996. The coaster features a twister style layout. Megafobia was the first white-knuckle attraction to be installed at the Oakwood Theme Park (then Oakwood Leisure Park) in West Wales.
Outlaw Run	Silver Dollar City	2013	United States	When built it was the only wooden roller coaster to feature inversions, including a double barrel roll and an over-banked turn, and also was the steepest wooden coaster in the world with an 81 degree drop (since broken by Switchback at ZDT’s Amusement Park with an 87 degree drop).
Phoenix	Knoebels' Amusement Resort	1985	United States	First large-scale wooden roller coaster to be relocated when it was moved from San Antonio to its current location in Elysburg, Pennsylvania.
Racer 75	Kings Dominion	1975	United States	Racing roller coaster, featuring two individual tracks that parallel each other. From 1993 to 2007 the Racer 75 had one side of the tracks traveling forwards and one side traveling backwards.
ROAR	Six Flags America, Six Flags Discovery Kingdom	1998, 1999	United States	Two wooden coasters operated by Six Flags; the version at Discovery Kingdom was removed in 2015 and converted to RMC hybrid coaster "Joker".
Roller Coaster	Lagoon Amusement Park	1921	United States	Known simply as "Roller Coaster" or the "White Roller Coaster" by locals.
Roller Coaster	Great Yarmouth Pleasure Beach	1932	United Kingdom	A roller coaster requiring a brakeman to ride the train, and the only operational scenic railway in the UK. It is also an ACE Coaster Classic.
Rutschebanen	Tivoli	1914	Denmark	Formerly known as Bjergrutschebanen (the Mountain Roller Coaster); still run with brake men
Scenic Railway	Luna Park	1912	Australia	A roller coaster requiring a brakeman to ride the train. It is also an ACE Coaster Classic.
Scenic Railway	Dreamland Margate	1920	United Kingdom	The oldest wooden coaster in Britain and the 3rd oldest in the world. In 2002 the ride became a Grade II listed building – the first UK amusement park attraction to achieve this status. It closed in 2006 and 25% of it was damaged by fire on 7 April 2008, however, it was fully restored and reopened to the public in 2015.
Shivering Timbers	Michigan's Adventure	1998	United States	The world's 4th longest wooden roller coaster.
Son of Beast	Kings Island	2000	United States	At the time of its opening, was the world's tallest and fastest wooden roller coaster, and the only wooden coaster to have an inversion, before that element was removed in 2007. It closed in 2009 and was demolished in 2012.
T Express	Everland Resort	2008	South Korea	Current record holder for the steepest wooden roller coaster (77 degrees).
Thunderbolt	Kennywood	1968	United States	Declared "King of the Coasters" by the New York Times
Timberhawk: Ride of Prey	Wild Waves Theme Park	2003	United States	
Tonnerre de Zeus	Parc Astérix	1997	France	
Tremors	Silverwood Theme Park	1999	United States	
Viper	Six Flags Great America	1995	United States	Only wooden roller coaster originally built in-house by Six Flags, and a mirror image of the Coney Island Cyclone.
Wooden Roller Coaster	Playland	1958	Canada	Has speeds up to 76 km/h (47 mph). Featured in the movie Riding the Bullet.
The Voyage	Holiday World & Splashin' Safari	2006	United States	Features three 90-degree banked turns and is the second longest wooden roller coaster in the world behind The Beast.
Vuoristorata	Linnanmäki	1951	Finland	A roller coaster requiring a brakeman to ride the train, and the last built roller coaster in the world to use side friction technology. It is also an ACE Coaster Classic.
Wicker Man	Alton Towers	2018	United Kingdom	Wicker Man was the UK's first wooden roller coaster to be built in 21 years after Megafobia in Wales.
Yankee Cannonball	Canobie Lake Park	1936	United States	
Zippin Pippin	Bay Beach Amusement Park	2011	United States	The second oldest extant roller coaster in America formerly at Libertyland, Memphis, Tennessee from 1923 to 2005. It was Elvis Presley's favorite roller coaster, and he rode the Zippin Pippin eight days before he died.

== See also ==
- Thrill ride
