= Stunt Pilot (roller coaster) =

Single-rail coaster at Silverwood

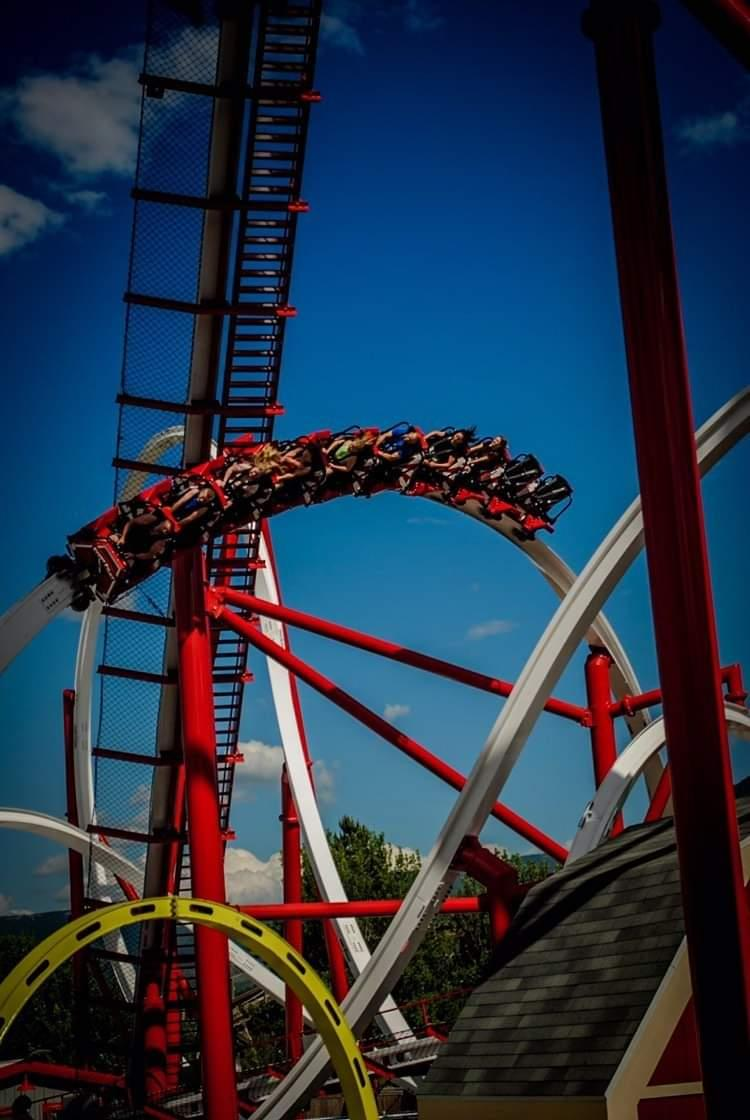

Silverwood Theme Park
- Location: Silverwood Theme Park
- Park section: Rollercoaster Alley
- Coordinates: 47.9065°N 116.7080°W
- Status: Operating
- Opening date: May 29, 2021

General statistics
- Type: Steel – Single-rail
- Manufacturer: Rocky Mountain Construction
- Designer: Alan Schilke
- Model: Raptor Track
- Track layout: Custom
- Lift/launch system: Chain lift hill
- Height: 105 ft (32 m)
- Drop: 100 ft (30 m)
- Length: 1,800 ft (550 m)
- Speed: 52 mph (84 km/h)
- Inversions: 3
- Max vertical angle: 87°
- Height restriction: 48 in (122 cm)
- Trains: 2 trains with 10 cars. Riders are arranged 1 across in a single row for a total of 10 riders per train.
- Website: Official website
- Single rider line available
- Stunt Pilot at RCDB

Stunt Pilot is a steel roller coaster at Silverwood Theme Park in Athol, Idaho. The single-rail Raptor model was manufactured by Rocky Mountain Construction, who is headquartered 20 minutes south of the park. Its stunt pilot theme pays homage to the daily air shows that were once hosted at the park from 1988 to 1996. Stunt Pilot opened to the public on May 29, 2021.

== History ==
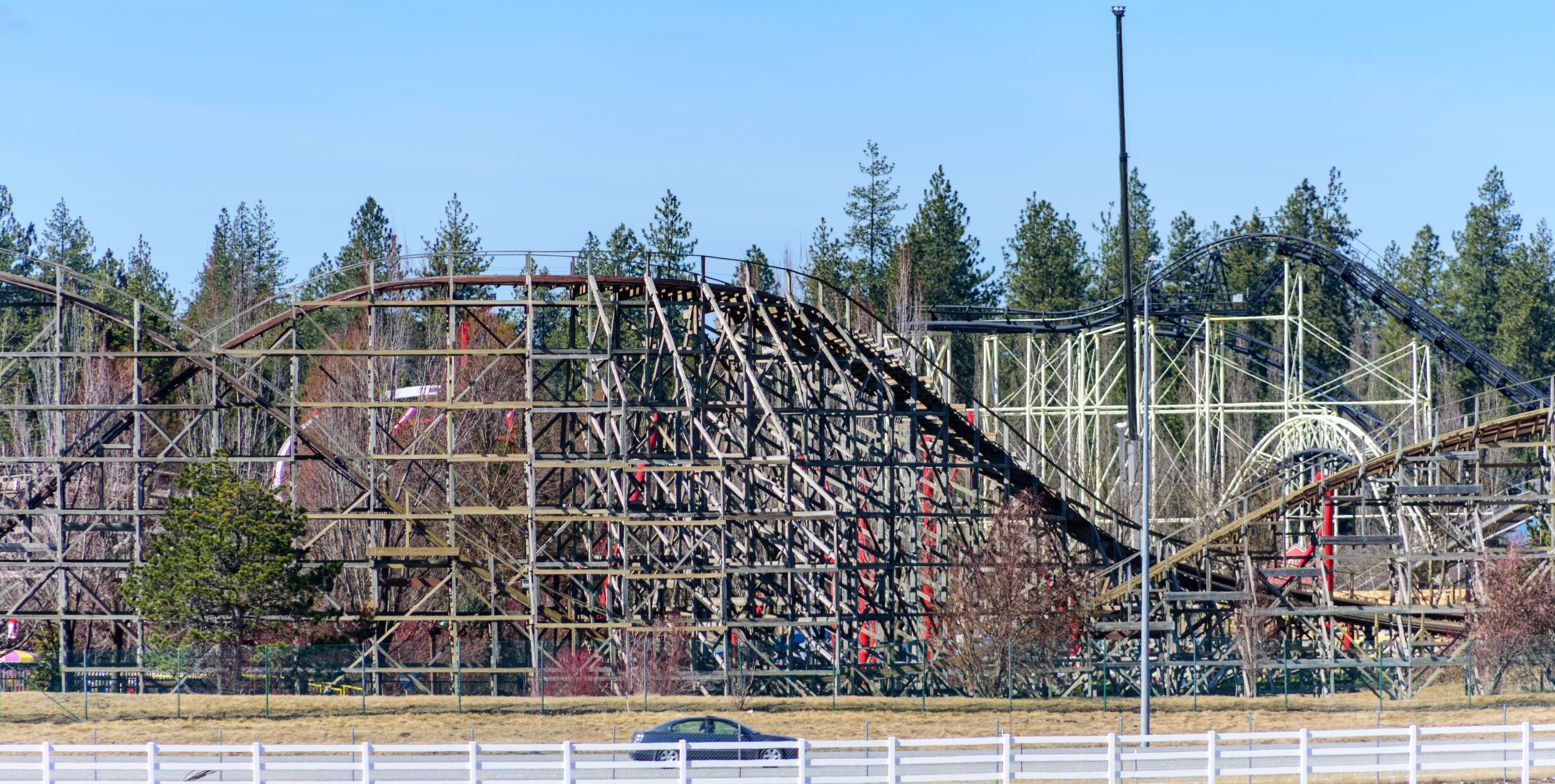
Construction of Stunt Pilot from the highway

Rocky Mountain Construction (RMC) was originally hired by Kentucky Kingdom amusement park to design and manufacture a single-rail roller coaster in time for the park's 2021 season. Permits were filed with the FAA, which were uncovered by the public in June 2020 following a series of intentional leaks by the park on social media. As a result of the COVID-19 pandemic, however, Kentucky Kingdom backed out of the project, and its FAA filing was officially withdrawn in December 2020.

After development stalled at Kentucky Kingdom, Silverwood Theme Park picked up the project, and began teasing a similar attraction through social media on September 3, 2020. The single-rail coaster was unveiled as Stunt Pilot on September 17, 2020, with its aerobatics theme meant to commemorate Silverwood's aviation history and daily air shows that were once on display from 1988 to 1996. The park is located on the former Henley Aerodrome airfield. Daily air shows ended following a fatal crash during an air show at Fairchild Air Force Base on September 15, 1996.

Construction of the new ride began in early 2021, with sections of track arrived in February 2021. The first piece was installed on March 4, 2021, and the final track piece was placed on May 3, 2021. By mid-May, the coaster had performed its first test runs. The ride opened on May 29, 2021.

== Ride experience ==
=== Layout ===
The ride begins by exiting the station and immediately ascending the 105-foot-tall (32 m) chain lift hill. The train then banks left into a 180-degree turn and enters the signature 87-degree drop, diving and reaching a maximum speed of 52 mph (84 km/h). It enters a dive loop and rises up an airtime hill, followed by an ascending, banked turnaround, where it proceeds into a hairpin turn to the left. The train drops and immediately traverses a cutback followed by a corkscrew. The finale features a quick dip into an over-banked turn and ends with a slight uphill popup into the brake run.

=== Model ===
Stunt Pilot is a Raptor coaster from Rocky Mountain Construction, a local roller coaster firm based in Hayden, Idaho. The company had previously worked with Silverwood to install and test their then-prototype "topper track" system on nearly 700 feet of Tremors in 2010. The coaster uses a monorail-esque track system that lets the train run along a single 15.5" thick rail.

=== Trains ===
Stunt Pilot features ten-passenger trains, unlike the trains of similar models RailBlazer at California's Great America and Wonder Woman Golden Lasso Coaster at Six Flags Fiesta Texas which hold only 8 passengers. Riders are seated in ten rows with one per row.

== Gallery ==
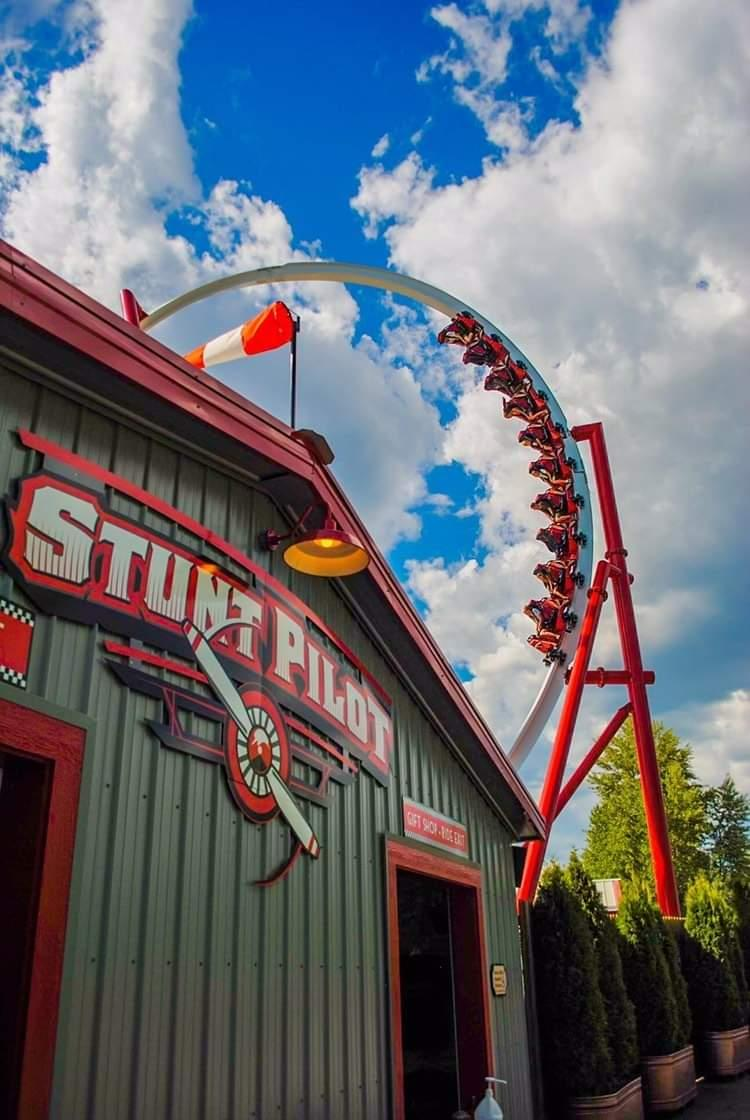
Entrance to Stunt Pilot

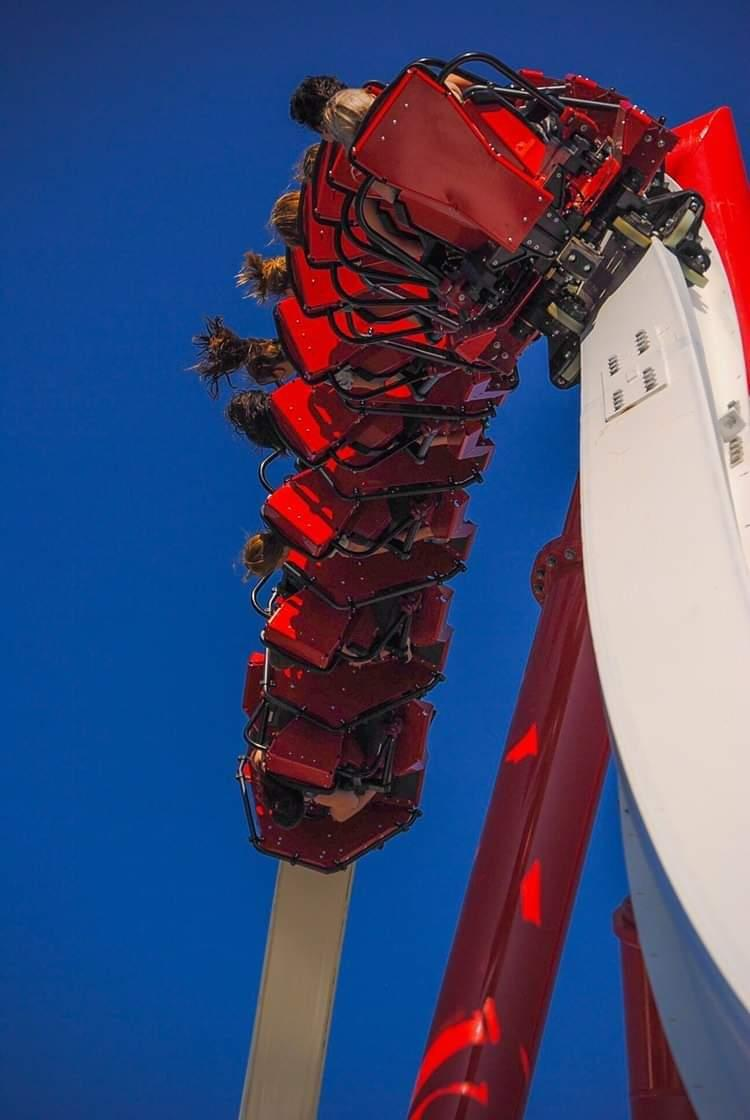
Stunt Pilot train on first inversion

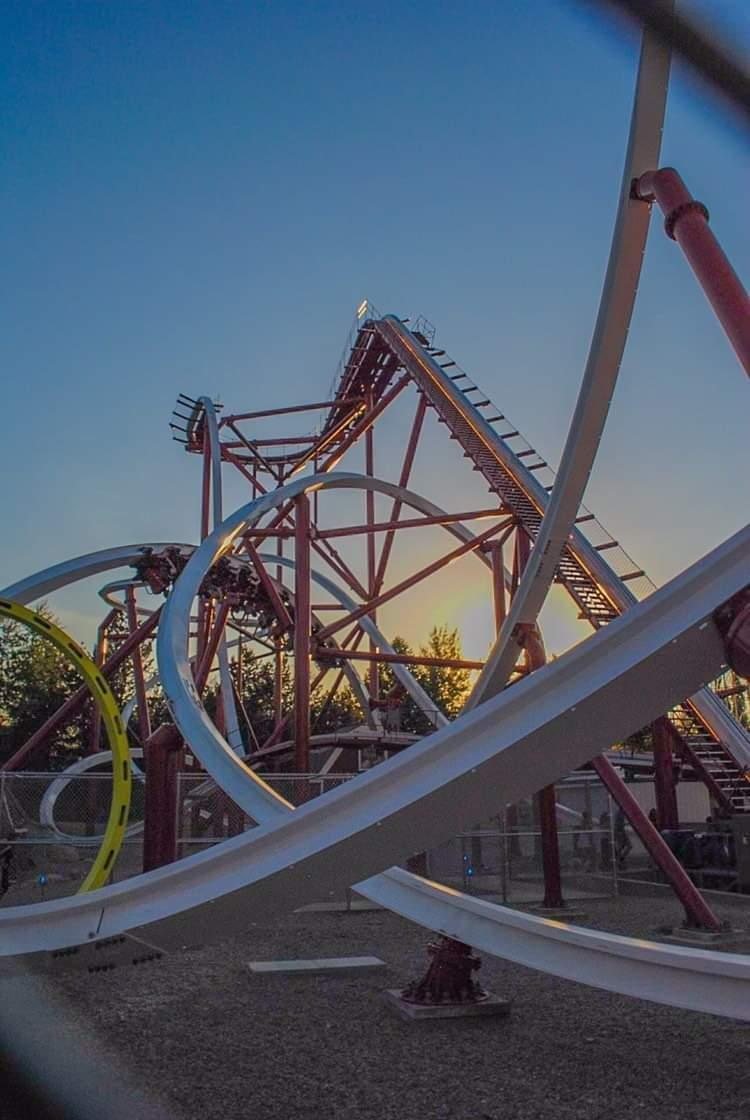
Stunt Pilot Course at Sunset

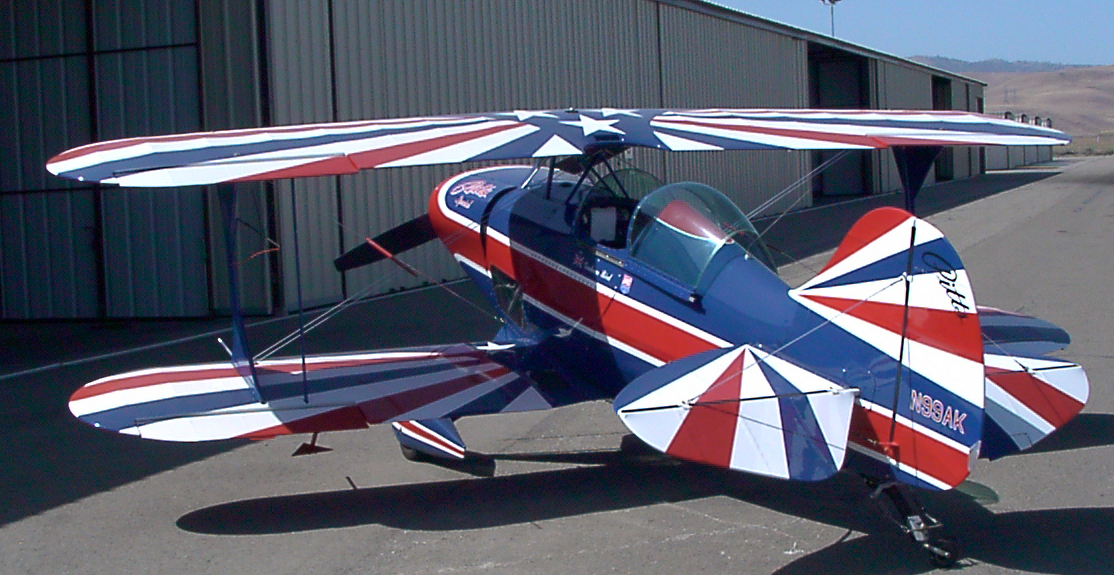
Stunt Pilot has some theming to the Pitt Special biplanes
