= Single-rail roller coaster =

Type of roller coaster

A single–rail roller coaster is a roller coaster that rides on only one rail, as opposed to the far more conventional two-rail setup of most roller coasters. The use of a single-rail design can often reduce costs in the manufacturing and construction process, and allow for a more compact ride footprint. While traditionally seen on alpine coasters, since the late 2010s, a number of ride manufacturers have produced a number of conventional rollercoasters which feature single-rail track. The vast majority of modern single-rail coasters utilise inline (single-file) seating arrangements.

== Alpine/Mountain coasters ==
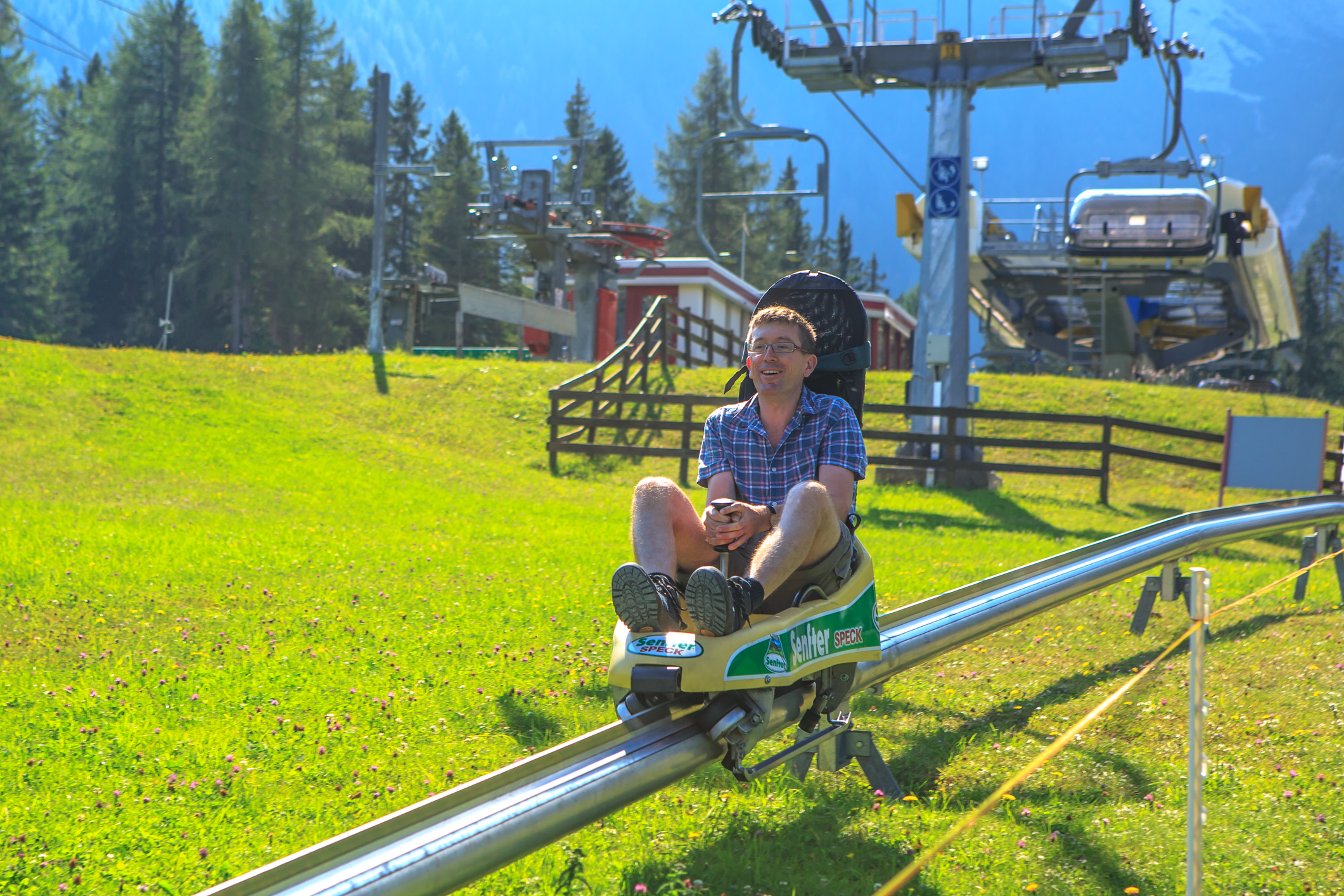
An example of a single-rail alpine coaster.

- Besna Pehta - (Slovenia) Besna Pehta, Kranjska Gora, Upper Carniola
- Bobová dráha - (Slovakia) Fun Park Žiarce, Pavčina Lehota, Žilina
- Bobová dráha - (Czech Republic) Ski Areál Kaste Petříkov, Ostružná, Olomouc
- Clézy Gliss - (France) Clézy Gliss, Clécy, Normandy
- Erlebnis-Rodelbahn Ruhla - (Germany) Erlebnis-Arena-Ruhla, Ruhla, Thuringia
- Fisser Flitzer - (Austria) Sommer-Funpark Fiss, Fiss, Tyrol
- Funbob – (Italy) Adventure Park Cimone, Sestola, Emilia-Romagna
- The Pipe Mountain Coaster – (Canada) Revelstoke Mountain Resort, Revelstoke, British Columbia
- Rail Runner - (United States) Anakeesta, Gatlinburg, Tennessee
- Rowdy Bear Mountain Glider – (United States) Rowdy Bear Mountain, Gatlinburg, Tennessee

== Rocky Mountain Construction ==
Rocky Mountain Construction was the first manufacturer to produce modern single-rail coasters, opening their first in 2018. As of 2025, the company's only single-rail model on offer is the Raptor, an inline-seated high thrill model.

Name	Model	Park	Country	Opened	Status	Ref.	Image
Wonder Woman Golden Lasso Coaster	Raptor	Six Flags Fiesta Texas	United States	2018	Operating		
RailBlazer	Raptor	California's Great America	United States	2018	Operating		
Jersey Devil Coaster	Raptor	Six Flags Great Adventure	United States	2021	Operating		
Stunt Pilot	Raptor	Silverwood	United States	2021	Operating		
Wonder Woman Flight of Courage	Raptor	Six Flags Magic Mountain	United States	2022	Operating		
Sköll & Hati	Raptor	Gyeongju World	South Korea	2024	Operating		
Fire Runner	Raptor	Lost Island Theme Park	United States	2025	Operating		
YoY	Raptor	Walibi Holland	Netherlands	2025	Operating		
unknown	Raptor	Family Kingdom Amusement Park	United States	2027	Under Construction		

== Intamin ==
Intamin's primary single-rail model on offer is the Hot Racer, a launched model featuring inline seating. As of 2026, three have been built.

Name	Model	Park	Country	Opened	Status	Ref.	Image
Big Dipper	Hot Racer	Luna Park Sydney	Australia	2021	Operating		
Mahuka	Hot Racer	Walibi Rhône-Alpes	France	2024	Operating		
Flame of Speed (Пламя Скорости)	Hot Racer	Dream Island	Russia	2026	Operating		
Midgårdsormen	Hot Racer	Djurs Sommerland	Denmark	2027	Under Construction		

== Skyline Attractions ==
Skyline Attractions offers a range of different single-rail models. Family and kiddie models such as the P'sghetti Bowl are traditional coasters, while the Skywarp thrill model utilises two trains that are uniquely mechanically linked. As of 2025, all coasters designed by Skyline are permanently closed.

Name	Model	Park	Country	Opened	Status	Ref.
Harley Quinn Crazy Coaster (•)	Skywarp	Six Flags Discovery Kingdom	United States	2018	Removed	
Tidal Twister (•)	Skywarp Horizon	SeaWorld San Diego	United States	2019	Removed	
Brava!	P'Sghetti Bowl	MASS MoCA	United States	2022	Removed	
Kid Flash Cosmic Coaster	P'Sghetti Bowl	Six Flags Fiesta Texas	United States	2023	Removed	
Kid Flash Cosmic Coaster	P'Sghetti Bowl	Six Flags Over Georgia	United States	2023	Removed	

(•) = track produced by Rocky Mountain Construction
