= Silverwood Theme Park =

Amusement park in northern Idaho, U.S.

Silverwood Theme Park & Boulder Beach Water Park

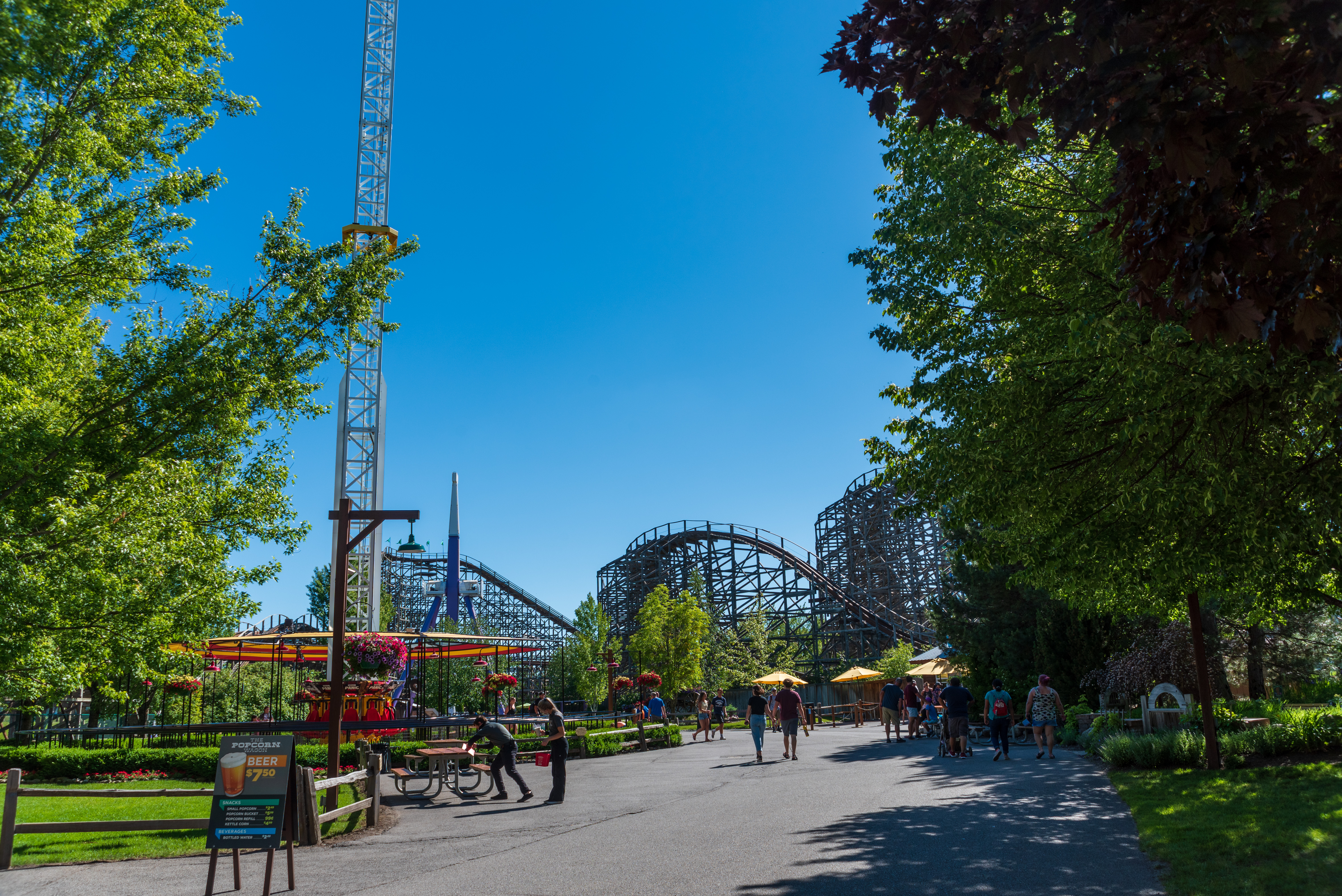
- Roller Coaster Alley
- Interactive map of Silverwood Theme Park & Boulder Beach Water Park
- Location: Athol, Idaho, U.S.
- Coordinates: 47.9085°N 116.705°W
- Status: Operating
- Opened: June 20, 1988
- Owner: Herschend
- General manager: Juston Henry
- Operating season: May through late October
- Attendance: 803,000
- Area: 413 acres (167 ha)

Attractions
- Total: Theme Park: 22; Water Park: 12; Total: 41
- Roller coasters: 7
- Website: silverwoodthemepark.com

Silverwood Theme Park is an amusement park located near the city of Athol in northern Idaho, United States, near the city of Coeur d'Alene, approximately 47 miles (76 km) from Spokane, Washington on US 95. The park opened on June 20, 1988. Originally, the park included a small assortment of carnival rides, a "main street" with shops and eateries, and an authentic steam train that traveled in a 30-minute loop around the owner's property. From 1973 to 1988, the land, along with a fully functioning airstrip, was operated as the Henley Aerodrome, named after the family from whom Norton bought it in 1981.

Over the years, Silverwood has grown in both size and popularity, transforming from a small local amusement park to a regional theme park destination. In 2003, an adjacent waterpark named Boulder Beach Water Park was opened. Entrance to Boulder Beach is included with admission to Silverwood. In 2009, Silverwood began an annual Halloween event called Scarywood, held during evenings in the month of October. In November 2025, Herschend Family Entertainment announced a signed exclusive term sheet to acquire Silverwood Theme Park. On March 27, 2026, the sale was completed and Herschend Family Entertainment became the new owner.

As of 2026, Silverwood is the largest theme and water park in the American Northwest. 413 acres (167 ha) It has more than 70 rides, slides, shows, and attractions. It is also the northernmost theme park in the United States. In 2019, Silverwood co-hosted (along with Rocky Mountain Construction) the Golden Ticket Awards.

== Timeline ==
Park timeline
- 1973: Henley Aerodrome founded by Clayton Henley.
- 1981: Gary Norton buys Henley Aerodrome from the heirs of the Henley estate, lengthening and other improvements are done to the airstrip. Hangar is turned into an air museum.
- 1986: Norton outbids Disney and others for a narrow gauge locomotive for use at the Aerodrome.
- 1988: Walter Deptula, with skills and background operating visitor attractions in Hawaii is hired by Gary Norton as first General Manager. This ensures Silverwood was able to open to the public later that year with a 3 ft (914 mm) narrow gauge Silverwood Central Railway, an airshow and Main Street shops.
- 1990: Roaring Creek Log Flume (relocated from Kentucky Kingdom), Corkscrew (relocated from Knott's Berry Farm), and Country Carnival.
- 1993: Thunder Canyon
- 1996: Timber Terror (originally named Grizzly). Silverwood also stopped their airshows after the death of pilot Bob Heale in an unrelated accident.
- 1998: Tinywood opens (later Garfield's Summer Camp).
- 1999: Tremors
- 2001: Garfield becomes the official mascot of the park. Tinywood becomes Garfield's Summer Camp.
- 2003: Boulder Beach Water Park opens including Elkhorn Creek lazy river, Wave Pool, Rumble Falls tube slides, and Polliwog Park children's area.
- 2004: Boulder Beach expansion including Velocity Peak speed slides.
- 2005: Trabant and new Sky Diver.
- 2006: Panic Plunge
- 2007: Boulder Beach expansion including second Wave Pool, Avalanche Mountain, and Toddler Springs children's area.
- 2008: Aftershock (relocated from Six Flags Great America).
- 2009: Scarywood debut.
- 2011: Boulder Beach expansion including Ricochet Rapids; theme park addition of Frog Hopper and Butterflyer.
- 2013: SpinCycle and Barnstormer.
- 2014: Garfield's Summer Camp Expansion including: Krazy Koaster, and Puppy Go Round. Kiddie Wheel relocated.
- 2016: Riptide Racer.
- 2018: Silverwood celebrates 30 years, Boulder Beach celebrates 15, Toy Store expanded
- 2019: New Tilt-A-Whirl, Silverwood co-hosts Golden Ticket Awards with Rocky Mountain Construction
- 2021: Stunt Pilot (RMC Raptor), Garfield's Summer Camp re-themed to Critter Camp and Garfield is no longer the park mascot.
- 2022: Timber Terror and Tremors get new 208 Retrak.
- 2023: Timber Terror and Tremors gets a combined 1000 feet of 208 Retrak
- 2024: Boulder Beach expansion with the opening of Eagle Hunt and Salmon Run, Part of the New Emerald Forest Expansion.
- 2025: Herschend and Silverwood Inc. sign an exclusive term sheet for Herschend to acquire Silverwood Theme Park.
- 2026: Herschend becomes the new owner of Silverwood Theme Park.

== Scarywood Haunted Nights ==
In 2009, Silverwood opened Scarywood Haunted Nights, nighttime entertainment consisting of scare zones and mazes. In 2010, Scarywood returned on a larger scale. The main attractions for Scarywood include: Blood Bayou, an indoor haunted attraction; Chuckles 3D Sideshow, an outdoor haunt; several scare zones and other walk through as well as the Timber Terror: Backwards. In 2020, due to concerns with Covid-19, Scarywood was cancelled. The park did remain open weekends in October without the scary theming though. Scarywood Haunted Nights returned in 2021 with one new haunted house - Pharaoh's Curse. In 2024, Scarywood added a new outdoor haunt, The Swine.

== Current Silverwood Theme Park rides ==
=== Roller coasters ===
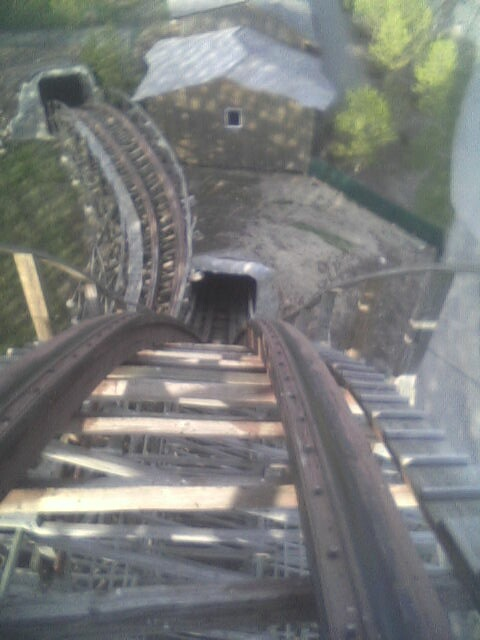
First drop on the Tremors roller coaster

Ride	Opened	Manufacturer	Description
Aftershock	2008	Vekoma	An inverted roller coaster, relocated from Six Flags Great America where it was known as Déjà Vu. Riders are arranged in a V-shaped seating configuration below the track where their legs dangle. The coaster is the third generation of Boomerang, known as the Giant Inverted Boomerang. Aftershock is also the last operating Giant Inverted Boomerang in North America.
Corkscrew	1990	Arrow Development	A steel roller coaster, relocated from Knott's Berry Farm in 1990. When Corkscrew first opened in 1975 at Knott's Berry Farm, it achieved two things of historical significance. Corkscrew was not only the first modern inverting coaster in the world, but it also was the first roller coaster to take riders upside down twice.
Krazy Koaster	2014	SBF Visa Group	A children's spinning roller coaster with a figure-8 layout. The cars of the train spin freely based on weight distribution.
Stunt Pilot	2021	Rocky Mountain Construction	A Single Rail coaster that is similar to California's Great America's RailBlazer and close mirror of Six Flags Fiesta Texas's Wonder Woman Golden Lasso Coaster.
Timber Terror	1996	Custom Coasters International	A wooden roller coaster with a classic out-and-back layout. The ride uses trains from Philadelphia Toboggan Coasters. Formerly known as the Grizzly until a potential lawsuit from the former Paramount Parks prompted the name change. Since 2010, the train has been reversed for the park's Scarywood Haunted Nights events every October. Starting in 2022, the park has also begun to add 208 RetraK to portions of the layout.
Tiny Toot	1998	Zamperla	A powered roller coaster themed to a mine train for young children and parents as well. Ride is driven by a rear wheel that runs along a central tread that runs along the middle of the track. Ride has an oval layout and runs over a small manmade creek.
Tremors	1999	Custom Coasters International	A wooden roller coaster with a twister layout that uses the terrain to its advantage. It features four tunnels, the first of which goes under the ride's gift shop. The coaster uses rolling stock from the Philadelphia Toboggan Coasters company. In 2010, the ride was the first to receive "topper track," a new track system designed by Rocky Mountain Construction of Hayden, Idaho. The new system, similar to the company's new Iron Horse I-Box track system is designed to cut down on track maintenance, as well as daily wear and tear. Rocky Mountain Construction has also begun to add their new 208 RetraK track to portions of the ride starting in 2020

=== Other rides ===
Ride	Description	Manufacturer
Antique Cars	Track based car ride.	Arrow Dynamics
Bumper Boats	Bumper boats.	J&J Amusements
Butterflyer	A Happy Swing ride.	Zamperla
Carousel	Carousel.	Allan Herschell Company
Ferris wheel	Ferris Wheel.	Eli Bridge Company
Flying Elephants	Children's elephant ride.	Unknown
Frog Hopper	A Frog Hopper ride.	Wisdom Rides
Kiddie Wheel	Children's Ferris wheel.	Zamperla
Kiddie Copters	Children's helicopter ride.	Allan Herschell Company
Krazy Kars	Bumper cars.	Unknown
Panic Plunge	Drop Tower.	A.R.M. / Larson International
Paratrooper ride	A Paratrooper ride.	Hrubetz
Puppy-Go-Round	A children's dog ride.	SBF Visa Group
Red Baron	Children's airplane ride	Unknown
Roaring Creek Log Flume	A Log Flume ride. Previously operated at Kentucky Kingdom from 1987 to 1988 as "Ohio River Adventure".	Arrow Dynamics
Scrambler	A scrambler ride.	Eli Bridge Company
Silverwood Central Railway	30 minute, 3 ft (914 mm) narrow gauge, steam engine-pulled train ride around park property.	H.K. Porter, Inc.
SpinCycle	A Maxi Dance Party 360, Largest of its kind in the United States and tallest of its kind in the world.	SBF Visa Group
Super Round Up	A Roundup ride.	Hrubetz
Thunder Canyon	White water raft ride designed and built in-house, with lift and rafts supplied by Hopkins Rides.	Trough and scenery done in-house with boats, lift, and brakes from Hopkins Rides
Tilt-a-Whirl	Classic tilt-a-whirl ride; replaced park's original Tilt-a-Whirl in 2019.	Larson International

=== Defunct rides ===
Ride	Description	
Trabant replaced Monster	Chance Trabant	
Skydiver	Chance Skydiver	
Barnstormer	Variation of Crazy Bus ride design.	Zamperla
Monster (1988-2004)	Eyerly Monster	
Unknown Kiddie Coaster	Made by Molina & Son's	

== Current Boulder Beach Water Park slides & attractions ==
Ride	Year opened	Description
Avalanche Mountain	2007	6-Person Raft Slide.
Boulder Beach Bay	2003 (1st), 2007 (2nd)	Set of 2 side-by-side wave pools.
Elkhorn Creek	2003	Lazy River.
Polliwog Park	2003	Water play complex featuring hoses, slides, shallow water pools, rope bridges, and a giant water bucket above.
Ricochet Rapids	2011	4-Person enclosed raft slide.
Rumble Falls	2003	4-tube slide complex, featuring four slides, each with their own unique layout, with two enclosed, one fully open, and the fourth half-enclosed, half-open.
Toddler Springs	2007	Toddler play complex.
Velocity Peak	2004	3-speed slide complex, featuring three speed slides side-by-side, each with their own unique layout, with one enclosed spiraling slide, one open slide, and one half-enclosed, half-open slide with recorded speeds of up to 55 mph.
Riptide Racer	2016	A 6-person racing waterslide. 55.8 feet tall with 405.9 feet of slide.
Eagle Hunt	2024	A 925 feet long Proslide water coaster.
Salmon Run	2024	Kids slide complex

== Gallery ==
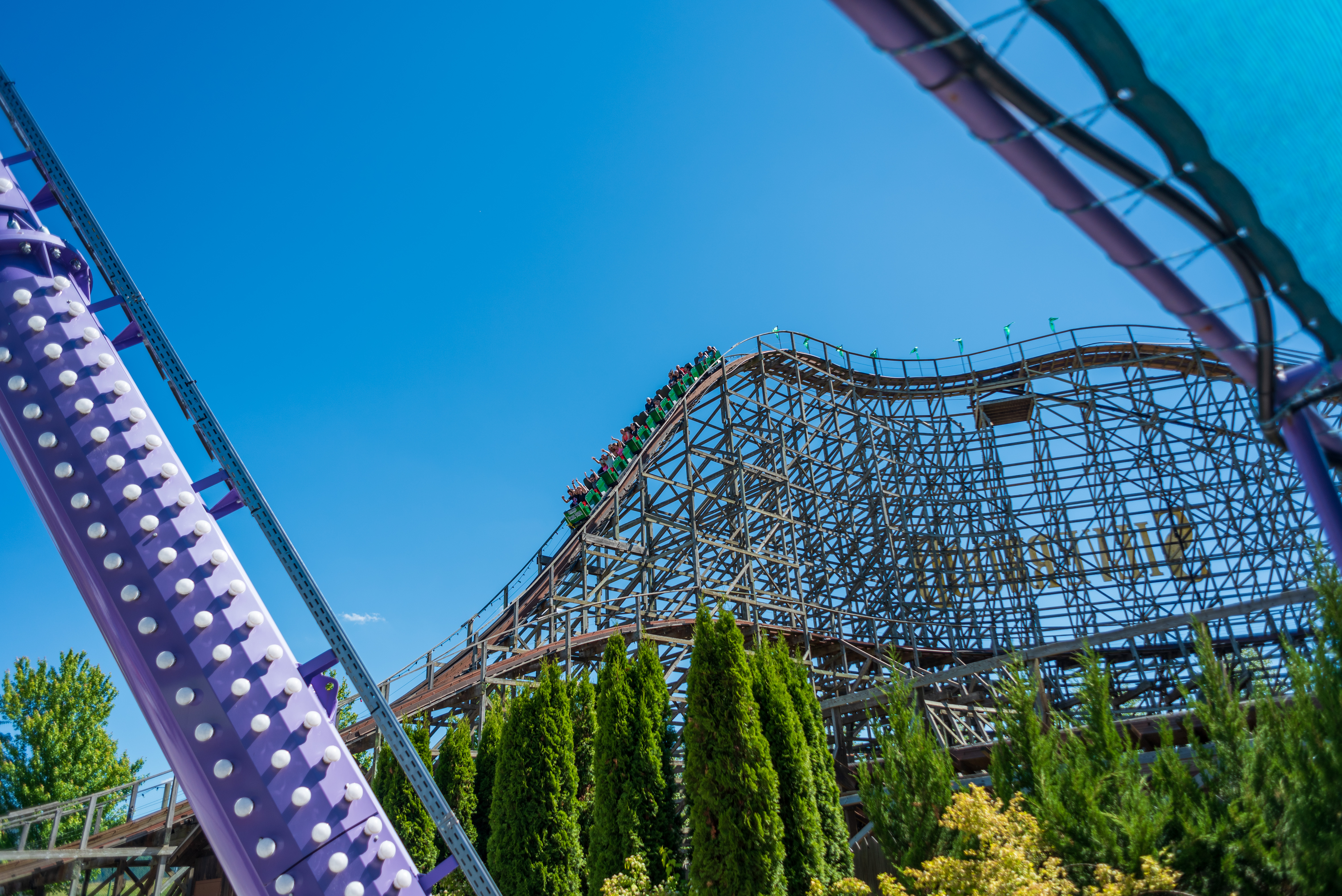
Timber Terror

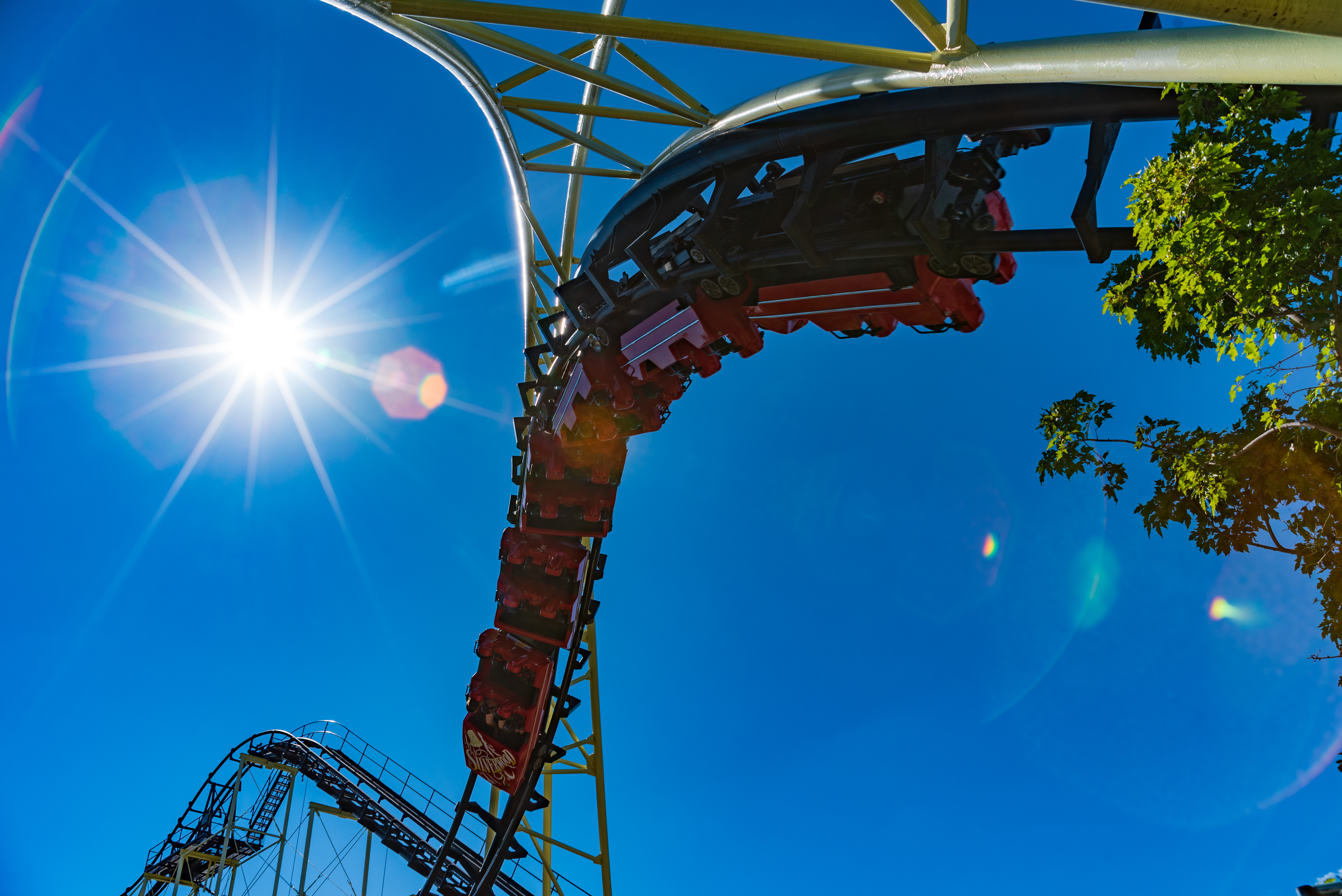
Corkscrew

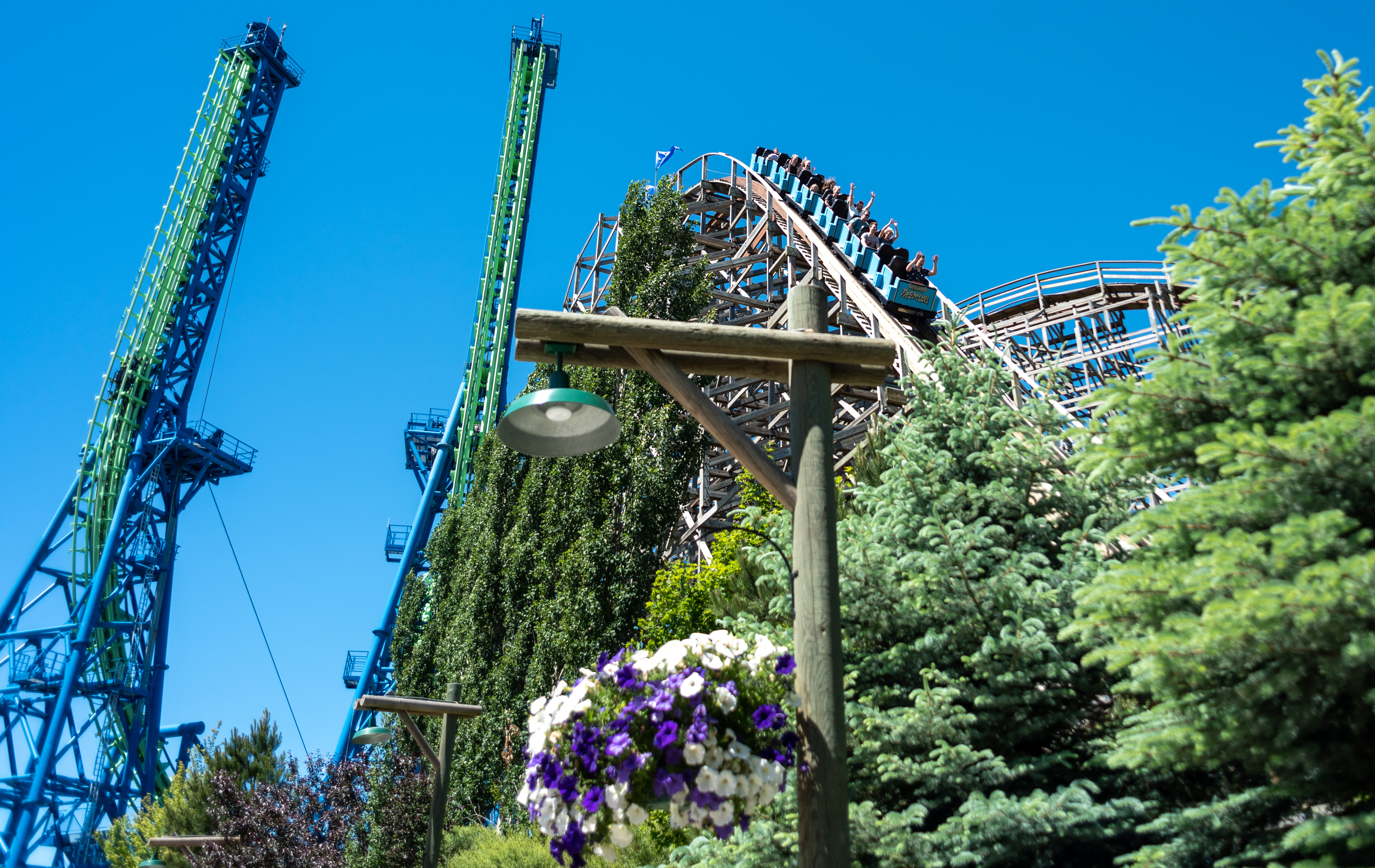
Tremors

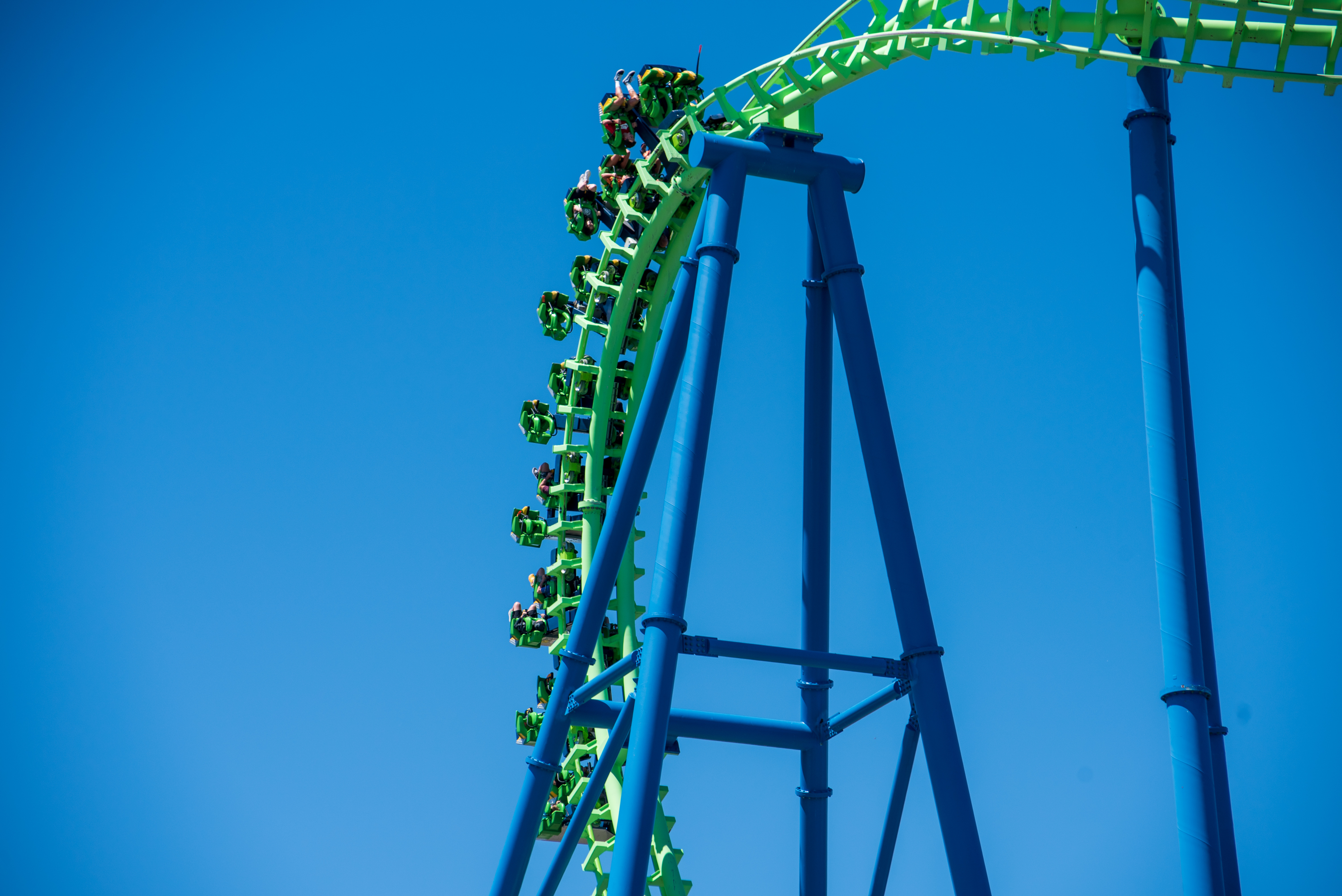
Aftershock

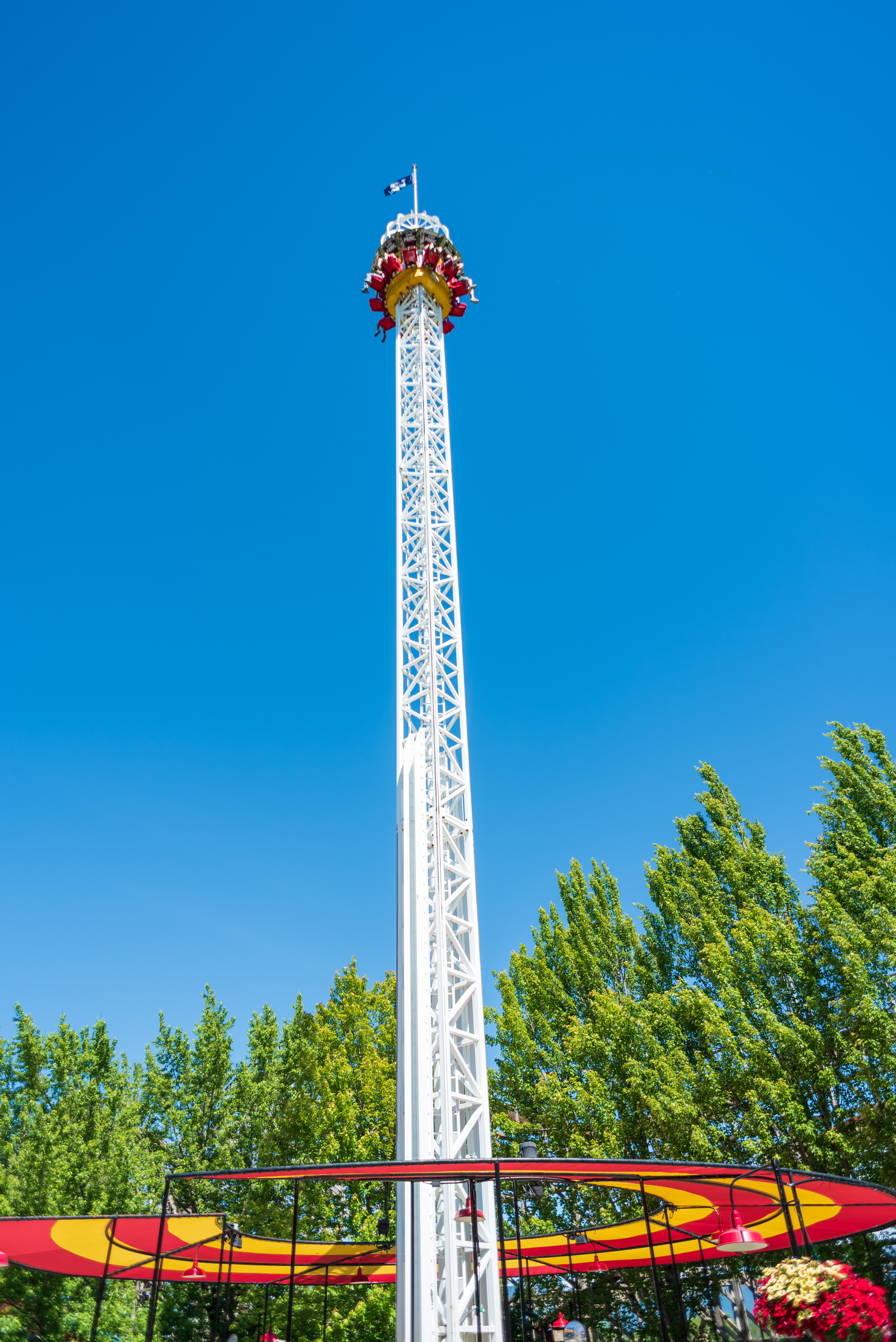
Panic Plunge

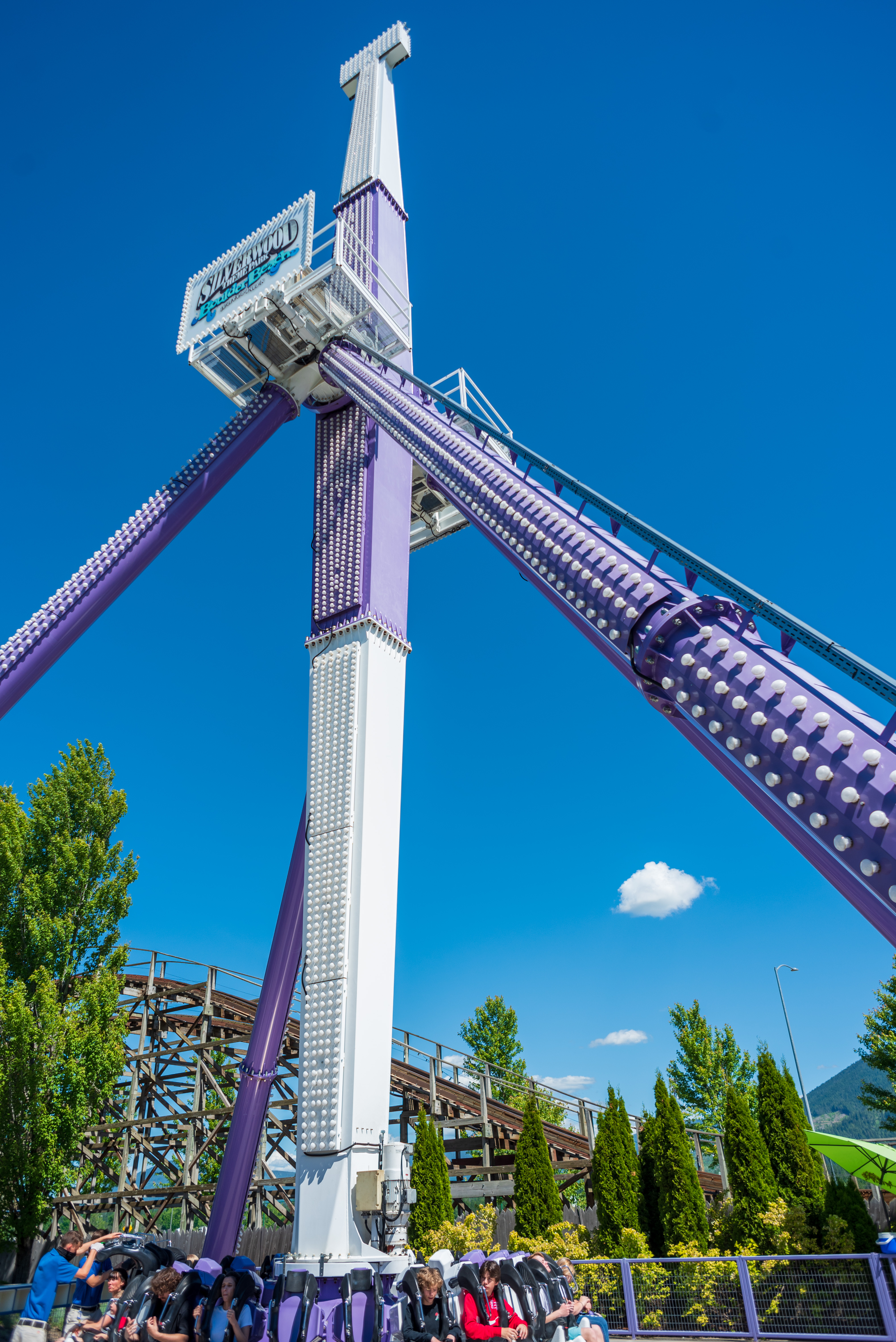
Spin Cycle

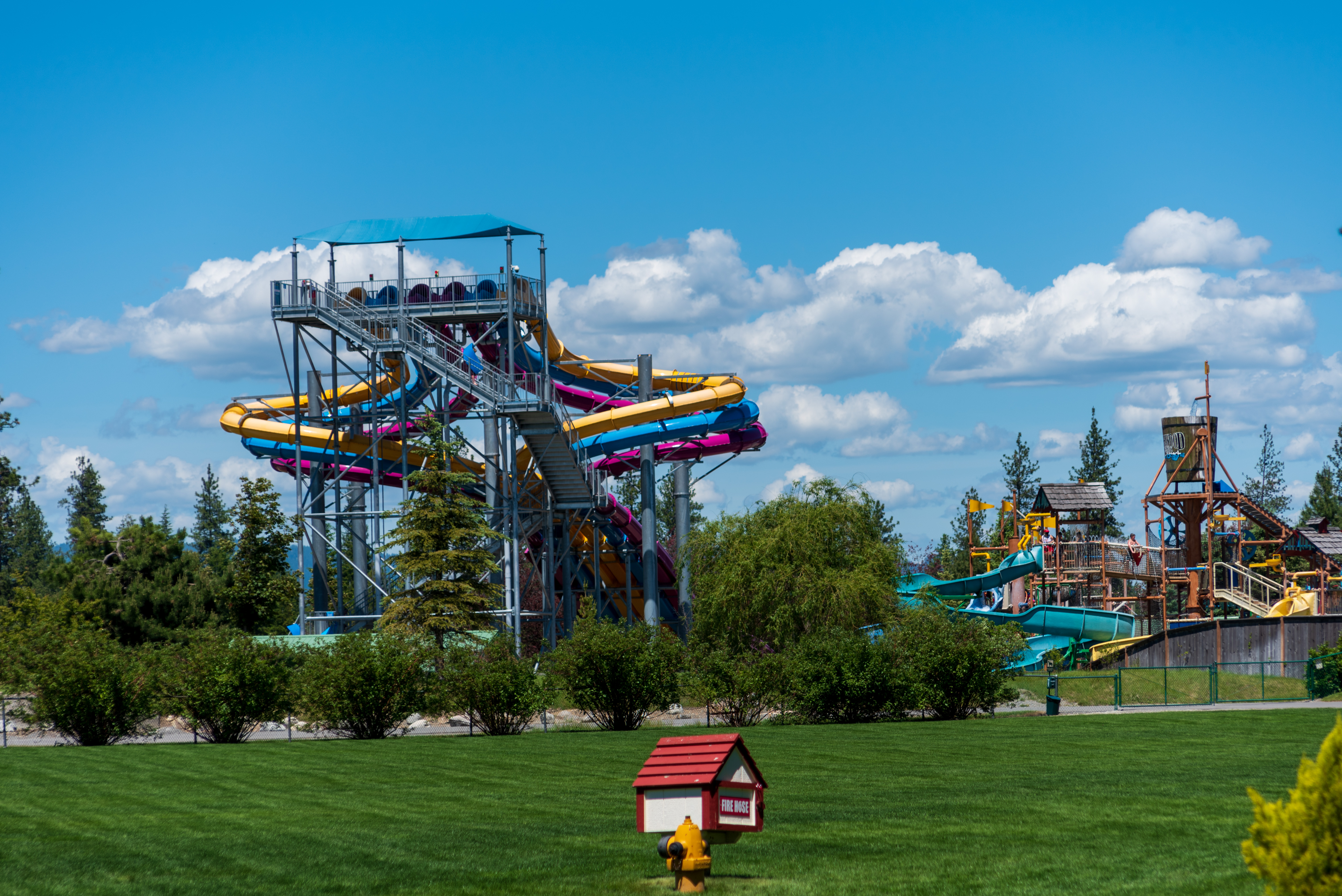
Boulder Beach Water Park

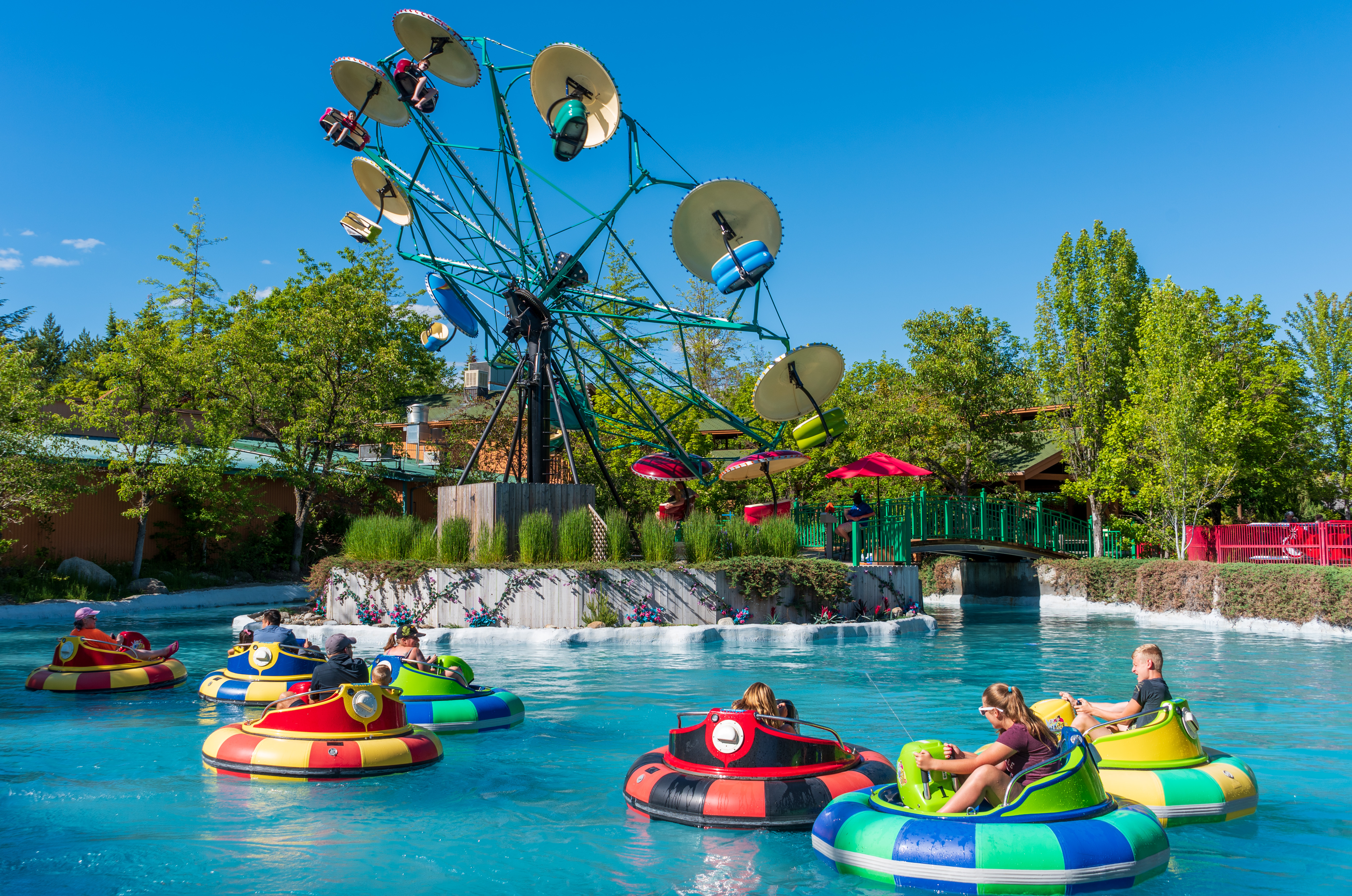
Bumper boats

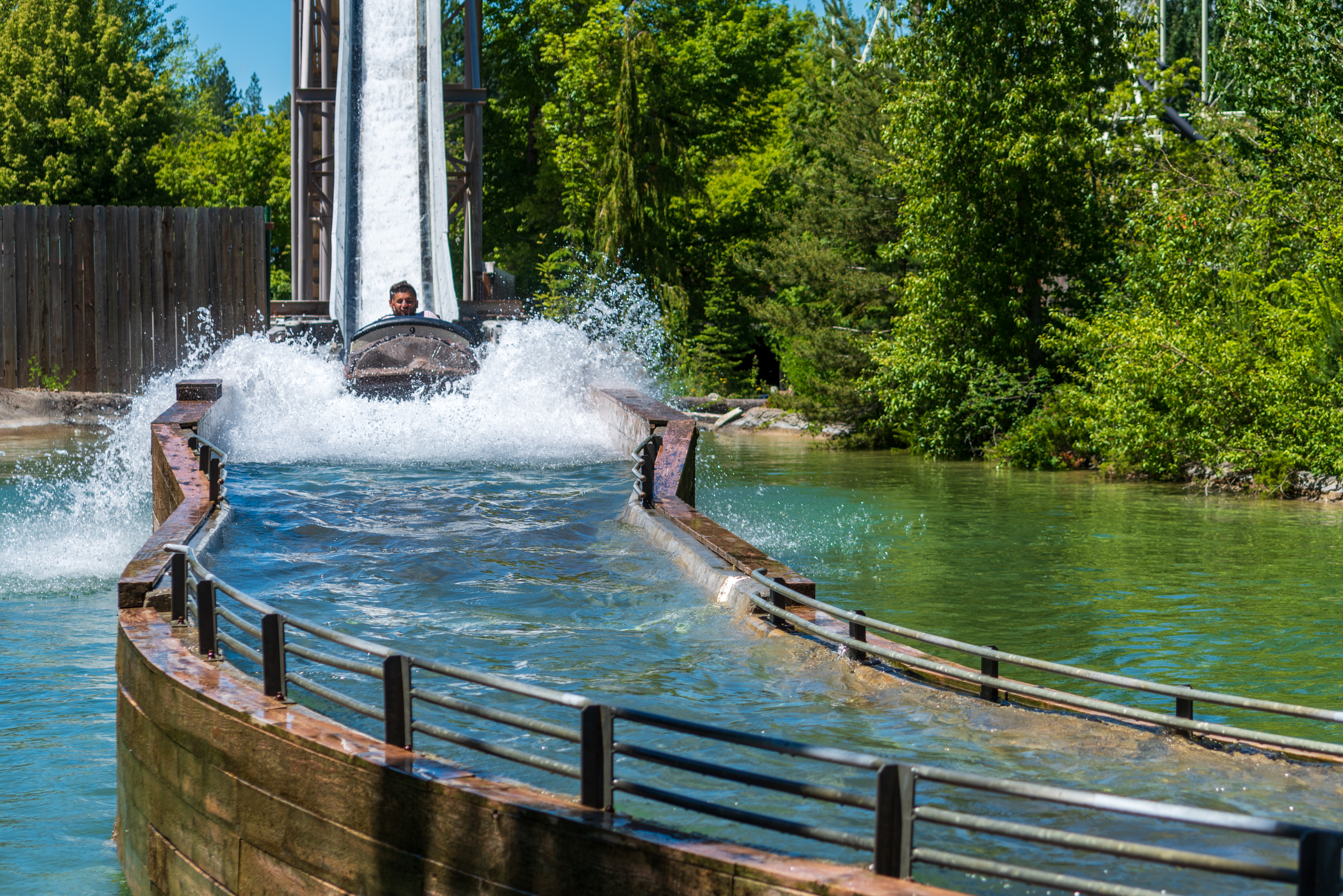
Log Flume

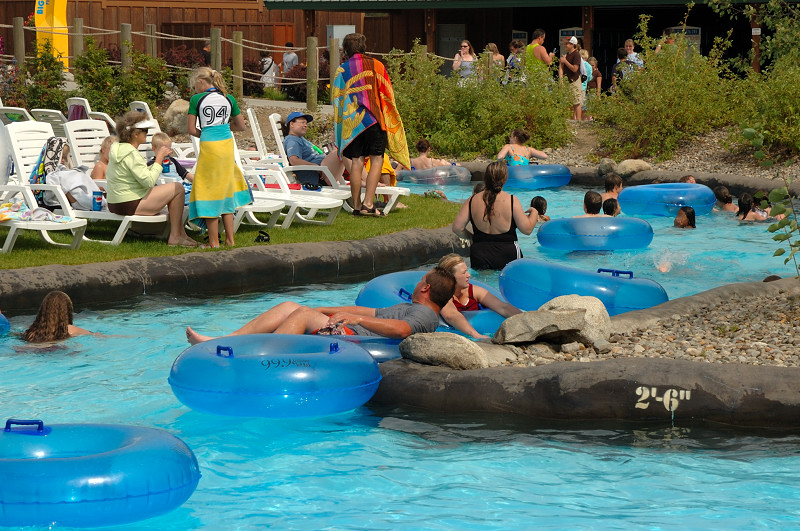
The lazy river of Boulder Beach

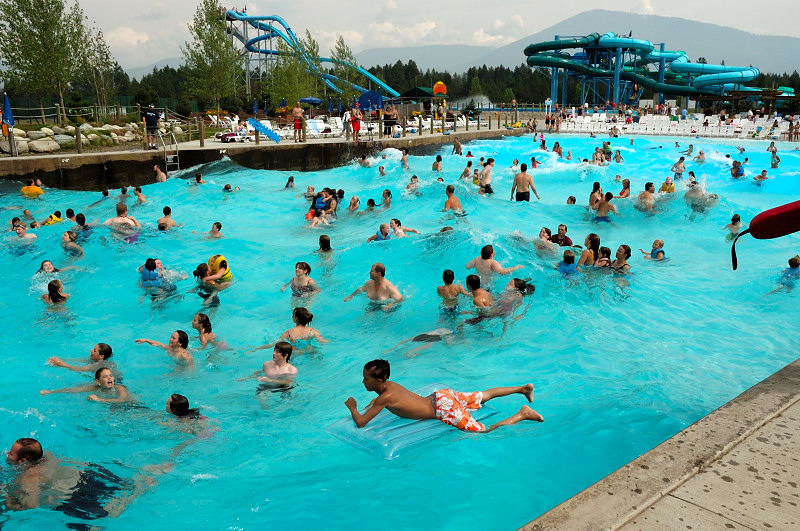
One of the two wave pools in the Boulder Beach Water Park

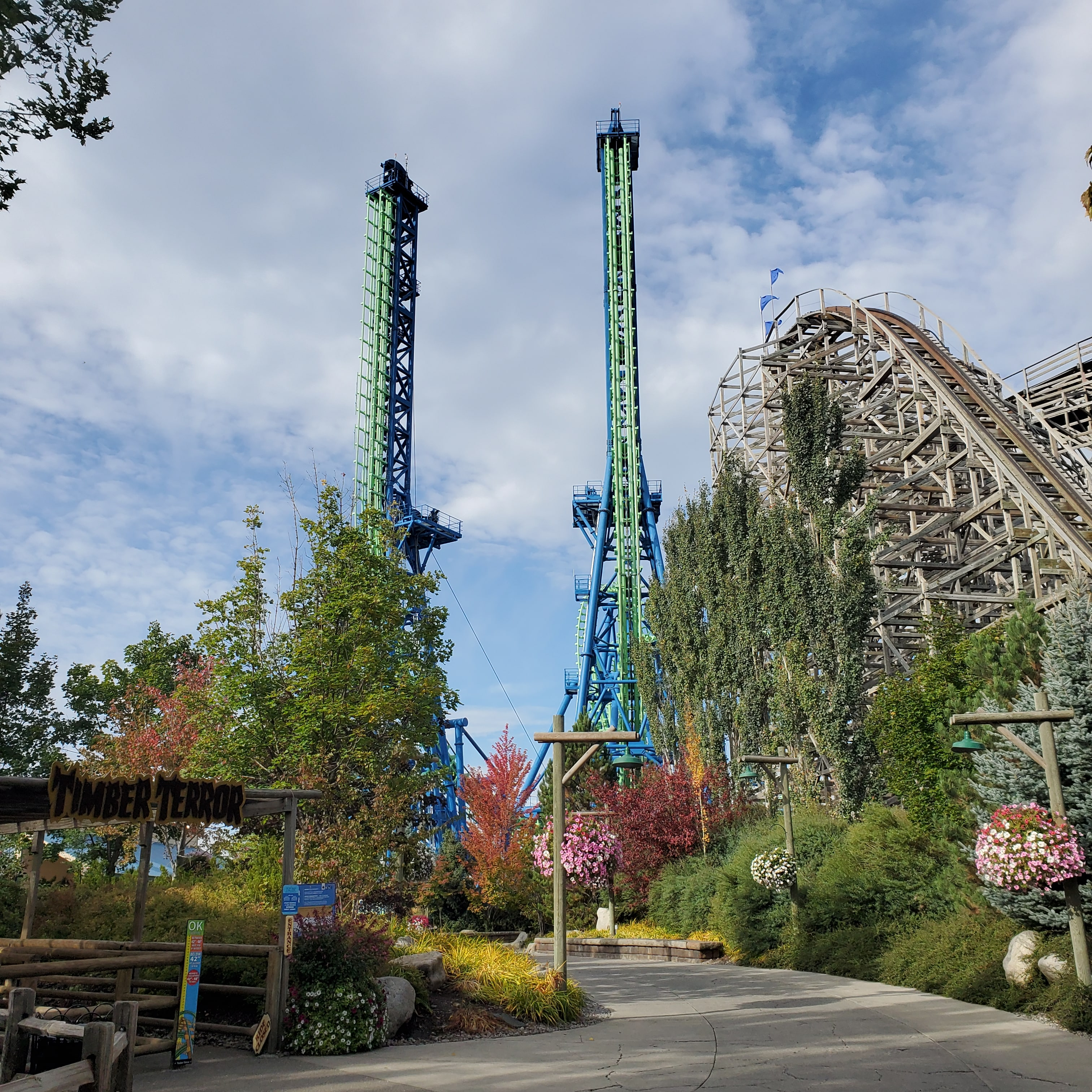
Aftershock at Silverwood, 2021
