= Fire Runner (roller coaster) =

Steel roller coaster in Waterloo, Iowa

Lost Island Theme Park
- Location: Lost Island Theme Park
- Park section: Mura Fire Realm
- Coordinates: 42.4402°N 92.3064°W
- Status: Operating
- Opening date: July 18, 2025

General statistics
- Type: Steel – Single Rail
- Manufacturer: Rocky Mountain Construction
- Model: Custom
- Track layout: Raptor Track
- Lift/launch system: Chain lift hill
- Height: 92 ft (28 m)
- Length: 1,950 ft (590 m)
- Speed: 52 mph (84 km/h)
- Inversions: 3
- Duration: 120 seconds
- Height restriction: 48 in (122 cm)
- Trains: 2 trains with 12 cars; riders arranged 1 across in a single row for a total of 12 riders per train
- Website: Official website
- Fire Runner at RCDB

Fire Runner is a steel roller coaster at Lost Island Theme Park in Waterloo, Iowa. Fire Runner is a Raptor-model single-rail roller coaster manufactured by Rocky Mountain Construction.

Within the park's storyline, the Fire Runner event is the climax of the Cinder Festival, an Olympiad style event held by the Mura Clan that takes the form of a parkour race down the slopes of the volcano and lava fields of the realm and rooftops of parts of the village.

== History ==
On August 16, 2024, the park officially announced Fire Runner, the first single-rail coaster in the Midwest. On July 18, 2025, the park held Fire Runner's media day. The ride officially opened to the public later that day.

On January 2, 2026, Fire Runner received USA Today's 10 BEST Choice Awards 'Best New Theme Park Attraction' award. A flythrough tunnel would be added for the 2026 season.

== Ride experience ==
=== Layout ===
The lava tube entrance of the attraction features a photo-opportunity allowing guests to sit on a throne and be crowned as a Fire Runner champion.

The ride begins by exiting the station and immediately ascending the 92-foot-tall (29m) chain lift hill. The train then does a 180-degree turn and enters the 87-degree drop, diving and reaching a maximum speed of 52 mph (84 km/h), which when viewed from the angle of the park's entry courtyard, gives the illusion of it diving into Mura's volcano. It enters a dive loop and rises up an off-axis airtime hill, followed by an ascending, banked turnaround, where it proceeds into a banked turn to the left. The train drops and immediately traverses a cutback followed by a corkscrew. The finale features a quick dip into an over-banked turn and ends with a small ascent into the brake run.

=== Trains ===
Fire Runner features two, twelve-passenger trains, unlike the trains of its clone, Stunt Pilot, which feature ten-passenger trains. Riders are arranged one across in a single row. The lead train features the sculpted face of Vayla, one of the past champions of the Fire Runner event.
