= Timber Terror =

Amusement ride

- Previously known as Grizzly (1996)
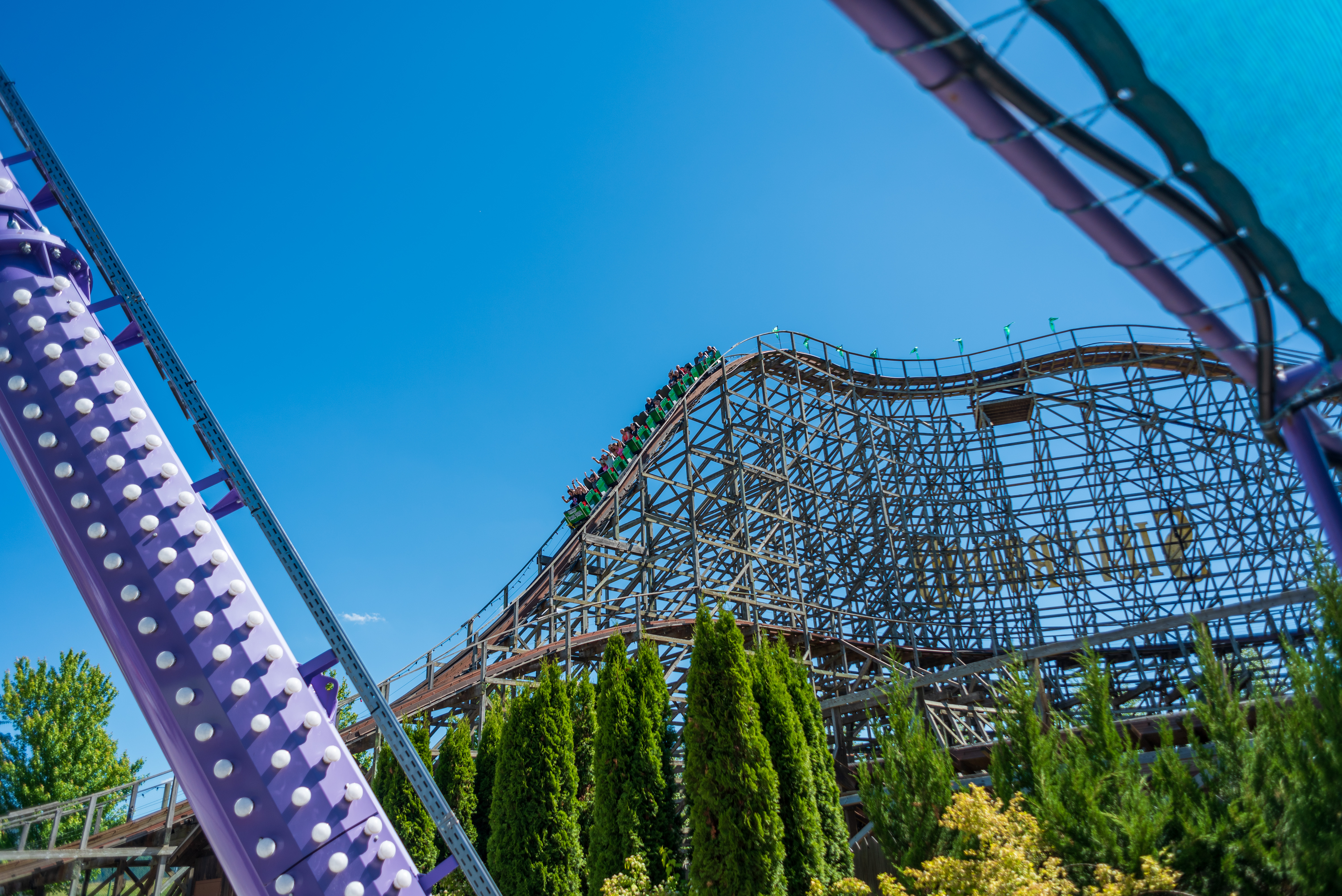

Silverwood Theme Park
- Location: Silverwood Theme Park
- Coordinates: 47°54′16″N 116°42′34″W
- Status: Operating
- Opening date: 1996

General statistics
- Type: Wood
- Manufacturer: Custom Coasters International
- Designer: Gary Norton
- Track layout: Out and Back
- Height: 85 ft (26 m)
- Length: 2,700 ft (820 m)
- Speed: 55 mph (89 km/h)
- Duration: 1:32
- Height restriction: 42 in (107 cm)
- Trains: Unknown number of trains with 6 cars:
- Timber Terror at RCDB

Timber Terror is a wooden roller coaster located at Silverwood Theme Park in Athol, Idaho, United States. The roller coaster opened as Grizzly, but the park had to change the name to Timber Terror in 1997 to avoid litigation and confusion with the wooden roller coasters of the same name at California's Great America and Kings Dominion. Rocky Mountain Construction founder, Fred Grubb, assisted with the initial construction of the ride.

The ride was designed by park owner and founder, Gary Norton. Similar to the park's larger wooden coaster Tremors, the design was finalized by Custom Coasters International and the ride was constructed in-house.

In 2007, Apple released a new version of its Photo Booth application for Macintosh computers as part of Mac OS X "Leopard". This update included looping footage of a portion of the coaster as a novelty video backdrop, which remained part of Photo Booth on every Mac until video backdrops were removed in 2019's release of "Catalina". Even on Catalina, the video of Timber Terror can still be found in its original location in the System folder (within "Compositions," inside the Library folder) on every current Mac computer. Although the backdrop was first released in 2007, the video includes visible "Grizzly" signage indicating it was actually filmed ten years prior in 1996–7.

On September 26, 2010, Timber Terror soft opened to the public with a reversed train as part of the park's annual Scarywood Haunted Nights event. It has run in reverse for Scarywood and the last weekend in September since.

Starting in 2022, Timber Terror has also been partially retracked with RMC 208 RetraK.
