= Wonder Woman Flight of Courage =

Roller coaster at Six Flags Magic Mountain

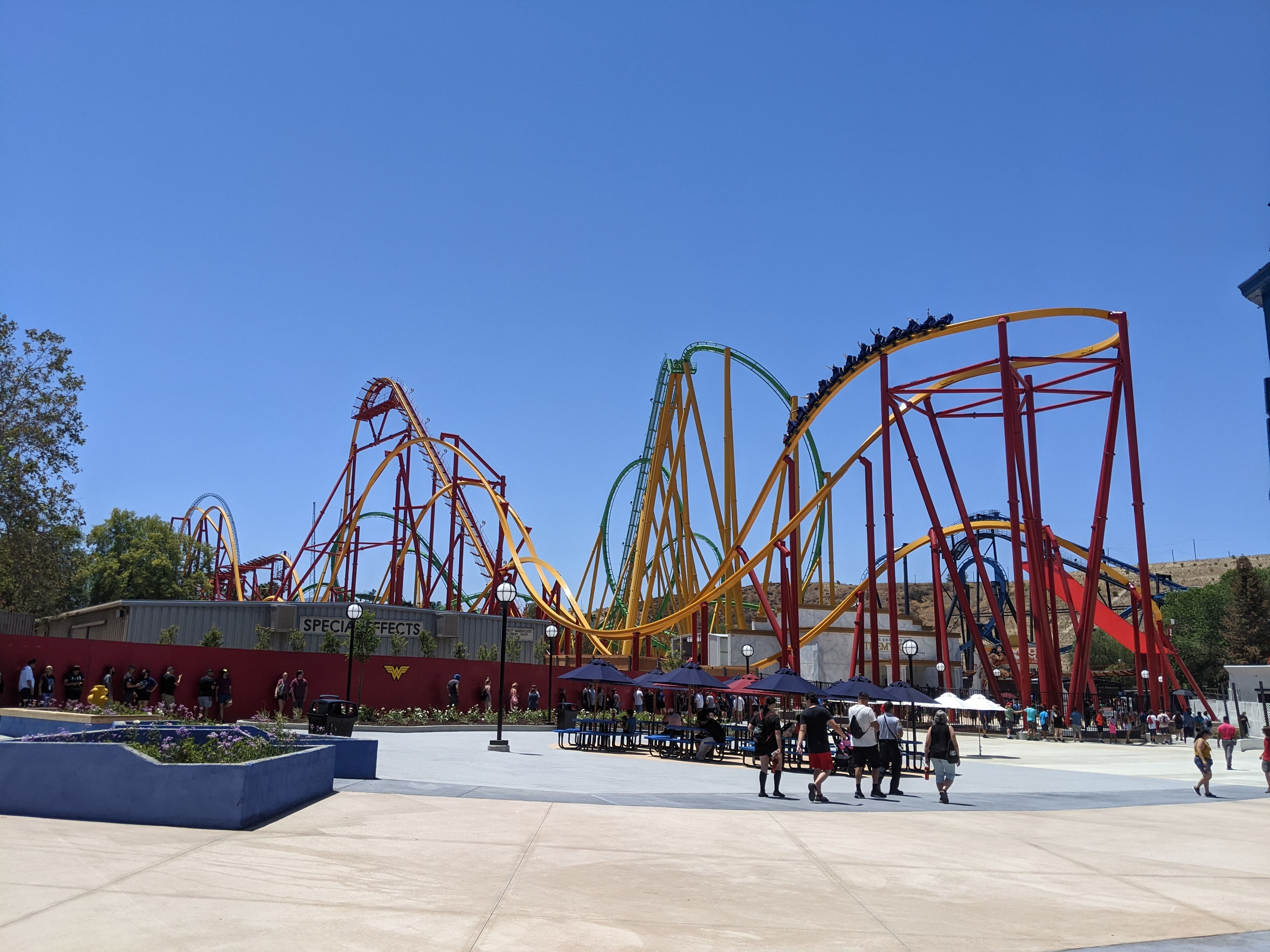

Six Flags Magic Mountain
- Location: Six Flags Magic Mountain
- Park section: DC Universe
- Coordinates: 34.42544966°N 118.5998709°W
- Status: Operating
- Opening date: July 16, 2022
- Replaced: Green Lantern: First Flight; Tidal Wave

General statistics
- Type: Steel – Single-rail
- Manufacturer: Rocky Mountain Construction
- Model: Raptor Track
- Track layout: Custom
- Lift/launch system: Chain lift hill
- Height: 131 ft (40 m)
- Drop: 127 ft (39 m)
- Length: 3,300 ft (1,000 m)
- Speed: 58 mph (93 km/h)
- Inversions: 3
- Max vertical angle: 87°
- Height restriction: 48 in (122 cm)
- Trains: 4 trains with 12 cars. Riders are arranged 1 across in a single row for a total of 12 riders per train.
- Fast Lane available
- Wonder Woman Flight of Courage at RCDB

Wonder Woman Flight of Courage is a Rocky Mountain Construction roller coaster at Six Flags Magic Mountain in Valencia, California. The roller coaster opened on July 16, 2022, as the world's longest and tallest single-rail roller coaster. It features an 87-degree first drop and three inversions and is located in the DC Universe area of the park, which was expanded and remodeled to include a new restaurant and bar, as well as retail locations featuring exclusive DC Comics merchandise.

== History ==
On October 21, 2021, Wonder Woman Flight of Courage was announced by Six Flags Magic Mountain, along with the opening year of 2022. The roller coaster is located at the former site of two attractions; Green Lantern: First Flight and Tidal Wave. The new ride also reuses the former Green Lantern: First Flight station.

Construction of the attraction had begun two months before the announcement in August 2021 with land clearing. Track pieces had already arrived around the same time.

Wonder Woman Flight of Courage opened on July 16, 2022.
