= Tremors (roller coaster) =

Steel roller coaster at Silverwood Theme Park

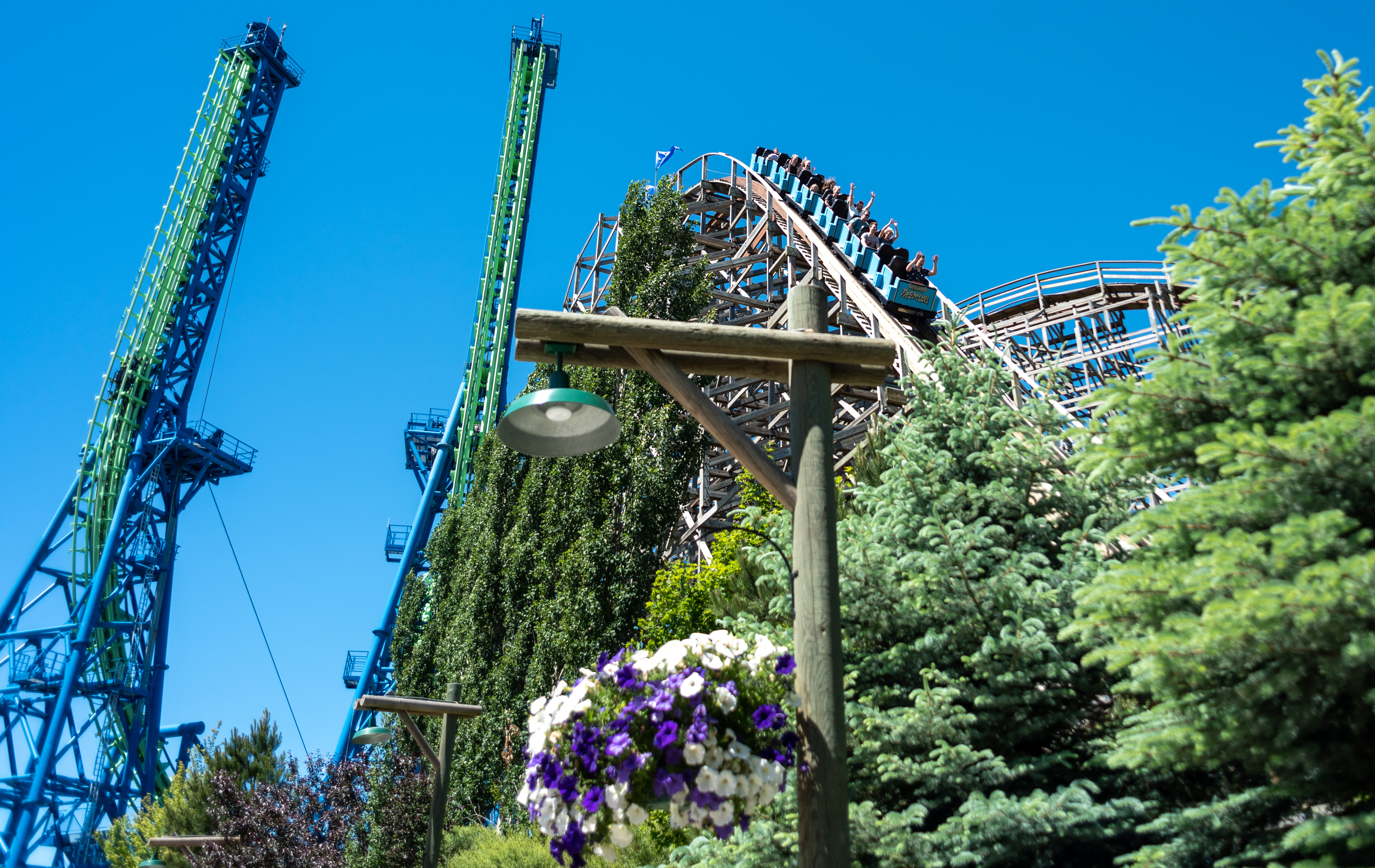
- Tremors’ first drop

Silverwood Theme Park
- Location: Silverwood Theme Park
- Coordinates: 47°54′19″N 116°42′35″W
- Status: Operating
- Opening date: May 15, 1999

General statistics
- Type: Steel
- Manufacturer: Custom Coasters International
- Designer: Alison Brittle, Eden Carpenter, and Gary Norton
- Track layout: Twister
- Lift/launch system: Chain lift hill
- Height: 85 ft (26 m)
- Drop: 99 ft (30 m)
- Length: 3,158 ft (963 m)
- Speed: 50 mph (80 km/h)
- Inversions: 0
- Duration: 1:40
- G-force: 2.5
- Height restriction: 42 in (107 cm)
- Trains: 2 trains with 12 cars; riders arranged 2 across in a single row for a total of 24 riders per train
- Tremors at RCDB

Tremors is a hybrid steel roller coaster located at Silverwood Theme Park in Athol, Idaho. The ride opened in 1999.

== History ==
The initial ride concept was developed by park owner and founder, Gary Norton, after the success of the park's first wooden coaster, Timber Terror. The design was finalized by Custom Coasters International, and the ride was constructed in-house by the park.

Originally themed after the 1990 film of the same name, with the tunnels being built in reference to the movie's worm monsters, Norton later felt the reference would be lost on guests and changed it to a general theme of earthquakes. This theme was later extended to the nearby Aftershock roller coaster when it opened in 2008.

In 2010, the ride was the first to receive Topper Track, a new track system designed by Rocky Mountain Construction (RMC) of Hayden, Idaho. The track, which consists of several layers of wood topped with steel, is designed to cut down on track maintenance and daily wear and tear. RMC's founder, Fred Grubb, had previously assisted with the initial construction of the ride as Silverwood's construction manager.

Starting in 2021, Tremors was also the first coaster to receive RMC's new 208 ReTraK, which is steel track that completely replaces old wood track. In 2025, the last of the ride's wooden track was removed in favor of steel 208 ReTraK. As such, it is no longer considered a wooden coaster.

== Rankings ==
Tremors features four underground tunnels, which gave it the record of most times underground on a roller coaster's layout from 1999 to 2006, when The Voyage opened at Holiday World & Splashin' Safari with five underground tunnels.

Golden Ticket Awards: Top wood Roller Coasters
Year									1998	1999
Ranking									–	–
Year	2000	2001	2002	2003	2004	2005	2006	2007	2008	2009
Ranking	–	19	21	22	11	15	17	16	17	20
Year	2010	2011	2012	2013	2014	2015	2016	2017	2018	2019
Ranking	25	31	21	24	34	32	40	47	–	–
Year	2020	2021	2022	2023	2024	2025	2026			
Ranking	N/A	–	48	–	–	–	–			
