= Rocky Mountain Construction =

American roller coaster manufacturer

Rocky Mountain Coasters
- Type: Private
- Industry: Manufacturing and construction
- Founded: 2001; 25 years ago
- Founder: Fred Grubb and Suanne Dedmon
- Headquarters: Hayden, Idaho, United States
- Area served: Worldwide
- Key people: Dallas Wells (President/CEO); Jake Kilcup (COO)
- Services: Roller coasters, water parks, specialty construction
- Website: www.rockymtnconstruction.com

Rocky Mountain Coasters (RMC), formerly Rocky Mountain Construction, is an American roller coaster manufacturing and construction company based in Hayden, Idaho, United States. It is best known for its I-Box track and Topper Track for wooden roller coasters. Founded by Fred Grubb and Suanne Dedmon in 2001, it has built over 20 roller coasters. In 2023, it merged with amusement ride manufacturer Larson International.

== History ==
In 2001, Rocky Mountain Construction was established by Fred Grubb and Suanne Dedmon. Fred Grubb previously had experience in the construction industry having worked on custom homes and zoo exhibits. The company has worked on several projects including the construction of roller coasters, water parks, steel buildings, miniature golf courses and go kart tracks.

In 2009 Alan Schilke of Ride Centerline began providing design and engineering work for Rocky Mountain Construction. He previously worked with Arrow Dynamics (later S&S Worldwide) to design Tennessee Tornado, Road Runner Express, and X. Working with Rocky Mountain Construction, Schilke and Grubb designed the I-Box track for wooden roller coasters. The first installation of this track technology debuted on New Texas Giant at Six Flags Over Texas in 2011.

In late 2011, Schilke announced that the company would be working on two projects throughout 2012 which would both open in 2013. These were later revealed to be an I-Box retrack of The Rattler at Six Flags Fiesta Texas and a new roller coaster designed from scratch at Silver Dollar City named Outlaw Run. The track technology used for Outlaw Run, which allows a square beam of wood to be twisted, took 4 years to develop. It allows Rocky Mountain Construction to design layouts with maneuvers that are not traditionally possible with wooden roller coasters such as heartline rolls. Grubb has stated the technology could be used for new elements in the future. Some new elements were realized with the announcement of Goliath at Six Flags Great America. The ride features an 85 degree drop as well as a dive loop and a zero-g stall. The ride opened in June 2014.

In 2013, Rocky Mountain Construction signed a deal with Dutch amusement ride firm Vekoma. The agreement allows Vekoma to sell Rocky Mountain Construction's roller coasters outside the North American market. In 2014, Kolmården Wildlife Park in Sweden announced plans to build the first Rocky Mountain coaster in Europe called Wildfire, which opened on June 28, 2016. To handle increased demand, Rocky Mountain Construction opened a new factory, twice the size of their existing one, in August 2014.

In a press release on April 11, 2023, amusement ride manufacturer Larson International, known for its Fire Ball models, merged with Rocky Mountain Construction.

== Technology ==
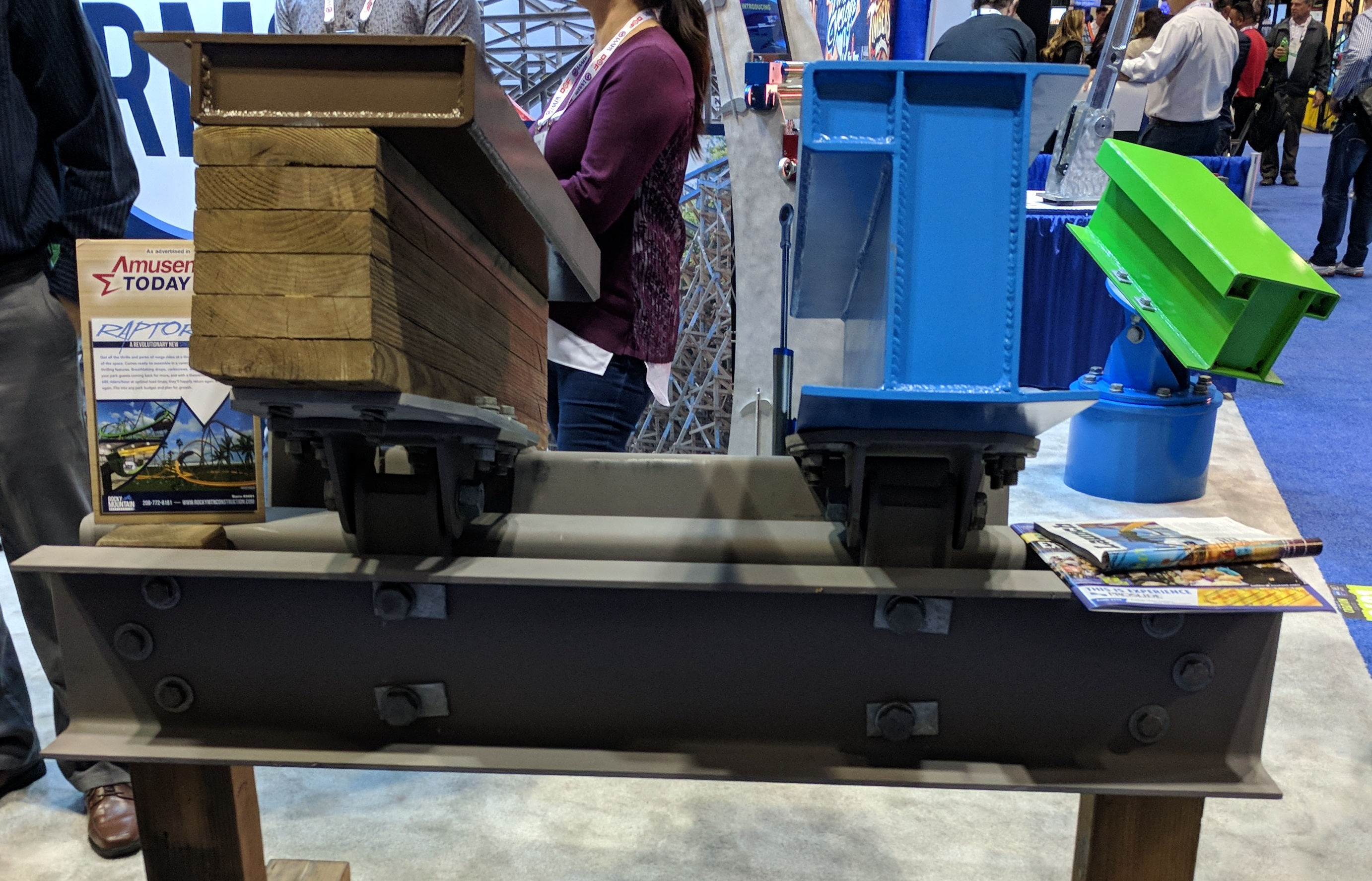
Topper Track (left) and I-Box Track (right) display at Rocky Mountain Construction's booth at IAAPA IAE 2017, with the Raptor Track display behind them to the right

- I-Box Track (also known as Iron Horse Track): Rocky Mountain Construction's most common product. A formation of replacement steel track for wooden roller coasters. The first installation of this track was on Texas Giant at Six Flags Over Texas.
- I-Box (Large Track Version): Specifically designed to run the S&S Free Spin 4D coaster clones.
- Topper Track: Installed on several coasters around the United States. The track is designed to reduce the maintenance required for a wooden roller coaster and provide a smoother ride experience. This grout-filled, running steel track replaces the upper layers of laminated wood.
- Wooden roller coaster trains: specifically designed to run on the company's own Topper Track, however, they could be added to other wooden roller coasters as well. The trains feature steel wheels as opposed to polyurethane wheels found on most trains.
- 208 ReTrak: Debuting in 2021 on Silverwood's Tremors roller coaster, similar to the I-Box track, 208 is designed to be used as a replacement for sections of old wooden coasters to decrease maintenance and add lifespan to the coaster as well as increase rider comfort and enjoyment.
- Wild Moose: A version of the classic wild mouse coaster type using I-Box track, featuring entirely redesigned trains and a compact layout and its first will be Forbidden Lair at Lost Island.
- Raptor Track: A single rail steel track that features inline seating for passengers.
- T-Rex Track: Similar to Raptor track, the T-Rex track is a single rail track. It is a larger single rail model that permits two seat-wide trains on the track rather than one.
- Swing Axle Trains: Debuting in 2018 on Twisted Timbers, the Swing axle train features a pivoting front axle allowing for smoother transitions between elements.

== List of roller coasters ==
As of January 2026, Rocky Mountain Construction has built or refurbished 29 roller coasters around the world. As of 2026, 28 of them are currently operating.

Name	Model	Park	Country	Converted From	Opened	Status	Ref	Image
New Texas Giant	I-Box - Steel	Six Flags Over Texas	United States	Texas Giant	2011	Operating		
Outlaw Run	Topper Track - Wood	Silver Dollar City	United States	N/A	2013	Operating		
Iron Rattler	I-Box - Steel	Six Flags Fiesta Texas	United States	Rattler	2013	Operating		
Medusa Steel Coaster	I-Box - Steel	Six Flags Mexico	Mexico	Medusa	2014	Operating		
Goliath	Topper Track - Wood	Six Flags Great America	United States	N/A	2014	Operating		
Twisted Colossus	I-Box - Steel	Six Flags Magic Mountain	United States	Colossus	2015	Operating		
Wicked Cyclone	I-Box - Steel	Six Flags New England	United States	Cyclone	2015	Operating		
Wildfire	Topper Track - Wood	Kolmården	Sweden	N/A	2016	Operating		
Wind Chaser; Formerly Storm Chaser	I-Box - Steel	Kentucky Kingdom	United States	Twisted Twins	2016	Operating		
The Joker	I-Box - Steel	Six Flags Discovery Kingdom	United States	ROAR	2016	Operating		
Lightning Rod	Topper Track & I-Box - Wood & steel	Dollywood	United States	N/A	2016	Operating		
Twisted Timbers	I-Box - Steel	Kings Dominion	United States	Hurler	2018	Operating		
Steel Vengeance	I-Box - Steel	Cedar Point	United States	Mean Streak	2018	Operating		
Twisted Cyclone	I-Box - Steel	Six Flags Over Georgia	United States	Georgia Cyclone	2018	Operating		
Wonder Woman Golden Lasso Coaster	Raptor Track - Steel	Six Flags Fiesta Texas	United States	N/A	2018	Operating		
RailBlazer	Raptor Track - Steel	California's Great America	United States	N/A	2018	Operating		
Hakugei	I-Box - Steel	Nagashima Spa Land	Japan	White Cyclone	2019	Operating		Hybrid_Coaster_Hakugei
Untamed	I-Box - Steel	Walibi Holland	Netherlands	Robin Hood	2019	Operating		
Zadra	I-Box - Steel	Energylandia	Poland	N/A	2019	Operating		
Stunt Pilot	Raptor Track - Steel	Silverwood Theme Park	United States	N/A	2021	Operating		
Jersey Devil Coaster	Raptor Track - Steel	Six Flags Great Adventure	United States	N/A	2021	Operating		
Iron Gwazi	I-Box - Steel	Busch Gardens Tampa Bay	United States	Gwazi	2022	Operating		
Wonder Woman Flight of Courage	Raptor Track - Steel	Six Flags Magic Mountain	United States	N/A	2022	Operating		
Wildcat's Revenge	I-Box - Steel	Hersheypark	United States	Wildcat	2023	Operating		
Fire in the Hole	I-Box - Steel	Silver Dollar City	United States	N/A	2024	Operating		
Sköll & Hati	Raptor Track - Steel	Gyeongju World	South Korea	N/A	2024	Operating		
Fire Runner	Raptor Track - Steel	Lost Island Theme Park	United States	N/A	2025	Operating		
YoY	Raptor Track - Steel	Walibi Holland	Netherlands	N/A	2025	Operating		
Dark Tides	Raptor Track - Steel	Family Kingdom	United States	N/A	2027	Under Construction		
Forbidden Lair	Wild Moose - Steel	Lost Island Theme Park	United States	N/A	2027	Under Construction		
ArieForce One	I-Box - Steel	Six Flags Magic Mountain; Fun Spot Atlanta	United States	N/A	2028; 2023 to 2026	Under Construction		
Unknown	I-Box - Steel	Walibi Belgium	Belgium	Loup-Garou	2028	Under Construction		

== Other projects ==
=== Topper Track, no layout changes ===
- Tremors at Silverwood Theme Park

=== Construction ===
- Aftershock at Silverwood Theme Park
- Corkscrew at Silverwood Theme Park
- El Toro at Six Flags Great Adventure
- T Express at Everland
- Timber Terror at Silverwood Theme Park
- Tremors at Silverwood Theme Park
- Villain at Geauga Lake
- Timberhawk at Wild Waves Theme Park

=== Repairs ===
- Texas Giant at Six Flags Over Texas
- The Rattler at Six Flags Fiesta Texas
- Medusa at Six Flags Mexico
- Hoosier Hurricane at Indiana Beach
- Hurricane: Category 5 at Myrtle Beach Pavilion
- Mega Zeph at Six Flags New Orleans
- The Predator at Six Flags Darien Lake
- Psyclone at Six Flags Magic Mountain
- Shivering Timbers at Michigan's Adventure - 208 ReTrak
- Timber Terror at Silverwood Theme Park
- Tremors at Silverwood Theme Park - 208 ReTrak
- Twister II at Elitch Gardens Theme Park
- Twisted Twins at Kentucky Kingdom
- Hurler at Kings Dominion
- Blazing Fury at Dollywood
- Hell Cat at Clementon Park - 208 ReTrak

=== Miscellaneous ===
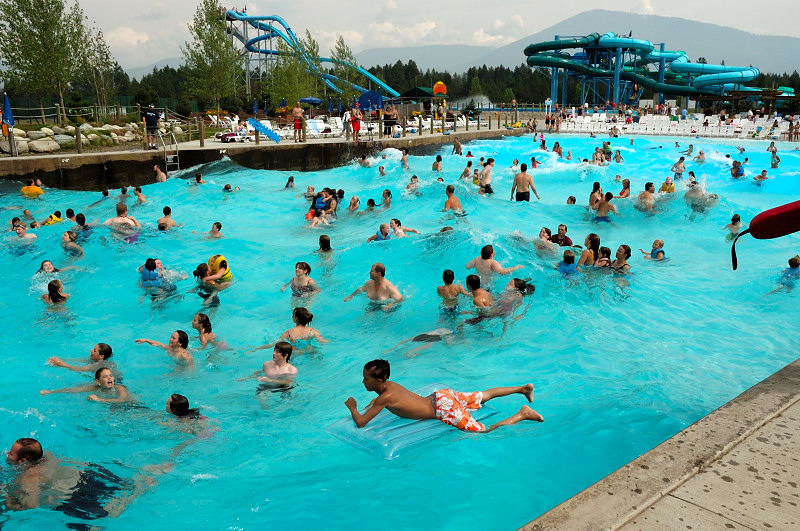
The wave pool at Boulder Beach was constructed by Rocky Mountain Construction

- Boulder Beach – water park
- Great Escape – Skycoaster installation
- Six Flags America – Skycoaster installation
- Six Flags Discovery Kingdom – Skycoaster installation
- S&S Free Spin 4D clones - Construction of the track using the I-Box Large Version
- Kentucky Kingdom – Skycoaster installation
- Stoneridge Resort – miniature golf course
- Triple Play Indoor Water Park – water park
- Utah Olympic Park – Xtreme ZipRiders
- Wild Water West – water park, go kart track and miniature golf course
