= Giant Inverted Boomerang =

Steel roller coaster

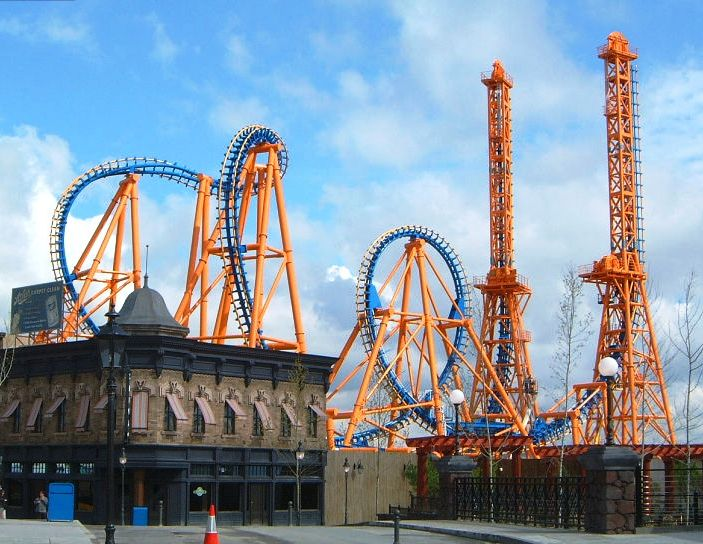
- Stunt Fall at Parque Warner Madrid
- Status: In production
- First manufactured: 2001
- No. of installations: 6
- Manufacturer: Vekoma
- Height: 59 m (194 ft)
- Drop: 54 m (177 ft)
- Length: 367 m (1,204 ft)
- Speed: 105.6 km/h (65.6 mph)
- Capacity: 870 riders per hour
- Vehicles: 1
- Riders per vehicle: 32
- Rows: 8
- Riders per row: 4
- Duration: About 1:32 minutes
- Restraint Style: Over-the-shoulder
- Giant Inverted Boomerang at RCDB

A Giant Inverted Boomerang is a type of steel shuttle roller coaster manufactured by the Dutch firm Vekoma. The ride is a larger, inverted version of Vekoma's popular Boomerang sit down roller coasters. As of November 2026, three installations of the model are operating.

== History ==
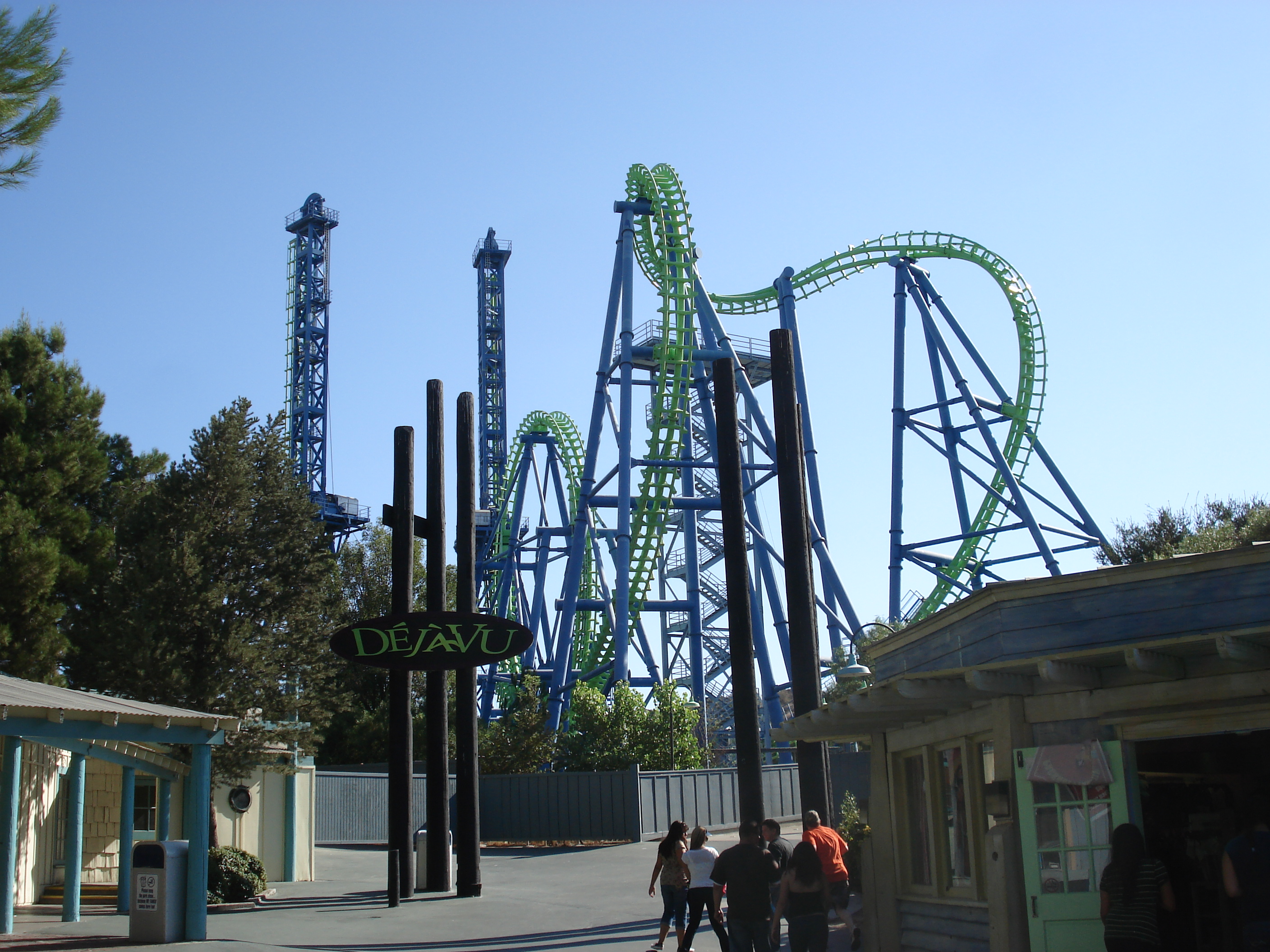
Goliath when it was originally at Six Flags Magic Mountain as Déjà Vu from 2001 to 2011

Giant Inverted Boomerangs were slated to open for the start of the 2001 season at three Six Flags parks. Sudden errors and malfunctions during testing delayed these. The first to open was Déjà Vu at Six Flags Magic Mountain on August 25, 2001. Déjà Vu at Six Flags Magic Mountain has since been removed and relocated to Six Flags New England as Goliath. This was followed by the opening of a further two Giant Inverted Boomerangs named Déjà Vu on September 1, 2001, at Six Flags Over Georgia and on October 7, 2001, at Six Flags Great America. The opening of the fourth Giant Inverted Boomerang was delayed even more after the problems were discovered with the first three. Stunt Fall opened on August 8, 2002, at Parque Warner Madrid (then known as Warner Bros. Movie World Madrid).

In 2007, Six Flags announced the removal of Déjà Vu from both Six Flags Over Georgia and Six Flags Great America. They announced that the Six Flags Over Georgia ride would be replaced with a new themed area called Thomas Town (since rethemed to Whistlestop Park). After the Six Flags Great America ride gave its last rides on October 28, 2007, it was removed and replaced with the Buccaneer Battle ride.

In January 2008, Silverwood Theme Park in Idaho announced on its website that it would install the Déjà Vu from Six Flags Great America with a projected opening date of July that year. They later announced Déjà Vu would operate as Aftershock. Before opening at its new location, the ride was overhauled by Vekoma in order to make the ride more reliable. The ride officially opened July 21, 2008. Rocky Mountain Construction, an Idaho-based manufacturing firm, assisted with the construction of the ride.

In November 2009 it was announced that Mirabilandia in Brazil had purchased Six Flags Over Georgia's Déjà Vu. The ride was to be renamed to Sky Mountain, but it never opened as the park closed permanently.

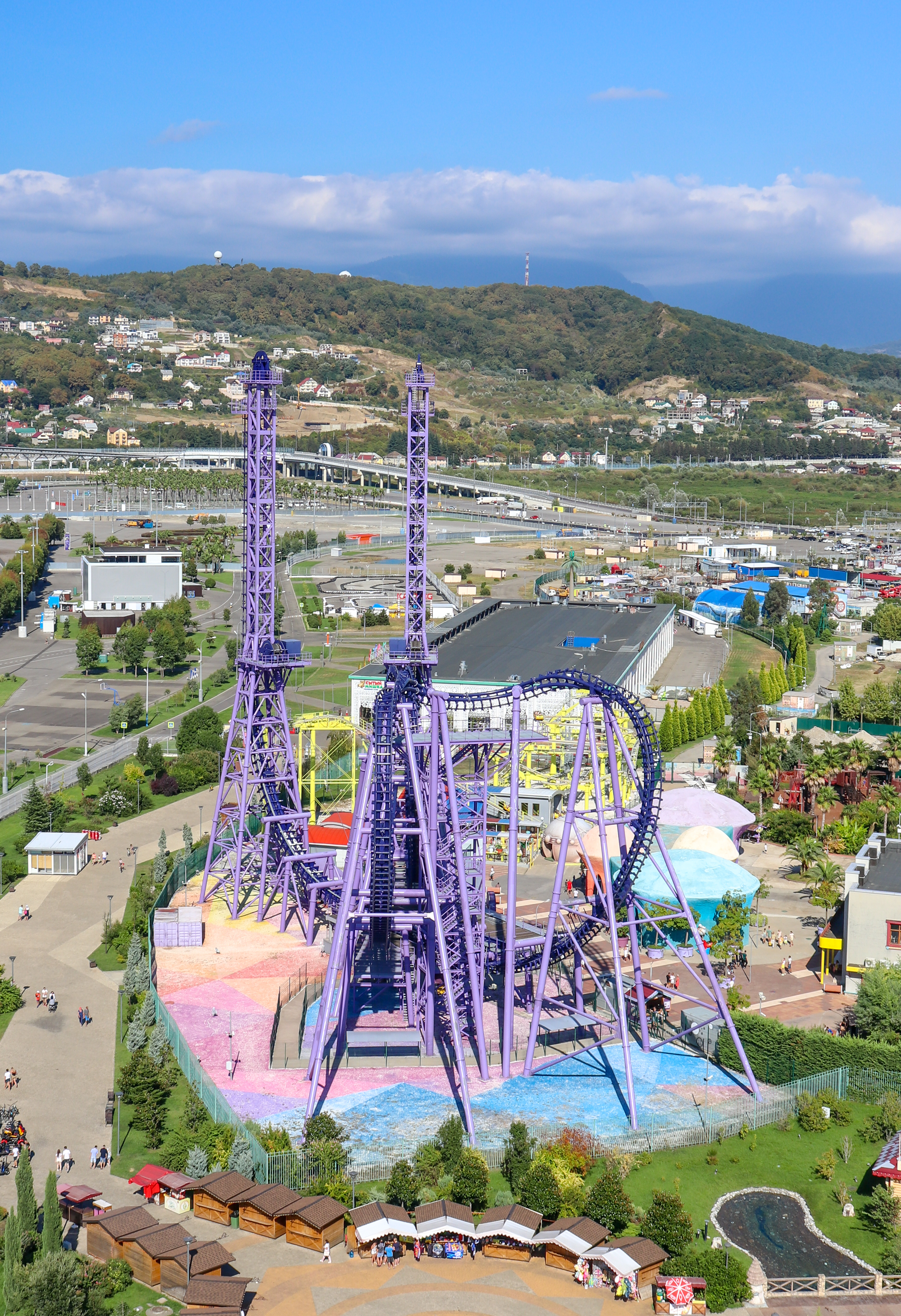
Quantum Leap at Sochi Park, 2020

On August 16, 2011, Masslive reported that Six Flags New England was planning on building a Giant Inverted Boomerang for the park's 2012 season where the Shipwreck Falls attraction was located. On August 18, 2011, the ride was approved by the Agawam Planning Board, with the Los Angeles Times confirming one day later that Déjà Vu from Six Flags Magic Mountain would be relocated to Six Flags New England and would begin operation under a new name in 2012. An official announcement from Six Flags representatives was made on September 1, 2011, confirming previous reports and announcing that the relocated ride's name would be Goliath. On October 16, 2011, Déjà Vu operated for the final time. At around the same time, Shipwreck Falls was removed from Six Flags New England to make way for Goliath. Goliath at Six Flags New England was topped off on February 29, 2012. Goliath opened to the public on May 25, 2012.

In 2011, the first new Giant Inverted Boomerang since 2002 was constructed. Jinjiang Action Park opened the aptly named Giant Inverted Boomerang in September 2011. This ride closed permanently with the park in early 2025. In 2014, Sochi Park Adventureland opened Quantum Leap, another Giant Inverted Boomerang.

Goliath was SBNO for a majority of the 2021 season until it began demolition later that year.

== Installations ==
Coaster name	Amusement park	Opening date	Status
Aftershock; Formerly Déjà Vu	Silverwood Theme Park; Six Flags Great America	July 21, 2008; October 7, 2001	Operating; Closed on October 28, 2007
Deja Vu	Mirabilandia (Never Opened); Six Flags Over Georgia	September 1, 2001	Removed; Closed in October 2007
Mountain Peak	Jinjiang Action Park	September 30, 2011	Removed; Closed in January 25, 2025
Goliath; Formerly Déjà Vu	Six Flags New England; Six Flags Magic Mountain	May 25, 2012; August 25, 2001	Removed; Closed on October 16, 2021
Stunt Fall	Parque Warner Madrid	August 8, 2002	Operating
Quantum Leap	Sochi Park Adventureland	2014	Standing But Not Operating

== Ride ==
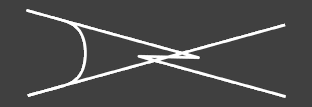
The basic track layout of a Giant Inverted Boomerang.

=== Layout and design ===
The Giant Inverted Boomerang is a departure from Vekoma's earlier Boomerang designs. This model features a vertical cable lift hill that quickly lifts the train up a vertical tower. Also, this model is larger than previous Boomerang designs. From above, the track layout looks like an 'X'.

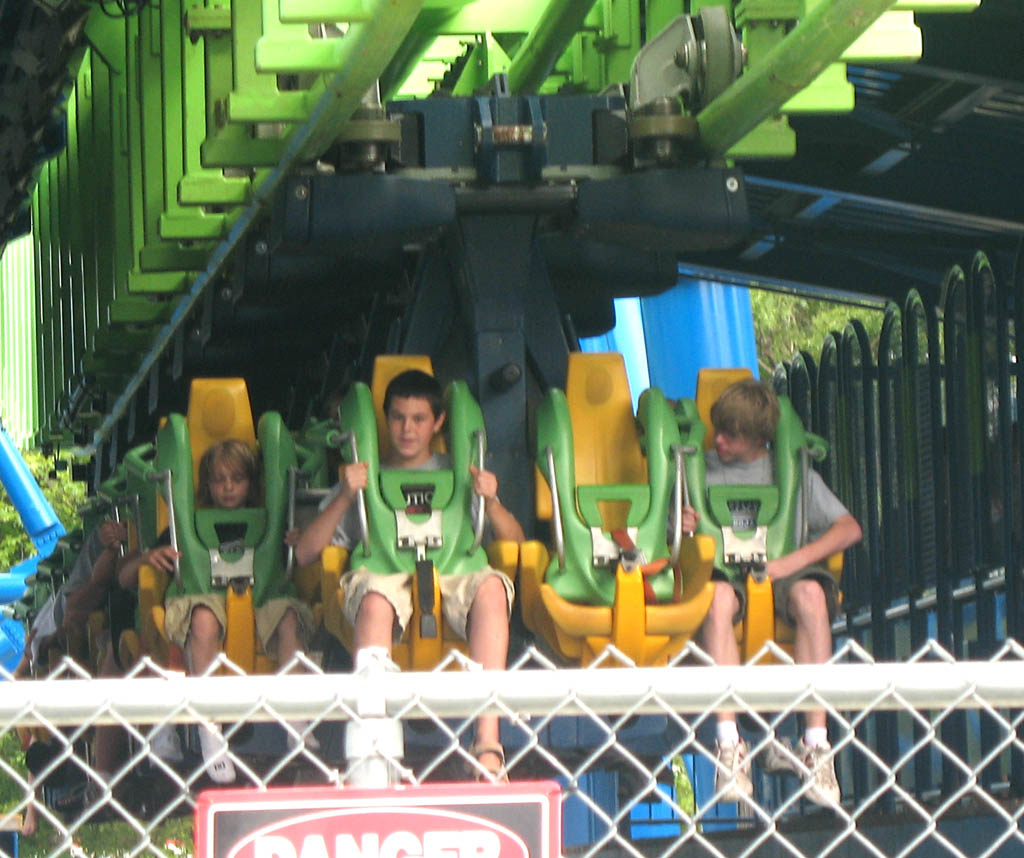
The chevron seating shown on the Great America ride.

=== Train ===
As a Giant Inverted Boomerang is a shuttle roller coaster, each installation only operates with a single train of eight cars, each utilizing four-across seating, similar to that on Bolliger & Mabillard's inverted roller coasters. Giant Inverted Boomerang seats are staggered such that the outside seats are pushed back slightly behind the middle two seats in each row. The train seats a total of 32 riders.

Goliath at Six Flags New England featured a new train by Premier Rides (different from the originals built by Vekoma). This train had four-across seating, similar to Bolliger & Mabillard's inverted roller coasters. The new train design was chosen in an attempt to make the lines in the station less complicated to navigate and also to give the ride a higher capacity.

=== Experience ===
The ride begins when the train slowly backs out of the station and up the vertical lift, pulled by a catch car. Once reaching the top of the lift, with riders facing straight down, and their legs dangling in the air, the train is released and zooms through the station heading into a 110-foot (34 m) tall boomerang. This element contains two of the three inversions found on the ride going forward. After twisting through the Boomerang, riders then go through a 102-foot (31 m) tall vertical loop which crosses over the station and hit the second vertical tower of the ride. A catch car there pulls the train up the second vertical tower, this time with riders facing the sky. After the train reaches the top of the tower, it is released to cycle backward through the layout. The train then goes through the station and heads up the first vertical lift again, where it is caught once more by the catch car and then very slowly lowered back into the station.

== Ed Markey analysis ==
After the announcement of Goliath on September 1, 2011, U.S. Representative Ed Markey, with S.I. Sheikh and A.B. Singhal from the Massachusetts General Hospital, told The Boston Herald: “Fixed-site amusement park rides like those at Six Flags New England are exempt from federal oversight due to a 30-year-old special-interest loophole. This means that even as these rides get faster and taller, safety rules remain stuck in a state-by-state patchwork that leaves riders vulnerable. Also, the jerky motions of these rides have been linked to small tears in arteries or a spike in blood pressure, but we aren’t sure if there is necessarily a cause-and-effect relationship.”

== See also ==
- 2011 in amusement parks
- 2012 in amusement parks
