= Wonder Woman Golden Lasso Coaster =

Roller coaster at Six Flags Fiesta Texas

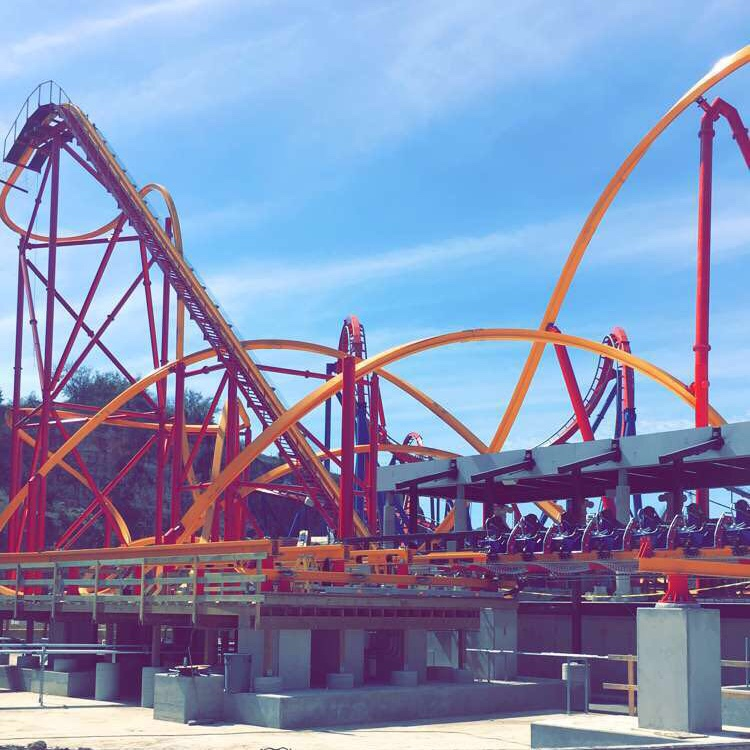

Six Flags Fiesta Texas
- Location: Six Flags Fiesta Texas
- Park section: Rockville
- Coordinates: 29.5951°N 98.6085°W
- Status: Operating
- Opening date: May 12, 2018
- Replaced: Power Surge

General statistics
- Type: Steel
- Manufacturer: Rocky Mountain Construction
- Designer: Alan Schilke
- Model: Raptor – Prototype
- Track layout: Single rail
- Lift/launch system: Chain lift hill
- Height: 113 ft (34 m)
- Drop: 100 ft (30 m)
- Length: 1,800 ft (550 m)
- Speed: 52 mph (84 km/h)
- Inversions: 3
- Max vertical angle: 90°
- Capacity: 600 riders per hour
- Height restriction: 48 in (122 cm)
- Trains: 3 trains with 8 cars; riders arranged 1 across in a single row for a total of 8 riders per train
- Website: Official website
- Fast Lane available
- Wonder Woman Golden Lasso Coaster at RCDB

Wonder Woman Golden Lasso Coaster is a steel roller coaster at Six Flags Fiesta Texas, built by Rocky Mountain Construction and opened on May 12, 2018. The roller coaster is themed to the DC Comics character, Wonder Woman. It was one of two prototype single-rail coasters to open in 2018, the other being RailBlazer at California's Great America, which has a mirror-image layout to the Wonder Woman Golden Lasso Coaster.

== History ==
Six Flags Fiesta Texas announced the closure of Power Surge in mid-summer 2017. Power Surge was closed on July 23, 2017. The park began teasing a new attraction for the 2018 season and on August 3, 2017, the park officially announced a first of its kind roller coaster, introducing the new Rocky Mountain Construction single-rail coaster concept.

The roller coaster was originally planned to open on March 10, 2018, with a soft opening a week prior for an added bonus to the park's inaugural Botánica Music Festival. However, it was delayed twice until opening in May.

The coaster closed on July 5th 2023 for a 2-phase refurbishment. The ride is set to reopen in late 2023 once phase 1 of the refurbishment is complete, but will close again in 2024 where the coaster will receive new trains.

== Ride experience ==
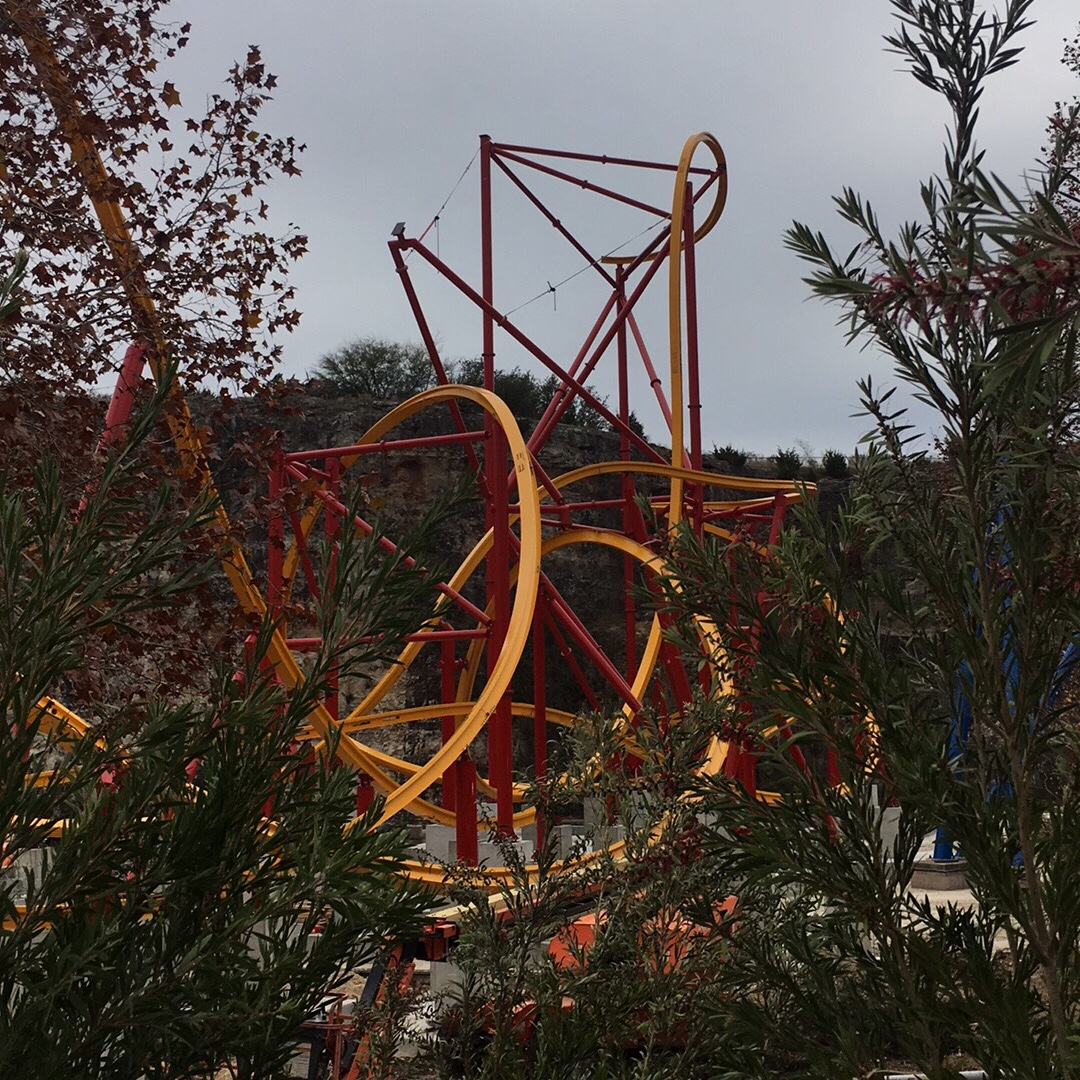
Wonder Woman Golden Lasso Coaster in construction

The ride begins by exiting the continuously moving station and ascending a 113 feet (34 m) tall chain lift. The train then banks right making a 180 degree turn and entering a 100 feet (30 m) tall 90 degree drop, diving and reaching a maximum speed of 52 miles per hour (84 km/h) before entering by a dive loop. The train then rises up to the left into an airtime hill and then drop again, entering a hill followed by several turns. After the turns it drops and turns into a cutback, followed by a corkscrew. The train finally goes through an over-banked turn to the right before hitting the brake run.
