= RailBlazer =

Steel roller coaster at California's Great America

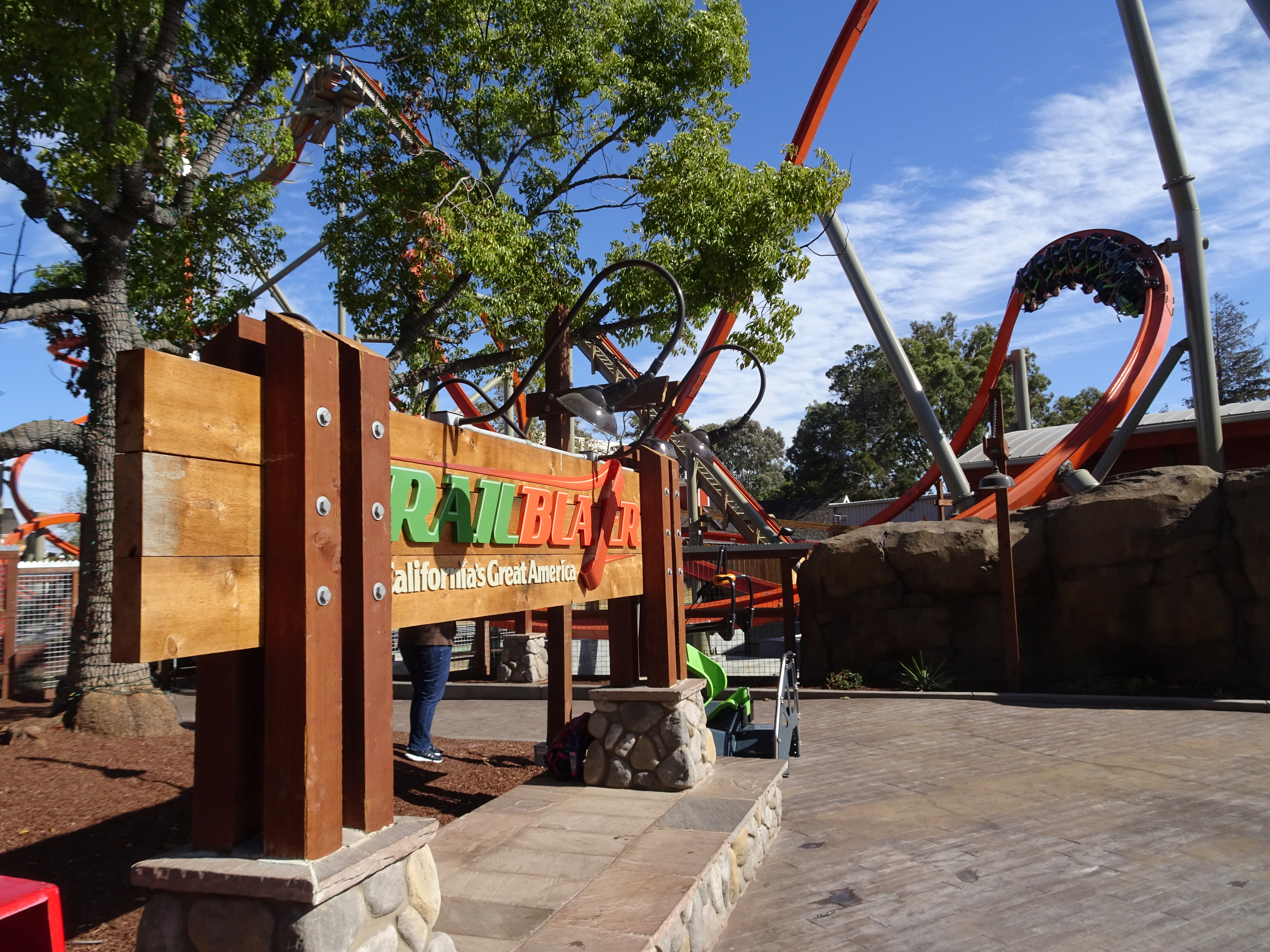
- RailBlazer's entrance

California's Great America
- Location: California's Great America
- Park section: NorCal County Fair
- Coordinates: 37.3951°N 121.9737°W
- Status: Operating
- Soft opening date: June 9, 2018
- Opening date: June 14, 2018
- Replaced: Invertigo

General statistics
- Type: Steel
- Manufacturer: Rocky Mountain Construction
- Designer: Alan Schilke
- Model: Raptor - Prototype (Mirror)
- Lift/launch system: Chain lift hill
- Height: 105 ft (32 m)
- Drop: 100 ft (30 m)
- Length: 1,800 ft (550 m)
- Speed: 52 mph (84 km/h)
- Inversions: 3
- Max vertical angle: 90°
- Capacity: 600 riders per hour
- Height restriction: 48 in (122 cm)
- Trains: 3 trains with 8 cars; riders arranged 1 across in a single row for a total of 8 riders per train
- Website: Official website
- Fast Lane available
- Single rider line Available
- RailBlazer at RCDB

RailBlazer is a steel roller coaster at California's Great America in Santa Clara, California. Manufactured by Rocky Mountain Construction, the single-rail roller coaster opened in June 2018. RailBlazer is the ninth roller coaster at California's Great America, and features a 90-degree drop, three inversions, and an off-roading adventure theme.

RailBlazer was one of two prototype single-rail coasters to open in 2018, the other being the Wonder Woman Golden Lasso Coaster at sister park Six Flags Fiesta Texas, whose layout is a mirror image of RailBlazer's. On November 6, 2026, Six Flags announced that California’s Great America would be permanently closing on September 6, 2027.

== History ==
California's Great America announced RailBlazer on August 16, 2017, and accompanied it with an official groundbreaking ceremony. On the same day, the park released a simulated POV of the roller coaster. RailBlazer opened to passholders on June 9, 2018, and opened to the public 5 days later.

== Ride experience ==
The ride begins by exiting the station and ascending a 106 feet (32 m) tall chain lift. The train then banks left making a 180 degree turn and entering a 106 feet (32 m) tall 90 degree drop, diving into a tunnel and reaching a maximum speed of 52 miles per hour (84 km/h) before entering a dive loop. The train then rises up to the right into an off-axis airtime hill, followed by a right-facing upwards helix. After the helix, the train makes a left turn and quickly drops, entering a right-facing cutback and a corkscrew. Finally, riders go through an over-banked turn to the left before hitting the brake run.

== Characteristics ==
The roller coaster is themed to California State Route 1. It is meant to reflect an off-road adventure around the San Francisco Bay Area and California central coast. Multiple large rocks surround the ride, as well as a pool of water, which the queue interacts with. The trains are also built to resemble all-terrain vehicles (ATVs) with handlebars, grille, headlights and bumper.
