= Iron Rattler =

Steel roller coaster in San Antonio

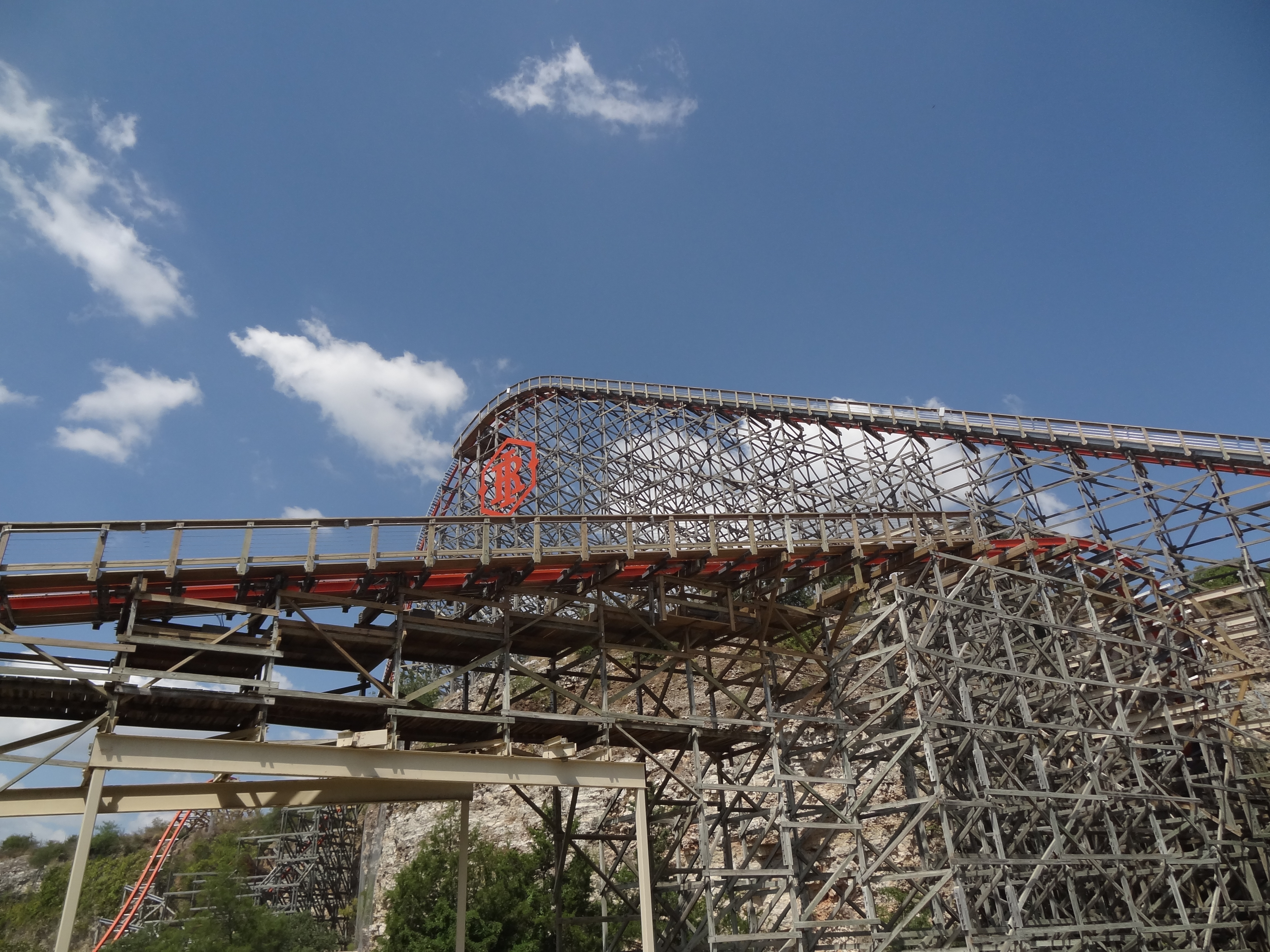

Six Flags Fiesta Texas
- Location: Six Flags Fiesta Texas
- Park section: Crackaxle Canyon
- Coordinates: 29.5986°N 98.6131°W
- Status: Operating
- Opening date: May 25, 2013
- Cost: US$10 million

General statistics
- Type: Steel
- Manufacturer: Rocky Mountain Construction
- Designer: Alan Schilke
- Model: I-Box
- Track layout: Terrain
- Lift/launch system: Chain lift hill
- Height: 179 ft (55 m)
- Drop: 171 ft (52 m)
- Length: 3,266 ft (995 m)
- Speed: 70 mph (110 km/h)
- Inversions: 1
- Max vertical angle: 81°
- Height restriction: 48 in (122 cm)
- Trains: 3 trains with 6 cars; riders arranged 2 across in 2 rows for a total of 24 riders per train
- Fast Lane available
- Iron Rattler at RCDB

Iron Rattler is a steel roller coaster located at Six Flags Fiesta Texas in San Antonio, Texas. The ride originally opened in 1992 as Rattler, the tallest wooden roller coaster in the world. It was converted to steel in 2013 by Rocky Mountain Construction (RMC), led by designer Alan Schilke, and reopened as Iron Rattler. RMC installed their patented I-Box track onto Rattler's existing wooden structure, increasing the drop height from 124 to 171 feet (38 to 52 m) and the maximum speed from 65 to 70 mph (105 to 113 km/h). A notable addition to its layout was a zero-g roll inversion, which was a first among hybrid coasters made of wood and steel.

The original wooden Rattler was constructed by the now-defunct Roller Coaster Corporation of America, featuring a height of 179 feet (55 m) and a drop of 166 feet (51 m). Rattler's first drop was heavily modified and reduced to 124 feet (38 m) by 1994. The transformation of the ride to Iron Rattler was well received, and it has frequently ranked in the top 50 among the world's best steel coasters in the annual Golden Ticket Awards publication from Amusement Today.

== History ==
=== Rattler (1992–2012) ===
Rattler in 1992, with its original 166 foot drop

The Rattler had been constructed by Roller Coaster Corporation of America. When the coaster debuted on March 14, 1992, it was the tallest and fastest wooden coaster in the world, with a height of 179 feet (55 m), a first drop of 166 feet (51 m), outdoing Mean Streak at Cedar Point by five feet. Designer John Pierce stated that the original plans kept changing as park co-developers Gaylord Entertainment Company insisted on having the tallest wooden coaster in the world. It held this title until 1994, when the bottom valley of the first drop was raised by 42 feet changing the overall drop from 166 to 124 feet (51 to 38 m).

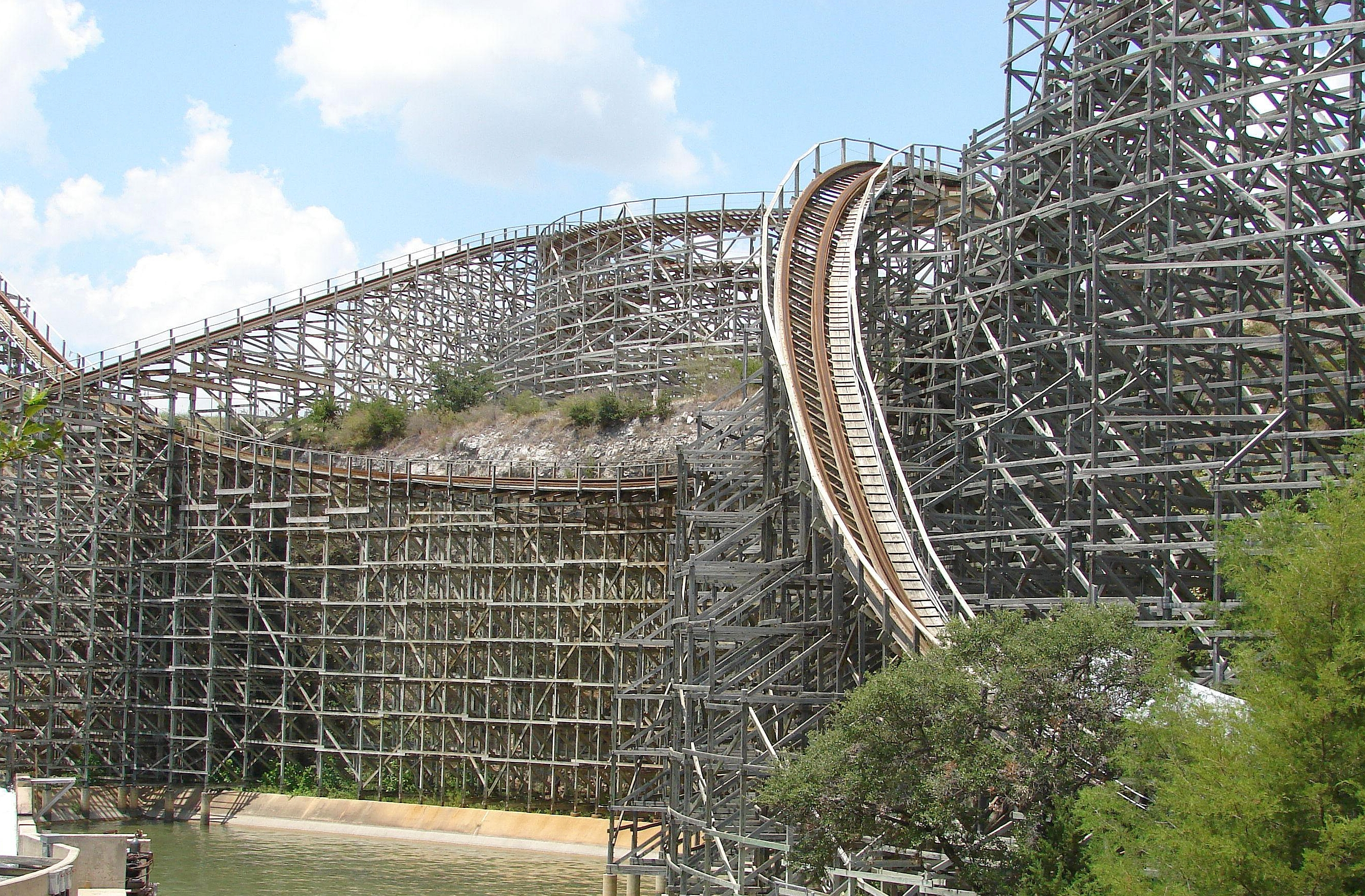
The Rattler in 2006, showing the raised first drop.

In late 2009, Six Flags Over Texas closed its Texas Giant wooden roller coaster for a $10 million renovation which took more than a year to complete. Idaho-based firm Rocky Mountain Construction (RMC) replaced the wooden track with a new steel I-Box track, retaining a wooden support structure. The refurbishment was ultimately a success with "resoundingly positive reviews from riders". The park's parent company, Six Flags, immediately began looking for other rides in its chain which would benefit from a similar overhaul.

=== Iron Rattler (2013–present) ===
At the IAAPA 2011 Trade Show, Alan Schilke of RMC revealed that the company had two projects that it would be working on for 2013 openings—one of which was an I-Box conversion of a wooden roller coaster. It was later revealed by the Spokane Journal of Business that The Rattler would be completely refurbished in 2013 with new track and trains in a manner similar to that used by the company on the New Texas Giant at Six Flags Over Texas in 2011. Although Six Flags had not publicly confirmed its plans, the park announced that Rattler would close on August 5, 2012. At the end of the operating day on August 5, 2012, park personnel and select enthusiasts took the final ride, after which, Rattler, as a wooden coaster, ceased operation.

Six Flags Fiesta Texas announced in August 2012 that the now-closed Rattler would be revamped into a steel-tracked coaster called Iron Rattler. The renovation would be performed by Rocky Mountain Construction and would feature the I-Box steel track on some of the original wooden coaster supports, Rattler-themed trains supplied by Gerstlauer, and a barrel roll. The new ride would open for the 2013 season.

The National Roller Coaster Museum and Archives announced on April 16, 2013, that the first rides of Iron Rattler, taking place on the evening of May 17, 2013, would be auctioned off with proceeds going to the museum. A soft-opening was held to the media on May 15, 2013. The grand opening of the Iron Rattler took place May 25, 2013. Following the deadly incident on the New Texas Giant on July 19, 2013, Six Flags Fiesta Texas temporarily closed Iron Rattler, pending investigation findings from its sister park, because the two rides share several similarities. In under a month, Iron Rattler reopened on August 14 with seat belts as another added restraint to the two trains.

== Characteristics ==
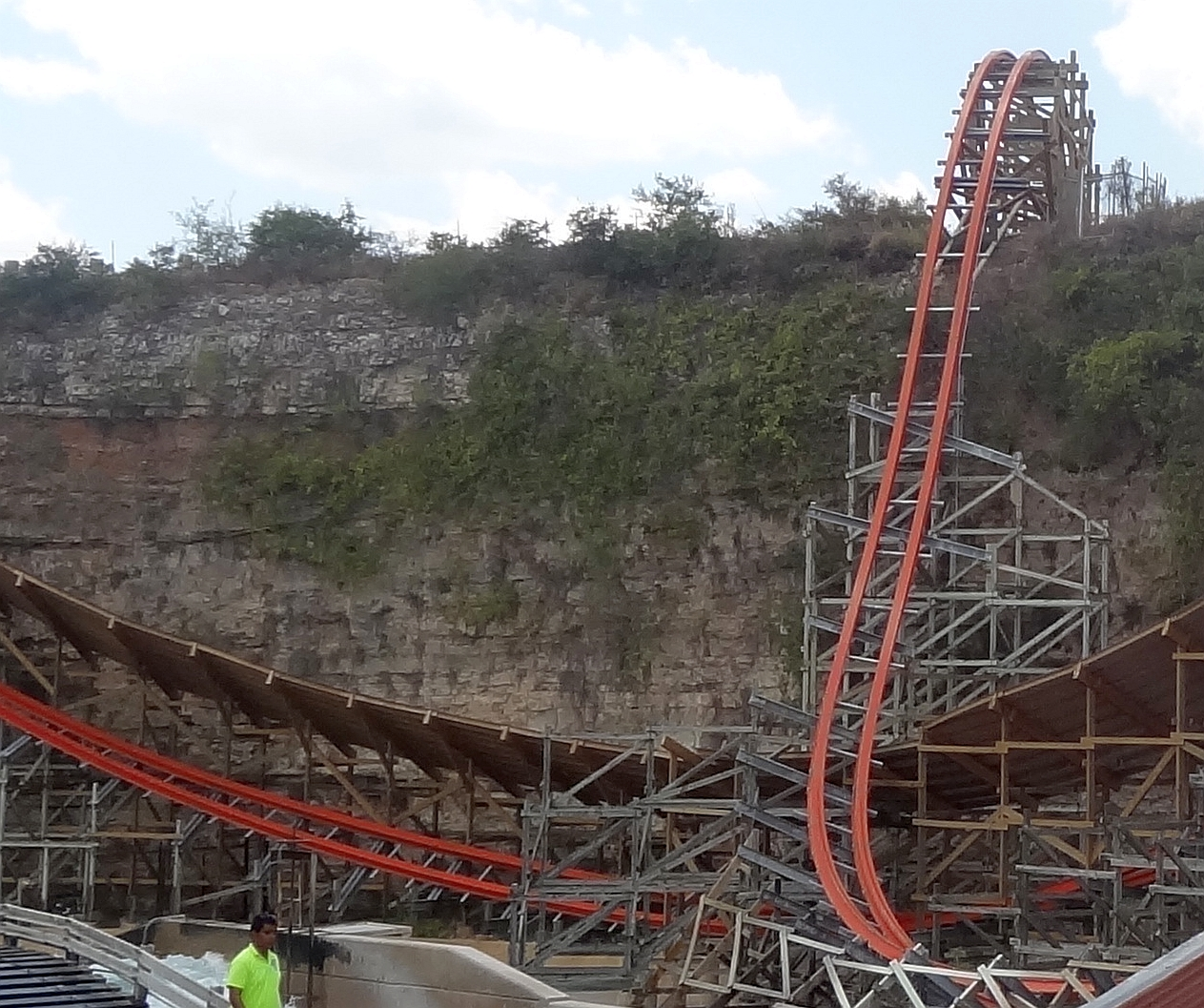
Iron Rattler uses overbanked turns and steel track

Iron Rattler is located in the Western-themed Crackaxle Canyon area of Fiesta Texas, sitting next to Road Runner Express and The Gully Washer. It is Rocky Mountain Construction's second installation of I-Box track, and the first to feature a barrel roll inversion. Iron Rattler operates with two rattlesnake-themed trains manufactured by Gerstlauer. Each train is made up of six cars which seat riders in two rows of two. Riders are restrained through the use of a lap bar and a seat belt.

The table below compares the original Rattler, with the updated Iron Rattler ride. The original ride by the Roller Coaster Corporation of America was approximately 1,800 feet (550 m) longer due to a 900° helix atop the quarry walls. The refurbished ride by Rocky Mountain Construction features a steeper and longer first drop, thus achieving a faster speed.

Statistic	The Rattler		Iron Rattler
Years	1992–1994	1994–2012	2013–present
Manufacturer	Roller Coaster Corporation of America		Rocky Mountain Construction
Designer	John Pierce		Alan Schilke
Track	Wood		Steel
Height	179 ft or 55 m		
Drop	166 ft or 51 m	124 ft or 38 m	171 ft or 52 m
Length	5,080 ft or 1,550 m	—N/a	3,266 ft or 995 m
Speed	63–73 mph or 101–117 km/h	65 mph or 105 km/h	70 mph or 110 km/h
Inversions	0		1
Max vertical angle	61.4°		81°
Trains	Morgan	PTC	Gerstlauer

== Ride experience ==
The ride begins by exiting out of the station and turning around under Road Runner Express. It ascends a 179-foot-tall (55 m) chain lift hill, before dropping 171 feet (52 m) at an angle of 81°. The track then ascends to the top of the quarry wall where it enters a 110° over-banked turn. A 95° over-banked turn leads to the left, back off the quarry wall. The ride then rises into the zero-g roll which sits atop the quarry wall. A camelback hill is followed by two more over-banked turns measuring 98° and 93°, respectively. The ride then drops back off the quarry wall and enters a tunnel near its base. The tunnel features fog and lighting effects. After exiting the tunnel, the train enters brake run and returns to the station.

== Reception ==
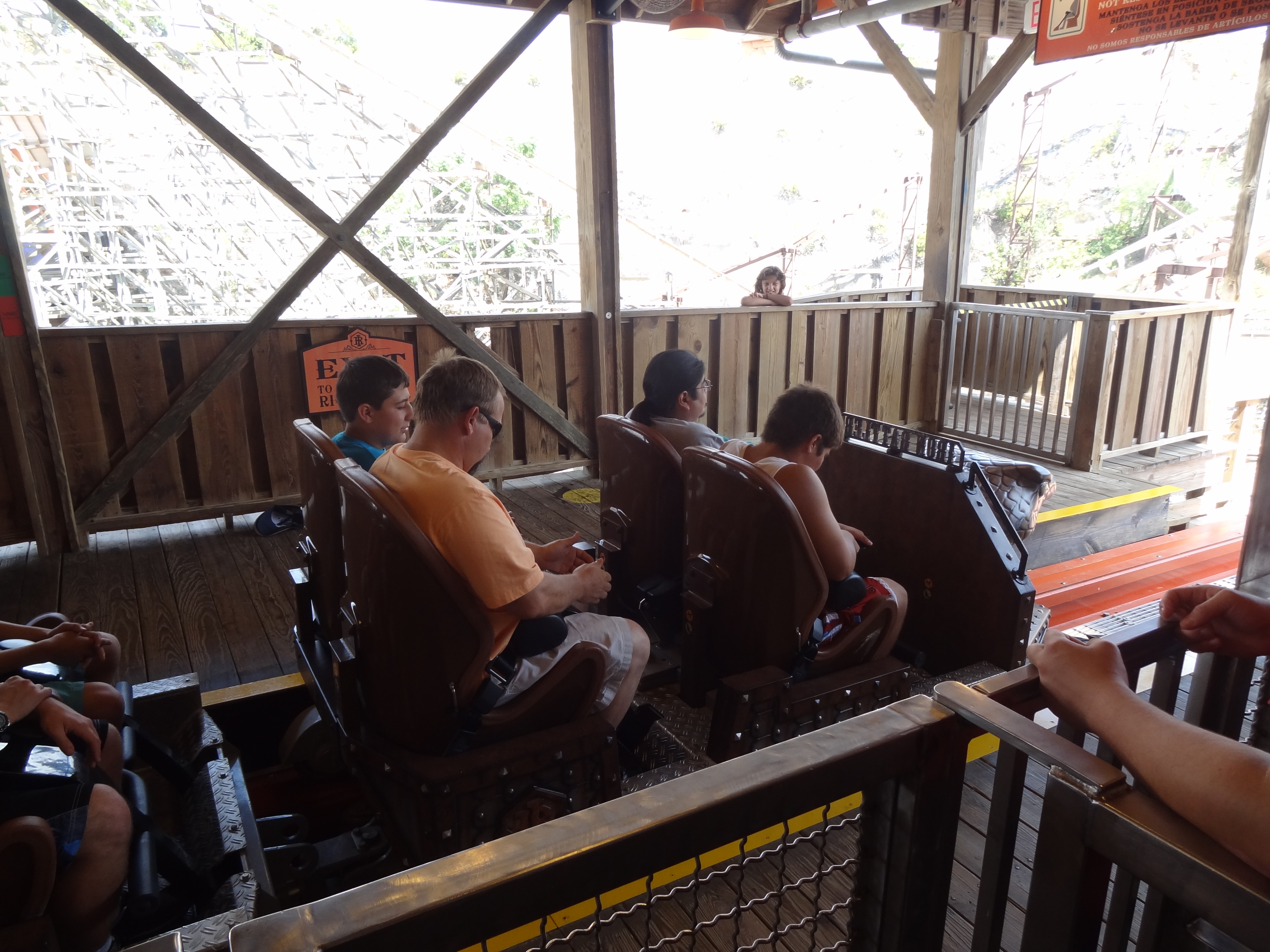
One of the themed trains departing the station

Iron Rattler has generally been well received. Keith Miller of Funworld Magazine described the ride as "wonderfully smooth" highlighting the slow cresting of the lift hill as an "enjoyable element". He concludes by stating "there's not one restful moment on this ride". Arthur Levine of About.com gave the ride 4.5 out of 5 stars. Levine applauded Six Flags for replacing a bad wooden roller coaster with "a wonderful, remarkably smooth, thoroughly fun and enjoyable ride". He also gives kudos to Rocky Mountain Construction who manufactured the I-Box track and redesigned the ride. Brenda Solis of KLQB described the ride as "the most intense, craziest roller coaster ever". She also compared the renovated ride to the original ride, stating "the old Rattler wasn't as scary or intense or fast as the new one".

Before Iron Rattler's debut year, Rattler was only ranked once in Amusement Today's Golden Ticket Awards Top 50 Wooden Coasters. After the renovation in 2013, Iron Rattler was ranked far higher by voters. The ride was voted the second-best new ride of 2013 with 19% of the votes. It also ranked at position 11 for the world's best steel roller coasters its debut year, and has remained in the top 50 ever since.

=== As Rattler ===
Golden Ticket Awards: Top wood Roller Coasters
Year									1998	1999
Ranking									–	–
Year	2000	2001	2002	2003	2004	2005	2006	2007	2008	2009
Ranking	–	–	–	–	–	–	–	–	–	–
Year	2010	2011	2012	2013	2014	2015	2016	2017	2018	2019
Ranking	–	47	–	–	–	–	–	–	–	–
Year	2020	2021	2022	2023	2024	2025	2026			
Ranking	N/A	–	–	–	–	–	–			

=== As Iron Rattler ===
Golden Ticket Awards: Top steel Roller Coasters
Year									1998	1999
Ranking									–	–
Year	2000	2001	2002	2003	2004	2005	2006	2007	2008	2009
Ranking	–	–	–	–	–	–	–	–	–	–
Year	2010	2011	2012	2013	2014	2015	2016	2017	2018	2019
Ranking	–	–	–	11	12	19	21	4	7	7
Year	2020	2021	2022	2023	2024	2025	2026			
Ranking	N/A	12	14	15 (tie)	20 (tie)	26	30			

Preceded by Mean Streak	World's Tallest Wooden Roller Coaster; 1992–June 2000	Succeeded by Son of Beast
Preceded by American Eagle	World's Fastest Wooden Roller Coaster; March 14, 1992 – 1994	Succeeded by American Eagle
