= Steel Vengeance =

Roller coaster at Cedar Point

- Previously known as Mean Streak (1991–2016)

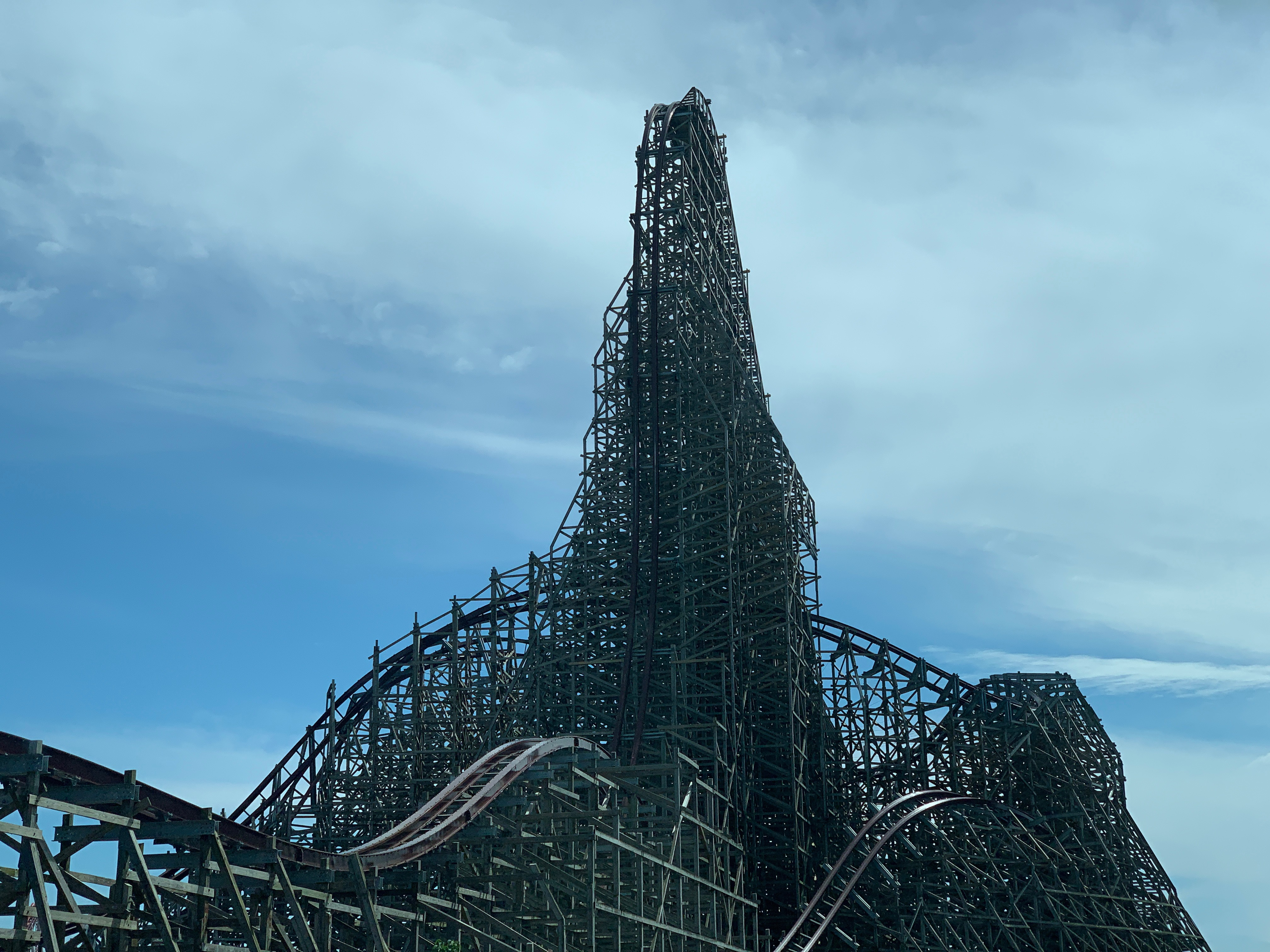

Cedar Point
- Location: Cedar Point
- Park section: Frontier Town
- Coordinates: 41°29′10.50″N 82°41′35.75″W
- Status: Operating
- Soft opening date: April 25, 2018
- Opening date: May 5, 2018
- Replaced: Mean Streak

General statistics
- Type: Steel
- Manufacturer: Rocky Mountain Construction
- Designer: Alan Schilke
- Model: I-Box Track
- Track layout: Twister
- Lift/launch system: Chain lift hill
- Height: 205 ft (62 m)
- Drop: 200 ft (61 m)
- Length: 5,740 ft (1,750 m)
- Speed: 74 mph (119 km/h)
- Inversions: 4
- Duration: 2:30
- Max vertical angle: 90°
- Capacity: 1200 riders per hour
- Height restriction: 52 in (132 cm)
- Trains: 3 trains with 6 cars; riders arranged 2 across in 2 rows for a total of 24 riders per train
- Website: Official website
- Fast Lane Plus only available
- Steel Vengeance at RCDB

Video

Steel Vengeance is a steel roller coaster located at Cedar Point in Sandusky, Ohio, United States. It was formerly known as Mean Streak, a wooden coaster constructed by Dinn Corporation that opened in 1991 as the tallest wooden coaster in the world. Rocky Mountain Construction (RMC) was hired to remake the ride into a hybrid coaster by combining their steel I-Box track with some of Mean Streak's wooden structure. It reopened as Steel Vengeance on May 5, 2018, setting 10 world records and becoming the tallest, fastest, and longest hybrid roller coaster.

Mean Streak operated for more than 25 years before its closure in 2016. At the time, the ride's future was uncertain. Cedar Point later dropped subtle hints of a possible track conversion in its advertising, which was officially confirmed the following year. Leading up to its opening, Steel Vengeance was marketed as the world's first hybrid hypercoaster, combining a steel track with wooden supports that exceeds a height of 200 feet (61 m). The coaster also features four inversions, a 90-degree drop, and a top speed of 74 mph (119 km/h). Since its debut, Steel Vengeance has consistently ranked as a top 5 steel coaster in the annual Golden Ticket Awards.

== History ==
=== Wooden roller coaster ===
Cedar Point revealed in 1990 that a new roller coaster would be built for the 1991 season. It was officially named Mean Streak on October 24, 1990. Construction began two months earlier in late August 1990 with land preparation. It continued through the rest of the year and spring of the following year. Mean Streak opened with the park's seasonal debut on May 11, 1991, in the Frontiertown section of the park behind one of Cedar Point & Lake Erie Railroad's stations. The ride's media day press conference was held on May 22, 1991.

Mean Streak was one of eleven roller coasters designed and manufactured by Ohio-based Dinn Corporation before the company went out of business in 1992. It was a twister coaster model designed by Curtis D. Summers, and the ride cost $7.5 million to construct. In September 2010, a small 5-foot (1.5 m) section caught fire, which was quickly contained by firefighters to a small portion of the ride.

=== Hybrid refurbishment ===
On August 1, 2016, Cedar Point announced that Mean Streak would offer its last rides to the public on September 16, 2016. Park officials, however, declined to confirm that the ride was being torn down. Following its closure, unconfirmed rumors emerged that the roller coaster was being refurbished by Rocky Mountain Construction (RMC), a manufacturing company well known for its restoration work on existing wooden roller coasters.

Cedar Point began teasing the public on the ride's future with the release of an 18-second teaser video entitled "They're Coming" on April 1, 2017. Cedar Point showed video shots briefly panning several elements of the rumored conversion. Another similar video showing snippets of the new ride was released a few months later in June. Three more videos were released over the summer of 2017, with catchphrases "They're rollin' in like thunder", "There's a score to settle", and "They stake their claim." On August 16, 2017, Cedar Point held an official announcement for Steel Vengeance. It was also announced that a virtual recreation of the ride would be made available in the PC video game, Planet Coaster.

Steel Vengeance opened to the public on May 5, 2018, but a minor collision between two trains forced Steel Vengeance to remain closed for most of its opening day. The coaster resumed operation with only a single train while RMC investigated the issue and made modifications. The ride was closed on certain weekday mornings to allow RMC to make repairs. The park temporarily removed the ride from its Fast Lane Plus lineup and considered timed boarding passes as a result of its limited capacity. Normal two-train operation resumed on June 1, 2018.

Following an incident on Twisted Timbers at Kings Dominion, where a phone hit a rider in the face during the ride, Cedar Point issued a temporary ban on cell phones when entering the ride's queue beginning in August 2018. The ban was lifted the following season after zipper pouches were installed on the trains to safely secure loose items. Metal detectors were installed in the queue, ensuring that all loose articles were placed in these pouches. The pouches were removed in 2020 following the COVID-19 pandemic, and the previous ban was reinstated.

== Characteristics ==
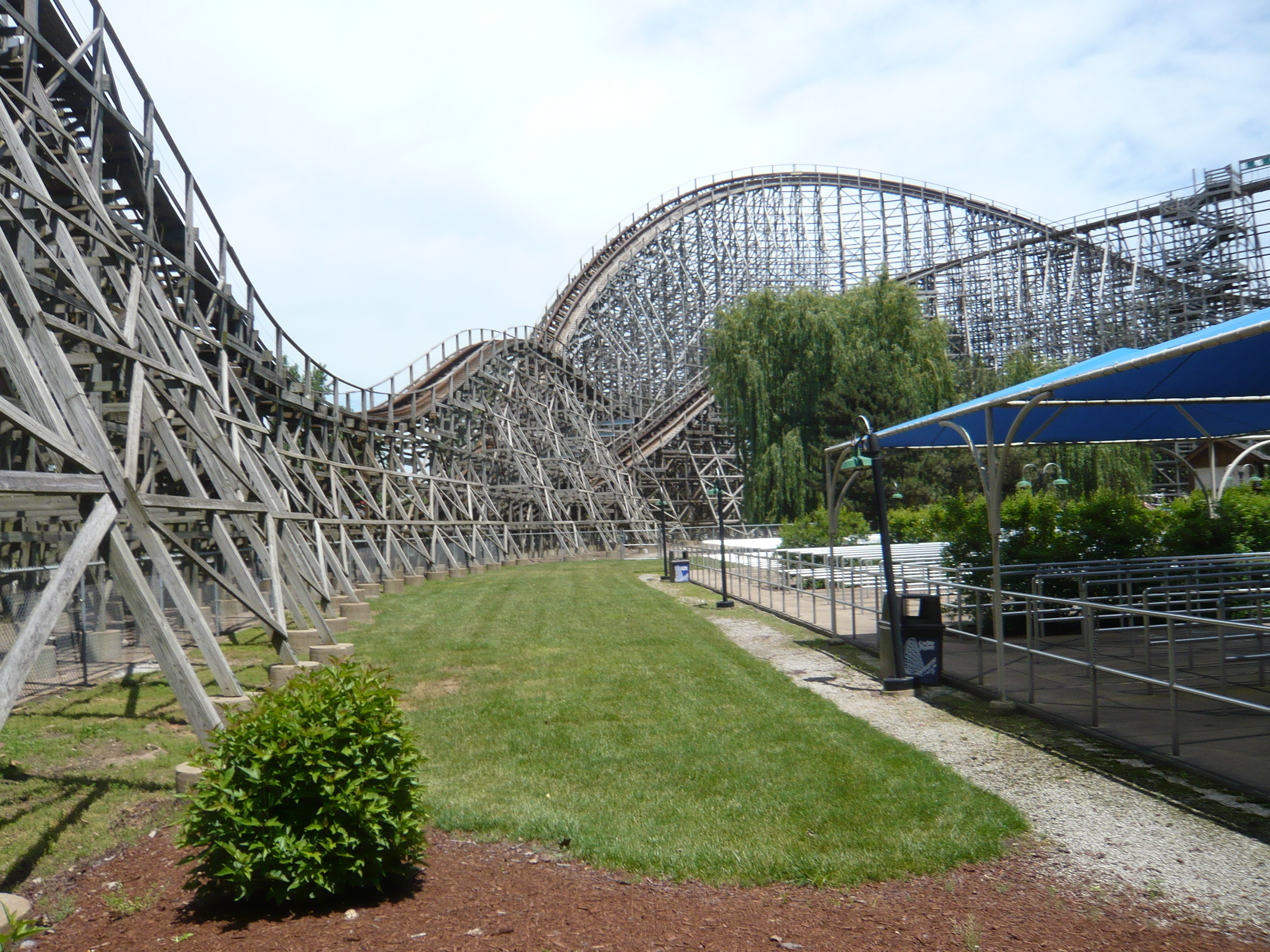
Mean Streak's first turnaround

Mean Streak's wooden track was about 5,427 feet (1,654 m) in length and the height of the lift hill was about 161 feet (49 m). It was constructed from more than 1.5 million board feet (3,500 m^{3}) of treated southern yellow pine. In 1994, a trim brake was installed on the first drop reducing its overall speed in an attempt to prevent abnormal track wear and increase ride comfort. Over the years, Mean Streak had been re-tracked several times. Some re-tracking was completed by Martin & Vleminckx. Prior to the 2012 operating season, many sections of track after the first drop were replaced. This was the most significant work done on the ride since it opened. Also, in 2012, a portion of the queue was removed to make room for a new building. The building is located in the infield of Mean Streak and is used for the HalloWeekends haunted house, Eden Musee. It is also used for storage during the off-season and summer.

Philadelphia Toboggan Coasters (PTC) manufactured three trains for Mean Streak. Each train had seven cars with riders arranged two across in two rows for a total of 28 riders per train. The minimum height required to ride was 48 inches (120 cm), and guests were secured by an individual ratcheting lap bar and seat belt. During the 2011–2012 off-season, all three trains were sent to PTC's headquarters for maintenance and refurbishment.

After the conversion to Steel Vengeance, the coaster's track length was extended to 5,740 feet (1,750 m) and the ride's peak height was increased to 205 feet (62 m). Its three new trains are each based on a character from the themed backstory of the ride: Jackson "Blackjack" Chamberlain, Chess "Wild One" Watkins, and Wyatt "Digger" Dempsey.

Statistic	Mean Streak	Steel Vengeance
Operating years	May 11, 1991 – September 16, 2016	May 5, 2018 – present
Manufacturer	Dinn Corporation	Rocky Mountain Construction
Designer	Curtis D. Summers	Alan Schilke
Track material	Wood	Steel
Height	161 ft or 49 m	205 ft or 62 m
Drop	155 ft or 47 m	200 ft or 61 m
Length	5,427 ft or 1,654 m	5,740 ft or 1,750 m
Speed	65 mph or 105 km/h	74 mph or 119 km/h
Duration	3:13	2:30
Inversions	0	4
Height requirement	48 inches	52 inches

== Ride experience ==
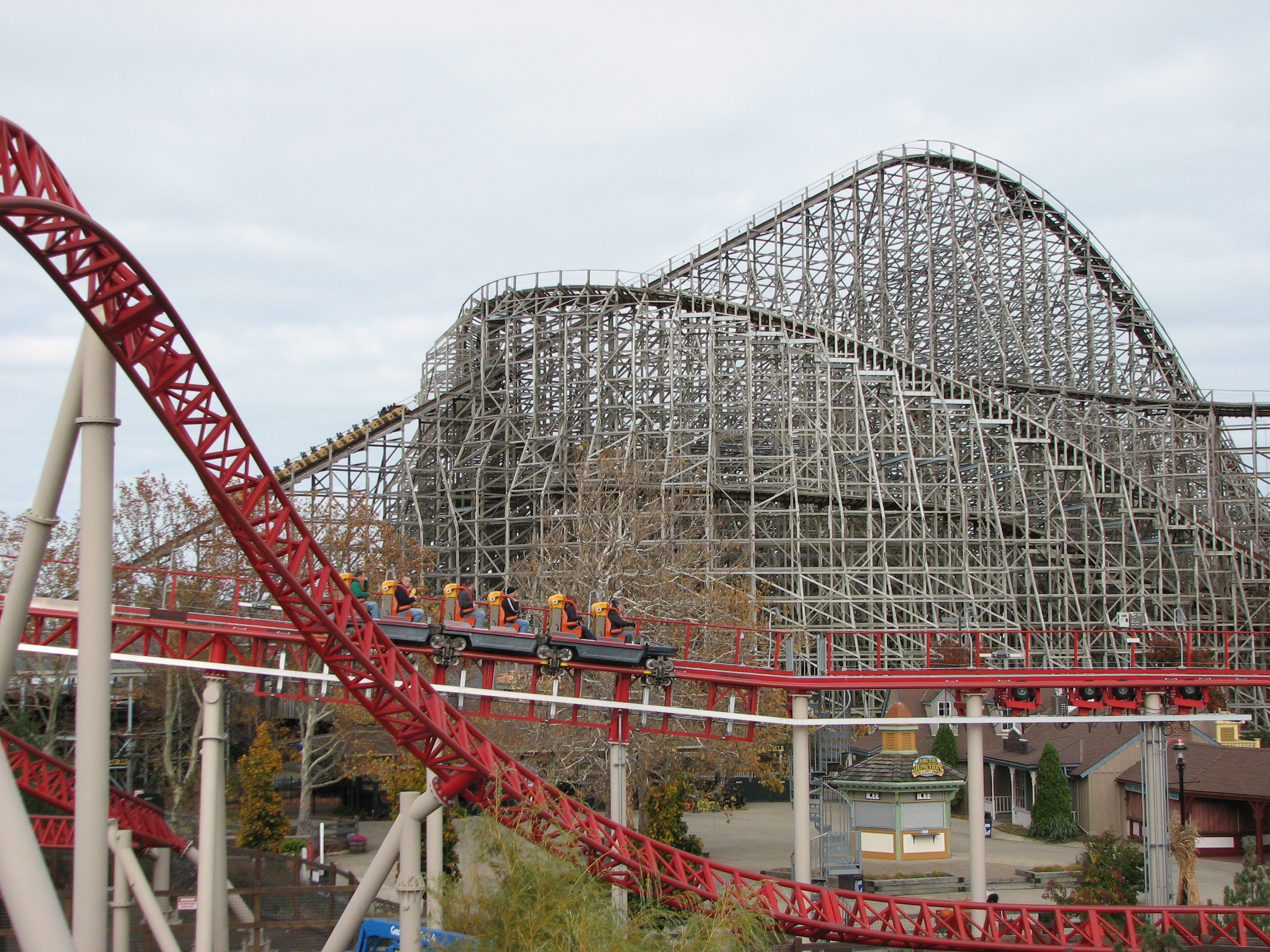
Mean Streak with Maverick in the foreground

=== Mean Streak ===
After leaving the station, the Mean Streak train passed through the storage tracks and made a 180-degree turn to the right, before ascending the 161-foot-tall (49 m) lift hill. After cresting the top of the hill, the train dropped 155 feet (47 m) at a 52-degree-angle, reaching a top speed of 65 miles per hour (105 km/h). While dropping, riders went through a set of trim brakes on the first drop. Riders then went through a 123-foot-tall (37 m) twisted turnaround followed by a small airtime hill, and then another twisted turnaround. The train maneuvered over the lift hill and dipped down to the right. After that, the train traveled through the ride's structure and down another hill, turning to the left into the mid-course brake run. The train then dipped down to the left into another airtime hill. Riders then went through several small airtime hills and turned through the ride's structure followed by the final brake run. One cycle of the ride lasted 3 minutes and 13 seconds, making it the former longest duration of any roller coaster at Cedar Point.

When Mean Streak opened in 1991, it was the tallest wooden roller coaster in the world and featured the longest drop. Upon closure in 2016, Mean Streak had the seventh tallest lift, the tenth fastest speed, the fourth longest track-length and the seventh longest drop.

=== Steel Vengeance ===
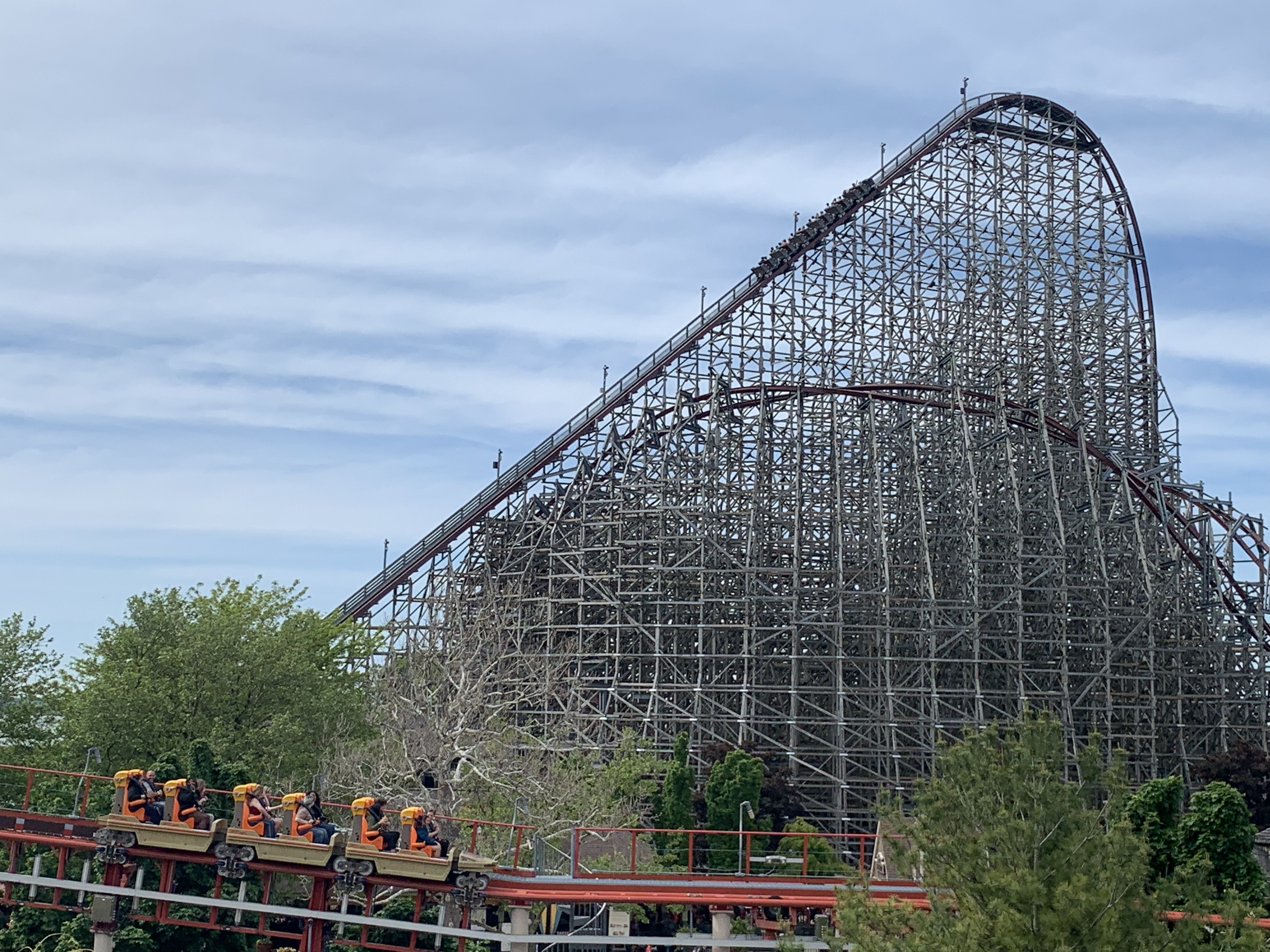
Steel Vengeance in the background

After leaving the station, the train makes a 180-degree right turn, passes over two small bunny hills, and begins its ascent up the 205-foot-tall (62 m) chain lift hill. After cresting the top of the lift hill, the train drops 200 feet (61 m) at a 90-degree angle, reaching its maximum speed of 74 mph (119 km/h). After this drop, the train traverses a speed hill followed by a climb into a larger airtime hill, which drops riders slightly to the right. Next, the train climbs up a left-turning, 116-foot (35 m) outward-banked hill, dips slightly right, and passes over a double up element, which leads to the first inversion, a zero-g roll variant.

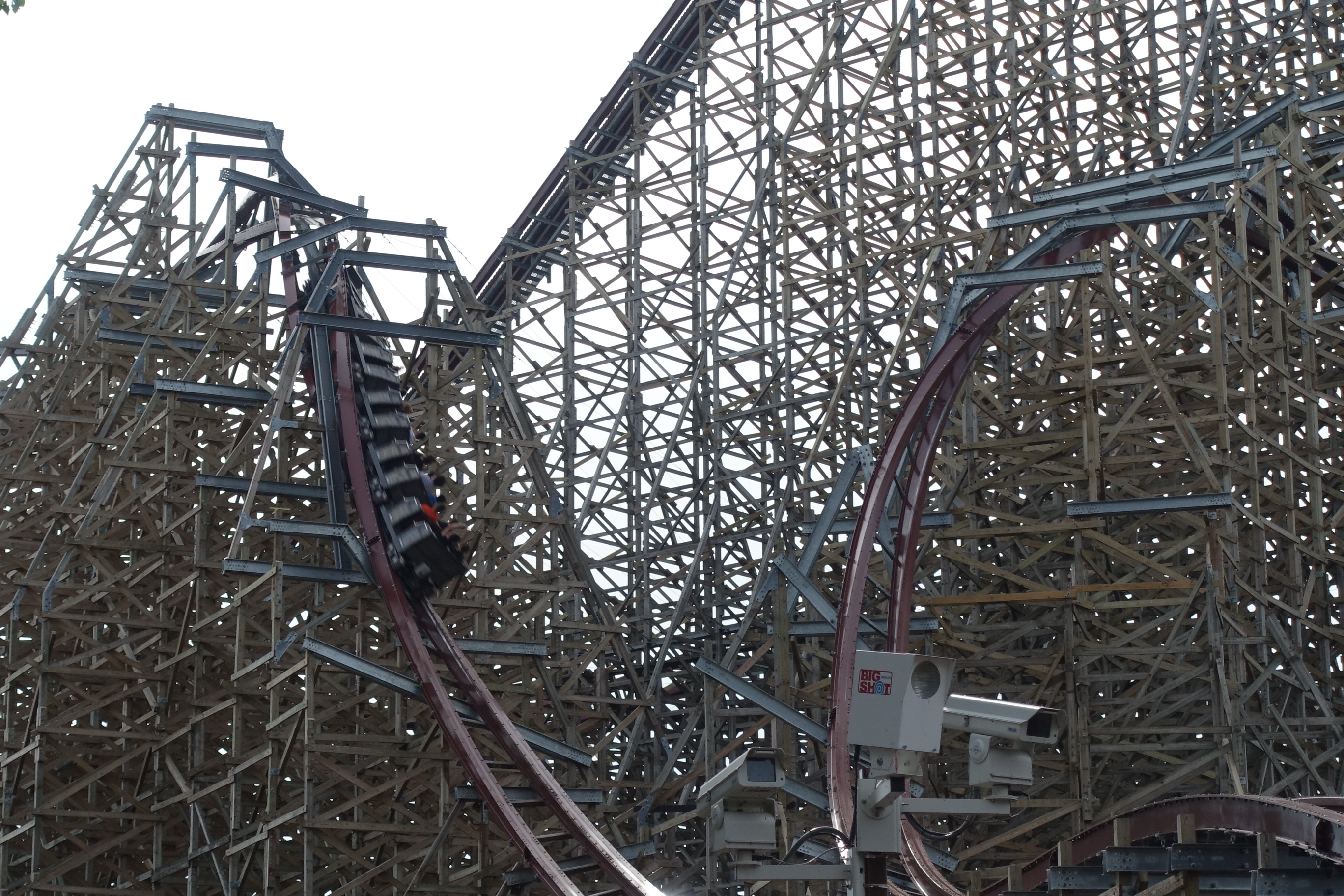
A train entering the first inversion

The train dips right, passing underneath the lift hill into an overbanked turn to the right that incorporates an airtime hill, known as a wave turn, which leads into the second inversion, a zero-g stall. The train passes through the lift hill structure for a second time and dips down, entering another double up element into the mid-course brake run. This is followed by a sharp left turn into a short, steep drop that dips slightly left. The train then navigates an upward turn to the left, traverses another airtime hill, and rises once more into a slight left turn.

Next, the train enters a small drop into a high-speed overbanked left turn, which leads into the third inversion, another zero-g roll. It exits into a double-up and another high-speed overbanked left turn, followed by one last zero-g roll as the fourth inversion. There is a final overbanked left turn followed by a series of 6 small airtime hills for the finale, and then the train reaches the final brake run and returns to the loading station. One cycle of the ride lasts about 2 minutes and 30 seconds.

== World records ==
Steel Vengeance broke 10 world records when it opened, some of which have since been broken.

Past records:

- World's tallest hybrid roller coaster at 205 feet (62 m)
- World's fastest hybrid roller coaster at 74 miles per hour (119 km/h)
- World's steepest drop on a hybrid roller coaster at 90 degrees
- World's longest drop on a hybrid roller coaster at 200 feet (61 m)
- Most inversions on a hybrid roller coaster at 4

Current records:

- World's longest hybrid roller coaster at 5,740 feet (1,750 m)
- Fastest airtime hill on a hybrid roller coaster at 74 miles per hour (119 km/h)
- Most airtime on a hybrid roller coaster at 27.2 seconds
- Most airtime on any roller coaster at 27.2 seconds
- World's first "hyper-hybrid" roller coaster

== Incidents ==
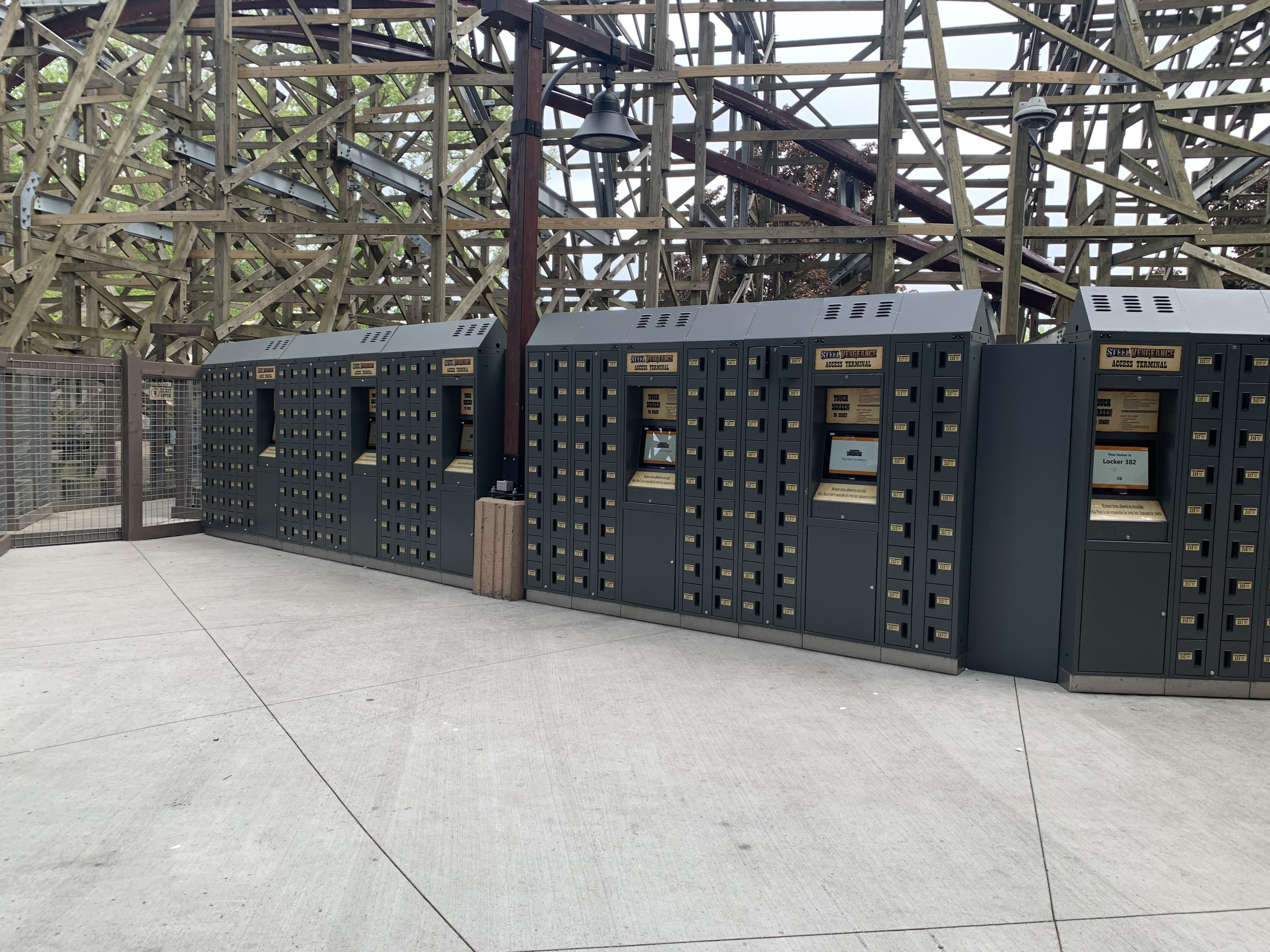
Free lockers for personal belongings near entrance

- During opening day on May 5, 2018, Steel Vengeance was temporarily closed following a minor collision between two trains. As a train was reentering the station, it "lightly bumped" another parked train. Four riders were treated for minor injuries and later returned to the park.
- On July 21, 2018, a 17-year-old boy was arrested and charged with a misdemeanor for throwing a hot sauce packet at a moving train. Seven people were treated by the park's EMS after the packet exploded and hit them in the face and eyes.
- On August 10, 2018, a tire from the drive system located near the brake run became detached and landed near the queue. The ride was then evacuated and reopened later that same evening.

== Reception ==
Writers from The Pantagraph stated that Mean Streak was "the best-kept-secret at Cedar Point," as it was located at the very back of the park. The ride was also featured on the Today show in 1992 in connection with the 100th anniversary of roller coasters.

Mean Streak had been ranked as one of the most popular wooden roller coasters in the world. Amusement Today magazine's Golden Ticket Awards ranked Mean Streak as one of the world's 50 best wooden roller coasters nine times from 1998 to 2012. (Note: See:)

Steel Vengeance received the Golden Ticket Award for Best New Ride in 2018. It has also been ranked among the top 50 steel coasters every year since its reopening, except in 2020, when the Golden Ticket Awards were not held. (Note: See:)

Golden Ticket Awards: Top wood Roller Coasters
Year									1998	1999
Ranking									21	18
Year	2000	2001	2002	2003	2004	2005	2006	2007	2008	2009
Ranking	16	34 (tie)	40	49	–	33 (tie)	–	39	–	–
Year	2010	2011	2012	2013	2014	2015	2016	2017	2018	2019
Ranking	–	–	45	–	–	–	–	–	–	–
Year	2020	2021	2022	2023	2024	2025	2026			
Ranking	N/A	–	–	–	–	–	–			

Golden Ticket Awards: Top steel Roller Coasters
Year									1998	1999
Ranking									–	–
Year	2000	2001	2002	2003	2004	2005	2006	2007	2008	2009
Ranking	–	–	–	–	–	–	–	–	–	–
Year	2010	2011	2012	2013	2014	2015	2016	2017	2018	2019
Ranking	–	–	–	–	–	–	–	–	3	3
Year	2020	2021	2022	2023	2024	2025	2026			
Ranking	N/A	3	2	4	3	3	3			

== See also ==
- Twisted Timbers – a roller coaster at sister park Kings Dominion that underwent a similar conversion.

Preceded by Texas Giant	World's Tallest Wooden Roller Coaster; May 1991 – March 1992	Succeeded by Rattler
