= The Gully Washer =

Intamin river rapids ride

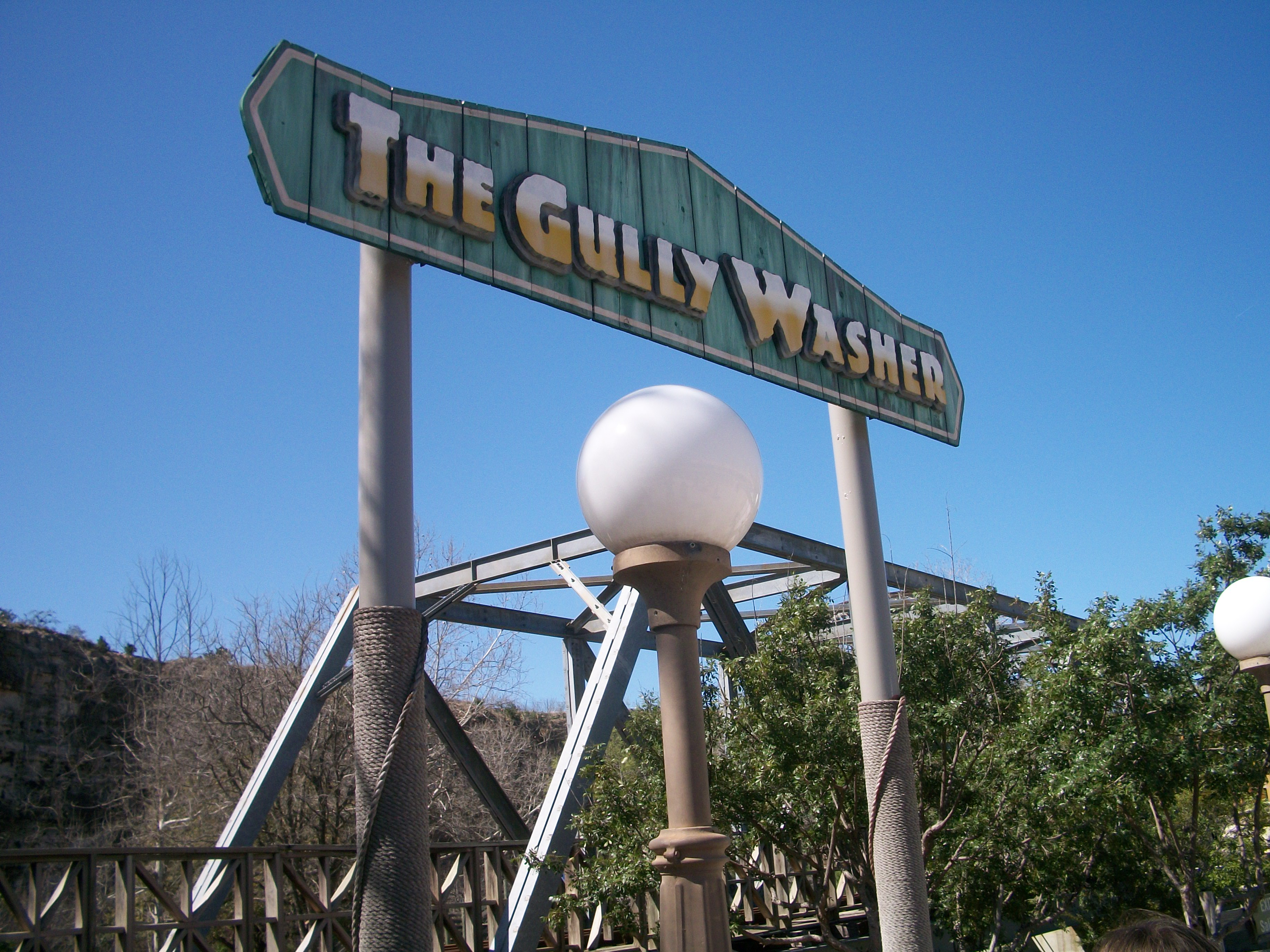
- Entrance of The Gully Washer

Six Flags Fiesta Texas
- Area: Crackaxle Canyon
- Status: Operating
- Opening date: 1992

General statistics
- Type: River rapids ride
- Manufacturer: Intamin
- Lift system: 1 lift hill
- Duration: 4:00
- Restraint style: Seat Belts
- Height restriction: 36 in (91 cm)
- Fast Lane available

The Gully Washer is an Intamin river rapids ride located in the Crackaxle Canyon section at Six Flags Fiesta Texas in San Antonio, Texas, since 1992. The ride is themed to a raging river in the town of Crackaxle Canyon.

== Ride experience ==
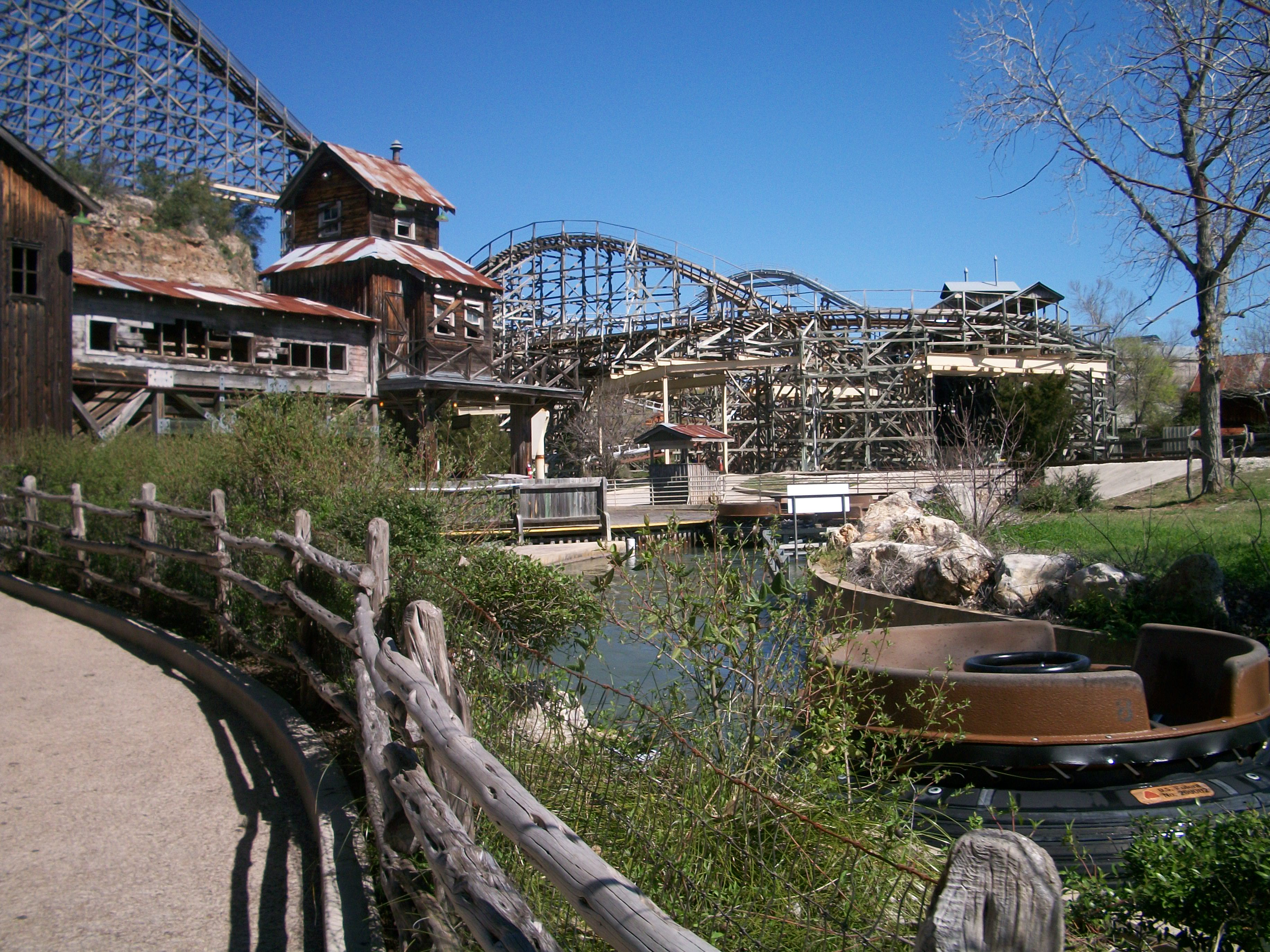
The Gully Washer's station.

=== Queue ===
Guests first pass underneath the entrance sign and go right. They then climb down the staircase and go left under the Fiesta Texas Railroad tracks. From there, guests navigate through winding pathways and the viewing area. After passing through the viewing area, guests go across the bridge over the exit path. After this, guests walk through the first passage. Some scenery can be spotted, such as a tower, boulders and a shed. Guests then go across another bridge above the water. Following this, there is an extended queue area on the left side with more passages and winding curves. After a few more pathways, guests reach the station.

=== Ride ===
The Gully Washer has one lift hill and several ways to get guests soaked. Once riders gets to the station and get on one of the several rafts, the raft goes through the man made river in Crackaxle Canyon with several dips and turns. The raft will then do a U-turn in front of Bubba's restaurant and go back and follow along the quarry wall where it then goes under the water fall. After the waterfall the raft will then follow the river under Iron Rattler until it reaches the lift hill that takes the guests back to the station to let them to get off.

== Additional information ==
During Six Flag's Fright Fest, the water on the ride is dyed with the color red to represent blood for Halloween. In 2010, Six Flags added additional ways to get the riders wet during the ride.
