= Tennessee Tornado =

Steel roller coaster at Dollywood

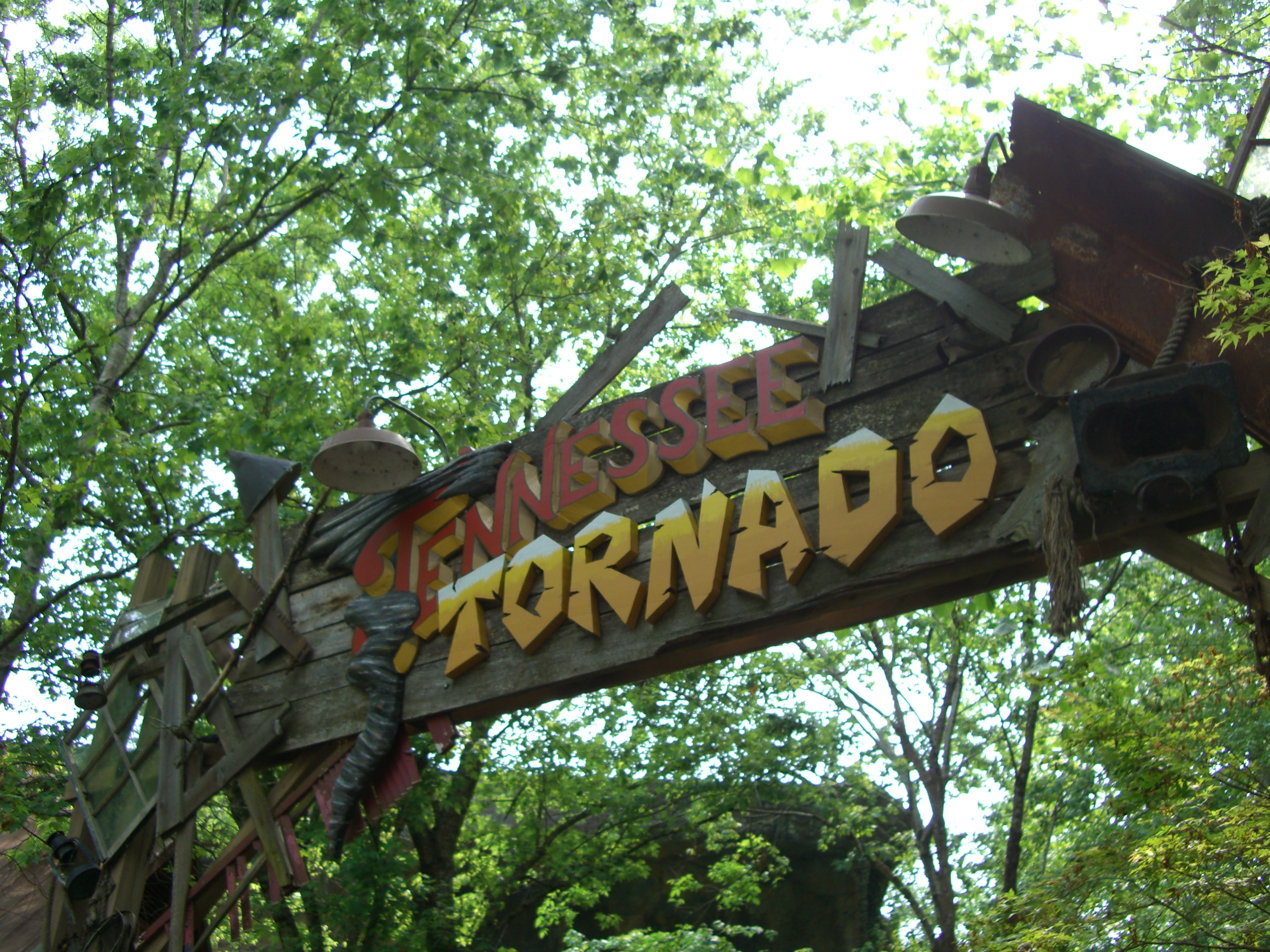
- Tennessee Tornado's logo

Dollywood
- Location: Dollywood
- Park section: Craftsmen's Valley
- Coordinates: 35.793°N 83.5279°W
- Status: Operating
- Opening date: April 17, 1999; 27 years ago
- Cost: $8,000,000 USD ($15.5 million in 2025 dollars)
- Replaced: Thunder Express

General statistics
- Type: Steel
- Manufacturer: Arrow Dynamics
- Designer: Alan Schilke
- Model: Custom Looping Coaster
- Track layout: Terrain
- Lift/launch system: Chain lift hill
- Height: 163 ft (50 m)
- Drop: 128 ft (39 m)
- Length: 2,682 ft (817 m)
- Speed: 63 mph (101 km/h)
- Inversions: 3
- Duration: 1:48
- Capacity: 1,360 riders per hour
- G-force: 4.0
- Height restriction: 48 in (122 cm)
- Trains: 2 trains with 7 cars. Riders are arranged 2 across in 2 rows for a total of 28 riders per train.
- Must transfer from wheelchair
- Tennessee Tornado at RCDB

Tennessee Tornado is a roller coaster at Dollywood amusement park in Pigeon Forge, Tennessee, United States. It debuted April 17, 1999, and was Dollywood's first major coaster expansion as well as one of Arrow Dynamics' last major coasters. The ride opened in a valley location previously occupied by Thunder Express, an Arrow Dynamics Mine Train roller coaster relocated from Six Flags St. Louis in 1989 and opened in 2002 at Magic Springs.

The theming behind the coaster is set In the late 1800's when a strong tornado sweeps through Tennessee, pulling all of the minecarts out of a local mineshaft and throwing them about.

== History ==
On June 30, 1998, Dollywood announced that Tennessee Tornado would be coming to the park. Arrow Dynamics was hired to build a newer Custom Looping Coaster. Vertical construction of the ride started in the fall of 1998 and was completed in early 1999. The Thunder Express station was also reused for the new ride. Tennessee Tornado would open to the public on April 17, 1999.

== Ride experience ==
=== Layout ===
The train departs the station and makes a small dip and into a left hand turn into a covered building resembling a mineshaft. The train makes another dip into a right hand turn and begins to ascend the 163-foot-tall (50 m) chain lift hill. The train make a descending banked right turn, before descending to its longest drop of 128-foot-tall (39 m) and through a tunnel. The train then begins to a climb through a 110-foot-tall (34 m) loop, nicknamed the "Spiro Loop". The train makes an overbanked right turn and through a vertical loop followed by a sidewinder, the train travels through a double-up and into the final brake run. The train then makes a slight left turn leading back into the station.

=== Track ===
Tennessee Tornado has several unique features not found on other Arrow Dynamics looping coasters. At the time of the coaster's construction it had been several years since the company had last built a sit-down looping coaster, so the designers created new elements and track designs for the ride, including two overbanked curves and a 110-foot-tall (34 m) "Spiro loop", the largest inversion on any Arrow Dynamics coaster.

Tennessee Tornado is also unique in that it uses a tubular steel beam support structure similar to that of Bolliger & Mabillard roller coasters, rather than the more typical Arrow Dynamics scaffolding-style supports found on rides such as Carolina Cyclone at Carowinds and the defunct Vortex at Kings Island. This kind of support structure was first used on the defunct Drachen Fire at Busch Gardens Williamsburg, which opened in 1992 and closed in 1998.

== Gallery ==
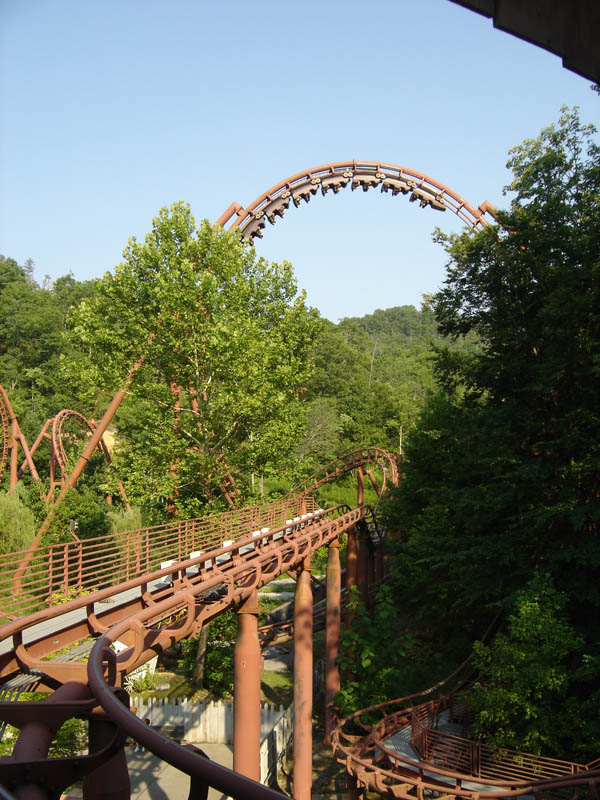
Tennessee Tornado's "Spiro Loop" element, and final brake run

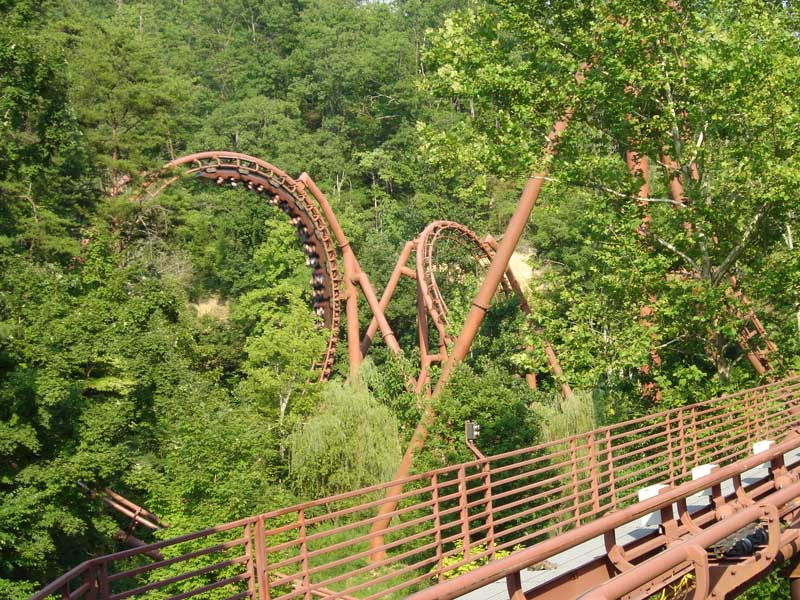
Tennessee Torando's vertical loop and sidewinder
