= Twisted Timbers =

Steel roller coaster at Kings Dominion

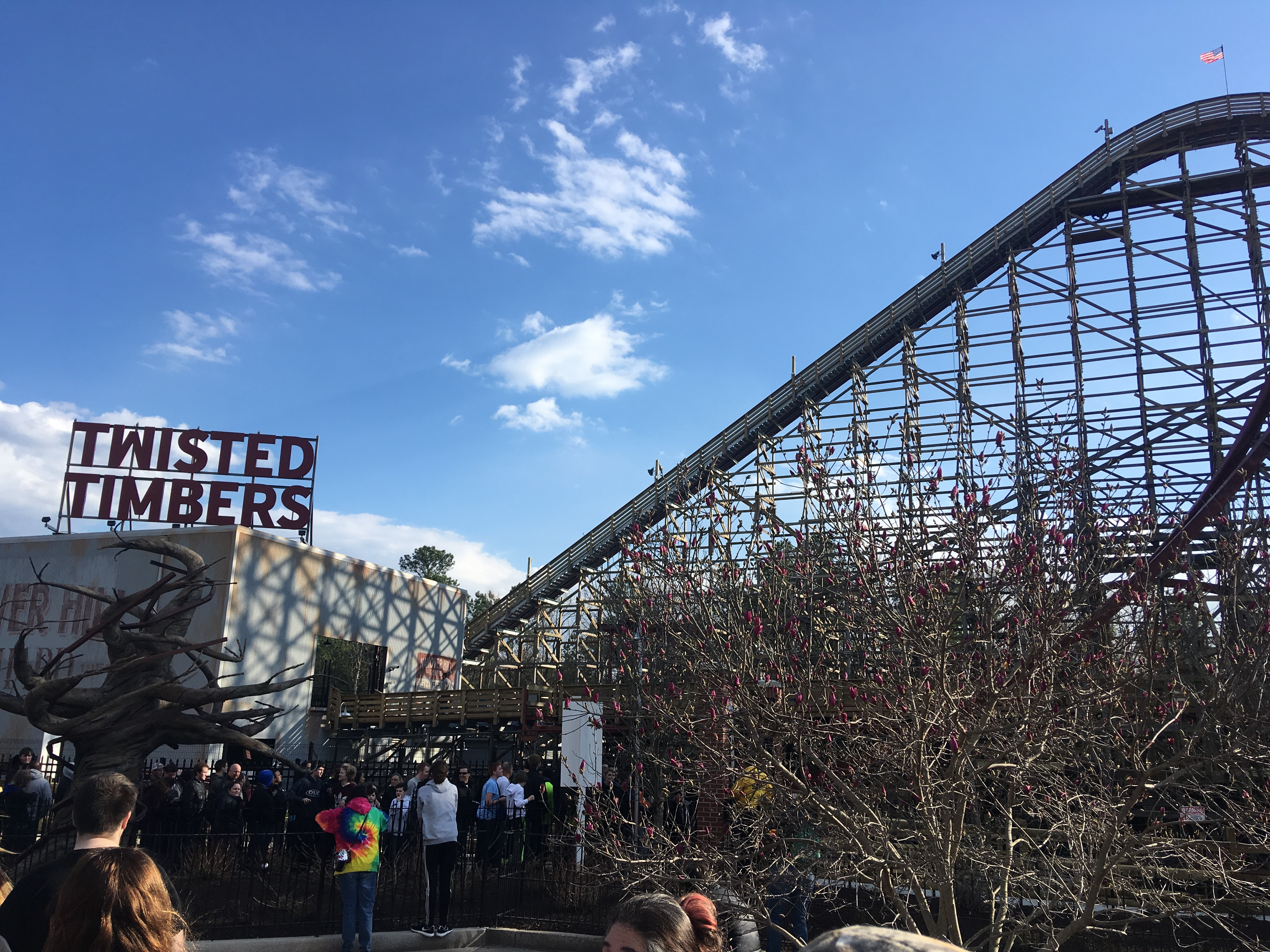
- Twisted Timbers' lift hill and sign

Kings Dominion
- Location: Kings Dominion
- Park section: Candy Apple Grove
- Coordinates: 37°50′10.81″N 77°26′44.29″W
- Status: Operating
- Soft opening date: March 23, 2018
- Opening date: March 24, 2018
- Replaced: Hurler

General statistics
- Type: Steel
- Manufacturer: Rocky Mountain Construction
- Designer: Alan Schilke
- Model: I-Box
- Track layout: Triple out and back
- Lift/launch system: Chain lift hill
- Height: 111 ft (34 m)
- Drop: 109 ft (33 m)
- Length: 3,351 ft (1,021 m)
- Speed: 54 mph (87 km/h)
- Inversions: 3
- Height restriction: 48 in (122 cm)
- Trains: 2 trains with 6 cars; riders arranged 2 across in 2 rows for a total of 24 riders per train
- Website: Official website
- Fast Lane available
- Wheelchair accessible
- Must transfer from wheelchair
- Twisted Timbers at RCDB

Twisted Timbers is a hybrid roller coaster built by American manufacturer Rocky Mountain Construction and located at Kings Dominion in Doswell, Virginia. It originally opened as a wooden coaster named Hurler in 1994, designed and manufactured by International Coasters, Inc, as an exact clone of Hurler at Carowinds. The ride closed for "extensive maintenance" in 2015 according to the park, which later teased in 2016 that Hurler was being replaced.

The park contracted Rocky Mountain Construction (also known as "RMC") to revamp the aging roller coaster, and in the process, the coaster was redesigned, and the wooden track was replaced with steel. The updated track utilizes the company's I-Box track technology, which allows for more aggressive elements and inversions. The roller coaster reemerged as "Twisted Timbers" on March 24, 2018, featuring three overbanked turns, three inversions, and twenty airtime moments. Twisted Timbers is also faster than its predecessor, reaching a maximum speed of 54 mph (87 km/h). It ranked third among new rides in 2018 in the annual Golden Ticket Awards from Amusement Today.

== History ==
In 2016, Kings Dominion began to tease that Hurler, a roller coaster which had been closed since 2015, would reopen in 2018. The park also alluded to an upcoming renovation and conversion by Rocky Mountain Construction with the message, "There's really more coming." On August 16, 2017, Kings Dominion confirmed Hurler would reemerge as Twisted Timbers, and open to the public in 2018. The official announcement came in a press release that featured promotional artwork for the ride, as well as ride specifications. Just like Wind Chaser at Kentucky Kingdom, the ride would feature a barrel roll drop.

The park scheduled a soft opening on March 22, 2018, for media and members of the enthusiast group American Coaster Enthusiasts, with a second soft opening scheduled the following day for season ticket holders. However, due to inclement weather on March 21, both planned soft openings were held on March 23. The grand opening to the public was held on March 24, 2018.

=== Construction ===
When Hurler closed in fall 2015, no signs of renovation were detected. However, on March 25, 2017, RMC I-Box track was spotted in a storage yard at the park. Amateur drone footage taken four days later revealed that track removal on the old structure had begun. On May 20, new wood and steel supports appeared on the old structure for the first time. Exactly one month later, the park tweeted the first in a series of teasers which set the ride's announcement date for August 16. On August 8, slightly over a week before the formal announcement and three days before ride details leaked onto social media, the ride's lift hill, its highest point, was topped off.

After a winter hiatus, the final track pieces and two custom trains were installed on February 17, 2018, with the signatures of the park's full-time employees placed on the final piece as an "Easter egg". Kings Dominion tested the completed attraction for the first time on February 21. On March 20, four days before the ride's scheduled grand opening, its two trains, one with a blue paint scheme and the other green, tested together.

== Theme ==
The ride takes place in the fictional Hanover Hill Orchard, a rustic apple orchard named after Hanover County, Virginia, where Kings Dominion is located. Signage throughout the queue provides the ride's backstory, stating that in 1950, a mysterious force destroyed the orchard and froze it in time. In the present day, a local businessman has ignored legends surrounding the orchard and reopened it to the public just as it appeared in the 1950s.

Guests are supposed to be touring the abandoned orchard, with the queue line weaving past mangled trees, flipped farm vehicles, and other evidence of the orchard's destruction. The station is themed to a partially destroyed apple shipping warehouse, and the trains resemble weathered 1937 Ford pickup trucks.

Along with the ride's opening in 2018, the surrounding area of the park's Candy Apple Grove section was rethemed to continue the 1950s orchard theme.

== Characteristics ==
Twisted Timbers, previously known as Hurler, is located in the Candy Apple Grove section of Kings Dominion. The roller coaster takes riders to a height of 111 feet (34 m) before entering a barrel roll inversion and dropping them 109 feet (33 m) down the first hill. It reaches a maximum speed of 54 mph (87 km/h), features twenty airtime moments with three overbanked turns, and takes riders through two additional inversions including a cutback and zero-g roll.

Statistic	Hurler	Twisted Timbers
Years	1994–2015	2018–present
Manufacturer	International Coasters, Inc.	Rocky Mountain Construction
Track	Wood	Steel
Height	83 ft (25 m)	111 ft (34 m)
Length	3,157 ft (962 m)	3,351 ft (1,021 m)
Speed	50 mph (80 km/h)	54 mph (87 km/h)
Inversions	0	3

== Reception ==
In its debut year, Twisted Timbers placed third in the category of "Best New Ride for 2018" in the annual Golden Ticket Awards publication from Amusement Today, a trade newspaper that focuses on the amusement park industry. Twisted Timbers also ranked 38th on the same publication's list of top 50 steel roller coasters, with Amusement Today complimenting the characteristics of the newly-revamped coaster, saying it "features dramatic maneuvers, an abundance of airtime, inversions and a remarkable smoothness compared to its former life".

Golden Ticket Awards: Top steel Roller Coasters
Year									1998	1999
Ranking									–	–
Year	2000	2001	2002	2003	2004	2005	2006	2007	2008	2009
Ranking	–	–	–	–	–	–	–	–	–	–
Year	2010	2011	2012	2013	2014	2015	2016	2017	2018	2019
Ranking	–	–	–	–	–	–	–	–	38	37
Year	2020	2021	2022	2023	2024	2025	2026			
Ranking	N/A	39	40	–	–	–	–			

== Incidents ==
In June 2018, a woman was hit in the forehead by a mobile phone while riding Twisted Timbers. She was later taken to the hospital and received three stitches.

== See also ==
- Hurler – a roller coaster at sister park Carowinds that shared the same former name
- Steel Vengeance – a roller coaster at Cedar Point that underwent a similar conversion
