= Road Runner Express (Six Flags Fiesta Texas) =

Steel roller coaster

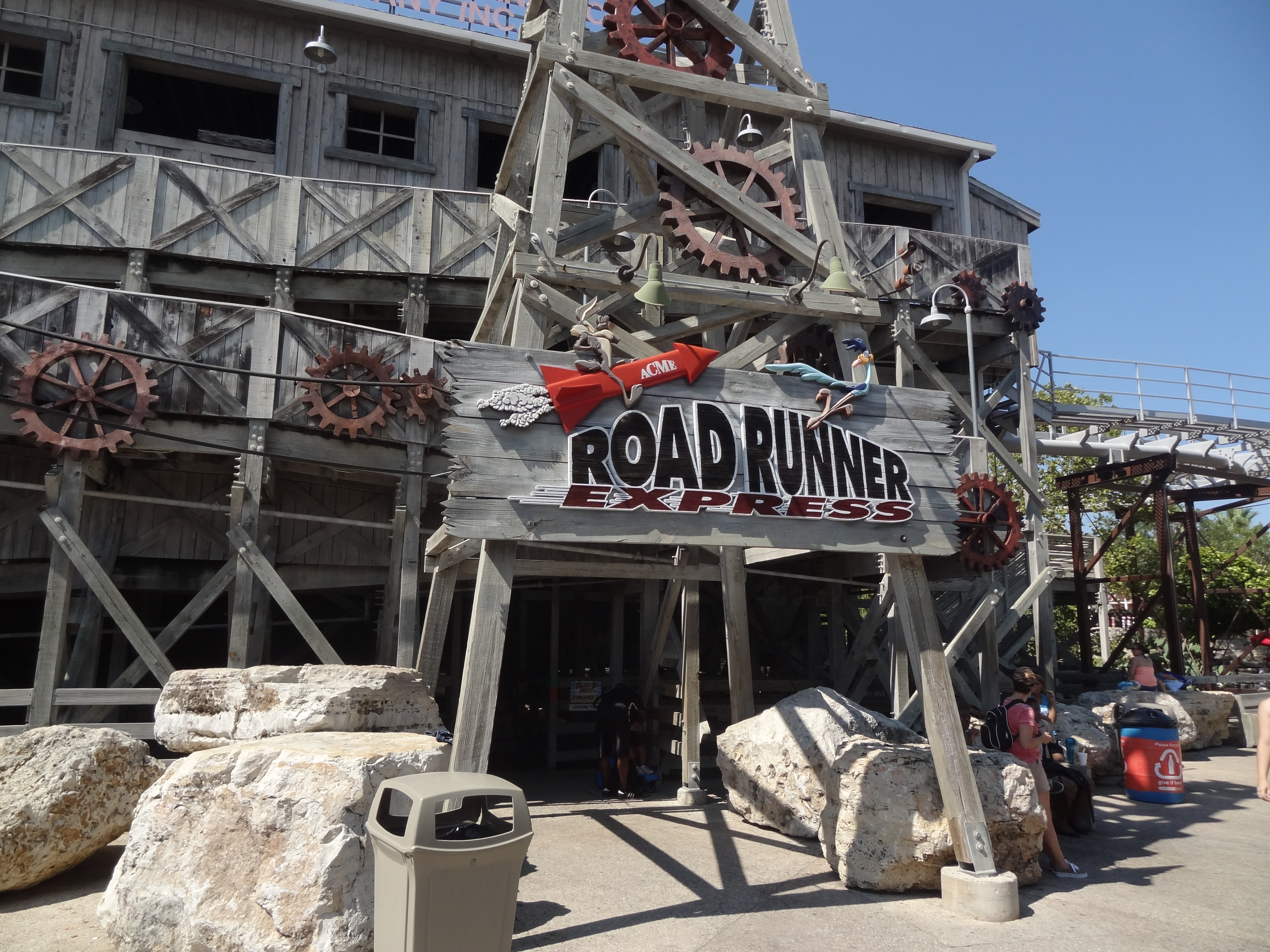
- The entrance to the attraction.

Six Flags Fiesta Texas
- Location: Six Flags Fiesta Texas
- Park section: Crackaxle Canyon
- Coordinates: 29.599149°N 98.612984°W
- Status: Operating
- Opening date: May 22, 1997

General statistics
- Type: Steel – Mine Train
- Manufacturer: Arrow Dynamics
- Designer: Alan Schilke
- Model: Mine Train
- Height: 73 ft (22 m)
- Drop: 67 ft (20 m)
- Length: 2,400 ft (730 m)
- Speed: 35 mph (56 km/h)
- Inversions: 0
- Duration: 2:24
- Max vertical angle: 27°
- Capacity: 1800 riders per hour
- G-force: 3.0
- Height restriction: 48 in (122 cm)
- Trains: 2 trains with 6 cars; riders arranged 2 across in 3 rows for a total of 36 riders per train
- Fast Lane available
- Road Runner Express at RCDB

Road Runner Express is a steel roller coaster located at Six Flags Fiesta Texas in San Antonio, Texas. It was built for the park's 1997 season and is the last mine train roller coaster ever to be built by Arrow Dynamics in a Six Flags theme park.

In contrast to most of the similarly named Road Runner Express coasters at Six Flags parks, Fiesta Texas' version is not a junior coaster, but a full-scale, though not extreme, family roller coaster. The target audience for the ride is families.

Some track portions of Road Runner Express pass under segments of the Iron Rattler roller coaster, as they sit next to each other in the park's Crackaxle Canyon.
