= Alan Schilke =

American engineer and roller coaster designer

- Born: 1965 (age 60–61); Idaho, U.S.
- Occupations: Design engineer at Ride Centerline LLC and Rocky Mountain Construction
- Known for: 4th Dimension roller coaster, I-Box track

Alan Schilke (/ʃɪlki/, shill-KEE) is an American engineer and roller coaster designer based in Hayden, Idaho. He first made his mark on the industry by designing the 4th Dimension roller coaster, X2, while working with Arrow Dynamics. Schilke founded Rides Centerline LLC and works as a design engineer and occasionally works with Rocky Mountain Construction (RMC).

== Education ==
Schilke got his bachelor's degree in civil engineering at Purdue University.

== Career ==
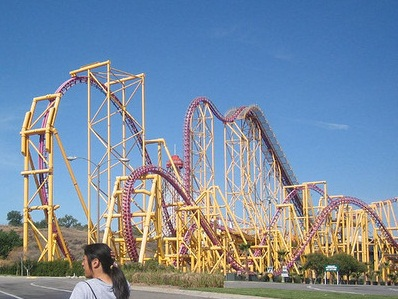
X at Six Flags Magic Mountain

Schilke worked with Arrow Dynamics for many years working his way up to the role of head engineer. During his time at Arrow Dynamics, Schilke was credited as the designer of Road Runner Express at Six Flags Fiesta Texas and Tennessee Tornado at Dollywood. Around the same time, Schilke came up with the concept of the 4th Dimension roller coaster. This concept was criticised by his colleagues at Arrow Dynamics for being too extreme and impossible to engineer. The project only got off the ground when Six Flags' President Gary Story asked the company to develop a scaled-down prototype. This then led to the design of X, later renamed X2, which was installed at Six Flags Magic Mountain in 2001.

In December 2001, Arrow Dynamics filed for Chapter 11 bankruptcy, with the company being purchased by S&S Worldwide the following year. As part of the acquisition, Schilke (among many others) designed coasters for S&S Worldwide, heading up the wooden roller coaster division that produced four roller coasters in 2003 and 2004.

In 2006, Schilke along with Ned Hansen founded Ride Centerline LLC, an independent engineering firm in Hyde Park, Utah. Schilke continued to work with S&S and is responsible for the outward banking turn found on the S&S El Loco coasters such as Steel Hawg at Indiana Beach. In 2009 Schilke began providing design and engineering work for Rocky Mountain Construction, a company that specializes in the construction of roller coasters, water parks, steel buildings, miniature golf courses and go kart tracks. Schilke along with Rocky Mountain Construction founder Fred Grubb went on to design Iron Horse track (now known as I-Box track), an all-steel track replacement system for wooden roller coasters. The first installation of this track technology debuted on the New Texas Giant at Six Flags Over Texas in 2011.

In addition to providing designs for the amusement industry, Schilke and Hansen have worked with the Oceana Energy Company on the design and patent of water turbines to harness power from rivers and ocean tides.

== Projects ==
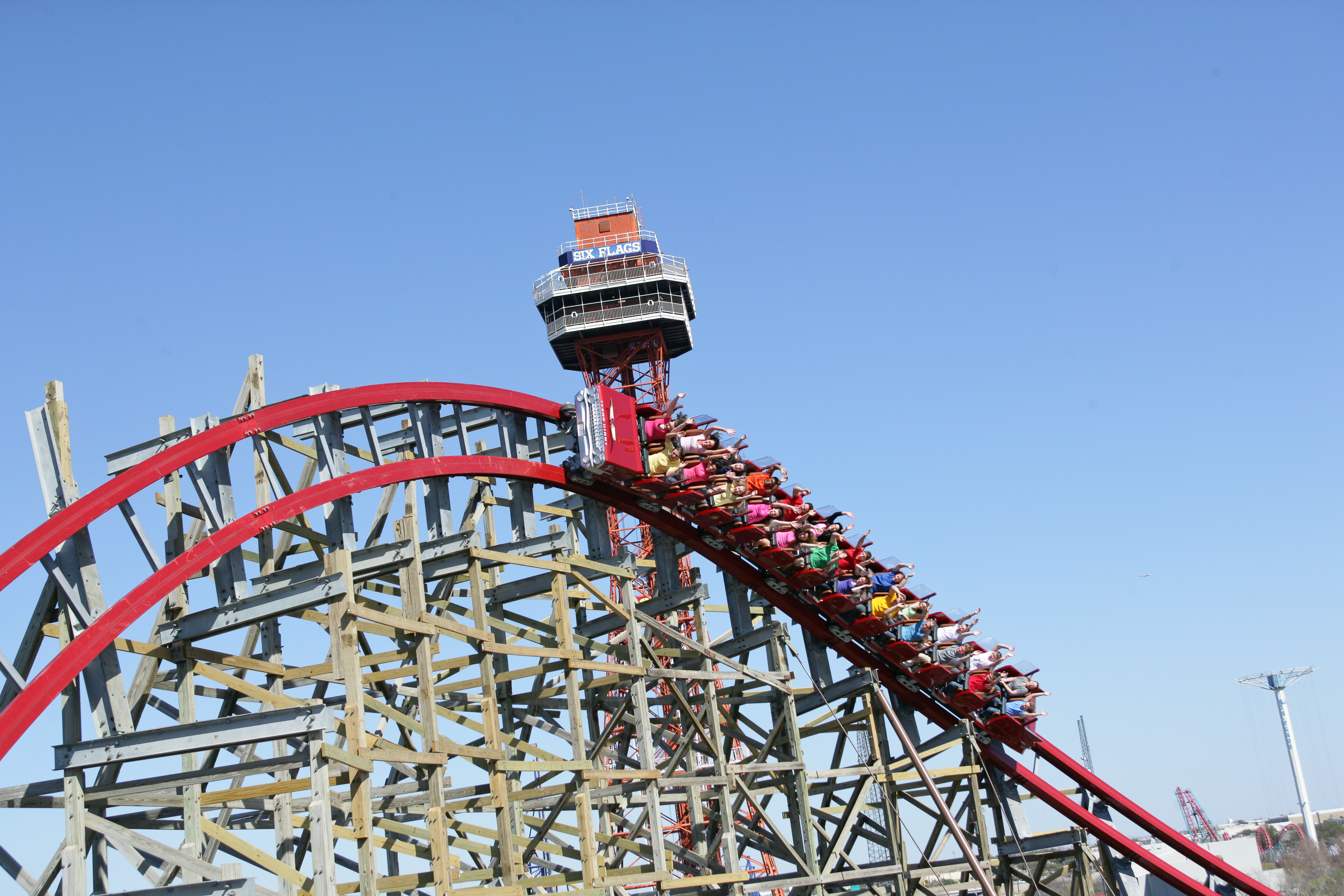
New Texas Giant at Six Flags Over Texas

As an employee of Arrow Dynamics

- Road Runner Express at Six Flags Fiesta Texas
- Tennessee Tornado at Dollywood
- X2 at Six Flags Magic Mountain

As an employee/consultant of S&S Arrow/S&S Worldwide

- Timberhawk: Ride of Prey at Wild Waves Theme Park
- Falken at Fårup Sommerland
- Avalanche at Timber Falls Adventure Park
- Hell Cat at Clementon Amusement Park
- Eejanaika at Fuji-Q Highland
- Steel Hawg at Indiana Beach
- Batman: The Ride at Six Flags Fiesta Texas

As a consultant to Rocky Mountain Construction

- New Texas Giant at Six Flags Over Texas
- Outlaw Run at Silver Dollar City
- Iron Rattler at Six Flags Fiesta Texas
- Goliath at Six Flags Great America
- Medusa Steel Coaster at Six Flags Mexico
- Twisted Colossus at Six Flags Magic Mountain
- Wicked Cyclone at Six Flags New England
- The Joker at Six Flags Discovery Kingdom
- Wind Chaser at Kentucky Kingdom
- Lightning Rod at Dollywood
- Wildfire at Kolmarden Wildlife Park
- Steel Vengeance at Cedar Point
- Twisted Timbers at Kings Dominion
- Wonder Woman Golden Lasso Coaster at Six Flags Fiesta Texas
- RailBlazer at California's Great America
- Twisted Cyclone at Six Flags Over Georgia
- Untamed at Walibi Holland
- Hakugei at Nagashima Spa Land
- Zadra at Energylandia
- Iron Gwazi at Busch Gardens Tampa Bay
- Jersey Devil Coaster at Six Flags Great Adventure
- Stunt Pilot at Silverwood Theme Park
