= Hurler (roller coaster) =

Wooden coasters at Cedar Fair parks

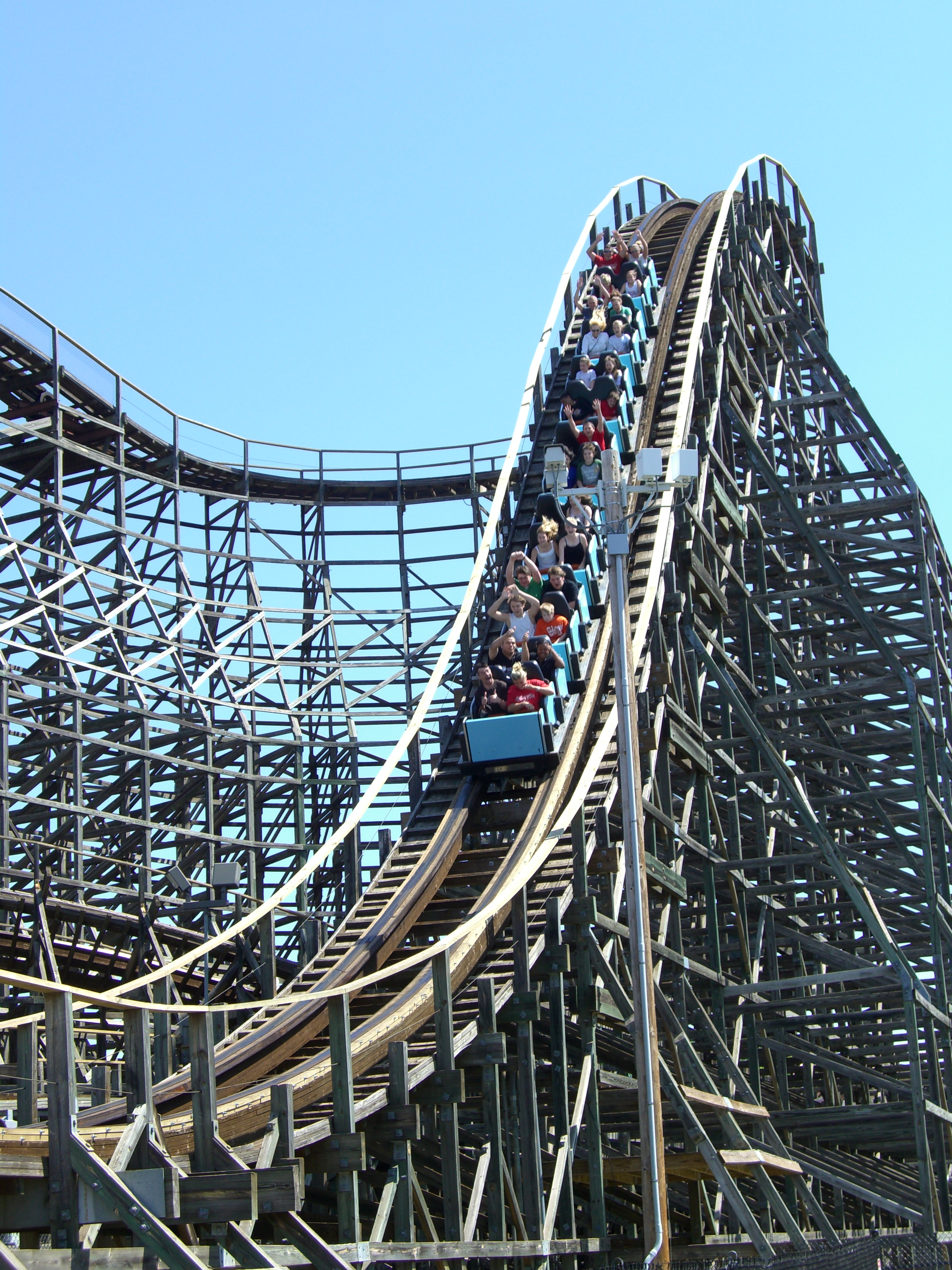
- Hurler's first drop at Carowinds

Carowinds
- Park section: Thrill Zone
- Coordinates: 35°06′18.88″N 80°56′37.39″W
- Status: Operating
- Opening date: June 4, 1994

Kings Dominion
- Park section: Candy Apple Grove
- Coordinates: 37°50′10.81″N 77°26′44.29″W
- Status: Removed
- Opening date: April 28, 1994
- Closing date: November 1, 2015
- Replaced by: Twisted Timbers

General statistics
- Type: Wood
- Manufacturer: International Coasters, Inc.
- Track layout: Triple out and back
- Lift/launch system: Chain lift hill
- Height: 83 ft (25 m)
- Length: 3,157 ft (962 m)
- Speed: 50 mph (80 km/h)
- Inversions: 0
- Duration: 2:00
- Capacity: 1100 riders per hour
- G-force: 4.1
- Height restriction: 48 in (122 cm)
- Trains: 2 trains with 7 cars; riders arranged 2 across in 2 rows for a total of 28 riders per train
- Fast Lane available
- Hurler at RCDB

Hurler is a wooden roller coaster located at Carowinds amusement park in Charlotte, North Carolina. A second identical installation of the ride was also built at Kings Dominion, and both locations opened to the public in 1994. The Hurler at Kings Dominion was closed following the 2015 season and was renovated by Rocky Mountain Construction, re-emerging as a hybrid coaster in 2018 named Twisted Timbers.

== History ==
On September 9, 1993, Carowinds announced that they would be receiving an 8-acre (3.2 ha) themed area based on the Wayne's World films. This new area would feature a variety of restaurants and stores. In addition, the centerpiece attraction would be a wooden roller coaster named "Hurler". It was billed as the first movie-themed wooden roller coaster in the United States. That same month, Kings Dominion announced that they would be getting their own Wayne's World section and a Hurler clone.

Both installations of Hurler opened in 1994. The Kings Dominion location first opened for a special preview on April 28, 1994. On hand for the coaster's inaugural ride were Wayne and Garth impersonators, as well as Tia Carrere, who played Wayne's love interest Cassandra Wong in the films. Less than two months later on June 4, the Carowinds location would officially open to the general public. The coasters originally borrowed their theme from the films, whose main characters frequently used the word "hurl". Paramount sold both parks in 2006, and new owner Cedar Fair retained the name but removed references to Wayne's World.

During the 2013-2014 off-season, the Carowinds installation received a retracking from Great Coasters International. Hurler closed again for part of the 2014 season for regular maintenance. In March 2016, a "closure" notice was posted on the park's website and published on the park map indicating that the ride would not operate at all throughout the season. The website cited "extensive maintenance" as the reason.

A video released in October 2016 on Kings Dominion's Facebook page announced that their Hurler was closing permanently, showing a headstone with its name and years of operation (1994–2016). The video ended with a teaser stating: "for now", indicating it may be refurbished and reopened. In August 2017, the park confirmed that Hurler would re-emerge in 2018 as a hybrid roller coaster called "Twisted Timbers". The Carowinds version of the ride remains the original for the time being.

== Ride layout ==
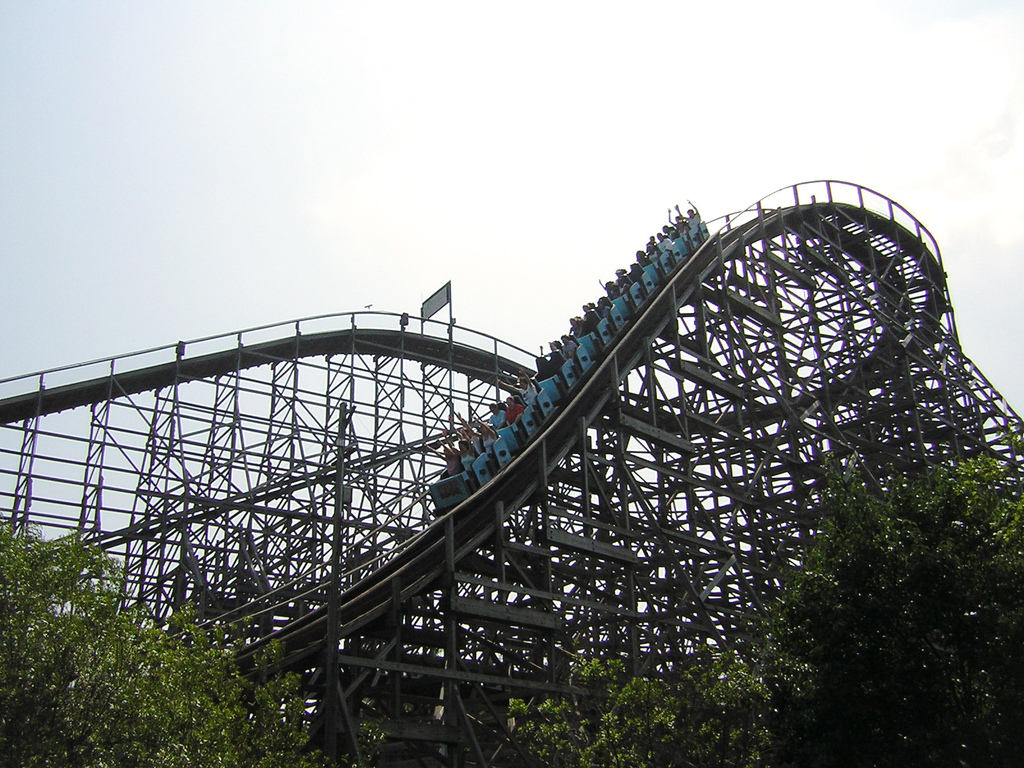
Hurler's first drop at Kings Dominion

After a right hand turn out of the station, riders ascend an 83-foot (25 m) lift hill, followed by a small right hand turn before reaching the first drop. During the drop, an on-ride camera takes photographs of passengers. The ride momentarily flattens out before turning right through a wide and heavily banked flat turn. The train traverses a series of airtime hills and another wide, right hand banked turn. Following the second large turn, the train traverses another series of airtime hills, followed by an elevated right hand banked turn. Following this is another smaller airtime hill, another large, right hand banked turn, and one final airtime hill into the final brake run before returning to the station. The overall layout is a standard paperclip layout with two out-and-back style runs (at Kings Dominion this extended into the courtyard adjacent to Grizzly).

Hurler is also a mirror image of Woodland Run at Kentucky Kingdom.

== Theming ==
Originally, the queue wound underneath the coaster through a "hot set" on location filming scenes from Wayne's World. Upon entering the station building, park guests passed through a full-scale set of the iconic basement hideout of Wayne and Garth. Since removal of the Paramount references, the queue and station building are loosely themed with the remains of the original theming. Movie-making paraphernalia including stage lights, cameras, props and signs are scattered sparsely about. At Carowinds, some of the original props (notably baby doll pieces) were recycled into the SCarowinds Maze of Madness. Although the Wayne's World theme has been removed from the coaster at Kings Dominion, many signs of the theme were still present until the ride's closure, including many stickers and stamps of the Wayne's World logo around the Hurler station, such as the columns by the exit.
