= New Texas Giant =

Roller coaster at Six Flags Over Texas

- Previously known as Texas Giant

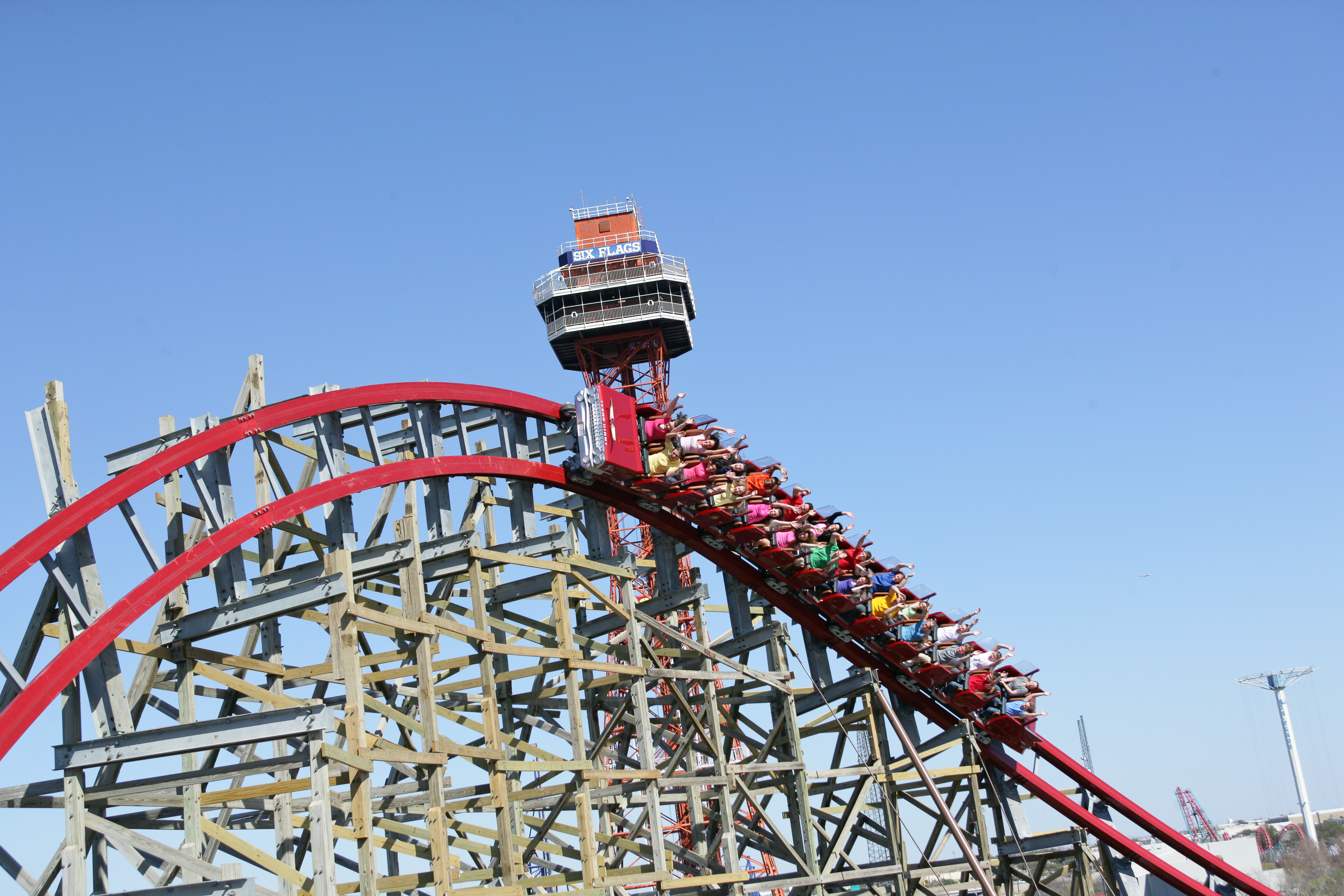
- New Texas Giant features steel track and overbanked turns

Six Flags Over Texas
- Location: Six Flags Over Texas
- Park section: Texas
- Coordinates: 32°45′23″N 97°4′23″W
- Status: Operating
- Opening date: April 22, 2011
- Cost: $10 million
- Replaced: Texas Giant

General statistics
- Type: Steel
- Manufacturer: Rocky Mountain Construction
- Designer: Alan Schilke
- Model: I-Box – Custom
- Lift/launch system: Chain lift hill
- Height: 153 ft (47 m)
- Drop: 147 ft (45 m)
- Length: 4,200 ft (1,300 m)
- Speed: 65 mph (105 km/h)
- Inversions: 0
- Max vertical angle: 79°
- Height restriction: 48 in (122 cm)
- Trains: 3 trains with 6 cars; riders arranged 2 across in 2 rows for a total of 24 riders per train
- Fast Lane available
- New Texas Giant at RCDB

New Texas Giant is a steel roller coaster located at Six Flags Over Texas in Arlington, Texas. It originally opened as Texas Giant, which was the tallest wooden coaster in the world when it debuted in 1990. Manufactured by Dinn Corporation and designed by Curtis D. Summers, Texas Giant operated for nearly two decades and was highly-ranked in Amusement Today magazine's annual Golden Ticket Awards. Before its refurbishment, the ride's popularity declined over the years as it gained a negative reputation for increasing roughness.

Texas Giant closed in 2009 for a major refurbishment by Rocky Mountain Construction (RMC). It reemerged as New Texas Giant in 2011. While the coaster retained much of the original wooden support structure, the wooden track was replaced with RMC's steel I-Box track, making this the first roller coaster to feature the I-Box track, as well as the first roller coaster that was converted by RMC. The renovated hybrid coaster saw an increase in height from 143 to 153 feet (44 to 47 m) and drop length from 137 to 147 feet (42 to 45 m), as well as a steeper drop angle of 79°. New Texas Giant also increased the angle of multiple banked turns producing steeper angles.

New Texas Giant was well-received, winning Best New Ride in the 2011 Golden Ticket Awards and ranking highly in industry polls. A fatal incident occurred on July 19, 2013, and resulted in modifications to the ride's restraint system.

== History ==
In September 1989, Six Flags announced the hiring of Dinn Corporation to build two new wooden roller coasters, with Curtis D. Summers as the designer. One would go to Six Flags Over Texas as The Texas Giant and the other would go to Six Flags Over Georgia as Georgia Cyclone.

Construction had already started in June 1989. The Texas Giant was constructed using over 900,000 board feet (2,100 m^{3}) of wood. The trains were manufactured by Philadelphia Toboggan Coasters. The Texas Giant officially opened on March 17, 1990. At opening, the ride was the world's tallest wooden roller coaster, standing 143 feet (44 m) high.

Following the ride's opening it had several modifications and renovations, which included reprofiling parts of the ride, shortening the seven-car trains to six-car trains, and performing maintenance on the wooden track. Six Flags Over Texas performed over 1,200 feet (370 m) of trackwork on the ride in the 2008–2009 offseason, with the ultimate aim of improving the ride's smoothness. Although the maintenance did improve the ride, park officials needed a more permanent solution. Initial speculation indicated the ride would be removed entirely from the park; however, Six Flags Over Texas denied any intention or consideration to do so. In March 2009, the park announced the closure of Texas Giant prior to a $10 million renovation. Following Fright Fest for that year, the ride closed on November 1, 2009.

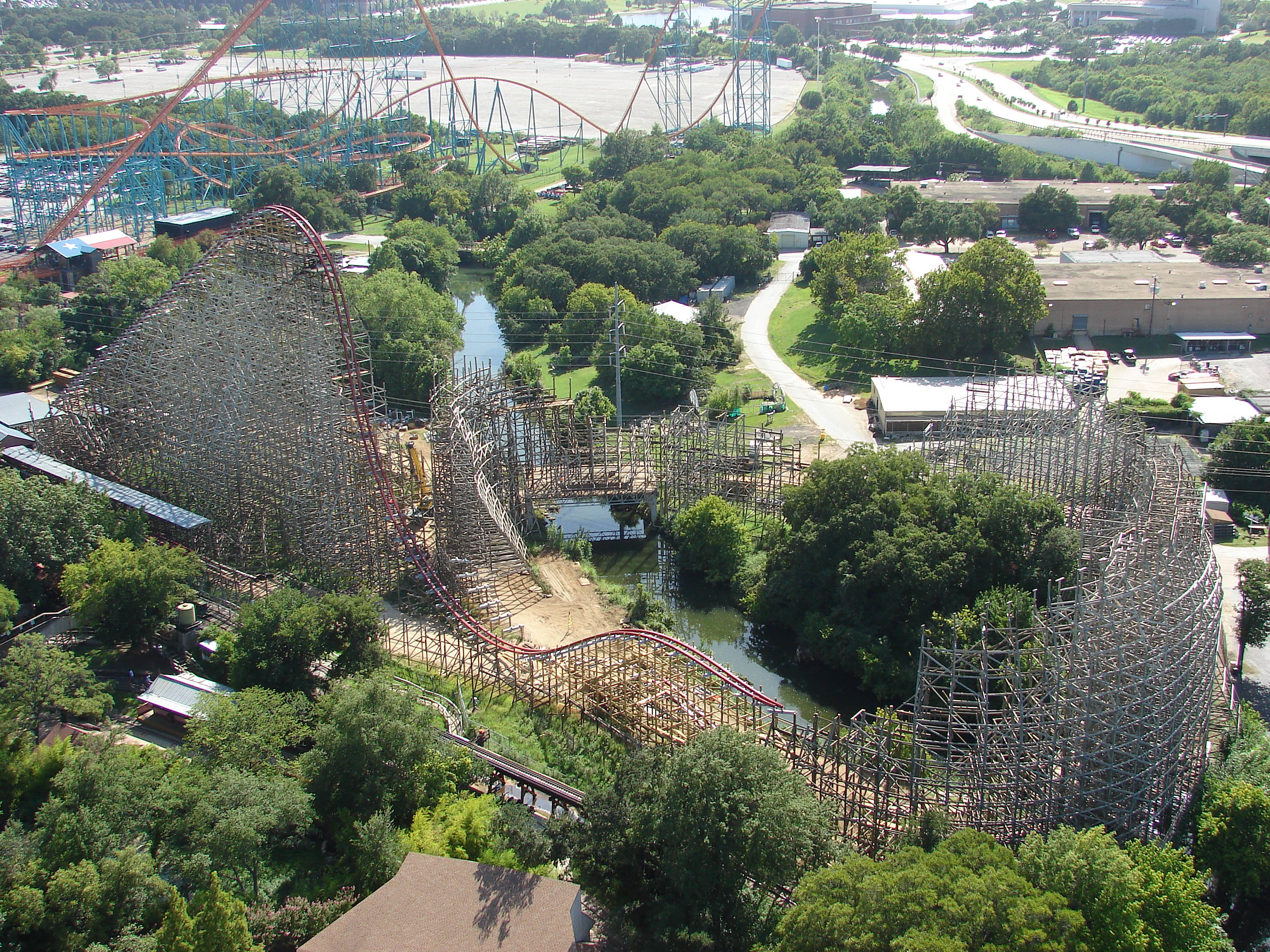
Texas Giant during its renovation

Renovations began almost immediately and involved the removal of all of the wooden track and modifications to some of the support structure. On March 3, 2010, Six Flags Over Texas and Rocky Mountain Construction (RMC) unveiled the steel I-Box track which would be used on the refurbished ride. The track was developed over the course of three years by RMC owner Fred Grubb, and Ride Centerline, LLC engineers Alan Schilke and Dody Bachtar. The steel track was designed to be a replacement for any existing wooden track structure, with the rail shape, approximate weight, and dimensions remaining the same. Schilke designed the modifications to the layout, giving specifications to Grubb for manufacturing at RMC's Idaho plant. There, two-dimensional plates of steel were machine-welded to form the three-dimensional track parts. The redevelopment saw much of the track get reprofiled; the lift hill was increased by 10 feet (3.0 m), the first drop was steepened to 79 degrees, and several overbanked turns (ranging from 90° to 115°) were added. In October 2010, Six Flags announced that the renovated ride would be called the New Texas Giant. It opened on April 22, 2011.

== Characteristics ==
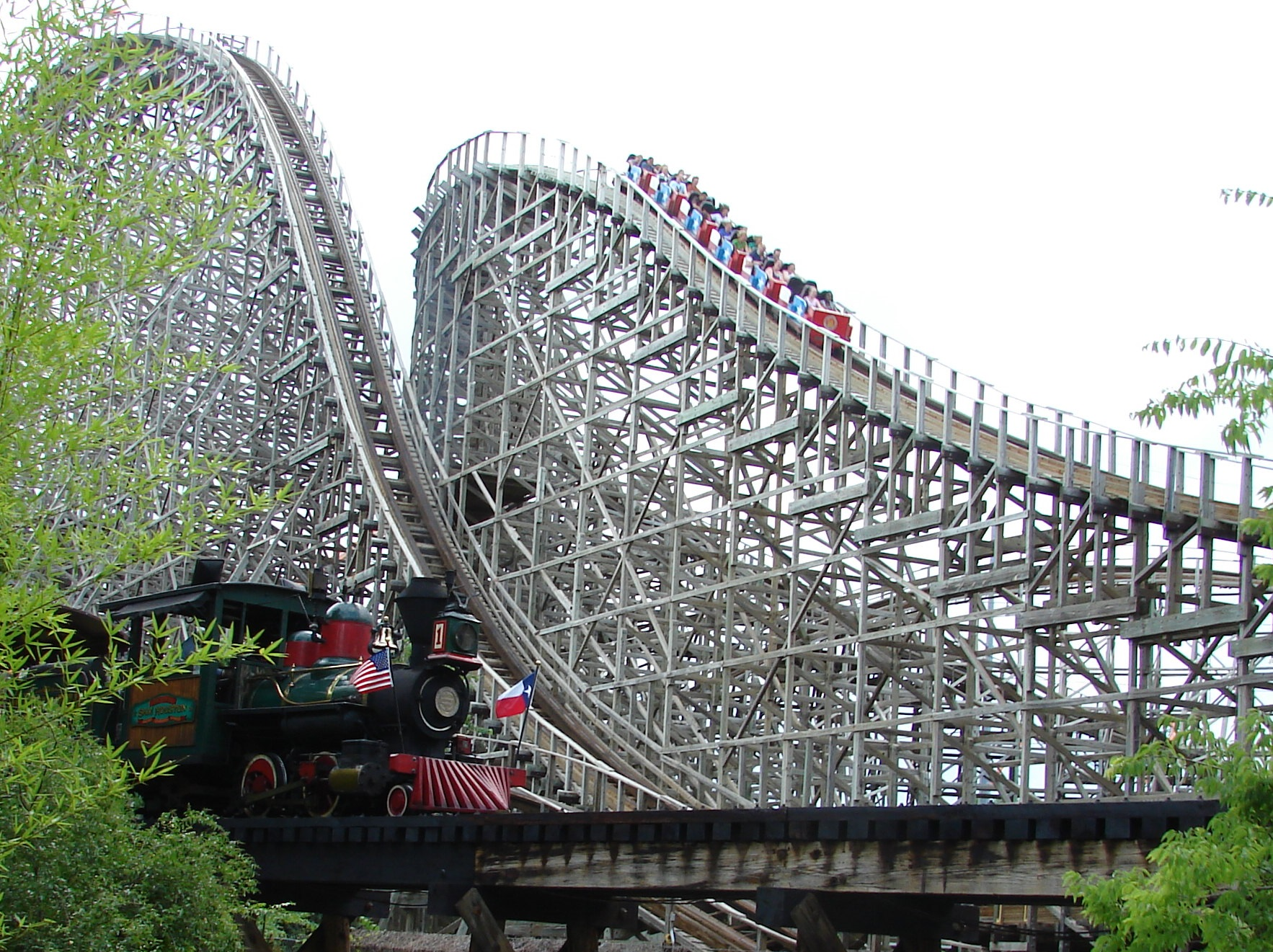
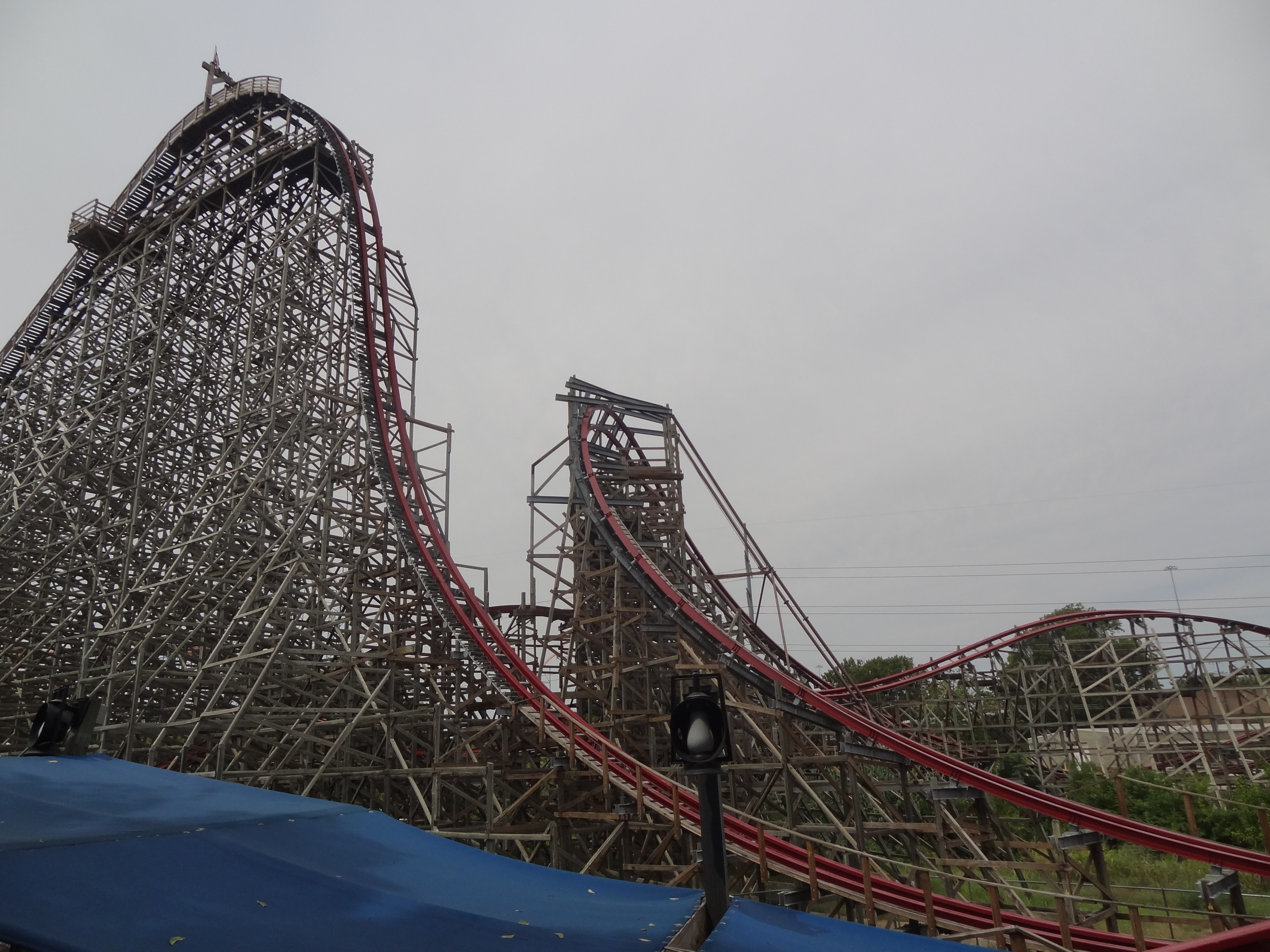
The Texas Giant before and after its renovation, showcasing the profile of the first drop and a turnaround. The renovated ride features a steeper and longer first drop, as well as several overbanked turns up to 115° (pictured).

As the name suggests, New Texas Giant is located within the Texas section of Six Flags Over Texas. It was Rocky Mountain Construction's first installation of I-Box track. New Texas Giant operates with three trains manufactured by Gerstlauer. There are three trains (colored red, blue, and black) themed to 1961 Cadillac Devilles. Each train is made up of six cars, each seating riders in two rows of two. Riders are restrained through the use of an individual hydraulic lap bar and a seat belt.

The original Texas Giant by Dinn Corporation was 10 feet (3.0 m) lower in height than its Rocky Mountain Construction counterpart. The refurbished New Texas Giant features a steeper and longer first drop, and therefore achieves a faster maximum speed. Additionally, a 540° helix after the mid-course brake run was converted into a 180° turnaround, resulting in its track length being shortened by approximately 400 feet (120 m).

Statistic	Texas Giant	New Texas Giant
Years	1990–2009	2011–present
Manufacturer	Dinn Corporation	Rocky Mountain Construction
Designer	Curtis D. Summers	Alan Schilke
Track	Wood	Steel
Height	143 ft or 44 m	153 ft or 47 m
Drop	137 ft or 42 m	147 ft or 45 m
Length	4,920 ft or 1,500 m	4,200 ft or 1,300 m
Speed	62 mph or 100 km/h	65 mph or 105 km/h
Max vertical angle	53°	79°
Trains	Philadelphia Toboggan Coasters (PTC)	Gerstlauer

== Ride experience ==
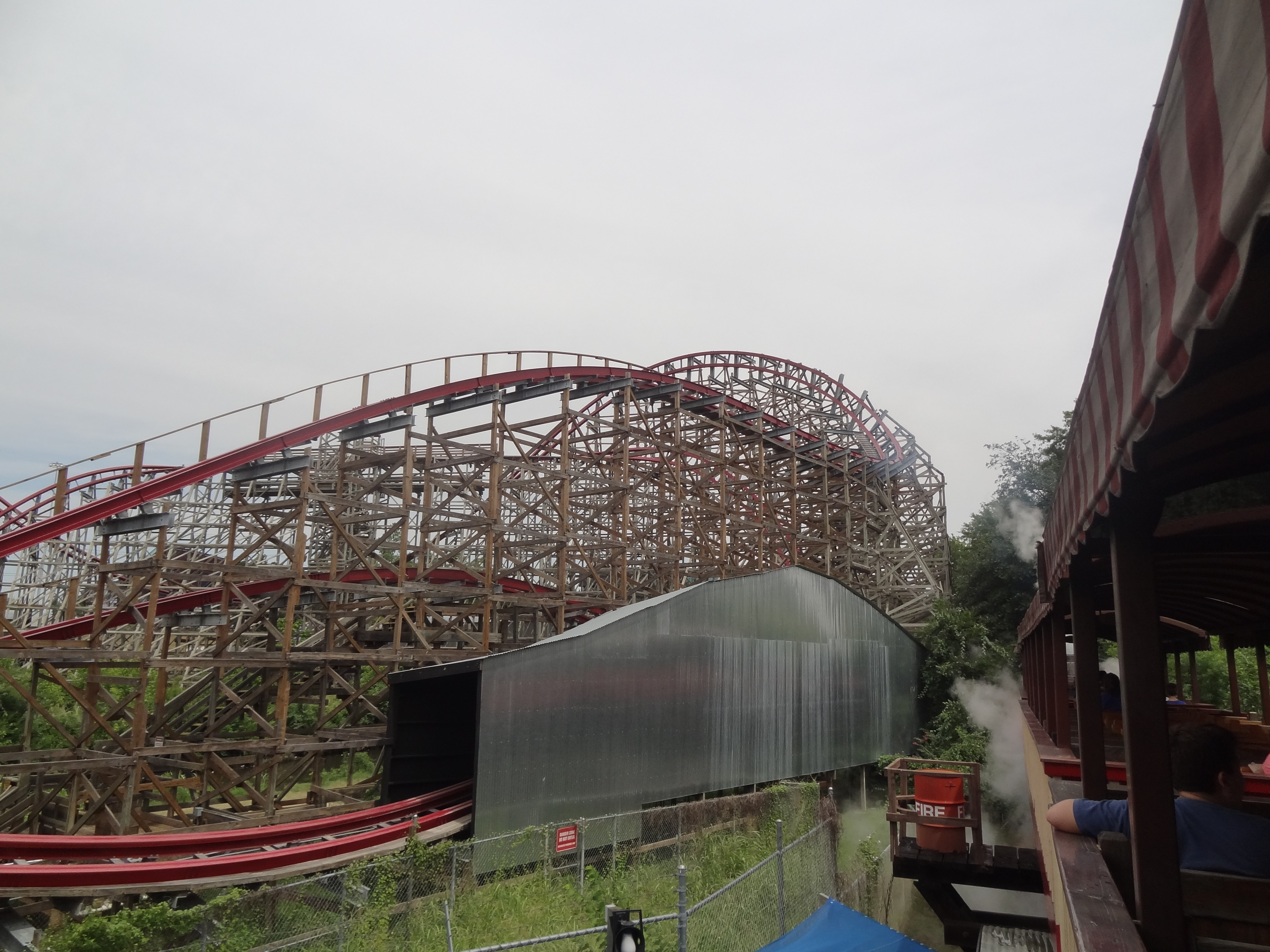
An overview of part of the New Texas Giant's layout including the double up, 90° overbanked turn, and final tunnel

The New Texas Giant begins with a right turn out of the station. This leads directly to a 153-foot-tall (47 m) chain lift hill. Once at the top, riders drop 147 feet (45 m) at an angle of 79°. A double up leads into a 90° overbanked turn, a dip and a 95° overbanked turn. Another dip and rise leads the train into a 115° overbanked turn. The exit from the overbanked turn leads into a small air-time hill, which delivers the greatest negative g-force on the ride, before ascending up into the mid-course brake run. The train drops from the brake run and continues through a series of low-to-the-ground air-time hills and directional changes. This runs through three separate tunnels, finishing with the final brake run and short path back to the station.

== Reception ==
The original Texas Giant was well received, though its popularity had declined towards the end of its operation. Following its 2010 renovation, the ride's popularity returned.

In Amusement Today's Golden Ticket Awards Texas Giant ranked as the number one wooden roller coaster for 1998 and 1999. Its ranking slowly declined to position 32 in 2009, its final year of operation as a wooden roller coaster. Following its 2010 renovation, the New Texas Giant again ranked highly in the Golden Ticket Awards (this time amongst steel roller coasters), achieving ranks of 6 and 5 in 2011 and 2012, respectively. The ride also won a Golden Ticket Award for being the Best New Ride of 2011.

Golden Ticket Awards: Top wood Roller Coasters
Year									1998	1999
Ranking									1	1
Year	2000	2001	2002	2003	2004	2005	2006	2007	2008	2009
Ranking	3	8	8	10	9	12	14	20	28	32
Year	2010	2011	2012	2013	2014	2015	2016	2017	2018	2019
Ranking	–	–	–	–	–	–	–	–	–	–
Year	2020	2021	2022	2023	2024	2025	2026			
Ranking	N/A	–	–	–	–	–	–			

Golden Ticket Awards: Top Hybrid Roller Coasters
Year									1998	1999
Ranking									–	–
Year	2000	2001	2002	2003	2004	2005	2006	2007	2008	2009
Ranking	–	–	–	–	–	–	–	–	–	–
Year	2010	2011	2012	2013	2014	2015	2016	2017	2018	2019
Ranking	–	6	5	6	8	10	16	9	23	26
Year	2020	2021	2022	2023	2024	2025	2026			
Ranking	N/A	36	42	–	–	–	–			

== Incidents ==
On July 19, 2013, a 52-year-old woman fell to her death while riding New Texas Giant. The ride was closed indefinitely pending further investigation. After its investigation, the park stated on September 10, 2013, that mechanical failure was not to blame. The ride reopened on September 14, 2013, after redesigned restraint bars, pads, and seat belts were installed on all three trains. The incident resulted in the introduction of seat belts as a precaution on other roller coasters throughout the Six Flags chain.

Preceded by Le Monstre	World's Tallest Wooden Roller Coaster; 1990–May 1991	Succeeded by Mean Streak
