= Rocky's Rapids =

Rocky's Rapids is a Log Flume ride at Indiana Beach, in Monticello, Indiana. The ride is located next to the Cornball Express, and boats occasionally duel with trains from the roller coaster. The park does not have a Rapids ride, so this is one of the park's only water rides. The ride is located near Cornball Express and is also not far from Indiana Beach's two other coasters, Hoosier Hurricane and the steel coaster, Steel Hawg.

== Ride Description ==
After the 4 person boats are loaded, they slide off the loading conveyor into the channel, where they make a gradual left-hand turn into the first tunnel, which crosses under the lift hill. After emerging from the tunnel, boats turn right and meander along, before turning right into the second tunnel. After emerging, boats make a left-hand turn, followed by a 180 degree turnaround onto the lift hill. As the boats ascend, the familiar click-clack of the anti-slide back device is heard. At the top, boats descend the drop, passing through an on-ride camera, before making a left hand u-turn into the station.
