= Galaxyland =

Amusement park in Edmonton, Alberta, Canada

Galaxyland Powered by Hasbro
- Previously known as Fantasyland (1983–1994); Galaxyland (1995–2022)
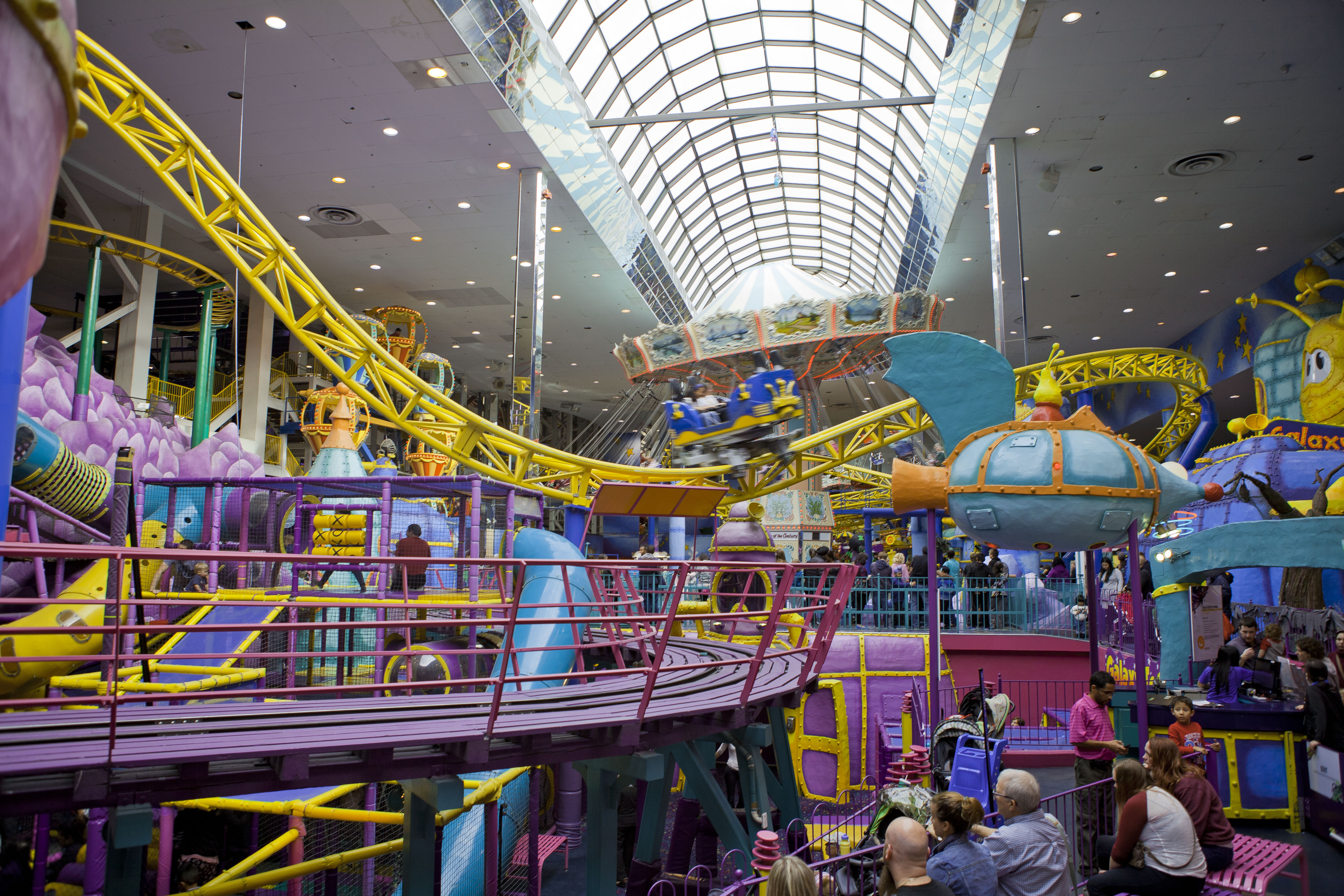
- Interior of Galaxyland
- Interactive map of Galaxyland Powered by Hasbro
- Location: West Edmonton Mall, Edmonton, Alberta, Canada
- Coordinates: 53°31′25″N 113°37′15″W
- Status: Operating
- Opened: August 17, 1983; 43 years ago
- Owner: Triple Five Group
- Operated by: Triple Five Group
- General manager: Devin Carradine
- Theme: Fantasy (1983–1994); Space (1995–2022); Hasbro, Space (2022–present)
- Slogan: Countless thrills await you...
- Operating season: Year-round
- Area: 165,000 square feet (15,300 m^{2})

Attractions
- Total: 26
- Roller coasters: 3
- Website: https://www.wem.ca/play/attractions/galaxyland

Galaxyland Powered by Hasbro (formerly Galaxyland and Fantasyland) is an indoor amusement park located in the West Edmonton Mall in Edmonton, Alberta, Canada. It was home to the world's tallest (14 stories) and longest indoor roller coaster, the Mindbender. It is also home to the Space Shot, the world's tallest indoor tower ride at the time of opening, at 36.5 metres (120 ft). The record was broken by Nickelodeon Skyline Scream at American Dream Meadowlands in East Rutherford, New Jersey in 2019.

== History ==
The amusement park, then known as Fantasyland, held its grand opening on August 17, 1983 as part of the mall's phase 2 expansion. It was built at a cost of $9 million and featured 100,000 square feet (9,300 m^{2}) of space and also included a supervised daycare. On March 15, 1986, the park officially opened its expansion with the addition of new rides such as the Drop of Doom, Perilous Pendulum, and Mindbender (which opened earlier on December 20, 1985). An appellate court ruled on March 11, 1994 that the name "Fantasyland" was already legally in use for one of the lands of the themes existing in Disneyland and other theme parks, like the Magic Kingdom in Walt Disney World, Hong Kong Disneyland, Disneyland Park in Paris, Tokyo Disneyland, and Shanghai Disneyland Park, owned by the Walt Disney Company. The lawsuit forced the mall's owners to change the park's name, though they were allowed to continue using the name "Fantasyland Hotel" for a hotel in the mall. Fantasyland became Galaxyland officially on July 1, 1995. This was celebrated with a new Space Age theme and the arrival of the park's new mascot, "Cosmo".

On December 18, 2019, it was announced that Galaxyland would undergo a renovation to be completed by late 2020, featuring new attractions licensed from Hasbro franchises. The park held its grand re-opening as "Galaxyland Powered by Hasbro" on December 17, 2022 with the completion of the first phase of the renovation. The second phase was expected to be completed by 2023.

Galaxyland remained closed for most of the 2020 season due to the COVID-19 pandemic.

=== 1986 Mindbender accident ===
On June 14, 1986, a wheel sheared off the last car on the train of the Mindbender and the train crashed at high speed into a concrete pillar, killing three of the ride's occupants and severely injuring one. The ride had several safety improvements, including more routine maintenance checks and three emergency brake sections added to the track.

== Rides ==
There are a total of 26 different rides operating in Galaxyland.

=== List of rides ===
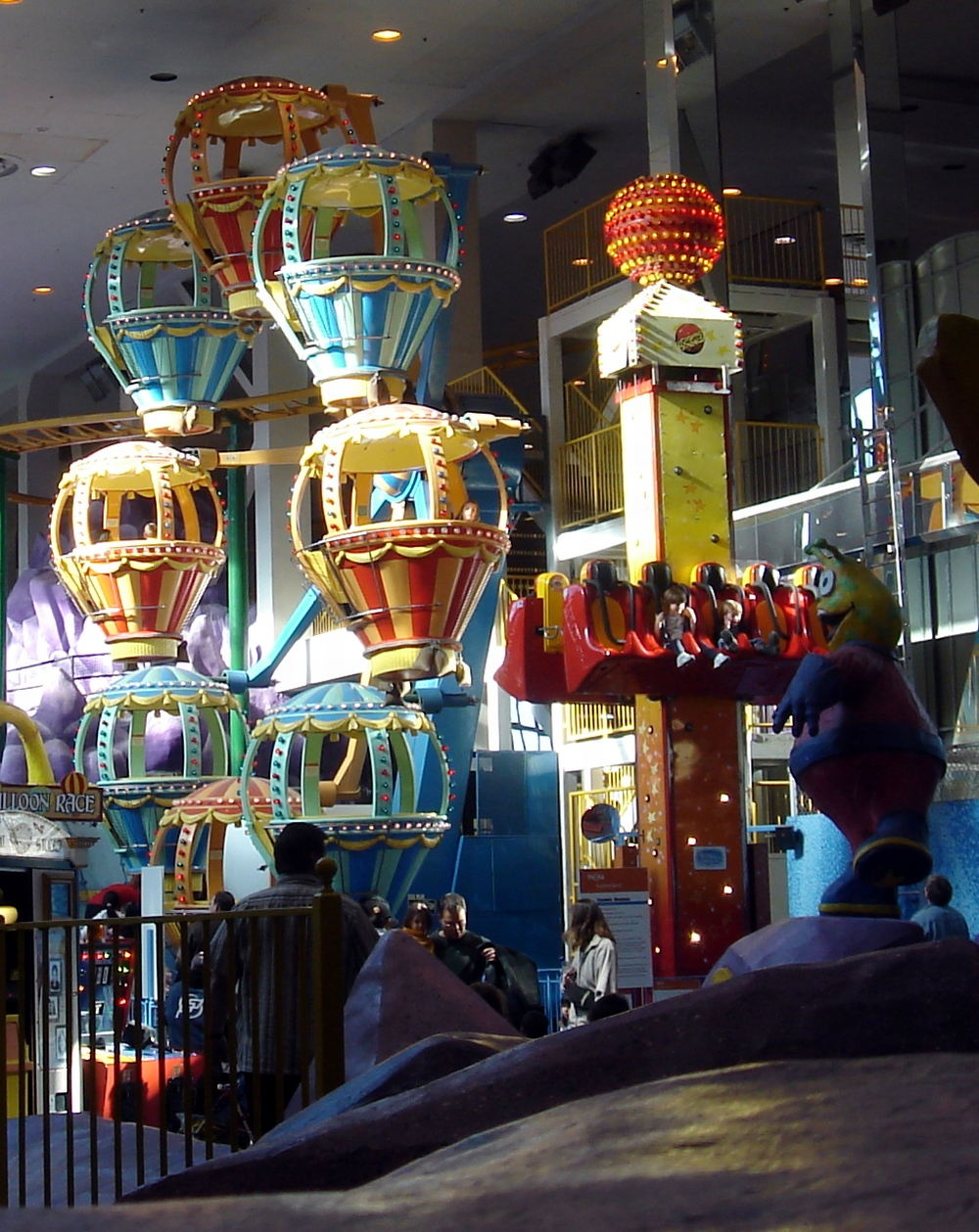
Balloon Race and the Cosmic Bounce before retheming to the My Little Pony franchise, to the names Flight to Equestria and Rainbow Bounce respectively. Also visible are Cosmo's Space Fountain (in the foreground, and removed in the Great Galaxyland Ride Shuffle of 2015–2017), a small portion of the Cootie Coaster (near the three highest balloons, as Autosled in this image), and Rainbow Bounce (to the right of Flight to Equestria, as Cosmic Bounce in this image).

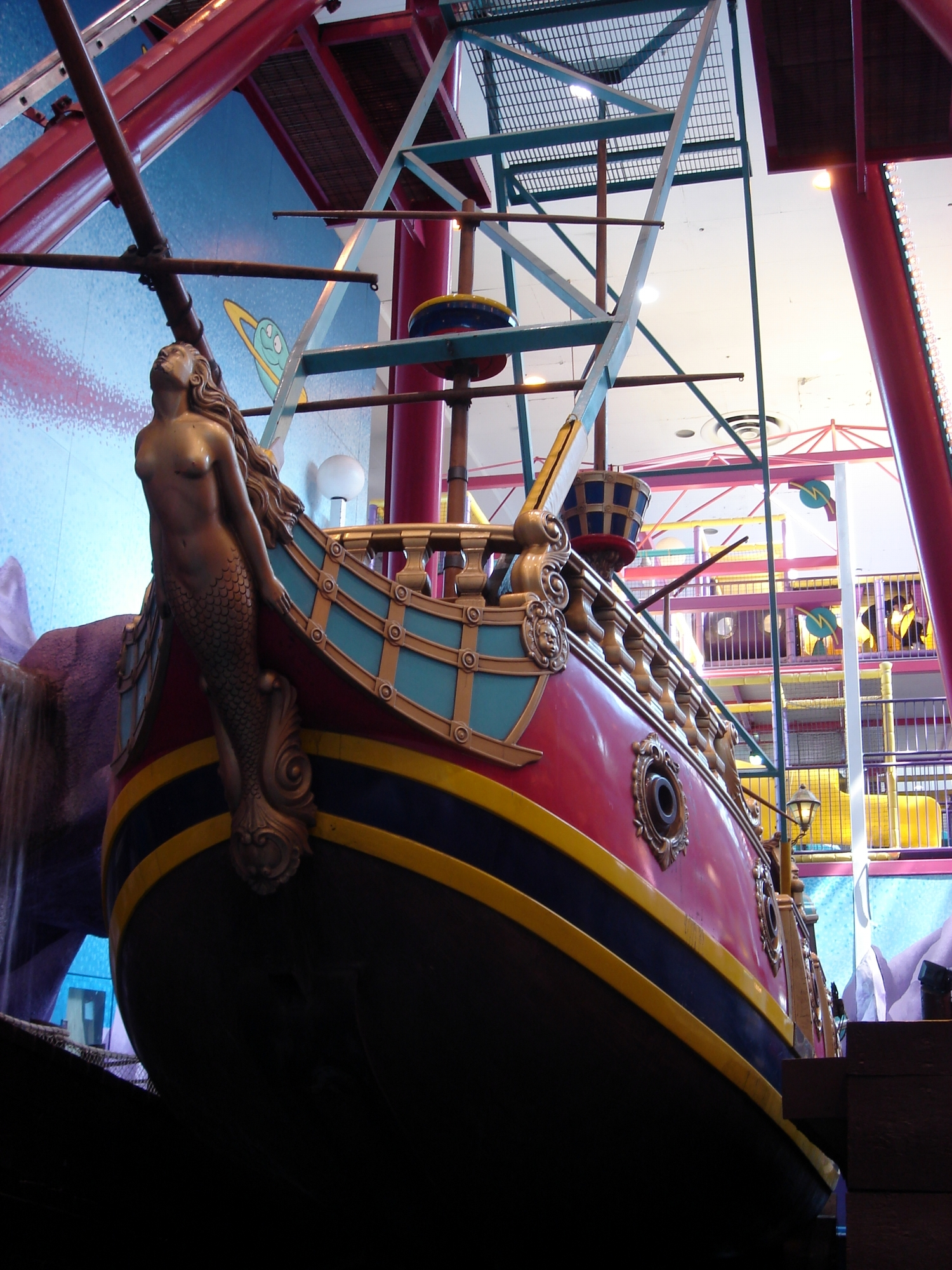
Flying Galleon's old location before retheming into Mr. Potato Head, circa October 2006. Also visible is the Galaxy Kids Playpark in the background before retheming.

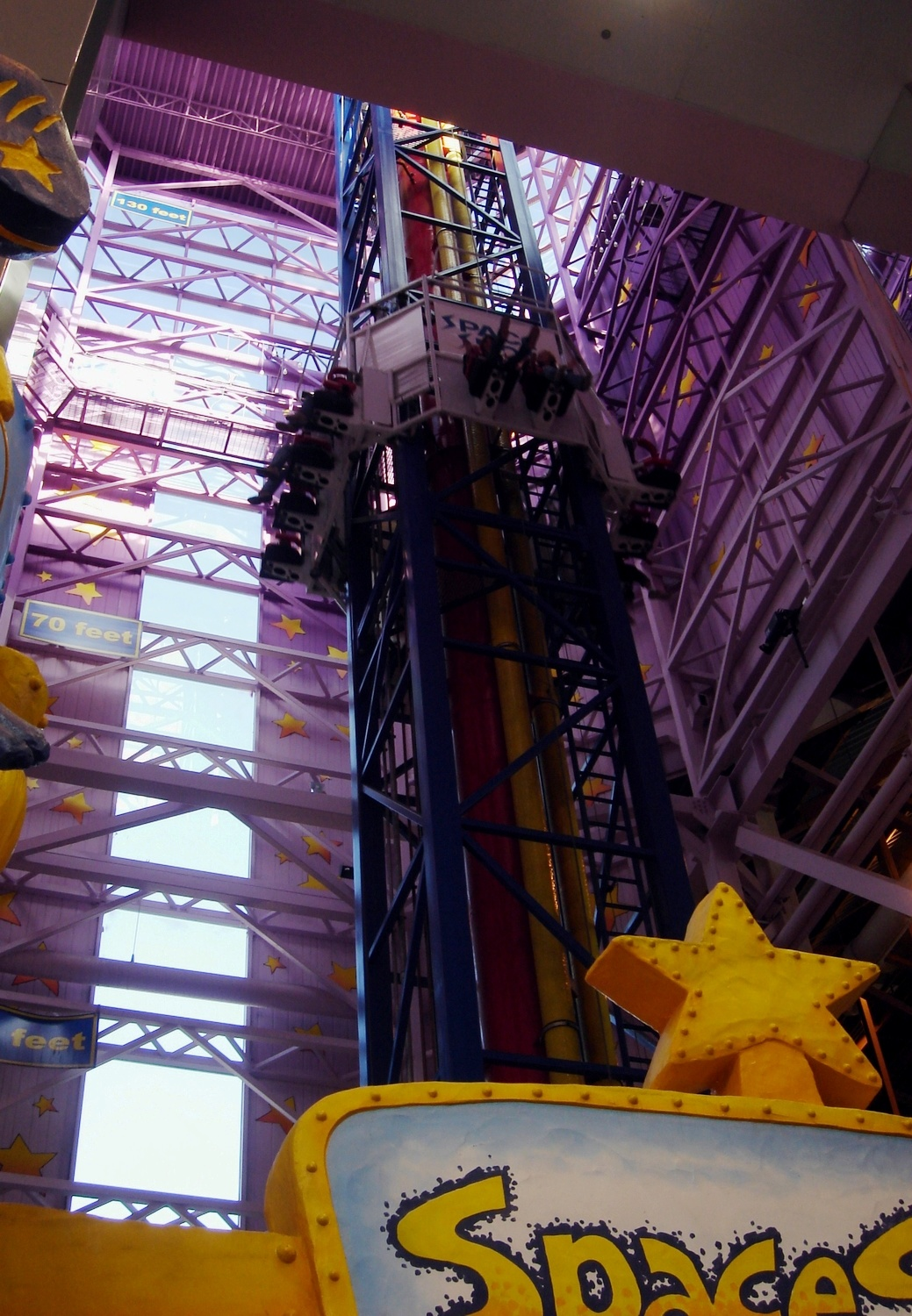
"Space Shot"

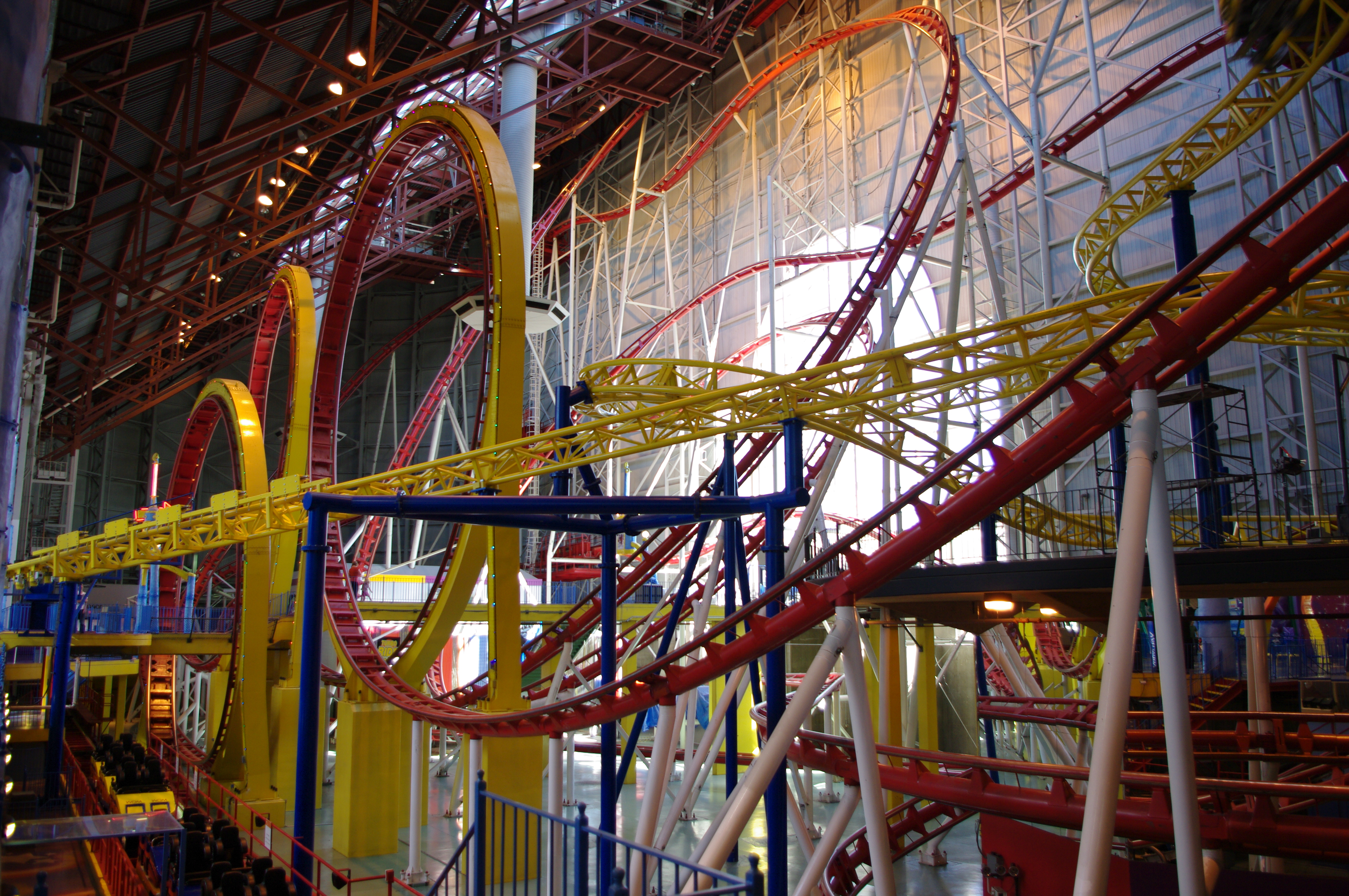
Mindbender and Galaxy Orbiter

| Ride | Year opened | Points required | Description | Park rating |
|---|---|---|---|---|
| Flight to Equestria | 1983 | 1 point | A Ferris wheel with cars shaped like balloons, themed after My Little Pony. Formerly known as the Balloon Race. | Beginner |
| Micro Machines Motojump | Unknown | 1 point | Miniature dirt bikes and ATVs that move in a circular forward motion. Its original location was where Cosmic Spinner is today, and was moved to the former Kiddie Karavan location, but moved again to the former Cosmo's Space Fountain in 2015 with the Solar Spinner (Dizzy Doh-Dohs), and then rethemed to Micro Machines during the ongoing Hasbro renovations. | Beginner |
| Monopoly Pass Go Carousel | 1983 | 1 point | Carousel with Monopoly themed vehicles that move in an up-and-down, circular motion. Formerly Carousel, opened July 1, 2025. | Beginner |
| Play-Doh Dizzy Doh-Dohs | 2015 | 1 point | A Play-Doh themed spinning teacup-inspired ride; riders spin inside pods while spinning on a disk Formerly known as the Solar Spinner. | Beginner |
| Micro Machines Aero Squadron | 1983 | 1 point° | World War II planes that move up and down (controlled by riders) in a forward circular motion, also themed to Micro Machines. Formerly known as the 35th Aero Squadron. | Beginner |
| Galactic Rodeo | 2018 | 1 point | Cowboys and Cowgirls wrangle intergalactic beasts in a space-themed arena. Signage from Galaxy Raceway can still be seen. | Beginner |
| Chutes & Ladders Climb & Slide Park | 1983 (under the Fantasyland theme) | 3 points (12 and under) | A large play area with slides and climbing functions. A socks-only environment where children must be accompanied by an adult. The new playpark opened on February 12, 2025, formerly known as Galaxy Kids Playpark. | Beginner |
| Monopoly Railroad | 1983 (under the Fantasyland theme) | 1 point | A train ride through Galaxyland. Although the ride's target group is small children, it is very popular among all ages because of the slow, leisurely pace and the fact that there are no height restrictions. A Kiddie Railway Manufactured by Ihle. Galaxy Express survived the park's extensive renovation period that saw most of the original rides removed, albeit the station and ride vehicles were extensively remodeled into a rocket theme. In 2022, it was rethemed to Hasbro's Monopoly. | Beginner |
| Barrel of Monkeys Bananza | 2002 | 2 points | This family ride takes 32 adventurers on a whirling orbit. On this Barrel of Monkeys themed version of the X-Arms ride, riders hop into one of 4 individually spinning monkeys to experience numerous thrills and jolts. This ride was placed in the former location of Motojump, which then moved to the former Kiddie Karavan location and Cosmo's Space Fountain with the Solar Spinner in 2015. Manufactured by Moser Rides. Formerly known as the Cosmic Spinner. | Intermediate |
| Rainbow Bounce | 1999 | 1 point | 10-seated family ride full of bounces. A 5 + 5 model spring ride by Moser Rides. Essentially a pint-sized and gentler version of the Space Shot that is run mainly by cables, winches, and hydraulics (as opposed to the air piston and cable system of the Space Shot). Formerly known as the Cosmic Bounce. | Beginner |
| Golden Galley | 1983 | 2 points | A Mr. Potato Head themed boat that swings back and forth. One of the park's original rides, and one of the few that was not remodeled into a space-age theme until it was rethemed into Hasbro in 2026. It moved to the former Sonic Twister location in 2015 and its old location was replaced by Zero Gravity. Formerly Flying Galleon, opened as Golden Galley on February 19, 2026. | Intermediate |
| Cootie Coaster | 1985 | 2 points | A small roller coaster with a series of sharp turns and high speeds. Ideal for those who are too big for the Dragon Wagon, but not quite ready to try out the Galaxy Orbiter. Formerly known as "Autosled". | Intermediate |
| Quirks in the Works | 2003 | 2 points | A crashed spaceship has been taken over by Quirks and the rider has to save the world by zapping as many quirks as possible in the dark. The ride's site was formerly occupied by the second part of the Drop of Doom. | Intermediate |
| G.I. Joe Ninja Training | 2014 | 2 points | A zipline area with many ropes. Formerly located near the World Waterpark viewing area, replaced the old Sonic Twister location, and this made the closure of Solar Flare (Sonic Twister was replaced by Flying Galleon later). Formerly called Ropes Quest. | Intermediate |
| Galaxy Orbiter | 2007 | 3 points | Canada's first spinning roller coaster. Installed in 2007, Galaxy Orbiter is the park's longest roller coaster and is a good step up for those who have outgrown the Cootie Coaster. Construction of the ride forced the permanent removal of Rockin' Rocket and the UFO Maze as well as the temporary closure of Cootie Coaster and Galaxy Raceway. The ride was installed by Ride Entertainment Group, who handles all of Gerstlauer's operations in the Western Hemisphere. | Advanced |
| Space Shot | 2002 | 3 points | 12 person ride launches passengers nearly 120 feet (37 m) skyward then thrusts them back to earth. Although the ride is called "Space Shot" (and features the usual S&S Space Shot signage on the ride vehicle), it operates in the same style as (and may have been converted to) a Double Shot. | Advanced |
| Trouble Twist | 2016 | 3 points | Opened on December 3, 2016, in the Flying Galleon's old location (now moved to the old location of the Carousel), this ride allows riders to control how much and which way they want to flip (Using the lever) as they rotate in a circular motion with up and down movements. Riders can also stop in place by keeping the lever neutral. A UniCoaster by Chance Rides. Due to the Hasbro retheming and renovations, this ride has now been themed to the board game Trouble. Formerly known as Zero Gravity. | Advanced |
| Monopoly Flight of Fortune | 1983 | 2 points | A Monopoly (game) themed giant swing set with individual swings that move in a circular, swinging motion. A Wave Swinger manufactured by Zierer. It was rethemed into Hasbro in 2026. Formerly Swing of the Century. | Intermediate |
| Hungry Hungry Hippos: Feeding Frenzy | 1983 (under the Fantasyland theme) | 3 points | 2-seated bumper cars built for adults, teenagers, and larger kids. One of the original attractions, the enclosure area in which the car bang and bash were extensively remodeled during Galaxyland's renovation period, with the mirrors surrounding the enclosure wall replaced by space-themed murals. Themed to Hungry Hungry Hippos during the current Hasbro overhaul, formerly known as Cosmo's Space Derby, and the Misguided Motorcars. | Advanced |
| Sorry! Sliders Bumper Cars | 2022 | 1 point | Children's bumper cars that drive and collide with each other. Themed to the game of Sorry! Sliders. Space was formerly the Galaxyland location of the New Play arcade, however other arcades and machines exist elsewhere in Galaxyland and New Play still has a location in the Phase III food court (originally Circuit Circus). | Beginner |
| Untitled Nerf Coaster | Spring 2027 | TBA (Most likely 3 points) | Untitled roller coaster manufactured by Vekoma and themed to Nerf that will be the replacement for the Mindbender. Tracks and parts arrived in Edmonton in late October 2025 and construction began in December 2025, with coaster track arriving at the park in May/June 2026. A naming contest will be held in late 2026. | TBA (Most likely Advanced) |

=== Decommissioned rides ===
| Ride | Year opened | Year closed | Tickets required | Description | Park rating |
|---|---|---|---|---|---|
| Havoc | 2018 | 2026 | 3 | Opened in April 2018 and themed to G.I. Joe, this ride was a custom version of the Space Trainer by Moser, scaled down to fit within one of Cootie Coaster's helix sections. Havoc replaced the Cosmic Revolution, which was removed in 2017. It used to be the park’s only ride with an upper age limit, as riders must be under the age of 65. | Advanced |
| Kiddie Bumper Boat | 1983 | 1988 | 1 ticket | Battery-operated boats in a shallow pool for children to drive around, unknown manufacturer, closed 1988, Located on a former pond where the birthday rooms are now (beside the train station). The pond itself was removed after a collapse occurred in the movie theatres below. | Beginner |
| Iwerks Turbo Ride Theatre | 1995 | 2013 | Unknown | A movie theater with hydraulically controlled seats, six-channel surround sound, and a 3-story IMAX screen. The theater sat in a large cement cube within the former Mindbender's enclosure. It was converted to a 3D theatre later in its life, before being repurposed as Galaxy Quest. | Intermediate |
| Galaxy Quest | 2013 | 2020/2023 | 2 points | A 3D movie theater with full motion seats, DTS sound, and a 3-story screen. The theater sat in the former location of the Turbo Ride Theatre. It closed during the pandemic and never reopened. The theatre enclosure was demolished during the removal of the Mindbender. | Intermediate |
| Kiddie Karavan | 1985 | Early 2000s | 2 tickets | Miniature Carousel for small children with no horses. Riders would ride in either 1 of 2 fish, a deer, a duck, or a carriage. Originally known as a mini-wave swinger, the characters the children were seated on were secured together, and the speed of the ride slowed so that seats did not swing outwards. It closed in the early 2000s and Motojump moved where Kiddie Karavan was, Cosmic Spinner moved into Motojump's former location. Motojump moved again in 2015 to the former location of Cosmo's Space Fountain with the Solar Spinner (Play-Doh Dizzy Doh-Dohs). | |
| Paddle Boats | Unknown | Unknown | 3 tickets | Paddle boats for larger children and adults originally borrowed Pelican brand boats from Hawrelak Park, later Sun Dolphin brand boats. Galaxyland Raceway is located in its former location. The "islands" of the lake and staining from water exposure are still visible, especially on the "island" that supports the Dragon Wagon. Additionally, the exit/entrance stairs from the ride are also visible beneath the base of the Cosmic Spinner and are best seen from riding the Galaxyland Express. | |
| Mini-Enterprise | Unknown | Unknown | 2 tickets | Known also as a Mini-Enterprise, it was a scaled-down version, with six cars of similar proportions to its larger namesake. The ride moved in a circular motion and tilted up to approximately 30 degrees while rotating, but the revolutions per minute did not allow the cars to swing outward like a full-size Enterprise ride, they merely hung. Located between the former Mindbender control booth and the balloon race ride. | |
| Zipper | 1980s? | 1990s? | 5 tickets | The Zipper was located near the operating booth of the former Mindbender where the entrance to the "Haunted Castle" now resides. It was removed due to numerous breakdowns in one spot. The mechanics could stop the constant breakdowns by modifying the ride to run differently but it would not be as much fun to ride. Also, constant breakdowns were because the Zipper in Galaxyland was the only park model zipper known. It ran all year round in the end putting excessive wear on the ride and causing constant breakdowns. Manufactured by Chance Amusements. | |
| Orbitron | 1985 | 1995 | 4 tickets | A ride with a center that rises about 12 feet, and cranks arms at the ends of the sweeps. Each crank arm has two tubs on it, and as the center rotates, the crank arms rotate to bounce the tubs up and down. Manufactured by Zierer and known as a Hexentanz or Fireball. Upon the Orbitron's removal, the cement pad underneath it supported the "UFO Maze". This maze stood for a number of years before it was removed due to the construction of the Galaxy Orbiter. The pad currently supports a "finale" section of the Galaxy Orbiter. Despite its removal, the ride's operating booth (complete with a height-restriction notice) that also stood there was eventually removed due to the Mindbender removal, But the queue lines can still be seen, and are best viewed when riding the Galaxy Orbiter. Although the red, yellow and white tile theme can also be seen today when exiting Galaxyland from entrance 12. | |
| Disco Dynamo | 1985 | Likely 2002- 2003 | 5 tickets | Spinning ride, capable of rotating forward and backward on an undulating path in a circle. Generally, the ride only ran backward but was capable of forward motion. Manufactured by Mack Rides as a park model of their "Disco Star" or "Super Disco Star" The Sonic Storm (formerly Cosmic Revolution, now Havoc) is located in this ride's former location. Ride sold and operated indoors as the Disco Star, at Fun Zone in New York State. After bankruptcy sale at auction in New York, now operates at Sindbad Wonderland - Gulshan, India. | |
| Perilous Pendulum | 1985 | 2004 | 5 tickets | Upside-down boat. Manufactured by Intamin as Looping Starship. The Solar Flare (replaced by Sonic Twister's new location, now Flying Galleon) is located in this ride's former location. The ride was the world's first indoor Looping Starship. The main riding area (the boat) was located in the parking lot just north of Galaxyland's entrance 10 wrapped in tarps until its removal in 2004. | |
| Drop of Doom | 1985 | 2001 | 5 tickets | A first-generation free-fall tower ride. Manufactured by Intamin. Riders were transported up a high gantry in a cage similar to an elevator car before being dropped down 120 feet (37 m) into an exiting area. Despite the arguable fact that it was the park's second greatest attraction (behind the former Mindbender), it was removed in 2002. The tall, cylindrical space where the gantry stood is currently occupied by the "Space Shot" tower ride (albeit it operates similarly to a Double Shot). The entrance/exit area sat unoccupied for a short time before housing Quirks in the Works, an interactive laser ride. Despite many first-generation freefall rides having been scrapped, the Drop of Doom was re-assembled, painted a dark red/burgundy color, and opened in 2006 as the Hollywood Tower in Movie Land Park, Italy. | |
| Rockin' Rocket | 2003 | 2006 | 4 tickets | A rocket-shaped vehicle would move back and forth on a curved metal base while spinning. A rocket version of the Zamperla Rockin' Tug ride. The Galaxy Orbiter's loading and unloading station is located in its former location. The rocket itself sat outside of Galaxyland wrapped in tarps, until its removal. | |
| Sonic Storm | 2003 | 2010 | 6 tickets | A ride where 32 passengers were propelled backward in a circular bouncing motion. A Techno Jump manufactured by Sartori. This ride is in the former location of the Disco Dynamo. The ride was replaced by the Cosmic Revolution in March 2011. It was removed in January 2010. | |
| Autocars | Unknown | Unknown | 2 tickets | Small-themed antique cars on an L-shaped circular track for younger children. Formerly located opposite the Cootie Coaster, later replaced by the Laser Maze and a coin-operated remote control car attraction. | |
| Sky Diver | 1985 | Unknown | 3 tickets | A tall parachute-style drop ride for children, Originally located on the site of the SR2 ride, which was later replaced by the kiddie dragon coaster. Suffered low ridership due to the height (children were taken to the ceiling before being dropped), which frightened many. Also difficult to load/unload children without adult assistance. | |
| SR2 Motion Simulator | Unknown | Unknown | Cash ride, later 4 tickets | Originally a leased ride, not covered by the Fantasyland ticket system. Replaced the Kiddie Parachute Drop. A motion simulator ride with a 16 mm film projector simulating various other amusement rides, such as "The Beast" roller coaster at Kings Island. Initially problematic due to insufficient cooling of hydraulics, failure of the film mechanism, and the subject of numerous customer complaints due to not accepting ride coupons. Later replaced by the Kiddie Dragon coaster. Manufactured by Doron. | |
| Astro Base Alpha | 1985 | Unknown | 4 tickets | A motion ride with arcade features. Located originally in the footprint of the former Mindbender Rollercoaster in a dome structure. The ride was enclosed in the dark and used a modified Tilt-a-Whirl platform, with riders seated in molded chairs, each with a "laser gun". As the ride undulated and spun, the riders were to shoot at light-sensitive targets located in the upper dome, and scores were recorded on the internal computer system. Delayed in opening due to the Mindbender accident, it ran for only a couple of years. Completely demolished and replaced by the now-former theatre within the former Mindbender footprint. Manufactured by Sellner. | |
| Space Probe | 1985 | Unknown | 3 tickets | Rides were seated in a sphere which was in turn located in a formed clear plastic tube. The ride consisted of 3 powered fans lifting the sphere within the tube, and "bouncing" the sphere multiple times. Thrill derived from the feeling the sphere would be propelled from the open end of the tube, though this was physically impossible due to the loss of air pressure once the sphere reached the top. The original concept called for several units which would have "battles" between them with shooting and lasers, but only one was ever purchased and modified to bounce riders. Originally located behind the former Mindbender operator's booth, later relocated closer to the Orbitron Ride Entrance. Eventually scrapped due to low ridership, and repeated mechanical failures. Manufactured by Saker One Corp. | |
| Harbour Cruisers | 1985 | Unknown | 2 tickets | A boat ride located in the lake formerly located where the Galaxyland Raceway and the Spinning Coaster are now located. Consisted of 12 barge-looking boats with canopies, four seats each. Every boat was affixed to a square nylon cord which was pulled through the bottom of the lake on a submerged track structure. Never a popular ride due to the lack of theming and scenery on the lake, the ride was constantly breaking due to the high friction force on the nylon cord which caused it to snap often, stranding riders. Lake also did not have a filtration system and resulting in algae blooms and constant draining and cleaning. Replaced on an interim basis by paddle boats, until the lake was finally drained and discontinued. Boats were sold in the local "bargain finder" paper. | |
| Laser Maze | Unknown | Unknown | Cash ride, later 3 tickets | A walk-through dark ride, designed by Disney Imagineer Rolly Crump, replacing the Autocars. As players walked through the maze, robots, targets, and the like were illuminated, and the object was to shoot the targets at them. Each player was issued a rifle-looking gun that sent out a light beam to record a hit on the targets. Scores were recorded on an IBM XT computer and displayed on screens around the attraction. Originally located in a leased retail bay of the mall, later relocated to within Fantasyland, and operated as a separate entity that did not take ride tickets. Later, due to numerous complaints, ride tickets were eventually accepted. | |
| Haunted Dark Ride | Unknown | Unknown | Never completed - likely 4 | A haunted dark ride was scheduled to be built in an area located where the operations office and wall games are in phase two. Never completed due to schedule issues during the opening of phase two of the amusement park, the cars and equipment were ordered, and sat in the basement of Phase three of the mall until 1989 when they were sold. The ride would have operated on two levels, on a spiral oval track, and went into its own basement, before re-emerging on the main floor. The basement was hastily converted to a warehouse for games inventory, and today the only sign of its existence is a change in concrete floor texture over the basement, near the office. | |
| Galaxy Twister | 1995 | 2009 | 6 tickets | A fast-speed 36-seated ride that moves and twists forward and backward with sharp drops and flipping motions. A Crazy Flip (Super Loop on Top) manufactured by Soriani & Moser. Opened in 1995, and removed in 2009 to make way for Sonic Twister. However, since Sonic Twister moved to the former Solar Flare ride, Ropes Quest is currently located in the former location. It closed in 2015 to make way for Flying Galleon (Golden Galley). | |
| Solar Flare | 2004 | 2014 | 6 tickets | A thrill ride where riders experience an intense ground rush as they circle the blazing sun, flipping, and spinning in all directions as they flip forward and backward. This ride is in the former location of the Perilous Pendulum. A Hoppla manufactured by Moser. Closed in March 2014. Solar Flare was closed due to a lack of riders. Also, Sonic Twister moved to where Solar Flare was. Sonic Twister's old location was replaced by Ropes Quest. | |
| Sonic Twister | 2009 | 2015 | 6 tickets | A Sidewinder 12 model from Moser Rides. Spins in circles as it swings back and forth up to a 120-degree angle on each side. Ropes Quest was located in its former location and was located in the former Solar Flare ride. Removed in 2015 for the new location of Flying Galleon (Golden Galley). | |
| Cosmic Revolution | 2011 | 2017 | 2 points | 12 two-passenger cars are connected on an undulating circular track with bumps. The cars travel back and forth at high speeds, the speed often determined by the music and DJ operator, who interacts with riders throughout their experience on the ride. The height requirement is 48 inches. This ride was removed from Galaxyland on April 24, 2017. Havoc replaced this ride in the summer of 2018. | |
| Galaxy Raceway | Unknown | 2018 | 1 point | Slow-moving electric go-karts driven through an "Indy" style racetrack. Removed and replaced with Galactic Rodeo in 2017–2018. However, former signage for Galaxy Raceway can still be seen in Galactic Rodeo. | Beginner |
| Space Bump | 1985 (under the Fantasyland theme) | 2018 | 1 point | Children's cars that drive and collide with each other. Before it was called Space Bump, it was called Kiddie Bumper Cars. Removed to make way for more arcade machine space. | Beginner |
| Mindbender | 1985 | 2023 | 3 points | The "world's largest indoor triple loop roller coaster." A mirror image and modified "Dreier Looping" designed by Anton Schwarzkopf. Removed to make way for a new family thrill attraction. | Advanced |

== See also ==
- World Waterpark
