= Mindbender (Galaxyland) =

Defunct roller coaster in Galaxyland Mall, Alberta, Canada

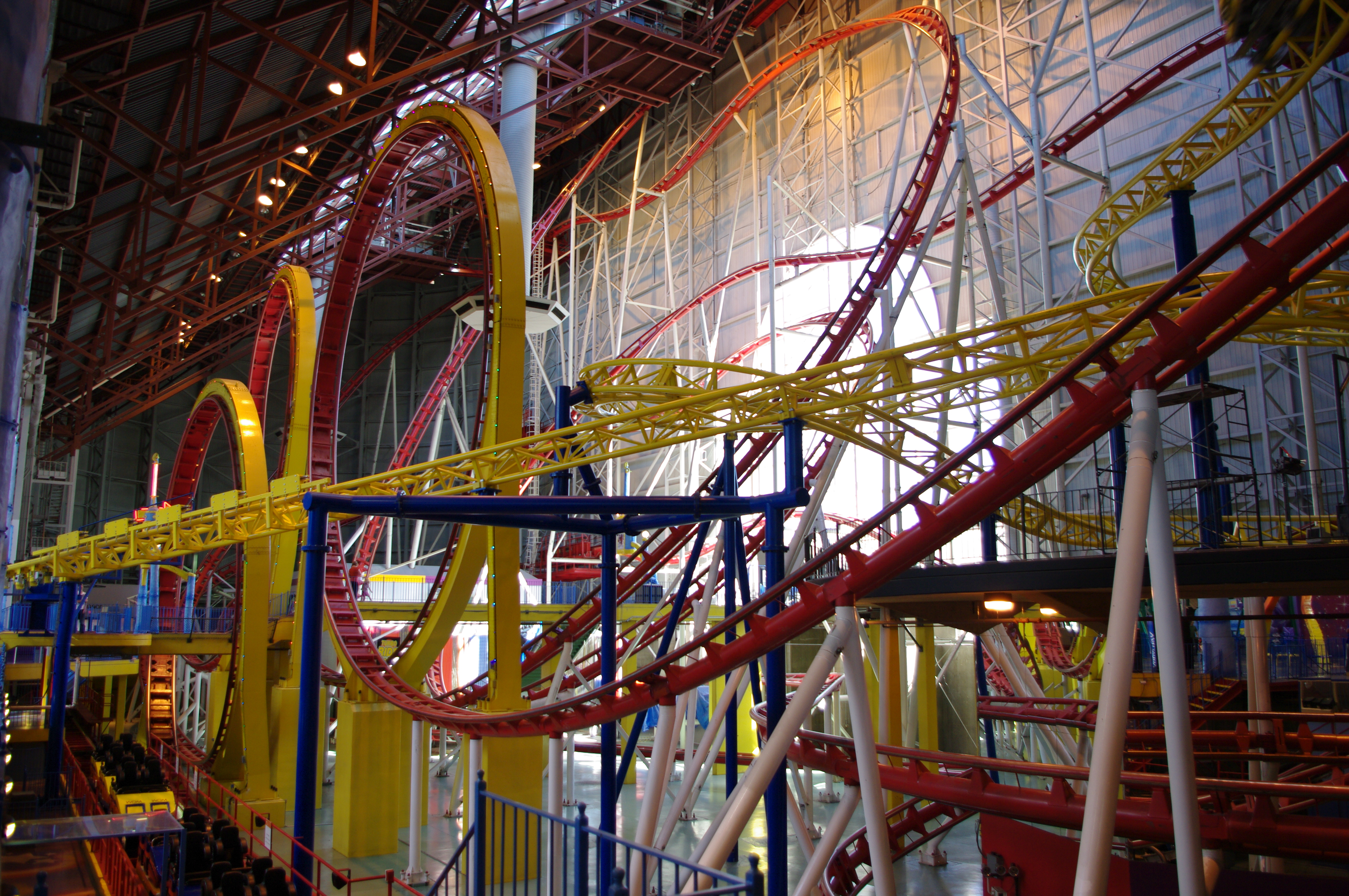
- The Mindbender with the Galaxy Orbiter roller coaster in the foreground

Galaxyland
- Location: Galaxyland
- Coordinates: 53°31′25″N 113°37′13″W
- Status: Removed
- Opening date: December 20, 1985
- Closing date: January 30, 2023
- Cost: $6,000,000

General statistics
- Type: Steel – Twister – Indoor
- Manufacturer: Anton Schwarzkopf
- Designer: Werner Stengel
- Model: Sitting Coaster
- Track layout: Indoor Twister
- Lift/launch system: Tire propelled lift hill
- Height: 44.2 m (145 ft)
- Drop: 38.7 m (127 ft)
- Length: 1,279.5 m (4,198 ft)
- Speed: 96.5 km/h (60.0 mph)
- Inversions: 3
- Duration: 1:13
- Capacity: 430 riders per hour
- G-force: 5.6
- Height restriction: 59–77 in (150–196 cm)
- Trains: 4 trains with 3 cars. Riders are arranged 2 across in 2 rows for a total of 12 riders per train.
- Website: Official website
- Mindbender at RCDB

The Mindbender was an Anton Schwarzkopf looping roller coaster at Galaxyland, a theme park in West Edmonton Mall, in Alberta, Canada. The ride officially opened to the public on December 20, 1985 at a cost of $6 million. At 44.2 m (145 ft) in height, it was the tallest indoor roller coaster in the world as of 2020.

On January 30, 2023, the mall decommissioned and closed the Mindbender after 37 years of service, in order to redevelop its space for new developments in the park. Its trains were reused for All American Triple Loop, at Indiana Beach, United States.

== Layout ==
Mindbender was designed by Germany's Werner Stengel and built by Anton Schwarzkopf. It was inspired by this team's previous design, Dreier Looping, a portable coaster that travelled the German funfair circuit, before being sold to a succession of amusement parks in Malaysia, Great Britain, Mexico, and most recently, Indiana Beach, United States. Mindbender was a pseudo mirror-image of Dreier Looping, and was slightly taller, with additional helices at the end of the ride. Mindbender featured shorter trains, with three pilot cars, whereas Dreier Looping usually ran with five trailer cars and one pilot car, occasionally rising to seven-car trains at busy funfairs.

The ride's layout featured many twisting drops, three vertical loops and a double upward helix finale. The ride twisted underneath, in between and around its supports. It also went underneath the former UFO Maze attraction, which was removed to make way for a space-themed food court that never came to be. Often in high season, the last car on one of the trains was reversed, allowing guests to ride the roller coaster without being able to see where they were going.

== Ride experience ==
After boarding the Mindbender, riders put on their seatbelt and lap restraints. The ride operator would then lower large shoulder restraints over the riders. All of the restraints kept the riders firmly secured in the seat.

After ascending the curving wheel-driven lift hill, the train descended a sharp, twisting left-hand drop (sometimes referred to as a Traver drop) that climbed back up to the first of four stacked block brakes. The train negotiated a second left-hand drop that was immediately followed by the first two vertical loops. Then the train repeated the aforementioned process: it went up to the third block brake, then did another twisting drop and ascent before hitting the fourth block brake. After the fourth block brake, the track dropped to the left and back down to ground level, and hit the third vertical loop.

Following the third loop, the coaster train did another cycle under the stacked block brakes, then shot along a two-layered upward helix, before running behind the Galaxy Quest 7D theatre to hit the final brake run and the exit/entry area.

The ride length from the initial drop normally ranged from one minute, five seconds, to one minute, twenty-five seconds. Circuit times as little as 59 seconds were possible through extensive waxing of the track, and reduction in tension on the bogey wheels. This increase in speed was not permitted during public rides, as the forces on the riders became severe. During testing of the renovated trains in 1987, the maximum g-force of a normal run was measured on equipment bolted into the train at 5.5 g, which occurred in the third loop.

== Accident ==
Mindbender accident
- Date: June 14, 1986
- Type: Rollercoaster derailment
- Deaths: 3
- Injuries: 1 critical; 19 treated
- Property damage: Faulty wheel assembly; rear roller coaster car that slammed into a pillar

On the evening of June 14, 1986, the fourth car of a train travelling midway along the course derailed before encountering the third and final loop. Its wheel assembly had become detached from both the track and car itself, causing the car to sway back and forth across the tracks. The car became damaged, and the lap bar restraints unlocked and released, throwing all four of its passengers to the concrete floor below. The train continued to move along the track and into the final loop, but friction from the car's derailment slowed the train and prevented it from clearing the loop. As it rolled backward down the loop, the detached car crashed into a concrete pillar about midway down, stopping the train abruptly. Three of the four passengers thrown from the ride died, while the fourth was left critically injured with permanent, life-altering effects. The remaining passengers were safely evacuated and treated at a nearby hospital with minor injuries. An investigation later determined that four cap screws holding the wheel assembly together failed, which were likely the result of design flaws and unsatisfactory maintenance routines.

When Mindbender reopened in January 1987, the trains were redesigned. The existing four-car trains were converted to three-car trains (reducing seating capacity from 16 to 12), and anti-roll-back features were installed. Each train previously consisted of two wheel assemblies per car; however, after this accident, two further wheel assemblies were added to each car. The lap bar restraint was retained, but seat belts and shoulder headrests were added.

== Decommission and removal ==
Before the Mindbender's closure in early 2023, it was frequently closed for maintenance starting in 2020. The last time it was operating normally was a few-month stint in 2021 starting in July with the reopening of Galaxyland.

On January 30, 2023, the Mindbender was decommissioned and closed after 37 years of service. Removal was complete by February 2025. The trains were reused for All American Triple Loop at Indiana Beach, United States. It will be replaced by a new roller-coaster.

== Awards ==
Golden Ticket Awards: Top Steel Roller Coasters
Year									1998	1999
Ranking									13	17
Year	2000	2001	2002	2003	2004	2005	2006	2007	2008	2009
Ranking	22	17	30	37	45	40	44	48	43 (tie)	48
Year	2010	2011	2012	2013	2014	2015	2016	2017	2018	2019
Ranking	48 (tie)	–	–	–	–	–	–	–	–	–
Year	2020	2021	2022	2023	2024	2025				
Ranking	N/A	–	–	–	–	–				

== See also ==
- Galaxy Orbiter
