= Cornball Express =

Roller coaster in Monticello, Indiana, US

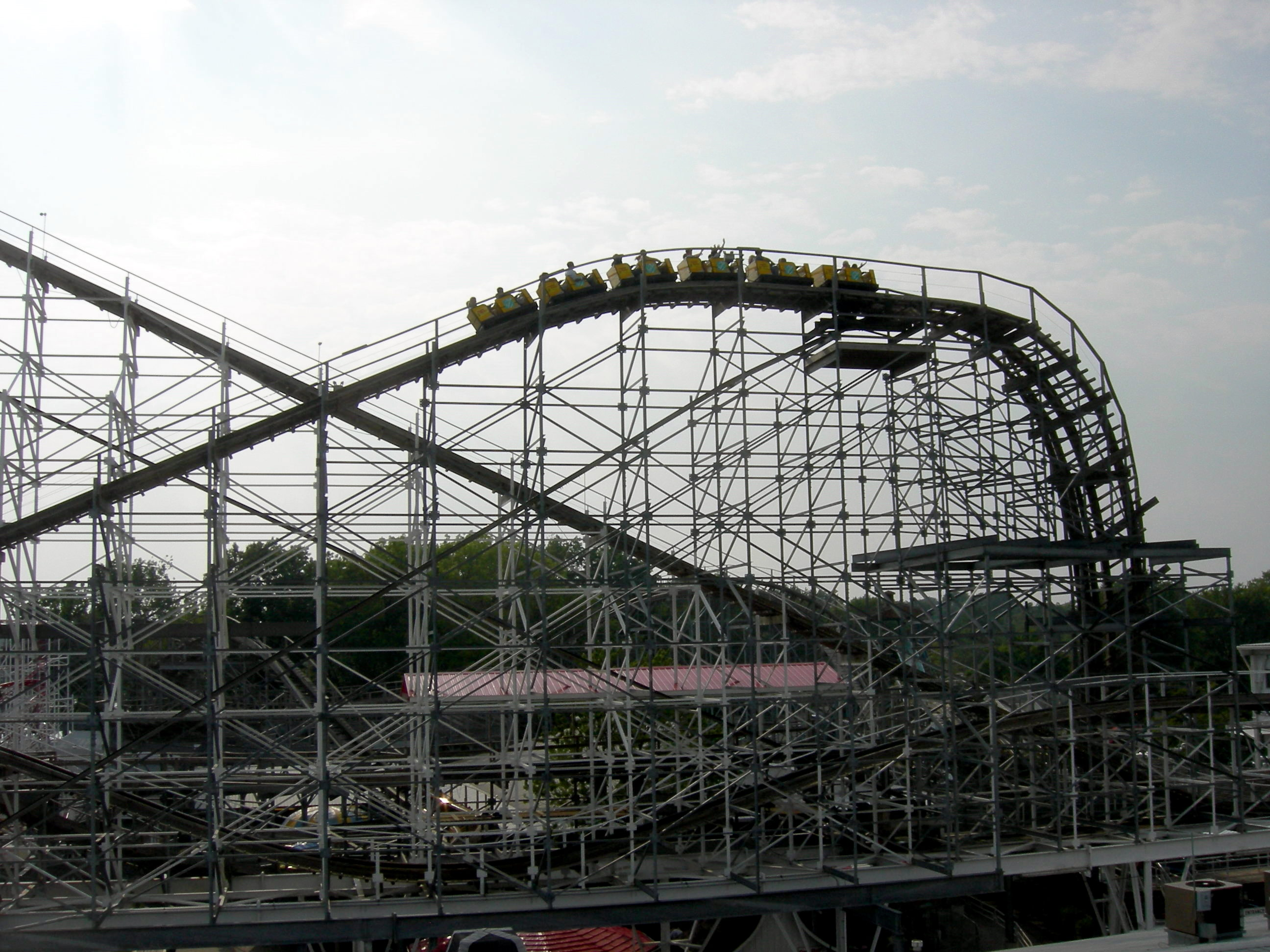
- Cornball Express reaching the top of its lift hill.

Indiana Beach
- Location: Indiana Beach
- Coordinates: 40.789791°N 86.770992°W
- Status: Operating
- Opening date: May 18, 2001

General statistics
- Type: Wood
- Manufacturer: Custom Coasters International
- Track layout: Wood
- Lift/launch system: Chain
- Height: 55 ft (17 m)
- Drop: 50 ft (15 m)
- Length: 2,100 ft (640 m)
- Speed: 45 mph (72 km/h)
- Inversions: 0
- Duration: 0:51
- Height restriction: 46 in (117 cm)
- Trains: Single train with 6 cars; riders arranged 2 across in 2 rows for a total of 24 riders per train
- Cornball Express at RCDB

Cornball Express is a wooden roller coaster at Indiana Beach amusement park in Monticello, Indiana, United States. The ride was designed and manufactured by Custom Coasters International. It opened on May 18, 2001. The Cornball Express had gained critical acclaim among enthusiasts, being named the #1 wooden roller coaster in the world by website ThemeParkCritic.com in 2002. Cornball Express, along with 2002's Lost Coaster of Superstition Mountain, were among Custom Coaster International's last roller coasters designed before closing their doors in 2002. It was their 48th roller coaster designed.

Cornball Express, as with other rides at the park, is also notable for being 'shoehorned' into other rides at the park. The ride weaves through and uses portions of the Hoosier Hurricane's structure in some parts, glides over the Kiddieland section of the park, wraps around the park's Tig'rr Coaster, and may sometimes 'duel' with the Rocky's Rapids Log Flume attraction.

The name Cornball Express was also a candidate to be the name for the Hoosier Hurricane while it was being designed, however the name was tossed in favor for the latter.

== Layout ==
The Cornball Express starts off with boarding the trains (designed by Philadelphia Toboggan Coasters) and pulling down the "buzz bar" restraint before dispatch. The train then crawls out the station and starts the trek up the 55-foot-tall (17 m) lift hill.

As soon as the train crests the chain lift hill, it nears the first drop, a twisted drop then rockets the train to speeds of 45 miles per hour. After the drop, the ride soars over the Hoosier Hurricane and into a turnaround the then heads towards an airtime hill. After that, the ride then circles the Tig'rr Coaster's area into more airtime hills. After a third airtime hill that soars over the lake, the fourth hill takes riders into the Hoosier Hurricane's structure and mimics the "S-bend" turn of the Hurricane. The ride then soars over the Kiddieland section and goes into a helix. Following the helix, riders are treated to two more bunny hills of airtime before turning into the brake run, ending a ride on the Cornball Express.

== Awards ==
Golden Ticket Awards: Top wood Roller Coasters
| Year | | | | | | | | | 1998 | 1999 |
|---|---|---|---|---|---|---|---|---|---|---|
| Ranking | | | | | | | | | – | – |
| Year | 2000 | 2001 | 2002 | 2003 | 2004 | 2005 | 2006 | 2007 | 2008 | 2009 |
| Ranking | – | – | 18 | 13 | 17 | 18 | 18 | 24 | 25 | 24 |
| Year | 2010 | 2011 | 2012 | 2013 | 2014 | 2015 | 2016 | 2017 | 2018 | 2019 |
| Ranking | 29 | 24 | 39 (tie) | 32 | – | – | – | – | – | – |
| Year | 2020 | 2021 | 2022 | 2023 | 2024 | 2025 | 2026 | | | |
| Ranking | N/A | 41 | 44 | 42 (tie) | 40 | 41 | 44 | | | |

- Note: From 2014 to 2019 Cornball Express did not chart in the Golden Ticket Awards.
