= All American Triple Loop =

Steel roller coaster

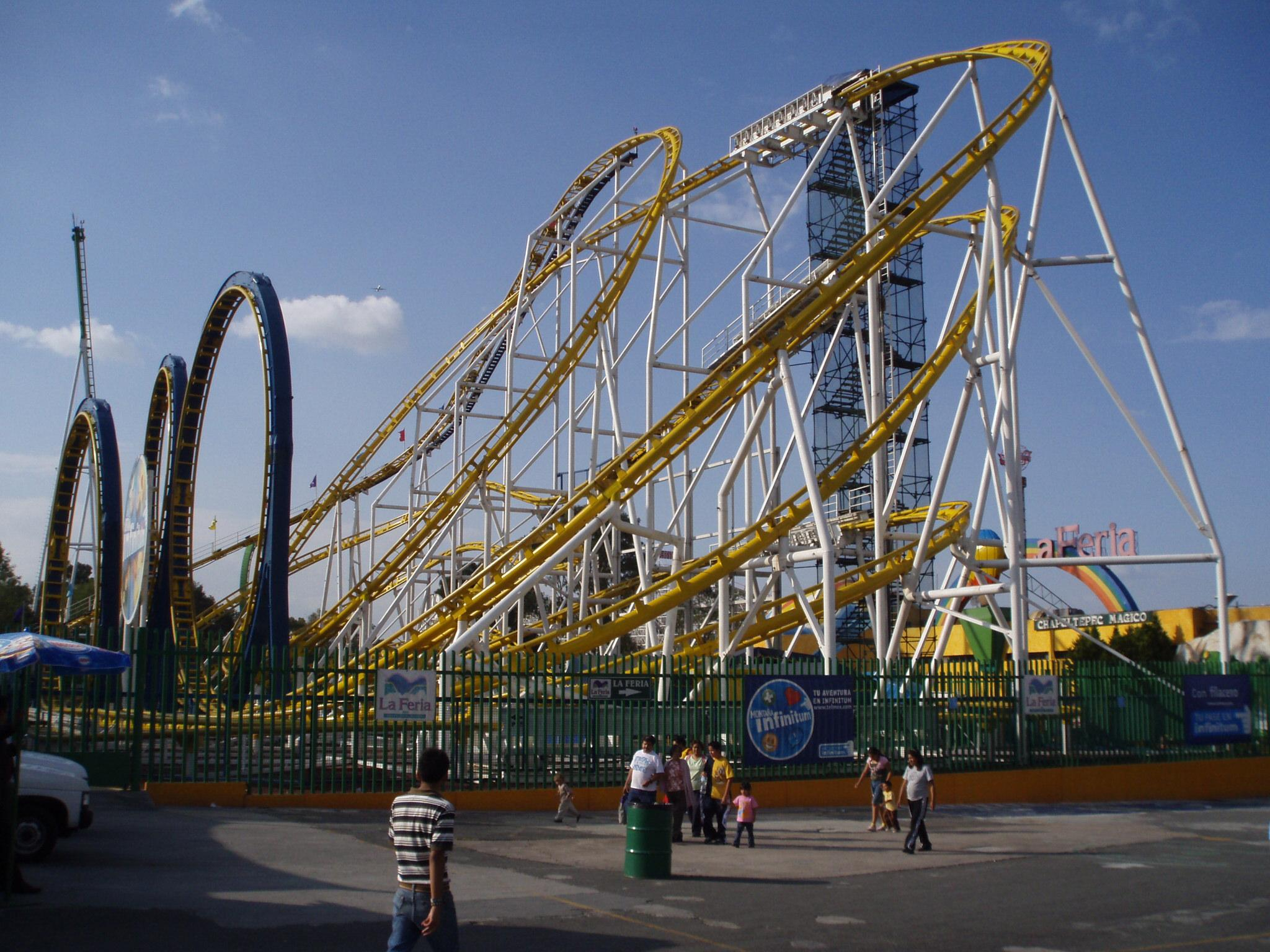
- All American Triple Loop in August 2007 when it was formerly located at La Feria de Chapultepec and also was named Montaña Infinitum.

Indiana Beach
- Coordinates: 40°47′29″N 86°46′22″W
- Status: Operating
- Opening date: May 11, 2024

La Feria Chapultepec Mágico
- Name: Quimera
- Coordinates: 19.414°N 99.196°W
- Status: Removed
- Opening date: 2007
- Closing date: September 28, 2019
- Quimera at La Feria Chapultepec Mágico at RCDB

Flamingo Land
- Name: Magnum Force
- Coordinates: 54.210°N 0.806°W
- Status: Removed
- Opening date: 2000
- Closing date: 2005
- Magnum Force at Flamingo Land at RCDB

Sunway Lagoon
- Name: Triple Loop Coaster
- Coordinates: 3.069°N 101.606°E
- Status: Removed
- Opening date: 1997
- Closing date: 1999
- Triple Loop Coaster at Sunway Lagoon at RCDB

General statistics
- Type: Steel
- Manufacturer: Anton Schwarzkopf
- Designer: Werner Stengel
- Lift/launch system: Booster Wheel Lift Hill
- Height: 111 ft (34 m)
- Length: 3,444 ft (1,050 m)
- Speed: 53 mph (85 km/h)
- Inversions: 3
- Capacity: 1,500 riders per hour
- G-force: 6.1
- Height restriction: 59–77 in (150–196 cm)
- Trains: 3 trains with 5 cars; riders arranged 2 across in 2 rows for a total of 20 riders per train
- All American Triple Loop at RCDB

All American Triple Loop (formerly Montaña Infinitum ["Infinity Mountain"] (2007–2014), Montaña Triple Loop ["Triple Loop Mountain"] (2014–2016) and Quimera ["Chimera"] (2017–2019)) is a steel roller coaster at Indiana Beach theme park in Monticello, Indiana.

Manufactured by Anton Schwarzkopf, it was originally purchased by showman Rudolf Barth in 1984 who operated it as Dreier Looping for 12 years on the German fair circuit.

After this, it was the main attraction in three major theme parks: first spending 2 years in Sunway Lagoon as Triple Loop Coaster, next, it spent 5 years in Flamingo Land resort as Magnum Force, and finally at its third and most recent location at La Feria Chapultepec Mágico, as Montaña Triple Loop. In 2017 it was renamed Quimera. In 2024, it opened at Indiana Beach as All American Triple Loop.

== Accident ==
On September 28, 2019, the derailment of the last car at an approximate height of 33 ft (10 m) resulted in two deaths and another five persons being injured. The entire park was shut down following the accident.

== History ==
The coaster first operated as Dreier Looping in 1984. Dreier Looping was one of many massive Schwarzkopf traveling coasters to make its debut during this period of time, alongside units including the famed Alpina Bahn, Olympia Looping, Doppel Looping, and Thriller traveling coasters. Dreier Looping, which is German for "Triple Loop", also became the first roller coaster to feature three vertical loops. It was purchased by showman Rudolf Barth, and operated on the German fair circuit for 12 years. Dreier Looping made its last fairground stop in 1996.

The coaster was then purchased by the recently opened Sunway Lagoon in Malaysia, where it operated as Triple Loop Coaster; a complete English translation of the German name "Dreier Looping". It was also outfitted with a pink and white colour scheme. Despite its renovations to fit in at the park, it was placed for sale during the 1999 season and promptly removed.

Its next stop would be at the Flamingo Land park in North Yorkshire, England. They had bought the coaster in June 1999, and was rechristened as the Magnum Force. It adopted a white and red paint scheme, although much of the ride's taller portions were painted completely white, presumably to blend in with the skyline a little more. It was put up for sale in 2005 alongside Bullet, another Schwarzkopf looping coaster in the park, and both were promptly removed after the 2005 season. They were replaced by Kumali, which debuted the next year and primarily utilizes Bullet's site. As of 2020, the Magnum Force plot of land has remained empty.

Magnum Force would then be sold to La Feria Chapultepec Mágico in Mexico City, Mexico. In order to accommodate it, the park's existing Ratón Loco had to be relocated to the park's lower level. It was outfitted with a brand new yellow-white-blue paint scheme and rechristened Montaña Infinitum (Mountain Infinitum). Around 2014, it would be renamed Montaña Triple Loop (Triple Loop Mountain), and later Quimera in 2017, receiving another repaint in the meantime.

=== 2019 accident ===
On September 28, 2019, the derailment of the last car at an approximate height of 33 ft (10 m) resulted in 5 injuries and 2 deaths. This accident was much like that of another Schwarzkopf looping coaster, Mindbender. This accident lead to government officials investigating the park, who found that design flaws and little-to-no maintenance on the ride were to blame. The coaster's track, supports, and trains had also deteriorated due to the coaster being run much faster than it was intended to be. On October 13, the Mexican amusement park authorities announced the indefinite closure of the park, and revoked their operational license. La Feria reopened in 2024 as Aztlán, an urban park with less emphasis on rides.

=== Present ===
In late 2020, Quimera was reportedly being carefully dismantled for relocation from La Feria. The park's Ratón Loco and several other rides had already been removed from the site some time ago. However, it wasn't until the days leading up to the announcement that individuals with inside knowledge had posted information online regarding Quimera's future, stating that it would find a new home at Indiana Beach in Monticello, Indiana. Rumors promptly began to circulate, but it was only days later, on November 24, 2020, that until Indiana Beach released a press statement confirming such. Alongside a used Polyp attraction, it was undergoing a complete refurbishment. On January 19, 2021, Indiana Beach announced that the new coaster would be placed in the gravel parking lot west of Steel Hawg. The ride opened after 3.5 years in May of 2024.

Following guest complaints regarding the shoulder pads, Indiana Beach announced on August 28, 2024 that the shoulder pads would be removed from the ride. It is unclear if the height restriction for this ride will be lowered (was 4' 11" or 59" (150cm) due to the shoulder pads only holding riders of at least that size in its max position).

== See also ==
- 1986 Mindbender accident, for a similar accident in Galaxyland, Alberta, Canada
