= Indiana Beach =

Amusement park in Monticello, Indiana

- Previously known as Ideal Beach (1926 to 1951)
- Interactive map of Indiana Beach
- Location: 5224 East Indiana Beach Blvd, Monticello, Indiana, United States
- Coordinates: 40.79°N 86.77°W
- Status: Operating
- Opened: 1926
- Owner: IB Parks & Entertainment
- Slogan: "There's more than corn in Indiana!" (previously: "Where Families Flock For Fun" & "The riviera of the midwest!")
- Operating season: May through October
- Area: 10 acres (4.0 ha)

Attractions
- Total: 43
- Roller coasters: 7
- Water rides: 4
- Website: www.indianabeach.com

Indiana Beach is an amusement park located on Lake Shafer in Monticello, Indiana. The resort was developed by the Spackman family, who owned it from 1926 to 2008. The park was then sold to Morgan RV LLC, Apex Parks Group, LLC, and now is owned and operated by IB Parks & Entertainment.

== History ==
Originally named Ideal Beach, the amusement park began as a small lakeside beach with a bath house and refreshment stand opened by Earl W. Spackman. In 1927, the first thrill attraction opened, and from that point, it began to expand. In the 1930s and 1940s, it was popular for the Ideal Beach Ballroom, featuring well-known bands. In 1961, Indiana Beach added a paddle wheeler boat called the Shafer Queen, which operated for 11 years before being replaced by another paddle wheeler with the same name.

In February 2008, both the amusement park and Indiana Beach campgrounds were sold to Morgan RV LLC. On September 1, 2015, the park was sold to Apex Parks Group.

On February 18, 2020, Indiana Beach suddenly announced that it would permanently close after 94 years of operation, with no plans to reopen. Apex Parks Group cited financial difficulties for the closure and said they had "worked diligently" to find a new buyer for the park but had not been successful. In addition to dozens of seasonal workers, Indiana Beach employed 27 people in administrative and maintenance positions. Those workers were offered six weeks compensation.

In March 2020, Apex Parks Group said that it was in discussions with potential buyers of the park, and that it was possible that the park would be able to reopen that year. Because Indiana Beach generates a large part of the county's tourism revenue, White County officials agreed to offer $3 million from the White County Windfarm Economic Development Fund to the buyer after the sale was complete.

In April 2020, Indiana Beach announced that the park would be reopening that year. The park was purchased by Chicago businessman Gene Staples, subject to approval of a $3 million loan from White County. The park reopened on June 27, 2020.

== Rides ==
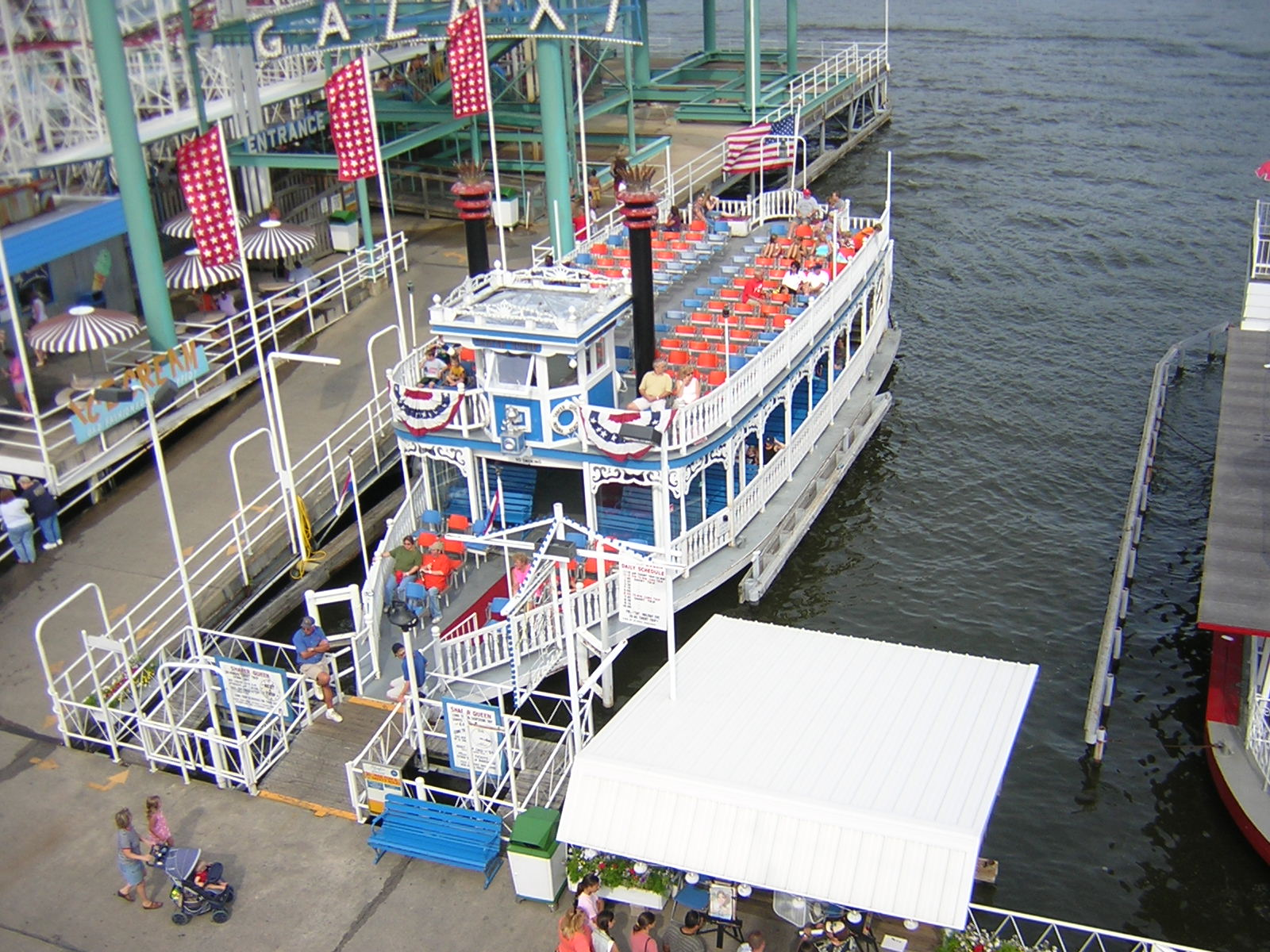
Shafer Queen

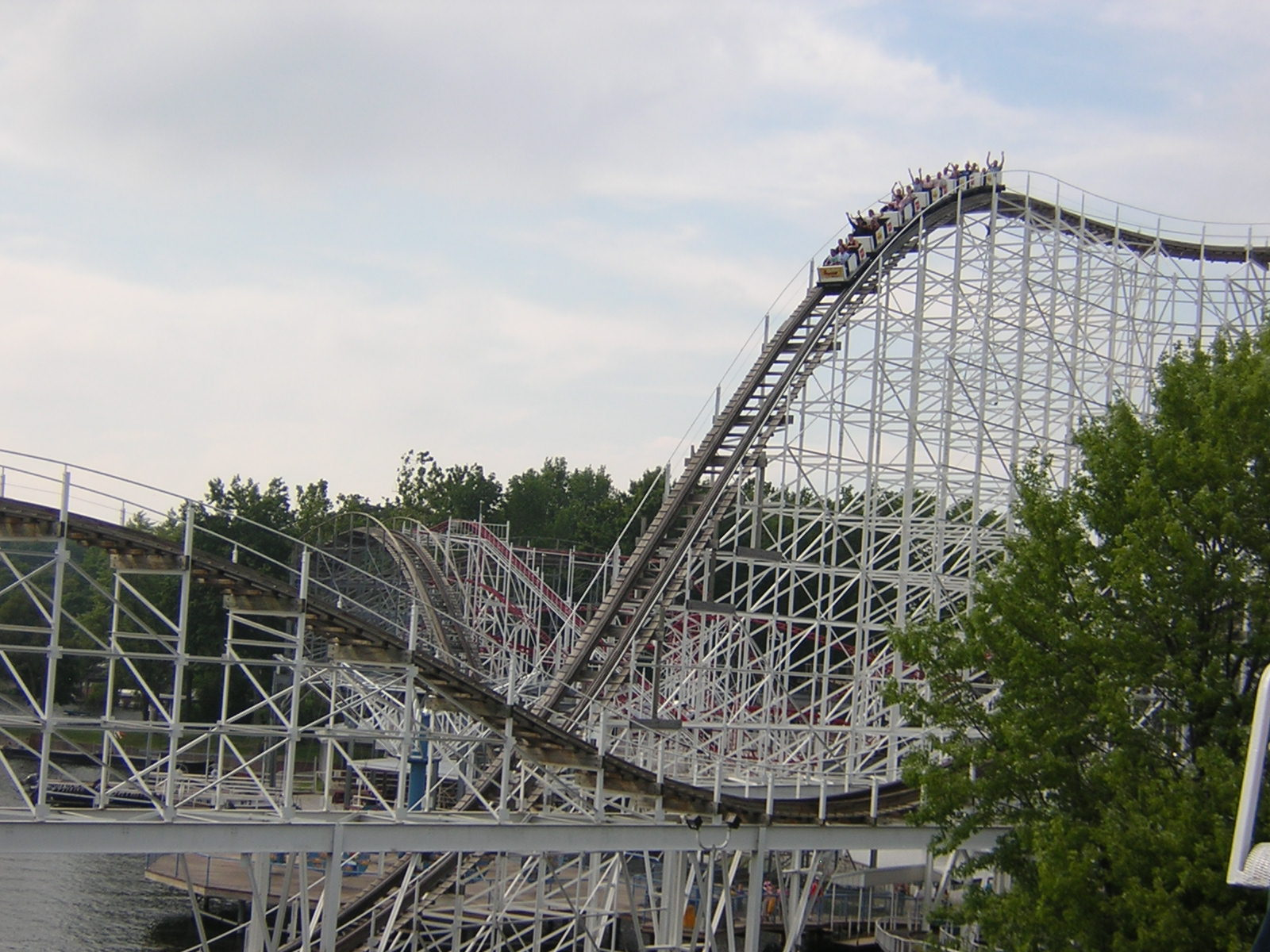
Hoosier Hurricane

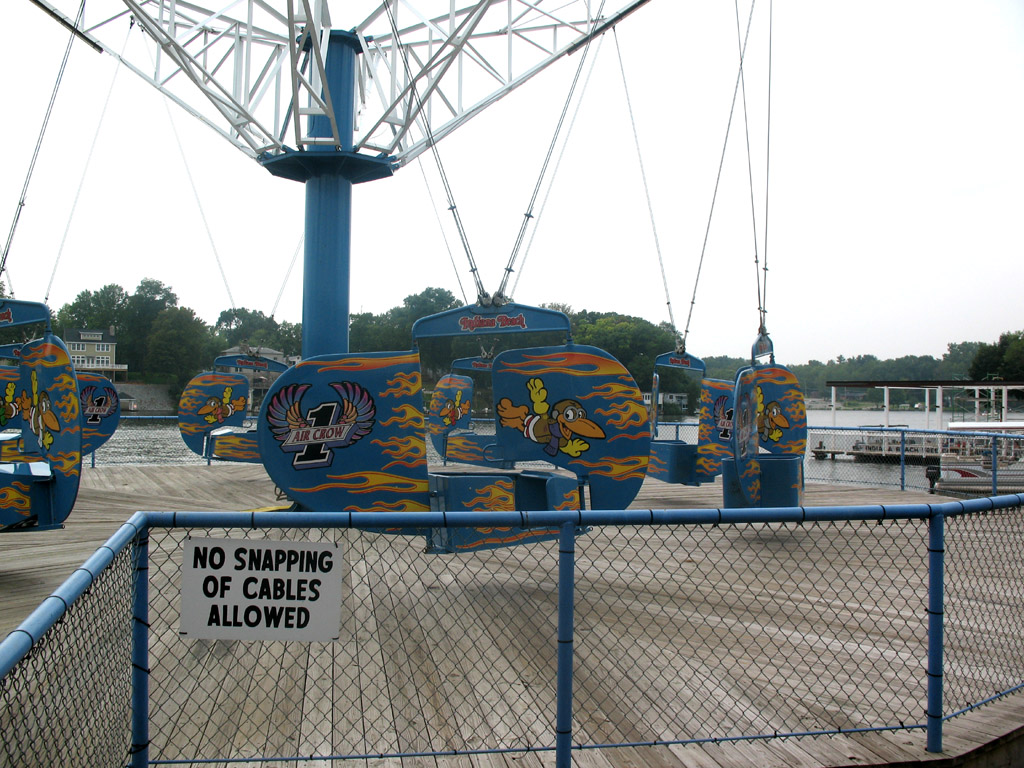
Air Crow

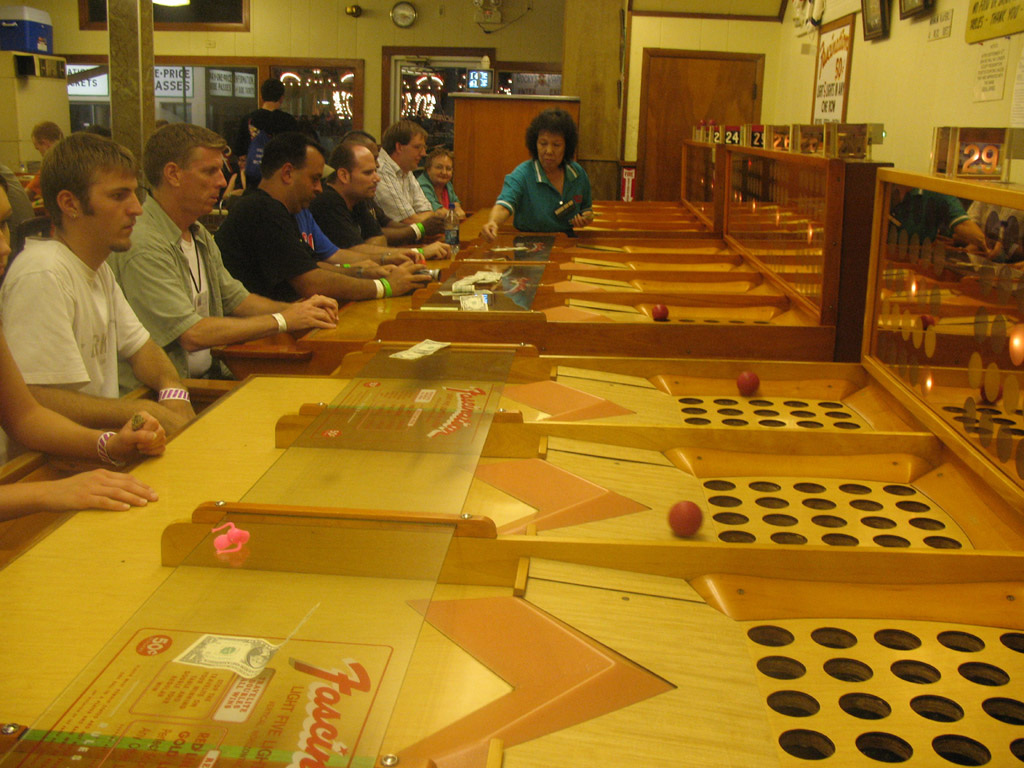
Carnival Games

=== Roller coasters ===
Name	Year opened	Type	Manufacturer/Model	Comments
Cornball Express	2001	Wooden roller coaster	Custom Coasters International	Shares the same support as Hoosier Hurricane
Hoosier Hurricane	1994	Wooden roller coaster	Custom Coasters International	Shares the same support as Cornball Express
Lost Coaster of Superstition Mountain	2002	Elevator lift wooden coaster	Custom Coasters International	Built at the site of the former Superstition Mountain Mine Ride
Steel Hawg	2008	El Loco	S&S - Sansei Technologies	A unique coaster with a beyond vertical drop that was once the world's steepest coaster
Tig'rr Coaster	1984	Steel, Jet Star	Schwarzkopf	Oldest operating roller coaster at Indiana Beach and formerly operated at Holiday Beach in Douglas, Georgia
All American Triple Loop	2024	Steel, Triple Loop Coaster	Schwarzkopf	Formerly operated at the German fair circuit; Sunway Lagoon in Subang Jaya, Malaysia; Flamingo Land in North Yorkshire, England; and La Feria Chapultepec Magico in Mexico City, Mexico.
Cyclone	2022	Galaxi	Robles Bouso Atracciones	Located at the site of the park's original Galaxi Roller Coaster and formerly operated with Garcia Attractions' traveling carnival in Mexico.

=== Water park attractions and rides ===
Name	Year opened	Type	Comments
Action river	1989	Lazy River	
Big Flush Water Coaster	1998	Water Coaster	
Sandy Beach swimming area	1926	Swimming area with a recirculating pool	
Splash bash water spray pad	1989	Splash Pad	
5 tube slides	1989	3 enclosed slides, 2 open slides	Repainted for the 2016 season

=== Major rides ===
Name	Year opened	Type	Comments
Air Crow	2004	Larson International Flying Scooters	
Antique Autos	1960s	Antique car ride	
Den of Lost Thieves	1998	Sally Corporation Shooting dark ride	
Dodgem	1960s	Bumper cars	
Double Shot	1998	S&S Power Double Shot tower ride	
Falling Star	1990	Chance Rides Falling Star	Opened on the boardwalk, near the South Gate. In 2011, it was taken down and moved to the storage lot behind Steel Hawg. For the 2013/2014 season, it was relocated yet again next to the Hoosier Hurricane station.
Flying Bobs	2020	Allan Herschell Company Alpine Bobs	Not to be confused with another Flying Bobs attraction that had previously operated at the park. Formerly located at Coney Island from 1994 to 2019.
Giant Gondola Wheel	1989	Chance Rides Ferris wheel	
Music Express	2011	Mack Rides Music Express	
Nao de China	TBD	Weber Traumboot	Formerly located at La Feria de Chapultepec until its closure in 2019.
Paratrooper	1970s	Frank Hrubetz Paratrooper	
Rockin' Tug	2014	Zamperla Tugboat Spining Ride	
Rocky's Rapids	1986	Arrow Dynamics Log flume	Relocated from the former Pontchartrain Beach, which closed in 1983.
Scrambler	1960s	Eli Bridge Company Scrambler	
Sea Dragon		Chance Rides Pirate ship	
Sea Warrior	2021	Klaus (SDC) Polyp	Relocated from Lake Winnepesaukah in 2020, had previously been located at Kiddieland Park from 1967 up until its closure.
Shafer Queen	1961	Paddle Wheel Riverboat	The original boat was retired for other usage in 1972 and a newer set was known to have been bought for the 1973 season.
Skyride	1960s	Chairlift	
Spackman Express		Chance Rides C. P. Huntington Miniature Train Ride	Runs along much of the park's length.
Tilt-A-Whirl	1997	Sellner Tilt-A-Whirl	
Water Swings	1992	Chance Rides Yo-Yo	
Zero Gravity	2026	SBF Visa	

=== Attractions ===
- Cap'n Crow's Bumper Boats
- Dr. Frankenstein's Haunted Castle – A walk-through attraction
- SkyCoaster

=== Kiddieland ===
- Beach Buggies
- Boardwalk Balloons
- Boogie Boats
- Crazy Carp
- Leap Frog
- Little Eli Wheel
- Mini Motors
- Rocky's Roundup
- Rockin' Tug
- Wild Wagons

=== Former rides ===
- Bullet
- Chaos (1997–2007) Chance Rides
- Flying Bobs (Chance TM) removed in 2013 to make room for Viper
- Grand Carousel Chance Rides the 50' Grand Carousel (removal in 2019)
- Dragon Wagon (2014–2018)
- Galaxi (roller coaster) (1971–2013)
- Growler (2014–2019) Wisdom Tornado spinning Family Ride
- Mystery Mansion
- Paratrooper (Original Model)
- Pumpkin Ferris Wheel
- Skydiver
- Splash Battle (2006–2015)
- Superstition Mountain Mine Ride
- Trabant
- Twister
- Viper (2014–2015) Wisdom Viper
- Zero G (2016–2020) Larson International Ring of Fire
- Zugspitz

=== Former attractions ===
- Adventure Point
- Boat Tag

== Games ==
- Fascination
- Gallery of Ghouls – Shooting gallery
- Skee Ball
- Video Arcade

== Lodging and cabins ==
Lodging at Indiana Beach includes hotel, motel and cabin accommodations with varying prices, sleeping capacities and amenities. Multiple other motels and hotels surround Indiana Beach, some of which offer lake access. There are also campground facilities named Indiana Beach/Monticello KOA containing approximately 1,000 camp sites.

== Controversies ==
In 2011, former and current employees staged a protest due to working and safety conditions at the park, claiming that "Rides are continuously closed, or many times forced to be open using rigged components because the company will not or cannot pay for the parts that will allow maintenance to fix them properly." An inspector from the state's division of Homeland Security investigated as a result of the protest and found no major safety violations.

It was reported in December 2012 that Morgan RV LLC had sold 11 of its properties to Sun Communities Operating Limited Partnership LLC of Michigan for $135 million. Among the listed properties was Ideal Private Resorts LLC, whose website includes Indiana Beach Amusement Park and Indiana Beach Accommodations as destinations. Calls by news media to Morgan RV LLC requesting comment, including confirmation or denial that all or part of Indiana Beach was included in the sale, went unanswered.

In January 2013, local news affiliates reported Morgan RV LLC was delinquent paying property and innkeeper taxes totaling approximately $347,000 to White County, where Indiana Beach is located. The CEO of then-owner Morgan RV, Robert Moser, and Indiana Beach's general manager, Bob Gallagher, stated that the park would open for the 2014 season despite misgivings stated by Monticello residents and business owners.

On June 27, 2019, a twelve-year-old boy died after suffering a medical emergency on a roller coaster at the park; it was determined it was not caused by Indiana Beach or the ride.
