= Hoosier Hurricane =

Amusement ride

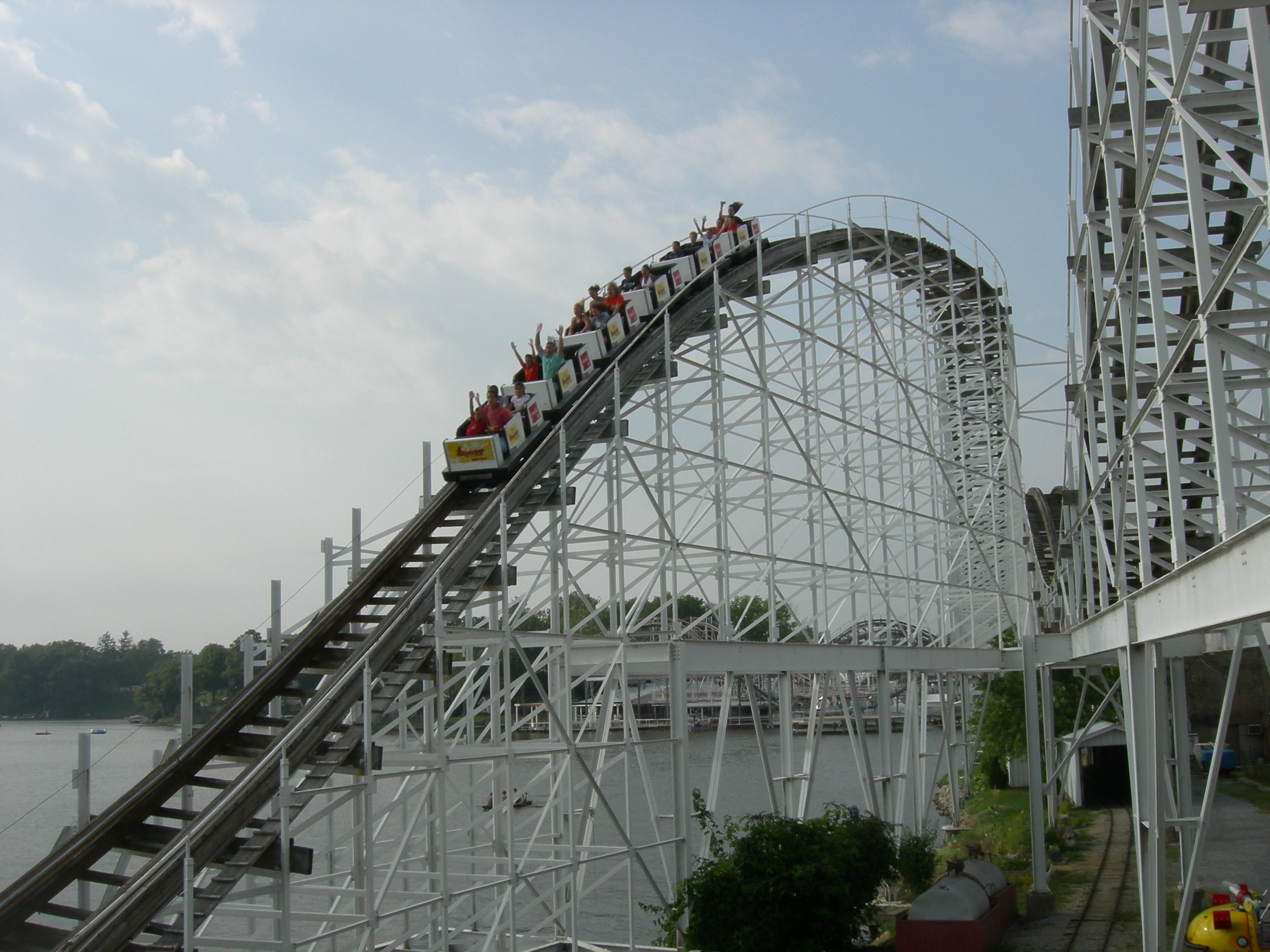
- A train full of riders on Hoosier Hurricane.

Indiana Beach
- Location: Indiana Beach
- Coordinates: 40°47′25″N 86°46′14″W
- Status: Operating
- Opening date: May 27, 1994

General statistics
- Type: Wood
- Manufacturer: Custom Coasters International
- Designer: Dennis McNulty Larry Bill
- Track layout: Wood
- Lift/launch system: Chain
- Height: 77 ft (23 m)
- Drop: 98 ft (30 m)
- Length: 2,891 ft (881 m)
- Speed: 51 mph (82 km/h)
- Inversions: 0
- Height restriction: 48 in (122 cm)
- Trains: 2 trains with 6 cars. Riders are arranged 2 across in 2 rows for a total of 24 riders per train.
- Hoosier Hurricane at RCDB

Hoosier Hurricane is a wooden roller coaster at the Indiana Beach amusement park in Monticello, Indiana. The ride was designed by Dennis McNulty and Larry Bill of Custom Coasters International. It opened on May 27, 1994, as the park's largest wooden roller coaster and the first wooden roller coaster built in Indiana in fifty years. The ride was Custom Coasters International's third roller coaster designed and the first modern wooden coaster built with a steel support structure, which would eventually become a trend on many wooden coasters designed by them.

Hoosier Hurricane, like other coasters in the park, was 'shoehorned' into the park. The ride hugs the shores of Lake Shafer, parallels most of the boardwalk, and suddenly turns near the Giant Gondola Wheel. Hurricane's structure is shared with nearby Cornball Express for a small portion of the ride (the S-turn before the drop).

Hoosier Hurricane is designed to accommodate two trains, but due to low attendance, the park typically only runs one, and wait times are generally short.

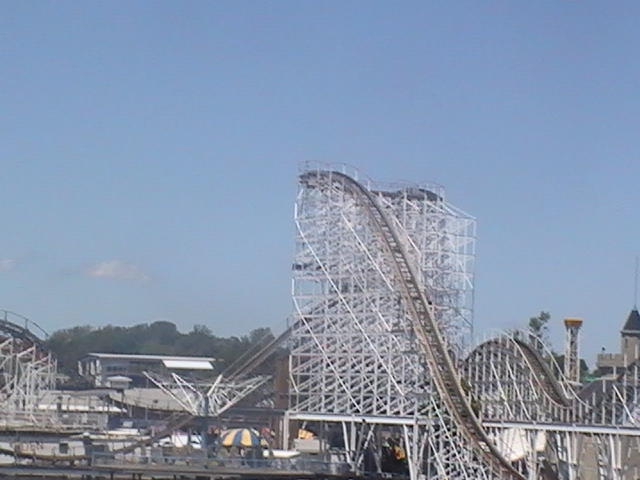
The lift hill view from the bridge

Hoosier Hurricane was originally slated to be named Cornball Express while it was being designed, however the name was tossed in favor of Hoosier Hurricane. The name Cornball Express was eventually given to the Park's second wooden coaster, built in 2001.

== Layout ==
The Hoosier Hurricane starts off with boarding the trains (designed by Philadelphia Toboggan Coasters) and pulling down the "buzz bar" restraint before dispatch. The train then crawls out the station and starts the trek up the 77-foot-tall (23 m) lift hill.

At the top of the hill, the Train enters an 'S-curve' and slows down before soaring down the 98 ft first drop. The drop is longer than the lift hill due to the station being elevated above ground. The train then enters a double-up before making a slight right turn and going down a hill under the suspension bridge located at the south end of the park. The train then enters the large turnaround at the end of the boardwalk before entering a couple more airtime hills. the track then makes an unbanked right hand turn before going back under the structure of itself and Cornball Express. The train then goes through one more bunny hill before hitting the final brake run. If 2 trains are being used, the train then waits there until the 2nd train is dispatched, before taking a left hand turn into a transfer track followed by a 180-degree turn into the station.

== History ==
In 2019, Brayden Cooper-Douglas, a 12-year-old child, died while riding Hoosier Hurricane. His parents sued the park's then owners, Apex Parks Group, for negligence.

In 2019, on the ride's 25th anniversary, the park refurbished with the ride as well as its trains, painting them Royal blue and adding new decals to the side and front.
