= Tig'rr Coaster =

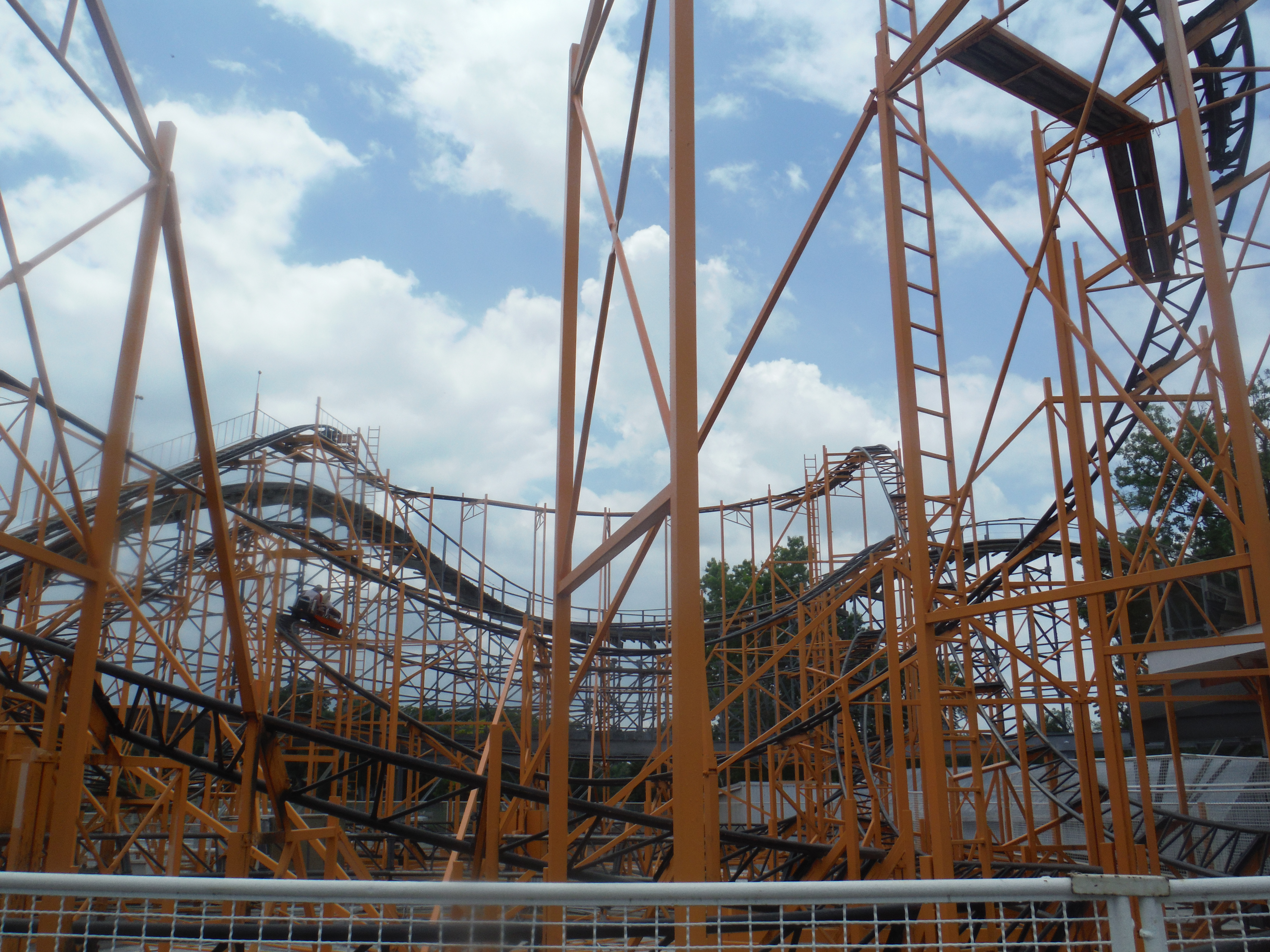

Indiana Beach
- Location: Indiana Beach
- Coordinates: 40°47′25″N 86°46′14″W
- Status: Operating
- Opening date: 1984

General statistics
- Type: Steel
- Manufacturer: Anton Schwarzkopf
- Designer: Werner Stengel
- Model: Jet Star
- Height: 44.25 ft (13.49 m)
- Length: 1,765 ft (538 m)
- Speed: 31.1 mph (50.1 km/h)
- Inversions: 0
- Height restriction: 54 in (137 cm)
- Trains: 3 trains with a single car. Riders are arranged 1 across in 4 rows for a total of 4 riders per train.
- Tig'rr Coaster at RCDB

Tig'rr is a steel roller coaster located at Indiana Beach amusement park located on Lake Shafer in Monticello, Indiana. It was Indiana Beach's second roller coaster, and is one of only a few roller coasters built entirely on a pre-existing building. It has a maximum speed of 49 miles per hour (79 km/h) and is 39 feet (12 m) tall. It is one of 3 Anton Schwarzkopf "Jet Star" models still operating, and the only one still operating in North America. Of the five coasters at Indiana Beach still currently operating, Tig'rr is the only one with a height restriction of 54". This restriction is because of the extreme turns the coaster takes. Tig'rr used to not contain any restraints, but retractable seat belts have since been added. In 2016, the Tig'rr received a paint job. The track was changed from red to black and the supports were changed from white to bright orange.

This is the second steel roller coaster at Indiana Beach. The first was Galaxi, which was removed in 2014, and the third is the tallest coaster in the park, Steel Hawg, which opened in 2008.
