= Lost Coaster of Superstition Mountain =

Roller coaster in Indiana

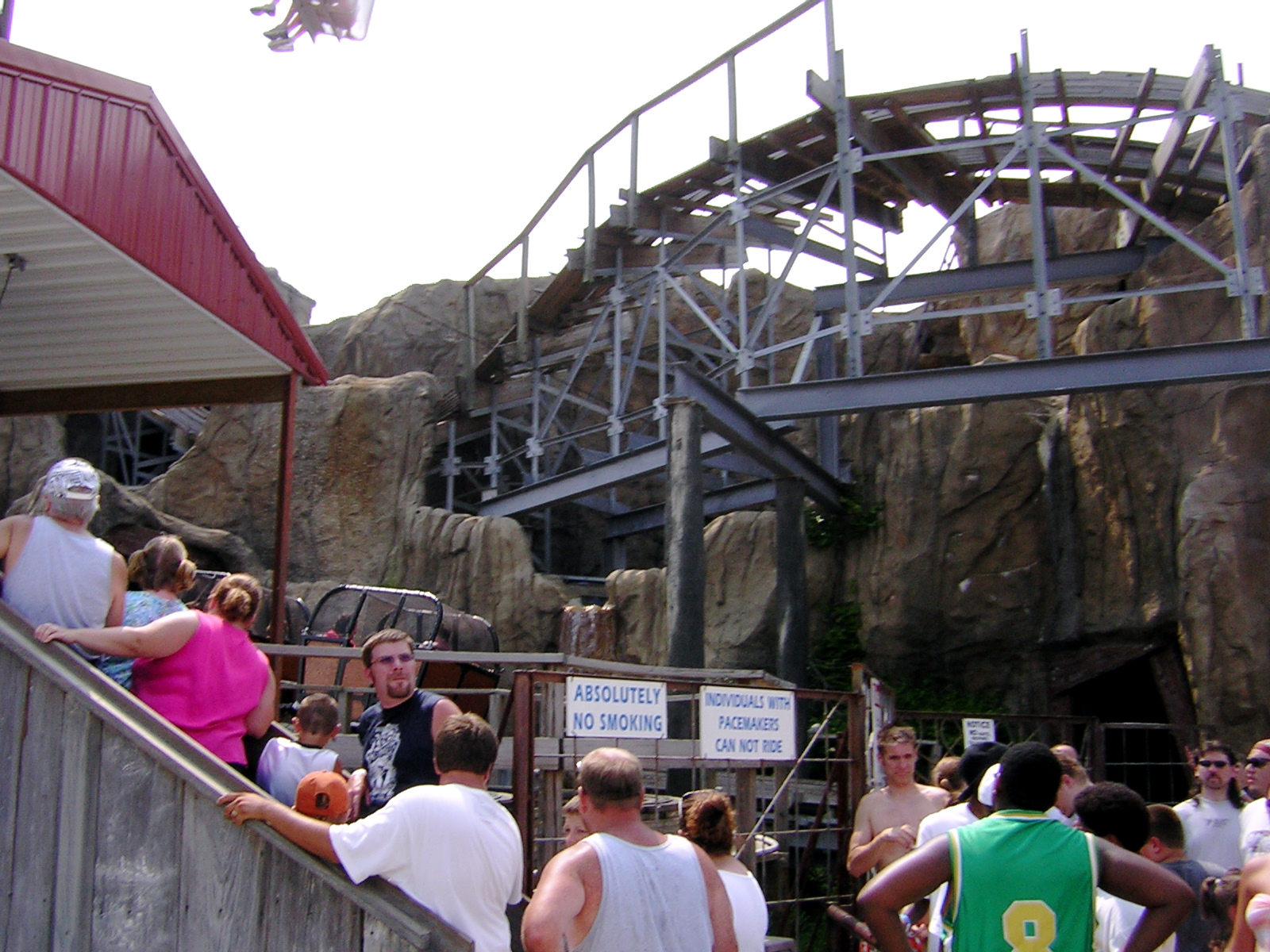

Indiana Beach
- Location: Indiana Beach
- Coordinates: 40°47′19″N 86°46′12″W
- Status: Operating
- Opening date: June 6, 2002
- Replaced: Superstition Mountain Mine Ride

General statistics
- Type: Wood
- Manufacturer: Custom Coasters International
- Lift/launch system: Elevator Lift
- Height: 35 ft (11 m)
- Length: 1,400 ft (430 m)
- Speed: 20 mph (32 km/h)
- Height restriction: 48 in (122 cm)
- Trains: 3 trains with 2 cars. Riders are arranged 2 across in 2 rows for a total of 8 riders per train.
- Lost Coaster of Superstition Mountain at RCDB

The Lost Coaster of Superstition Mountain is a wooden roller coaster at Indiana Beach in Monticello, Indiana, themed to a mine shaft. It was the last coaster Custom Coasters International (CCI) finished (they had also started work on New Mexico Rattler at Cliff's Amusement Park but went bankrupt before its completion). The ride uses an elevator lift to raise the cars to the top of the track as opposed to the more traditional lift hill. CCI constructed new cage-enclosed cars due to the proximity between riders and the themed 'mountain' sections of the ride. Eight people may ride in a two-car train simultaneously. Two face forward and two backward, opposite each other in each car.

The ride enters an enclosed 'mountain' area several times throughout the ride. The imitation mountain was originally used for a previous dark ride. This dark ride went through the mountain and lights would illuminate scenes of various animals in the mountain.

The ride itself has been open since the mid-1980s as a mine like car ride with no hills or wooden tracks. The original ride's opening was delayed before officially opening in the 1980s.

Lost Coaster was designed to operate three eight-passenger trains.

The Gravity Group, which is run by the former CCI designers, stated that Lost Coaster was the inspiration for the design of Twister at Gröna Lund in Sweden.

== Layout ==
=== Station ===
Riders start by boarding the train in one of two cars, either facing forwards or backwards. The ride operator then dispatches the train, which makes a right hand turn into a trim brake before entering the elevator lift. The train is stopped by a brake, and the elevator starts to ascend the 35 ft (11 m) elevator shaft. While in the elevator, a skeleton animatronic gives one of three pre-recorded spiels.

=== Floor 3 ===
Once at the top, the brake releases, sending the train out of the elevator and into a sharp turnaround. The train then briefly enters the mountain, making a left hand turn before exiting again. The car navigates some airtime hills before making a sharp turn. The car then rises into the mountain once more. The car makes a sharp right-hand turn and then a sharp left-hand turn, before transitioning slowly into a turnaround that leads to the mid-course brake run.

During the midcourse, the train comes to a complete stop, and a short show scene plays in which a character dubbed 'Dynamite Willie' yells "Fire in the hole!" and pushes down a detonator, setting off fake explosions and sending the train off.

=== Floor 2 ===
After the midcourse, the train falls into a double-down and then into a sharp right-hand turn, momentarily bringing riders outside the mountain before re-entering it. The train then passes show scenes based on the ride's abandoned mineshaft theme including a bear which came from the original Superstition Mountain Mine Ride. The train then navigates further unbanked right and left turns, before slowly making a left-hand turn, and exiting the mountain once again, passing next to the 'Antique Autos' ride, then making another left-hand turn and entering back into the mountain.

=== Floor 1 ===
The car passes through a circular tunnel left from the old Mine Ride, before hitting a magnetic brake which slows the train down. The car then makes a sharp turn before passing through a scene where it appears that rocks are falling due to an earthquake. The train then makes a final turnaround into a scene where there is a prop train that the car is heading towards. The train blows its whistle and the car makes a sharp left turn.

=== Final Brake Run ===
The train then goes into a set of traction tires that push the train up into a left-hand turn, followed by another set of traction tires that push the train up into the final brake run. The train then waits there until the next train is dispatched or the station is open. Riders then exit the train and the ride is over.

== History ==
=== Construction ===
Superstition Mountain operated at Indiana Beach from 1984 to 2001. The park opted to turn the ride into a roller coaster, contracting CCI, which built both of Indiana Beach's previous wooden roller coasters. During the 2001 offseason, Indiana Beach employees began disassembling the old ride to prepare for construction. As some of the ride's turns would have a radius of 6 feet (1.8 m), CCI created new trains for the ride. Originally, the cars did not have any kind of cage around them, but it was determined that cages were needed to protect guests from potential harm. On Friday, May 17, 2002, the new coaster was announced at a media event. The coaster officially opened on June 6, 2002.

=== 2002 Offseason ===
In the offseason of 2002, the ride was updated to include more features and upgrades, such as new animatronics, props, and plumbing for a waterfall. The top of the mountain was also finished, adding another floor to increase its height.
