= Aztlán Parque Urbano =

Amusement park in Mexico City, Mexico

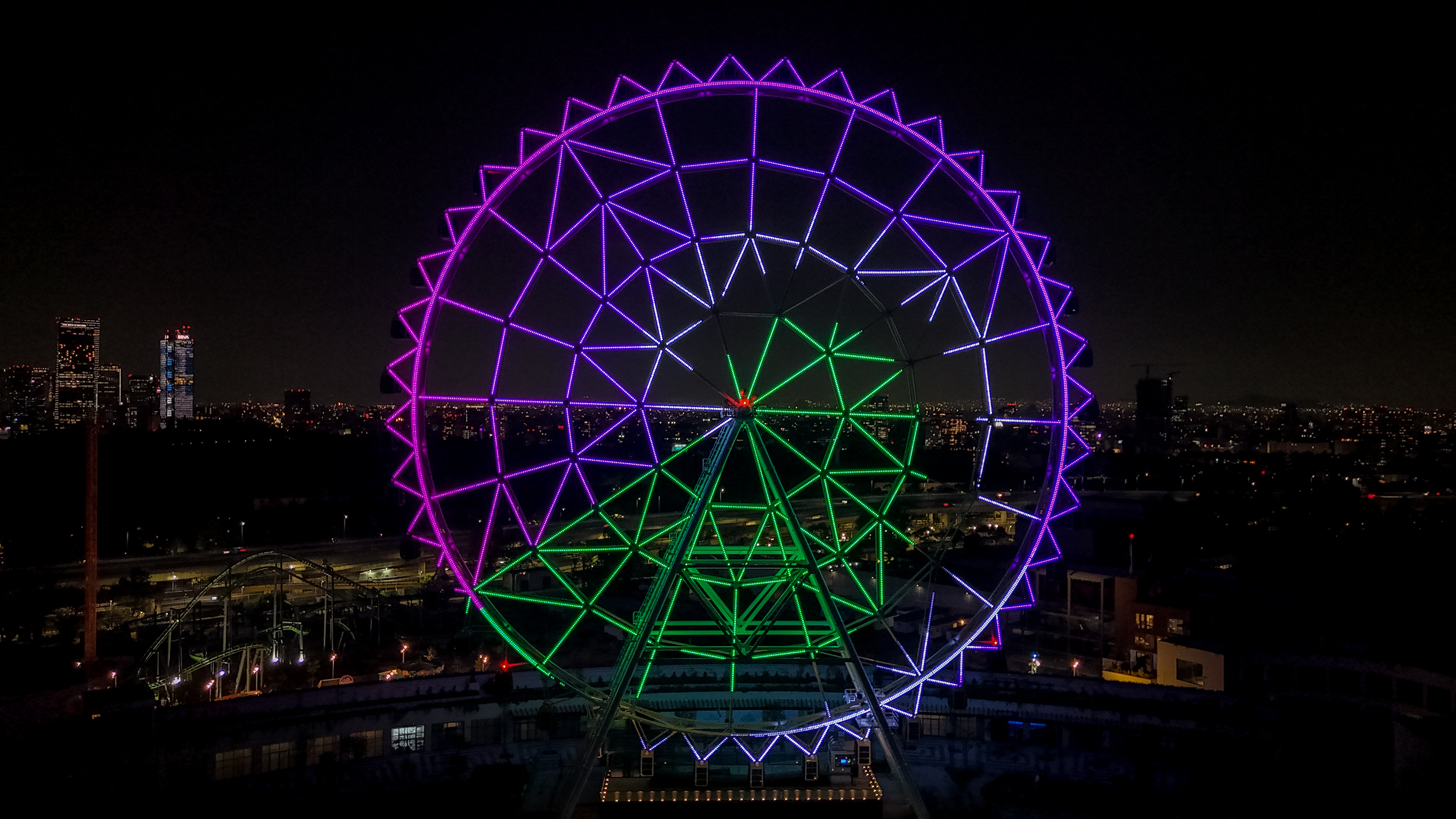
- Aztlán 360 Ferris wheel
- Interactive map of Aztlán Parque Urbano
- Location: Chapultepec, Mexico City, Mexico
- Coordinates: 19.4160°N 99.1955°W.
- Status: Operating
- Opened: March 20, 2024
- Website: Official website

Aztlán Parque Urbano is an amusement park in Chapultepec, Mexico City, Mexico. The park first opened on March 20, 2024, and replaced the amusement park La Feria de Chapultepec that closed in 2019.

== Background ==
Mota Engil and Thor Urbana invested 3.6 billion pesos (214.8 million US dollar) into developing the park. The decision to make a new park in the area was made following a survey of the residents of the city. The park was scheduled to open in August 2023 but the project was delayed.

The park also includes restaurants including: Señor Burger, serving American food and Los Titanes del Taco, A Taco restaurant. More eateries are planned to be opened in the future.

== Attractions ==
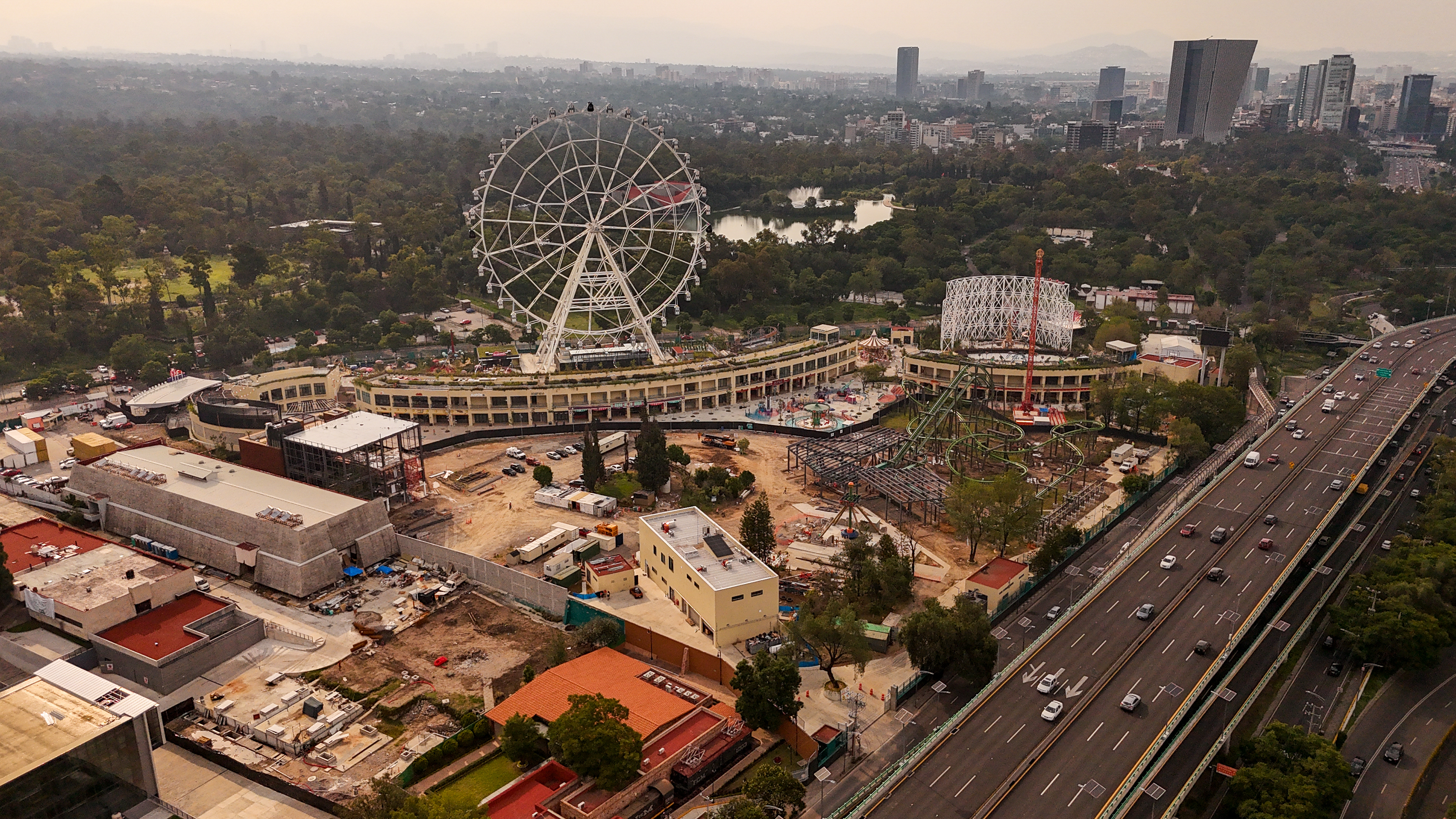
The park in 2024

Aztlán Park includes several special areas and spaces: The green areas which includes gardens, picnic areas and an artificial lake. Foro Aztlán for outdoor shows. There are also some educational spaces such as: A botanical garden, a butterfly garden, and a planetarium. Soccer, basketball, and volleyball courts and a running and cycling circuit.

=== General rides ===
Attraction	Opened	Description
Aztlán 360 Ferris wheel	2024	85-meter high Ferris wheel.
Chapultepec Carousel	2024	
Grinder	2024	crazy cups.
La Rocoloa Chocona	2024	Bumper cars.
Cantoya flight	2024	vehicles that rises up to 3 meters high.
Flying kick	2024	flying spinning swings.
Swirl	2024	

=== Roller coasters ===
Attraction	Opened	Description
Montaña Jurásica	2024	
The Mocha	2024	calm and low speed roller coaster.

=== Children's rides ===
Attraction	Opened	Description
Guardians of the air	2024	flying airplane-shaped vehicles ride.
Astrolumium	2024	low speed swing.
Fury on wheels	2024	circular rotating cars.
The Breaker	2024	A gondola that goes up and down on a tower.
Cockroach	2024	bumper cars for kids.

=== Other attraction ===
Attraction	Opened	Description
Sinister	2024	virtual-reality haunted house
The Fifth Sun	2024	
The Dolores Olmedo Museum	2024	
Theater	2024	theater that tells the history of Tenochtitlán.

=== Future attractions ===
- Marometas: Low-impact roller coaster.
- Laka Laka: Roller coaster with rotating gondolas.
- Fly Mexico around the world: Flight simulator.
- Garden of the senses: An erea of interactive gardens.
- Serpentikha: 540 meters long roller coaster.
- Malacatonche: Rotating seats.
- Don Goyo: 50 meters free fall.

== See also ==
- La Feria de Chapultepec
