= La Feria de Chapultepec =

Former amusement park in Mexico City, Mexico

- Previously known as Juegos Mecánicos de Chapultepec; La Feria Chapultepec Mágico
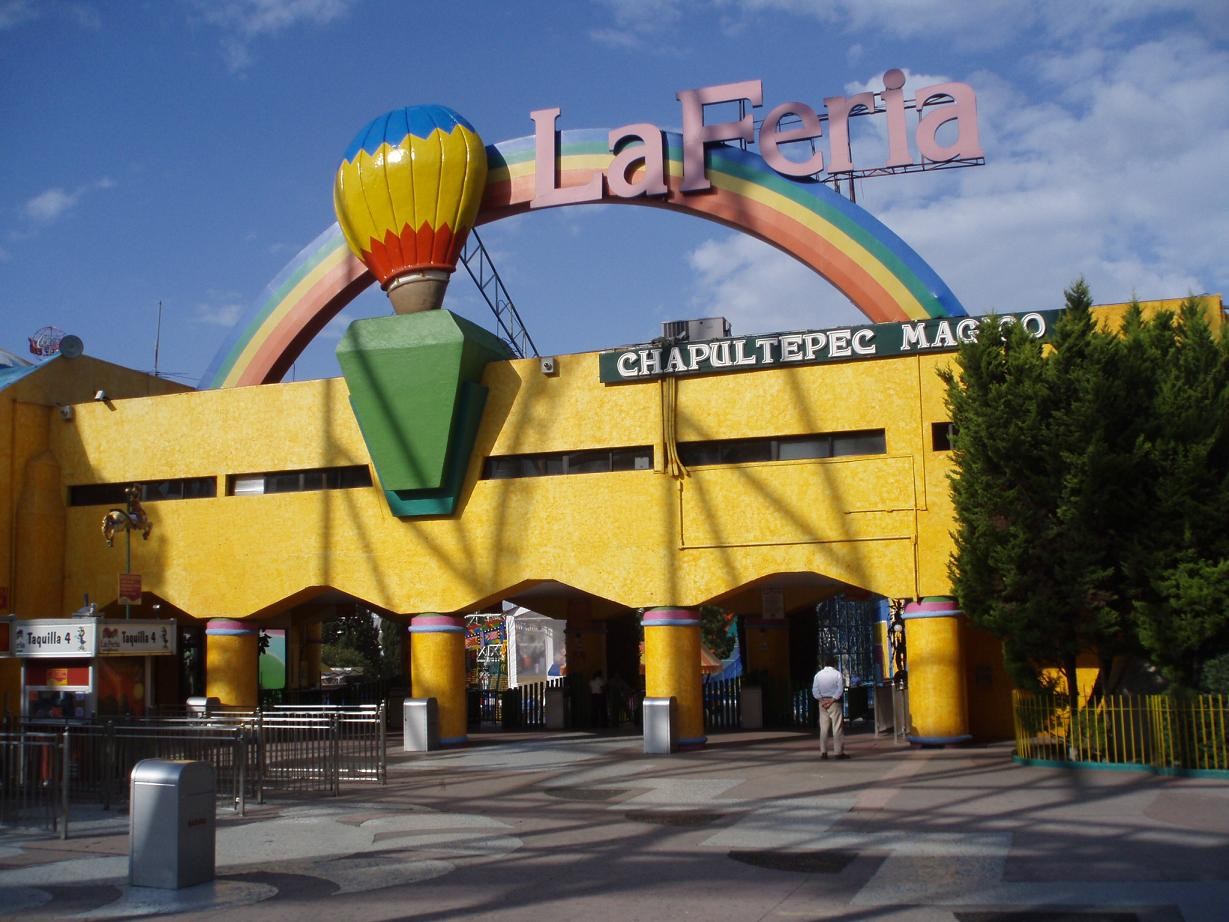
- La Feria in 2007
- Interactive map of La Feria de Chapultepec
- Location: Mexico City, Mexico
- Coordinates: 19°24′59″N 99°11′44″W
- Opened: 1964
- Closed: October 13, 2019
- Owner: Ventura Entertainment

Attractions
- Roller coasters: 4

La Feria de Chapultepec (transl. Chapultepec Fair), simply branded as La Feria, was an amusement park in Mexico City, Mexico. Located in the middle of Chapultepec Park near the Constituyentes Metro station, it opened in 1964 as Juegos Mecánicos de Chapultepec (transl. Chapultepec Mechanical Games) and was originally operated by the Mexican government. In 1992 Grupo CIE bought it and changed the name to La Feria Chapultepec Mágico (transl. Magic Chapultepec Fair). In 2015, it was bought by Ventura Entertainment and renamed to its last name.

On 28 September 2019 an accident on the Quimera roller coaster killed two people and injured two others. An investigation determined that design flaws by its designer along with a lack of maintenance by the personnel were likely to blame for the accident. On 13 October 2019, the amusement park authorities announced on their official website the definitive closure of the park after the Mexico City Government revoked their license. After Ventura Entertainment lost the license, the government sent a message to other park companies such as Six Flags, Cedar Fair, and Seaworld to take over the license of the property. After Bosque de Chapultepec reopened, most of La Feria's furniture and fences that separate the attractions are being dismantled and the property is being cleaned, and the new owner is yet to be announced, since the six companies that were interested asked for the period of selection, which was meant to be until 20 April 2020, to be extended because of the COVID-19 pandemic, so the government is yet to announce the new date. The replacement was named Aztlán Parque Urbano.

== Attractions ==
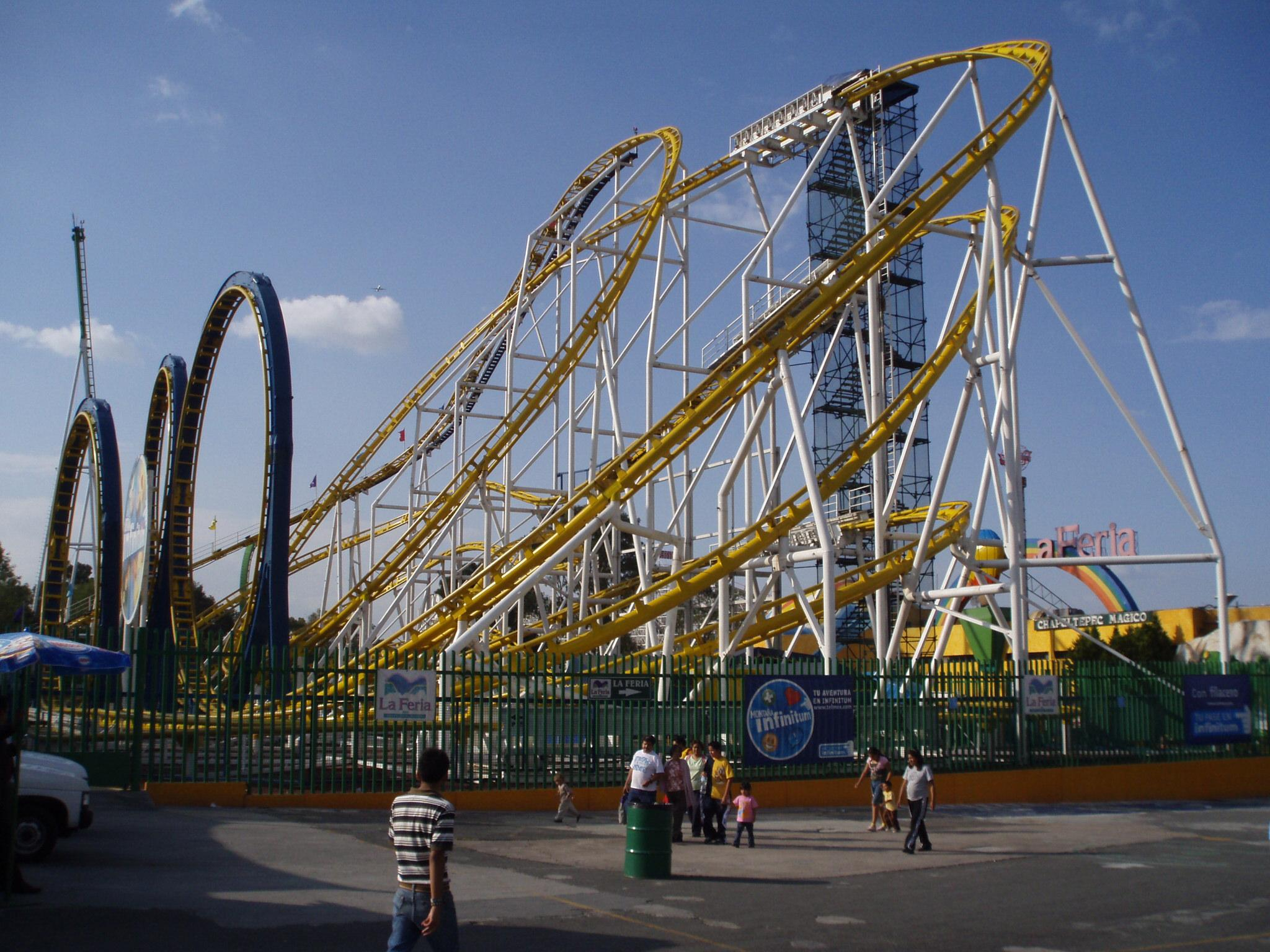
Quimera

La Feria Chapultepec Mágico had approximately 50 different rides and other amusements, as well as several animal attractions. While this list includes many flat rides, it also includes several former record-holding roller coasters: among these, Montaña Rusa, which held the world's record for tallest roller coaster, and Quimera, which was the first roller coaster in the world with three vertical loops. One of the coasters, Cascabel, was formerly at Kennywood amusement park near Pittsburgh, Pennsylvania. The park also had a wild mouse roller coaster named Ratón Loco.

Another of the park's noteworthy attractions was a zero-emission scenic train that was developed with the help of the Institute of Engineering at the National Autonomous University of Mexico. The train was reported by La Crónica de Hoy to be the first of its kind when it was opened for Ecofest 2012.

== Pricing and admission ==
Some travel guides cited the relatively low cost of visiting La Feria when compared to other North American amusement parks. The park had a multi-tiered pricing structure for its ride passes. Lower cost passes allowed for admission to many of the smaller flat rides, while more expensive passes allowed for admission to the more extreme rides, such as the roller coasters.

== Roller coasters ==
- Cascabel
- Montaña Rusa
- Quimera
- Ratón Loco

== Selected thrill rides ==
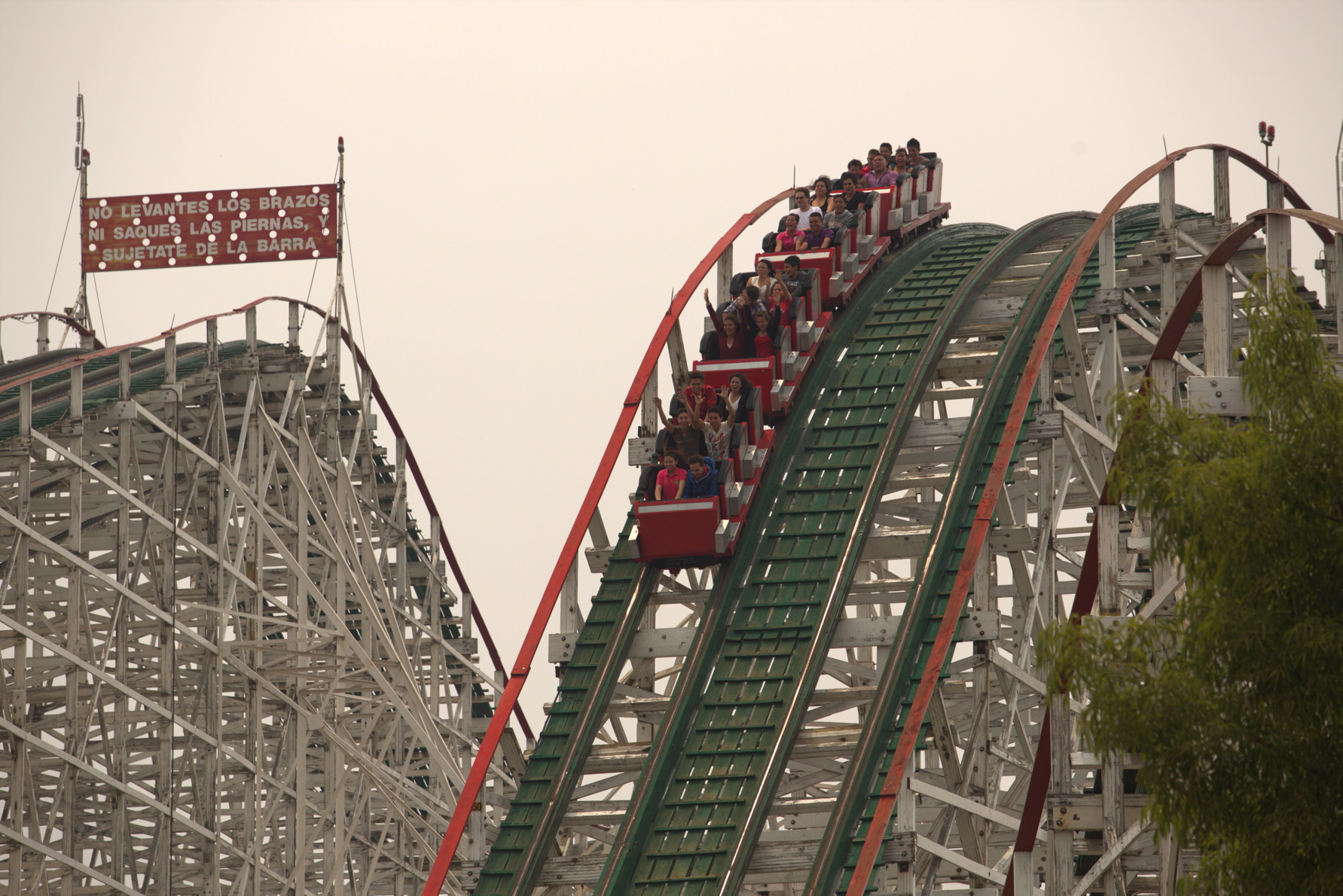
The emblematic traction of The Fair of Chapultepec

- Aladino
- Batidora
- Nao de China
- Avion del Amor
- Martillo
- Tren del Amor
- Cóndor
- Power Tower
- Formula 1 Race Track
- Top Spin
