= Six Flags Great America =

Amusement park in Gurnee, Illinois, US

- Previously known as Marriott's Great America (1976–1984)
- Logo used since 2025

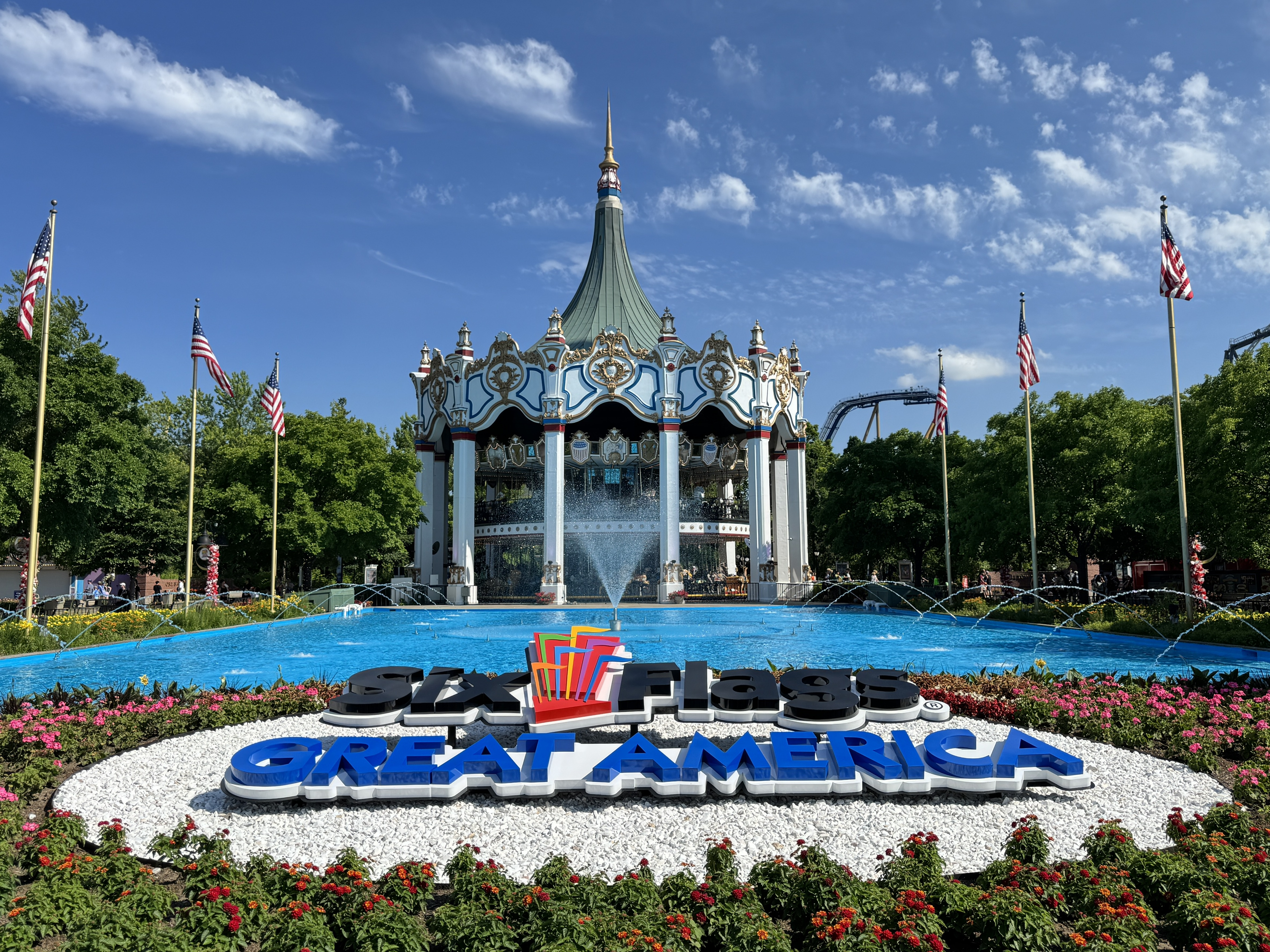
- The park's centerpiece attraction Columbia Carousel in 2026
- Interactive map of Six Flags Great America
- Location: Gurnee, Illinois, U.S.
- Coordinates: 42°22′03″N 87°56′04″W
- Status: Operating
- Public transit: 565, 572
- Opened: May 29, 1976; 50 years ago
- Owner: Six Flags
- Park president: John Krajnak
- General manager: Hardeep Lall
- Slogan: "Thrill Capital of the Midwest"
- Operating season: April to November
- Attendance: ▲3.045 million in 2024
- Area: 275 acres (1.11 km^{2}) (Note: According to the Form 10-K filed by Six Flags for the 2025 fiscal year, 275 acres (111 ha) is the combined developed area of both Six Flags Great America and Hurricane Harbor Chicago. Including undeveloped land, the total combined area of the two parks are 305 acres (123 ha).)

Attractions
- Total: 44 (as of 2026)
- Roller coasters: 16
- Water rides: 3
- Website: www.sixflags.com/greatamerica

Six Flags Great America, also known as Great America, is a 275-acre (111 ha) amusement park in Gurnee, Illinois, United States, between Chicago and Milwaukee. As Illinois' largest amusement park, the park features 44 attractions, including 16 roller coasters. The park is owned and operated by Six Flags. In 2024, it was the sixth-most visited seasonal amusement park in North America and the sixth-most visited Six Flags park, with an estimated 3.05 million guests. Located adjacent to the park is Hurricane Harbor Chicago, a separately-gated water park.

In the 1970s, Marriott Corporation planned to build a theme park chain amidst a trend of developing new theme parks, with one in California and the other in Illinois. Named Marriott's Great America, the park was designed by architect Randall Duell and had an Americana theme. Built at a cost of US$50 million, the park opened to the public on May 29, 1976. It was later sold to Six Flags in 1984, which renamed it Six Flags Great America. Following the acquisition, the park expanded under Six Flags ownership. Major additions include Batman: The Ride in 1992, the world's first inverted roller coaster, and Southwest Territory, a multi-phase project in the mid-to-late 1990s that introduced attractions such as Viper and Raging Bull. Since the 2000s, the park has continued to expand through additions such as the Hurricane Harbor water park and major roller coasters like Goliath and Maxx Force, along with new themed areas and operational changes following the 2024 merger of Cedar Fair and Six Flags.

Six Flags Great America is divided into 11 themed sections, with areas based on Americana and DC Comics, along with children's areas. It operates seasonally from April to November, hosting the annual Halloween event Fright Fest in the fall. The park has received several awards from organizations such as the American Coaster Enthusiasts (ACE) and Amusement Today. Three of the park's roller coasters are designated as ACE Coaster Landmarks, a program which recognizes historically significant roller coasters. The park and its attractions have been featured in popular media such as the movie Richie Rich and the web show Run BTS.

== History ==
=== 1972–1984: Marriott era ===
==== 1972–1976: Development and construction ====
In the early 1970s, the hospitality company Marriott Corporation sought to start a chain of state-of-the-art theme parks in order to capitalize on the trend of rapidly-developing amusement parks throughout the United States that began in the 1960s. Each of these parks would be named Marriott's Great America and themed around American history, and would open in time for the nation's bicentennial. From the beginning, three parks were planned, as Marriott identified underserved metropolitan areas that could support a major amusement park: Baltimore–Washington, the San Francisco Bay Area, and Chicago–Milwaukee. Only the plans for the California and Illinois parks proceeded, while the flagship Marriott theme park slated for the Maryland and Virginia area was cancelled due to local opposition.

The development of the park was led by David Brown, the vice president of Marriott's theme park division, while veteran theme park designer Randall Duell was the leader of the park's design team. Duell created two nearly identical plans for the Illinois park and its sister park in Santa Clara, California. With an overarching Americana theme in mind, Marriott's designers traveled across the country, observing styles and collecting artifacts to help inform an authentic atmosphere.

Instead of utilizing a spoke-hub design found at other theme parks, the park was designed on Duell's original park layout design named the "Duell loop," a circular path that allowed guests to visit each themed area while employees can work out of sight in the middle of the park. The original six themed areas of the park would be:

The original themed areas of Six Flags Great America
- Carousel Plaza: the main plaza entrance for the park
- Orleans Place: representing Southern United States in the mid-1800s
- Yankee Harbor: a 19th-century New England port
- Yukon Territory: resembling a town in the Canadian Yukon
- The Great Midwest Livestock Exposition at County Fair (also referred to as Midwest County Fair): themed on a 20th-century rural county fair
- Hometown Square: based on early 20th century small towns of the Midwest

Marriott selected 600 acres (240 ha) of rural land in Gurnee, Illinois, straddling Interstate 94 on August 22, 1972. The land was chosen for its location between Chicago and Milwaukee and direct access to Interstate 94. Purchasers of the land were not revealed to the public during that period, but the Chicago Tribune speculated a new theme park for the land. Marriott then officially announced the Gurnee theme park on January 29, 1973. Of the 600 acres (240 ha) of land, the theme park would reside on the 200-acre (81 ha) plot of land east of Interstate 94.

At the time, Gurnee was a rural village with a population of around 3,300 residents and as a result, the project sparked debate among residents. However, Richard Welton, the then-mayor of Gurnee, supported the project. Marriott received approval from Gurnee's village board in April 1973, but the Illinois State Toll Highway Authority rejected a proposal for an interchange to be built to lead directly into the parking lot in June 1973. An advisory referendum in the fall of 1973 concluded that 7 out of 10 residents approved the theme park.

The groundbreaking ceremony was held on Flag Day, June 14, 1974, with Marriott officials and Mayor Welton taking part in the ceremony. In order to make way for the park's entrance and exit roads, 12 homes were demolished and the street the houses were located on, Pine Street (now Six Flags Drive), was converted into a six-lane road. Construction took two years, involved around 700 workers, and cost US$50,000,000 (equivalent to $282,894,737 in 2025) in total to build the Illinois theme park.

==== 1976–1984: Opening and initial operations ====
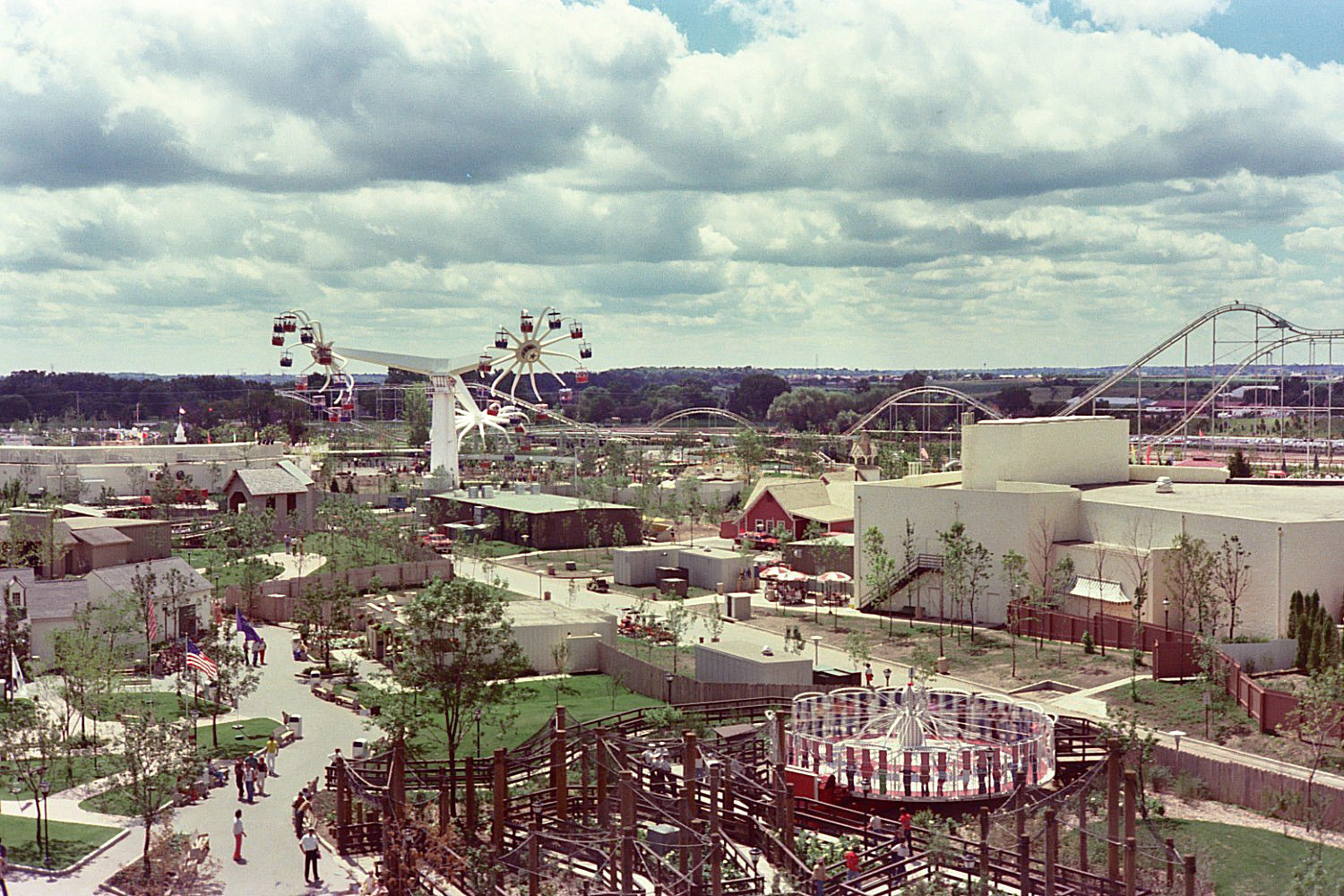
A view of Turn of the Century and Sky Whirl from the Delta Flyer attraction (pictured in August 1976).

The park officially opened on May 29, 1976, two months after the Marriott's Great America in California. At its opening in 1976, Marriott's Great America featured three roller coasters: Willard's Whizzer, Turn of the Century, and The Gulf Coaster. The park had also included other flat rides throughout the park. These attractions included the double-decker Columbia Carousel which is the second-tallest carousel in the world, and the Sky Whirl, a unique, 110-foot-tall (34 m) "triple ferris wheel" custom-designed for Marriott. Transportation rides included Delta Flyer and Eagle's Flight, two one-way gondola sky car rides.

From the beginning, the park made use of the Looney Tunes characters as costumed figures to interact with the park attendees. Each themed area had its own set of costumes for park employees, and the design of buildings, shops and restaurants were all unique to each theme.

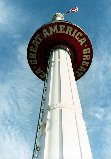
Sky Trek Tower was added in 1977.

The park's second season in 1977 saw the installation of several new rides. The 285-foot-tall (87 m) Sky Trek Tower was built, offering views of the park, Lake Michigan, and the Chicago skyline. A third gondola sky ride, Southern Cross, was added, which offered a round trip and a higher view than the other two gondola rides. A few new spinning rides were added, such as Big Top, Davy Jones' Dinghies, and Hay Baler. The Gulf Coaster was removed for the 1977 season.

Two new attractions were added in 1978. The park's first children's section, named Fort Fun, opened in the section designated the Yukon Territory. Additionally, Great America's fourth roller coaster, Tidal Wave, a Schwarzkopf Shuttle Loop, opened in Yankee Harbor. The Pictorium, an IMAX theatre, opened in 1979, and claimed to have the world's largest screen, at 64.5 by 88.25 feet (19.6 × 26.9 m).

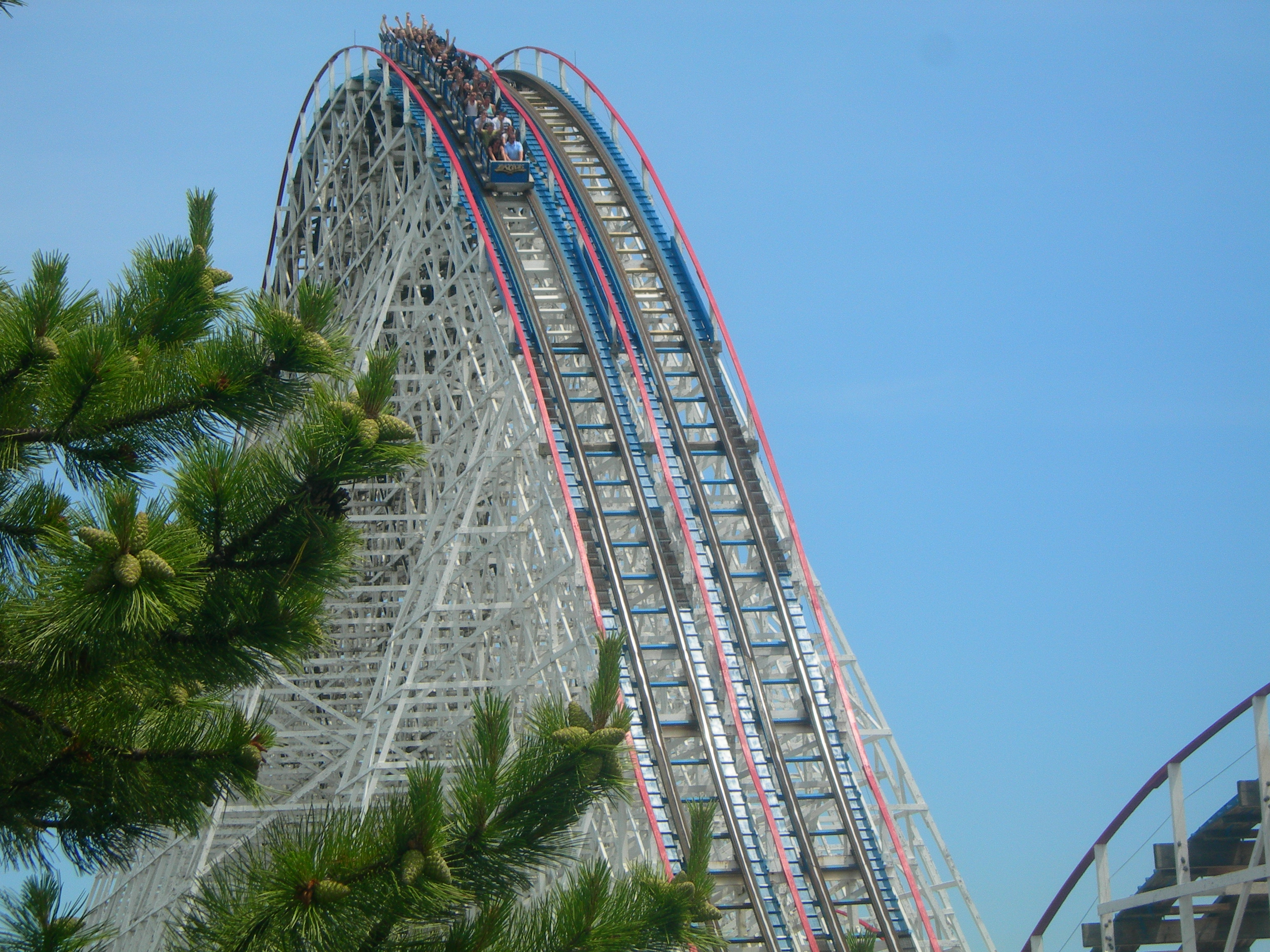
The American Eagle was added in 1981.

The Turn of the Century roller coaster closed and was rethemed in 1980. Two vertical loops were added, along with two tunnels and the ride was re-themed and renamed Demon. The ride featured an original theme song and new demon-themed elements. American Eagle, a racing wooden roller coaster, opened in 1981, exclusive to the Gurnee park. The tracks share a drop of 147 feet (45 m) and reach speeds of 66 mph (106 km/h), totaling 9,300 feet (2,800 m) of combined track. It opened as the tallest, fastest and longest dueling wooden coaster. The Picnic Grove was added in 1982 as a dining and meeting place for group outings. Two entrances for the pavilion would be located between Yankee Harbor and Yukon Territory.

In 1983, two rides were added: The Edge, an Intamin first-generation freefall ride, was added to the Orleans Place section of the park, and White Water Rampage, an Intamin water rapids ride. White Water Rampage was added to Orleans Place, which required the removal of small rides such as Traffique Jam. The Orleans Orbit was moved from its original Orleans Place location to Hometown Square, and became simply The Orbit, taking the spot of the Bottoms Up spinning ride.

=== 1984–1993: Initial operations under Six Flags ===
By the mid-1980s, the Marriott Corporation was disappointed with the financial performance of its theme park division, with lower profits than the company expected, in part because the third and largest of its Great America parks was never realized. As a result, Marriott decided to focus on its lodging and restaurant division and began searching for buyers for its two amusement parks.

In 1984, Marriott sold the California theme park to the city of Santa Clara, California. Around the same time, Bally Manufacturing—the then-parent company of the Six Flags Corporation—offered to purchase the Gurnee park for US$114,500,000 (equivalent to $354,832,639 in 2025) on April 26, 1984. The sale was finalized in May 1984, and as part of the acquisition, Six Flags also acquired the rights to use the Looney Tunes characters at all of its other parks. By the time Marriott sold the parks, the company had invested $200 million into both theme parks. The park was renamed Six Flags Great America for the 1984 season. After the 1984 season, the park's gondola rides, Eagle's Flight and Delta's Flyer, were removed.

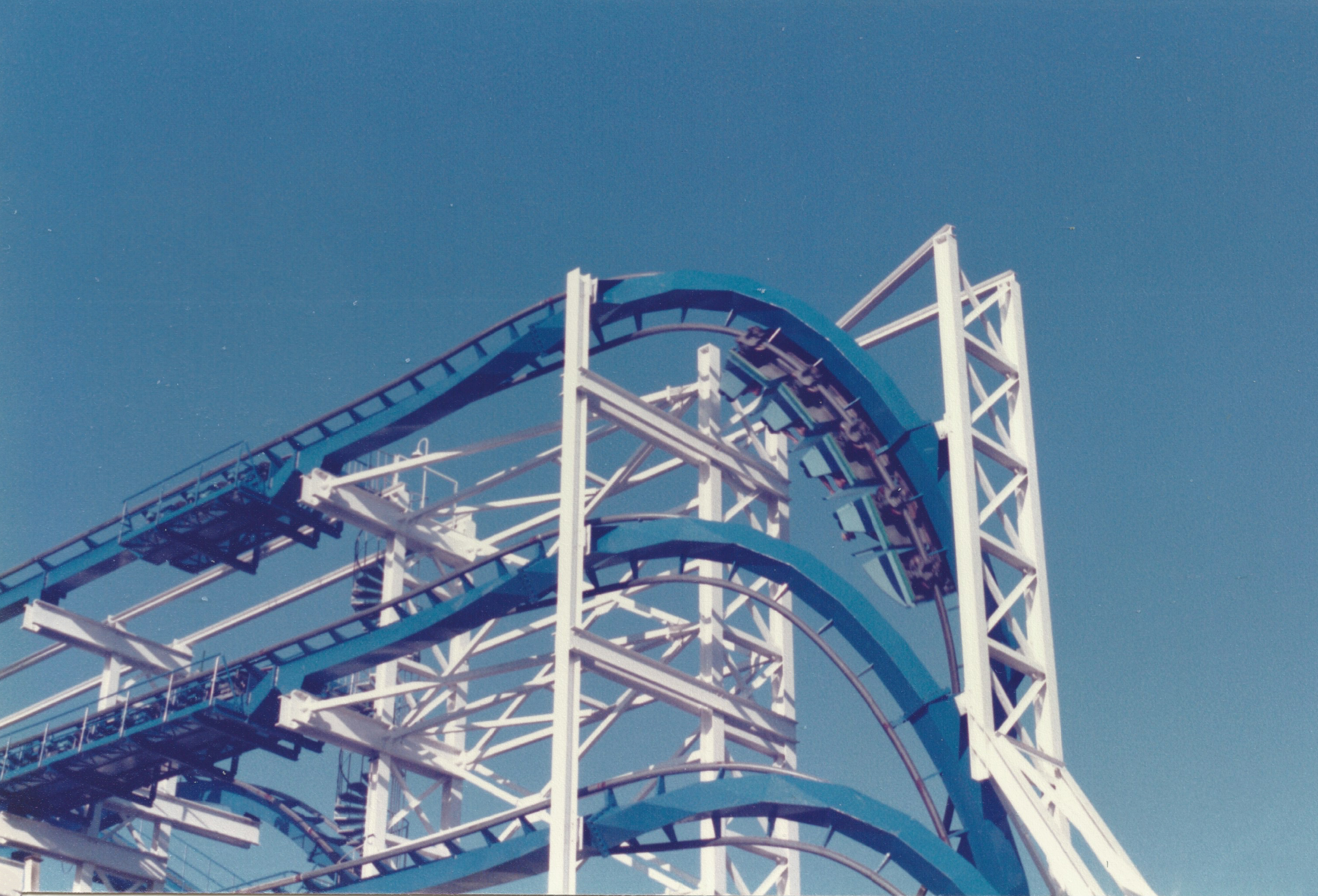
Z-Force operated from 1985 to 1987 in the County Fair area.

In 1985, Six Flags added Z-Force to the County Fair area, a one-of-a-kind Intamin space diver roller coaster. The Edge was removed in 1986. In 1987, the park received one new ride and a themed area expansion. Power Dive, an Intamin Looping Starship ride was added. It was a ride swung back and forth before eventually rotating a complete 360 degrees a few times. Additionally, the Bugs Bunny Land kids area was expanded. Z-Force was removed from Six Flags Great America after the 1987 season, two years after it first operated. It was relocated to Six Flags Over Georgia.

While operating the Six Flags chain, Bally found that the excess resources demanded and high seasonal fluctuations of the theme park business made it an unnecessary burden on its core interests. In 1987, Bally sold Six Flags to Wesray Capital Corporation and a group of Six Flags managers. Several acquisitions were re-sold or closed, while Wesray moved the company's focus from theming to major attractions. This ushered in an era of major new rides and roller coasters at Six Flags parks like Great America.

1988 saw the first of the new coasters, with the addition of the roller coaster Shockwave, an Arrow Dynamics mega-looper, opening in Orleans Place section of the park on June 3, 1988. Shockwave was the world's tallest roller coaster at the time it opened. In 1989, the park received an Intamin Bobsled roller coaster named Rolling Thunder. The ride was a relocation of Six Flags Great Adventure's Sarajevo Bobsled, which closed at that park the year prior. Rolling Thunder was added between Demon and Whizzer.

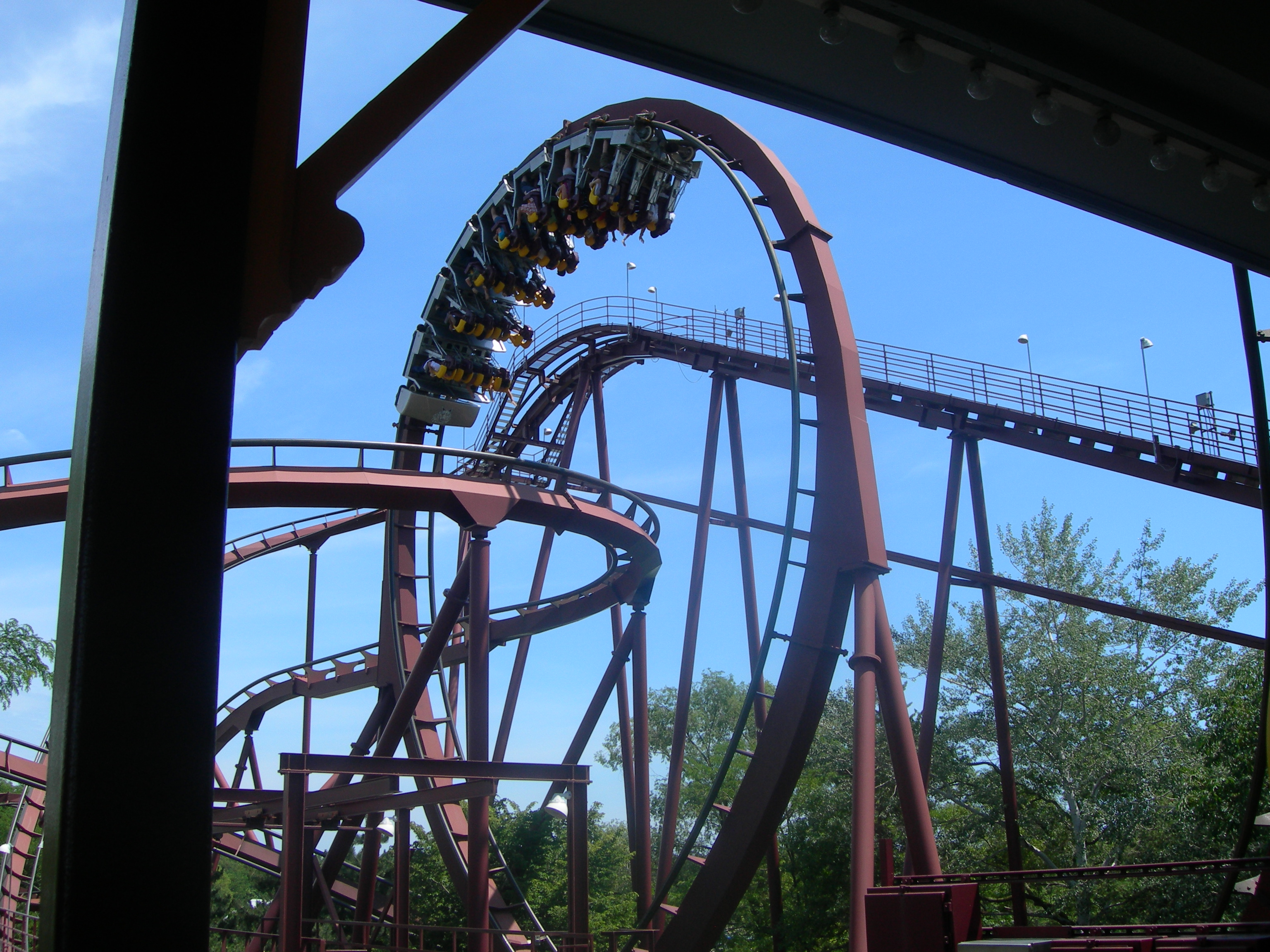
Iron Wolf is the first roller coaster manufactured by Bolliger & Mabillard (B&M), where it operated at the park from 1990 to 2011.

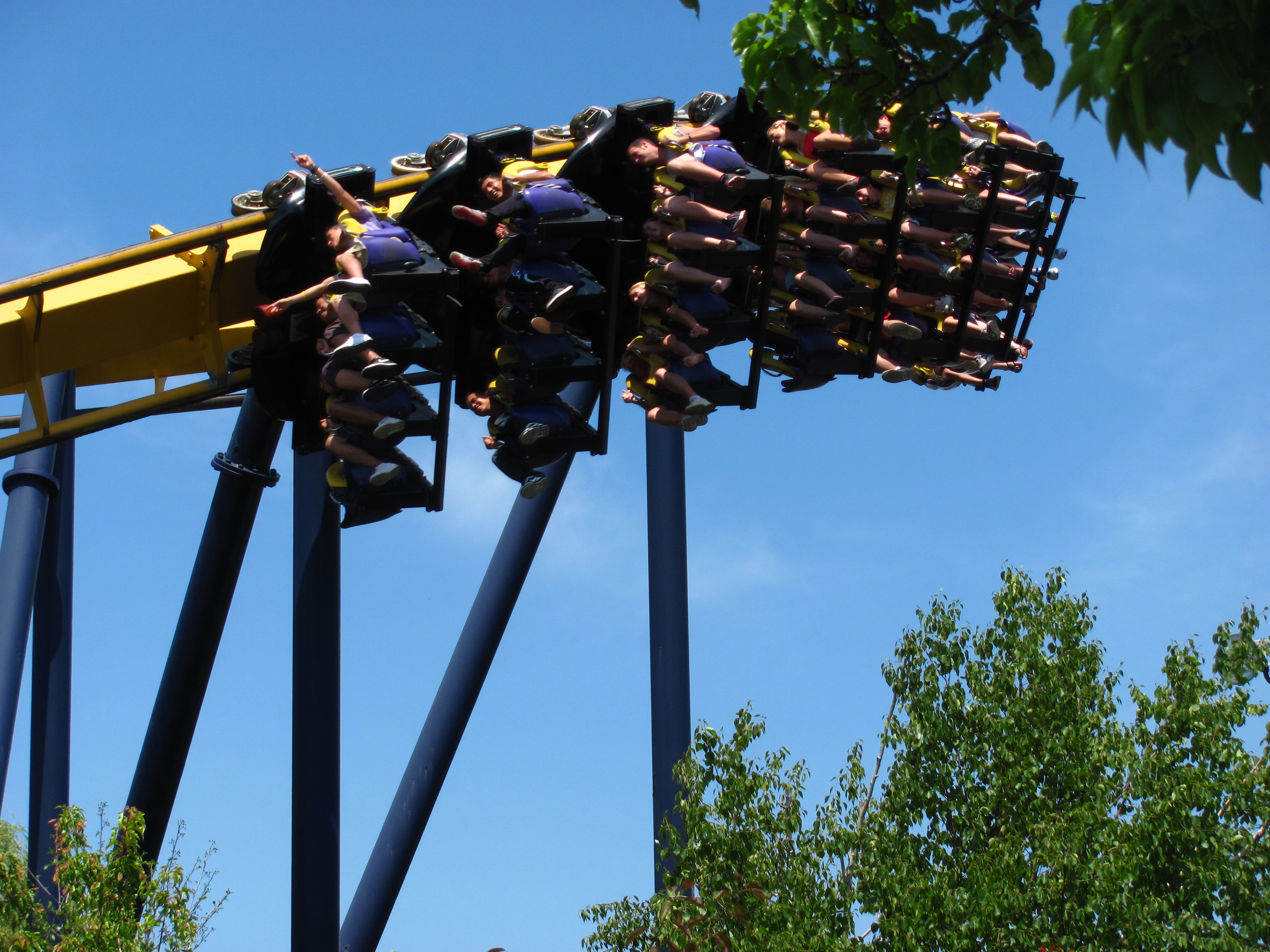
Batman: The Ride is the first inverted roller coaster in the world and B&M's second roller coaster.

Iron Wolf, a compact steel stand-up coaster, opened on April 28, 1990. It is best known for being the first roller coaster manufactured by Swiss manufacturer Bolliger & Mabillard. It opened on Z-Force's former spot in County Fair. In the following year, Condor was added to Orleans Place in 1991, next to Shockwave. Two rides closed for 1991: the spinning ride Yukon Yahoo, which was located in the Yukon Territory section. The other was the shuttle loop coaster Tidal Wave in Yankee Harbor, where it was relocated to Six Flags Over Georgia.

The park collaborated with Bolliger & Mabillard again to build the first inverted roller coaster in the world, named Batman: The Ride. The ride, which opened on May 9, 1992, was met with positive reception and lines that stretched out of the ride area and across large parts of the park. At the time, it was the largest single investment on an attraction, at a cost of US$7 million. The surrounding area of Yankee Harbor was re-themed after the Batman films, with The Lobster being renamed the East River Crawler. During the following offseason a welding truck parked next to Batman caught fire, leading to minor damages to the ride.

=== 1993–1998: Time Warner ownership era ===
Following the opening of Batman: The Ride and release of the film Batman Returns, the Batman Stunt Show debuted in 1993 in a new amphitheater located past Demon, later known as the Southwest Territory Amphitheater. Six Flags and majority owner Time Warner had debuted The Batman Stunt Show at Six Flags Great Adventure the year prior, with great success. Space Shuttle America, a motion simulator ride, was built in 1994 near Sky Trek Tower.

In 1995, construction began on a new themed area for the park, which would be built in phases. The first phase for the area was the opening of Viper that year, a wooden roller coaster which is a mirror image of the Coney Island Cyclone and themed after a snake oil salesman. It was built next to Rolling Thunder, which was removed later that same year to make room for the new area, where it was relocated to The Great Escape in New York.

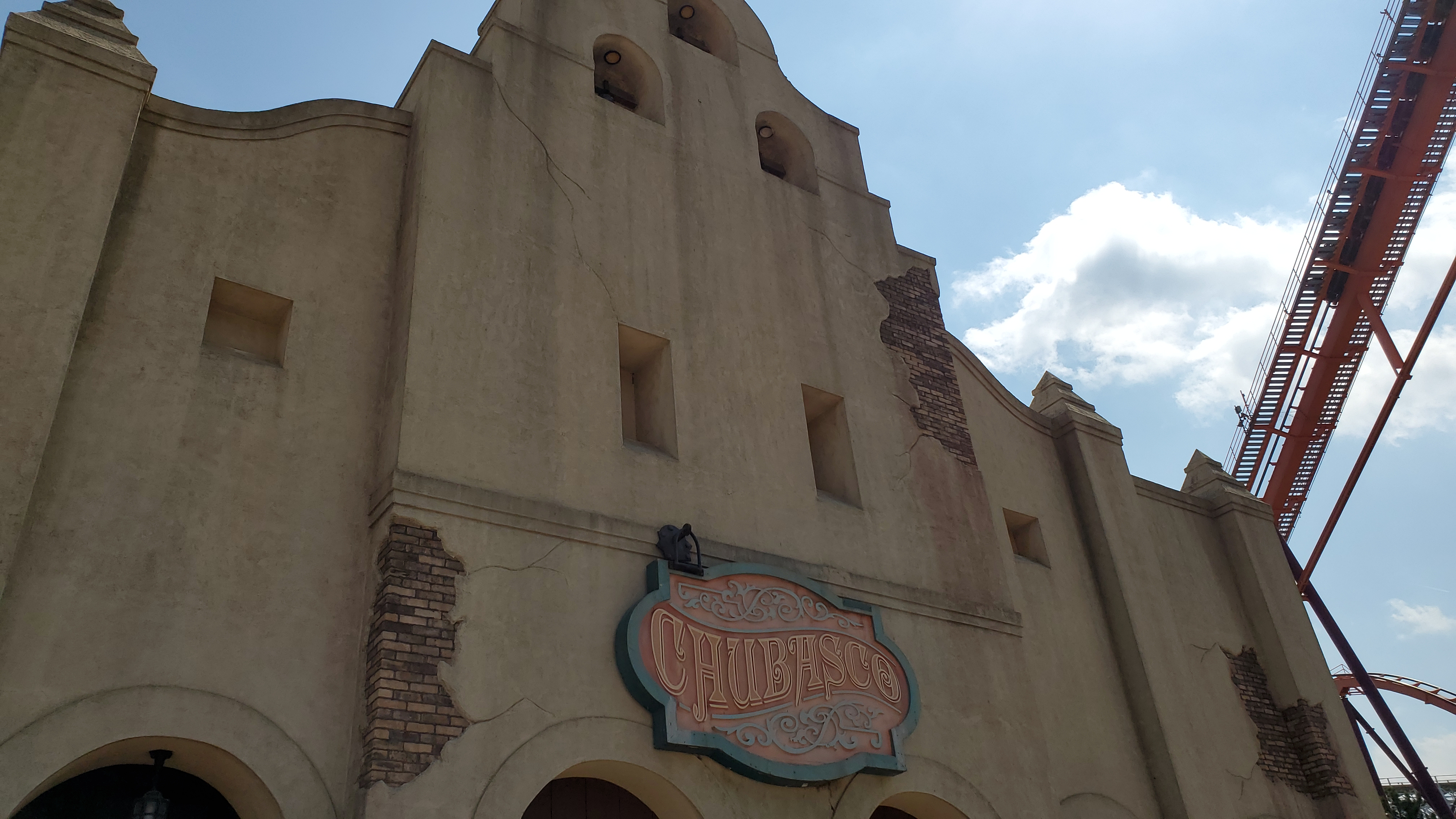
The mission building is the centerpiece of Southwest Territory. It features the Chubasco ride.

Southwest Territory officially opened as the new 11-acre (4.5 ha) themed area in 1996, with a desert theme based on the Old West as part of the second phase, following Viper. Three new rides were added in the themed area: River Rocker, a pirate ship ride; Chubasco, a teacup ride; and Trail Blazer, a Zamperla Joker. The amphitheater that has previously been home to the Batman Stunt Show was renamed the Southwest Territory Amphitheater.

In May 1996, Six Flags Great America made preliminary plans with the village of Gurnee to build a water park on a plot of land located outside of the park's existing plot: across Interstate 94 and west of the theme park. However, these plans were described as "extremely premature" by a spokesperson for the park, stating that plans might not proceed.

=== 1998–2000: Premier Parks acquisition and ownership period ===
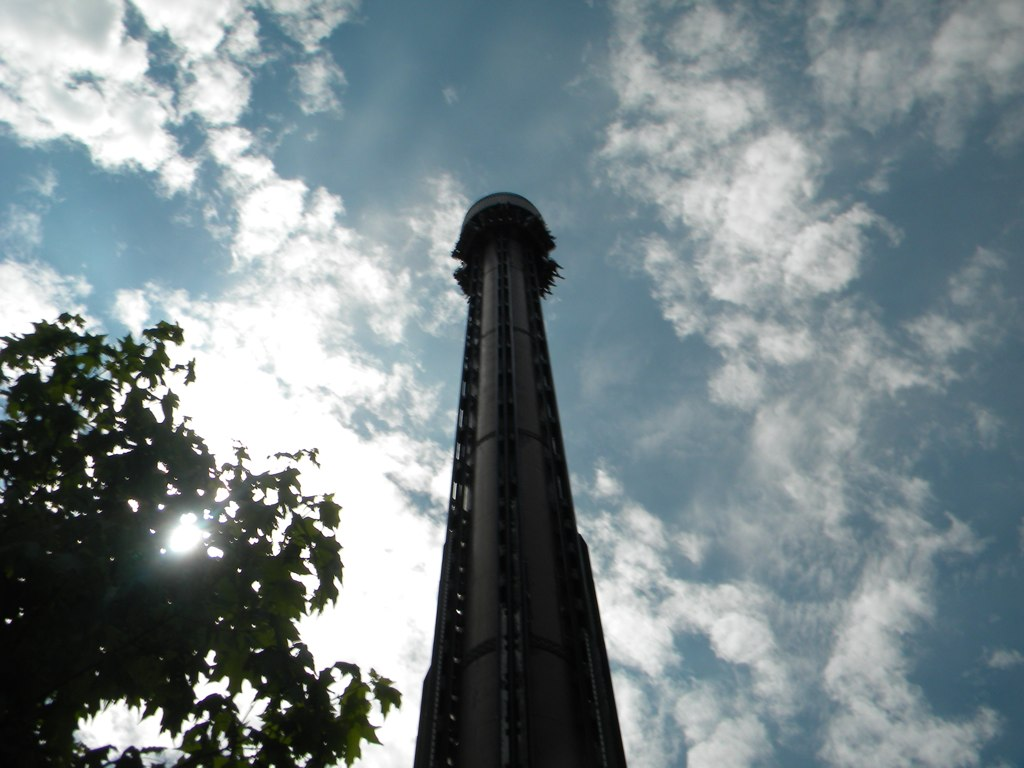
At 227 feet (69 m), Giant Drop is one of the tallest rides at the park.

Two new thrill rides were added to the park for the 1997 season. Giant Drop, a 227 feet (69 m) tall Intamin second-generation drop tower, was added as an expansion to the Southwest Territory area, and was themed to be an ore excavator in the fictional Loco Diablo Mine. The other ride, Dare Devil Dive, was a Skycoaster ride and would be located in the County Fair area. Both attractions opened on April 26, 1997. By this time, construction on the back side of the Southwest Territory mission building was fully completed.

Additionally, the park had also made plans to build a 225-foot (69 m) tall "Wilderness-themed" roller coaster near the Iron Wolf roller coaster, requesting a zoning variation from the village of Gurnee, Illinois. On June 25, 1997, the park informed the zoning board of Gurnee that it would no longer pursue the construction of the Wilderness-themed roller coaster.

The park's preliminary water park plans were expanded into a larger project. In November 1997, the park announced plans to build and open a resort complex called Six Flags Entertainment Village, which would feature a water park, hotel, shopping mall, and a theater. Similar to the preliminary water park plans, it would not be built on the park's existing plot, and instead would be built on the plot of land owned by Six Flags across Interstate 94 and west of the existing theme park. While the complex received approval from the village of Gurnee in late-1998, more than half of residents voted against it on an advisory referendum in 1999, derailing the project.

Despite the park's struggles with the Entertainment Village project, the theme park continued to expand. In 1998, the park expanded its kids areas offerings. A new kids area named Camp Cartoon Network opened as an area within Yukon Territory featuring five new rides. Additionally, the park's existing Bugs Bunny Land was renamed Looney Tunes National Park.

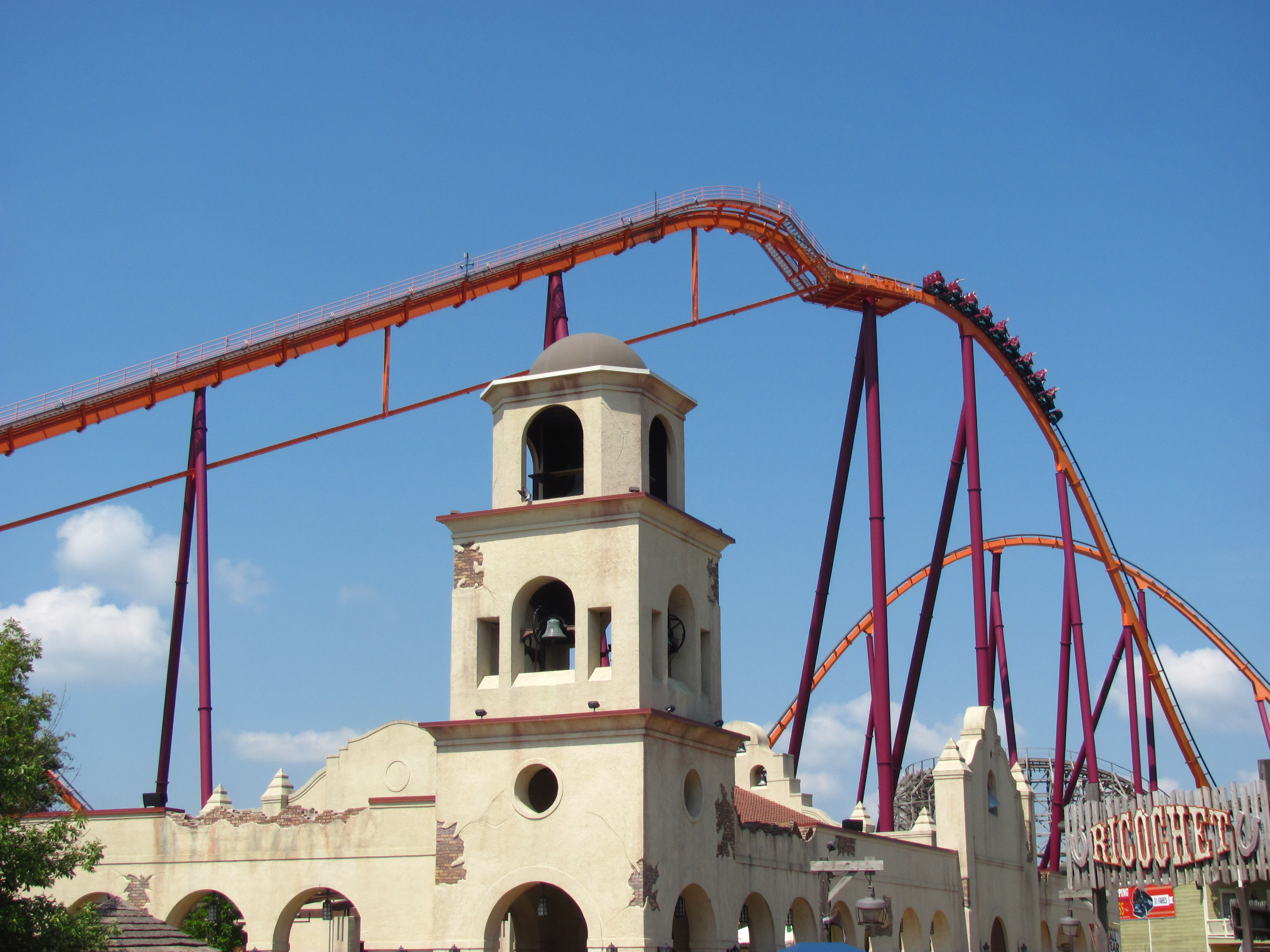
The lift and drop of Raging Bull.

On October 21, 1998, the park announced that it would open Raging Bull for the 1999 season, a hyper-twister roller coaster that was to be added to Southwest Territory. A US$25 million project, Raging Bull was the park's most expensive roller coaster. Built by Bolliger & Mabillard, the roller coaster was designed to be 202-foot-high (62 m), 73 mph (117 km/h), and 5,057-foot-long (1,541 m), and would be built on the former lot used by Rolling Thunder. The roller coaster opened on May 1, 1999, following 40,000 man-hours of work.

=== 2000–2024: Legacy Six Flags era ===
The park celebrated its silver (25th) season in 2000, which led to the additions of new shows and parades to celebrate the anniversary. 2000 was the last year for the Sky Whirl and the Hay Baler ride. An accident involving 2 guests occurred on the Cajun Cliffhanger ride in July 2000, which led to its removal the following year. Additionally, the park's owner Premier Parks would rebrand itself as Six Flags, Inc. on July 5, 2000.

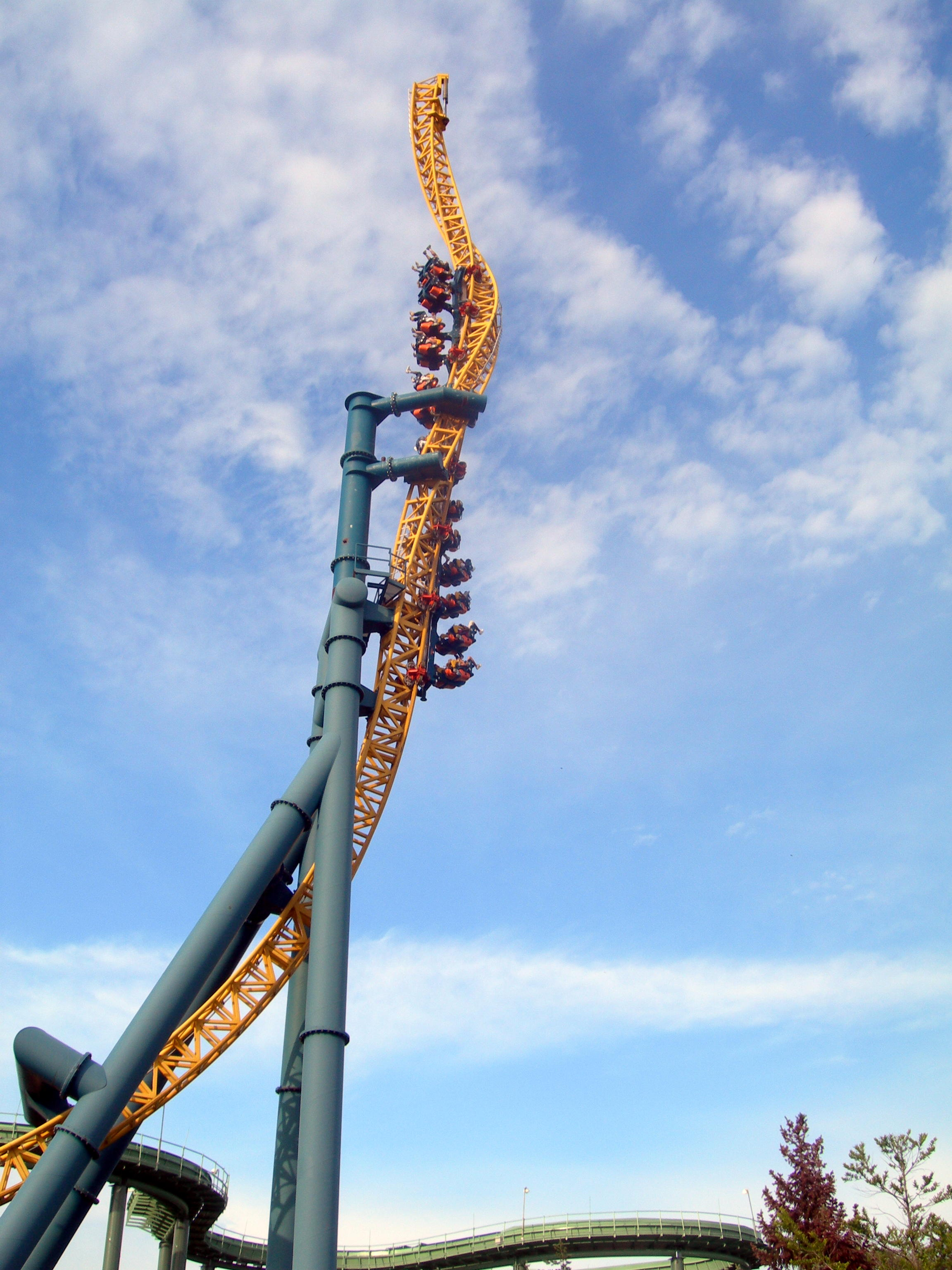
The twisted spike of Vertical Velocity.

In 2001, two inverted shuttle coasters were added: an Intamin impulse coaster named Vertical Velocity (stylized as V^{2}), which opened in Yankee Harbor; and Déjà Vu, a Vekoma Giant Inverted Boomerang ride that replaced Sky Whirl and Hay Baler. In the summer of 2002, plans were announced to remove Whizzer, set to close on August 11. The plan to remove the coaster was met with outrage from park guests, particularly because the intended replacement was a major thrill ride. The backlash led to the park deciding on August 3 to cancel its plans to replace Whizzer, and instead elected to replace Shockwave. Power Dive was also removed, due to maintenance problems.

In 2003, Bolliger & Mabillard constructed Superman: Ultimate Flight in Orleans Place, on the plot of land where Shockwave stood. It was the Midwest's second flying roller coaster, the first being X-Flight at Geauga Lake. The layout of the ride is identical to versions of the ride at Six Flags Great Adventure and Six Flags Over Georgia. Shockwave had partially stood in the parking lot, and for Superman, the entire landscaping of the ride area was redone. Additionally, the Ameri-Go-Round carousel in County Fair was removed at the end of the 2003 season.

Mardi Gras, a new themed area, which annexed a portion of Orleans Place, was added in 2004. It was built in the area where Power Dive and Cajun Cliffhanger had stood. A spinning wild mouse coaster named Ragin' Cajun was added, along with a HUSS Top-Spin model named King Chaos, a Zamperla Rockin' Tug model named Jester's Wild Ride and a Zamperla Balloon Race model named Big Easy Balloons. The same year, the removed Ameri-Go-Round from County Fair was replaced by Revolution, a HUSS Frisbee ride from Six Flags Great Adventure. Batman: The Ride would also be repainted after the 2003 season, changing from an all-black color scheme to yellow track and dark purple supports.

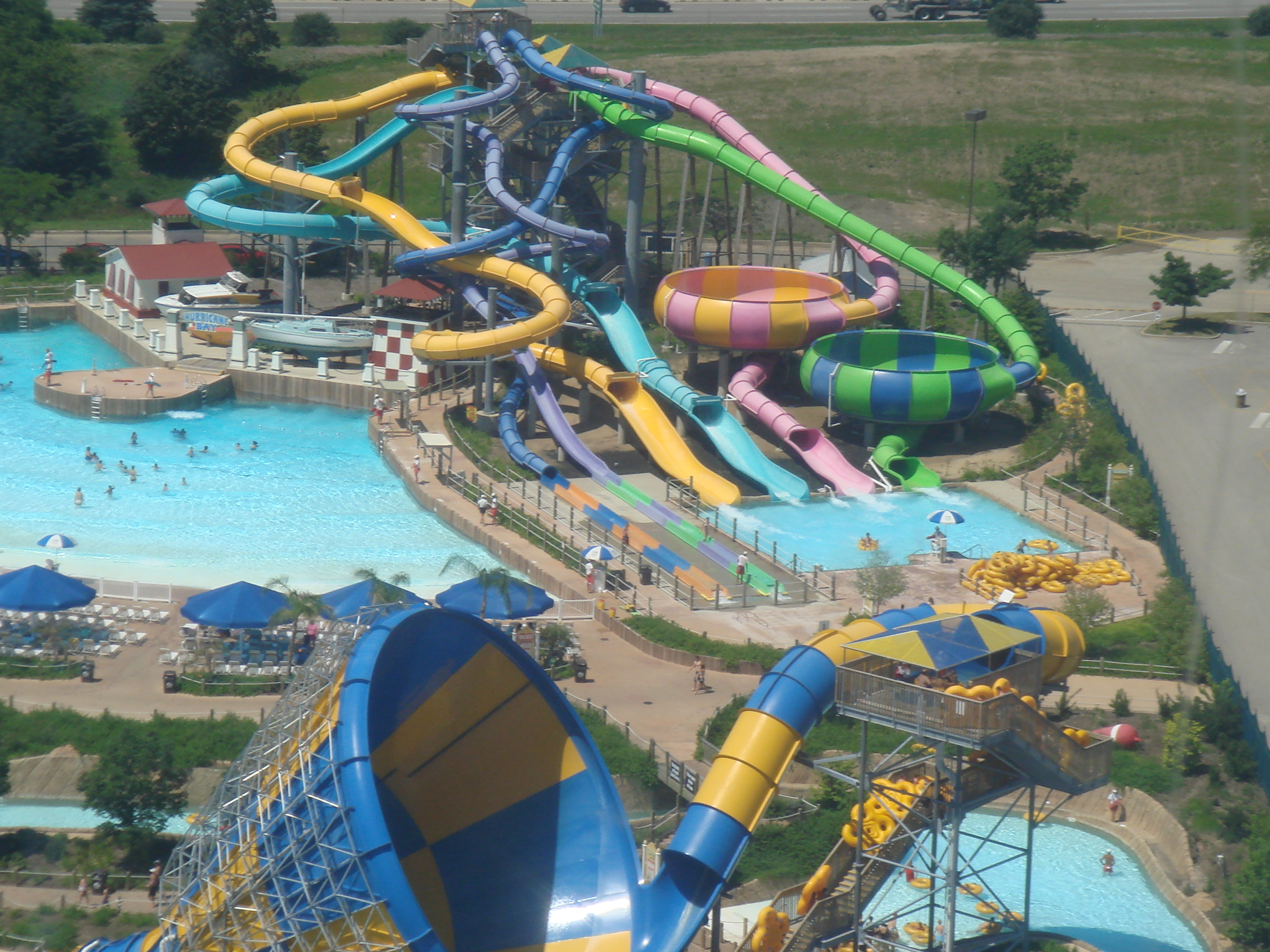
Hurricane Harbor opened in 2005 as a US$42 million expansion to Six Flags Great America.

On September 17, 2004, the park announced a US$42 million expansion to the theme park with the addition of the Six Flags Hurricane Harbor water park. It would become the seventh Hurricane Harbor water park to open, and would be built on the park's preexisting land, on the far west parking lot behind Raging Bull and Viper. Upon its opening, it would feature 25 water slides, a 500,000 gallon wave pool, and an interactive water structure, with water park admission included with a theme park ticket. Groundbreaking began in November 2004. Six Flags Hurricane Harbor opened to the public on May 28, 2005.

In 2006, chief marketing officer of Six Flags, Hank Salemi, became the park's president. The tented area in front of the American Eagle was converted into Wiggles World in 2007, a third children's area themed after the Wiggles, featuring five new rides. American Eagle's entrance was relocated to the right of the tent, utilizing part of the entrance building for the adjacent Dare Devil Dive skycoaster to accommodate the Wiggles area. Additionally, the park focused on entertainment, introducing a new stunt show, Operation SpyGirl, in the Southwest Territory Amphitheater. Operation SpyGirl was an original live-action production created by Joel Surnow, co-creator of the Fox television series 24. Operation SpyGirl debuted in May, and closed for the season in August. Operation SpyGirl did not return in 2008.

Great America added The Dark Knight Coaster in 2008, an indoor Mack wild mouse roller coaster themed after the film and located in Orleans Place. The ride is located indoors, mostly in the dark, and has a storyline based around Batman and The Joker. The Theater Royale was converted into a queue building for the ride. Additionally, Splashwater Falls closed for the 2007 season early on, and was removed in March 2008. For 2009, Six Flags replaced Déjà Vu with Buccaneer Battle, a pirate-themed boat ride in County Fair designed by Mack Rides. The ride consisted of 14 eight-passenger boats navigating a channel 450 feet (140 m) long. During the ride, there are numerous interactive water elements that can be controlled by passersby.

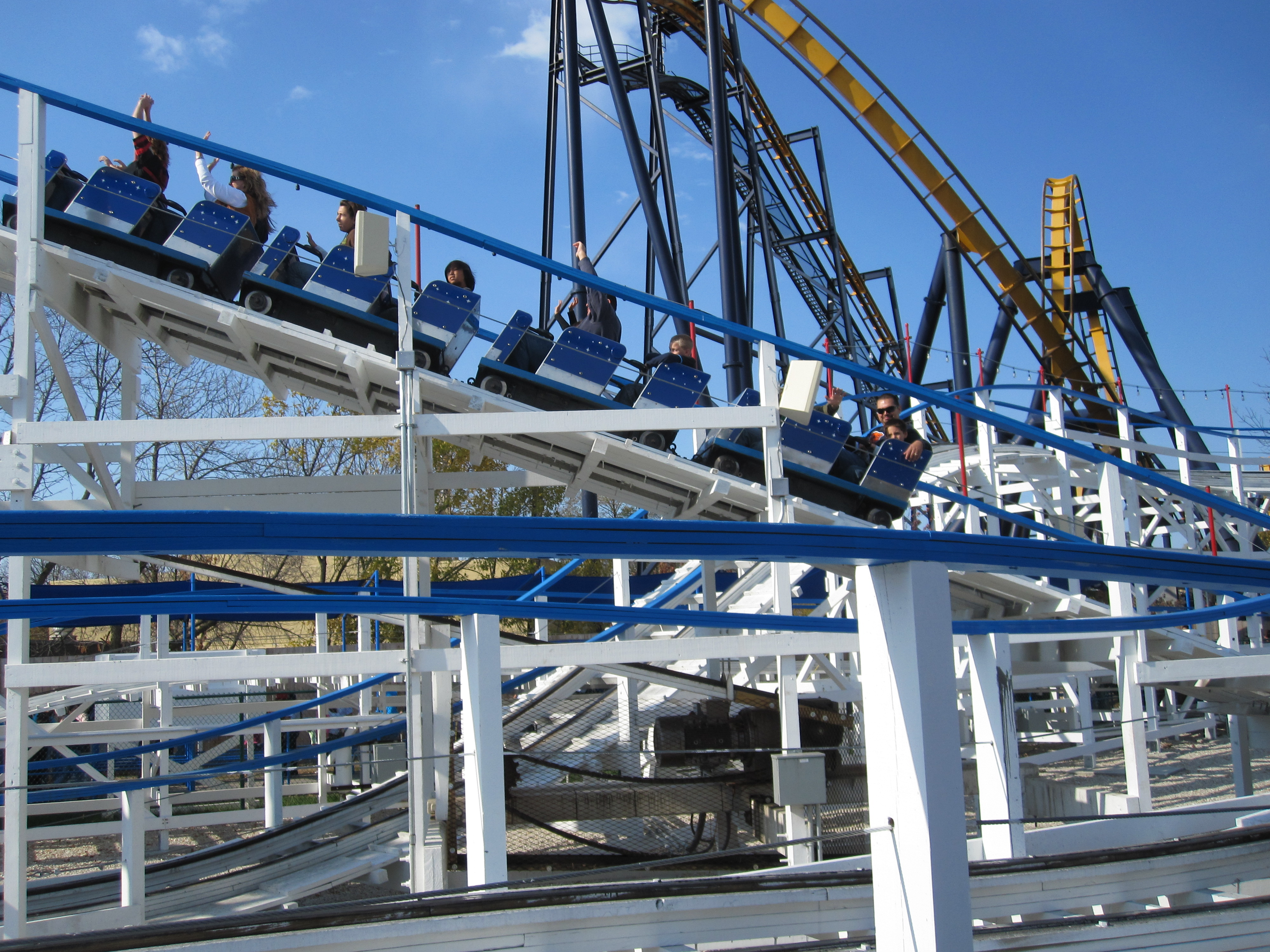
Little Dipper was relocated in 2010 from the defunct Kiddieland Amusement Park.

Six Flags Great America acquired a historic kids wooden roller coaster Little Dipper in late 2009 for US$33,000. It previously operated at Kiddieland Amusement Park, which operated from 1950 until 2009. Little Dipper opened at Six Flags Great America in mid-2010. Plans to relocate Chang, a stand-up roller coaster from Six Flags Kentucky Kingdom began in May. It was planned to be built on the former Space Shuttle America site, near the park's front entrance. It received preliminary approval from the zoning board of Gurnee to exceed its 125-foot (38 m) height restrictions and advanced to the village board for approval. However, the park withdrew these plans in July. Instead, the park opted for an expansion in the adjacent Hurricane Harbor water park. By the end of 2010, Six Flags began removing some licensed properties from concessions and attractions. The Wiggles World area had its branding and theming removed for 2011.

On September 1, 2011, the park announced X-Flight, a B&M Wing Coaster, to open for the 2012 season, and was the first announced Wing Coaster to be built in North America. The ride would replace Splashwater Falls and Great America Raceway. A few days later, the park's B&M stand-up roller coaster, Iron Wolf permanently closed on September 5, and was relocated to Six Flags America soon after. X-Flight opened for the media on May 10, 2012, and opened on May 16, 2012. The nighttime show, IgNight – Grand Finale, was announced on August 12, 2012, to open for the following year in 2013. The show would be held in Hometown Square.

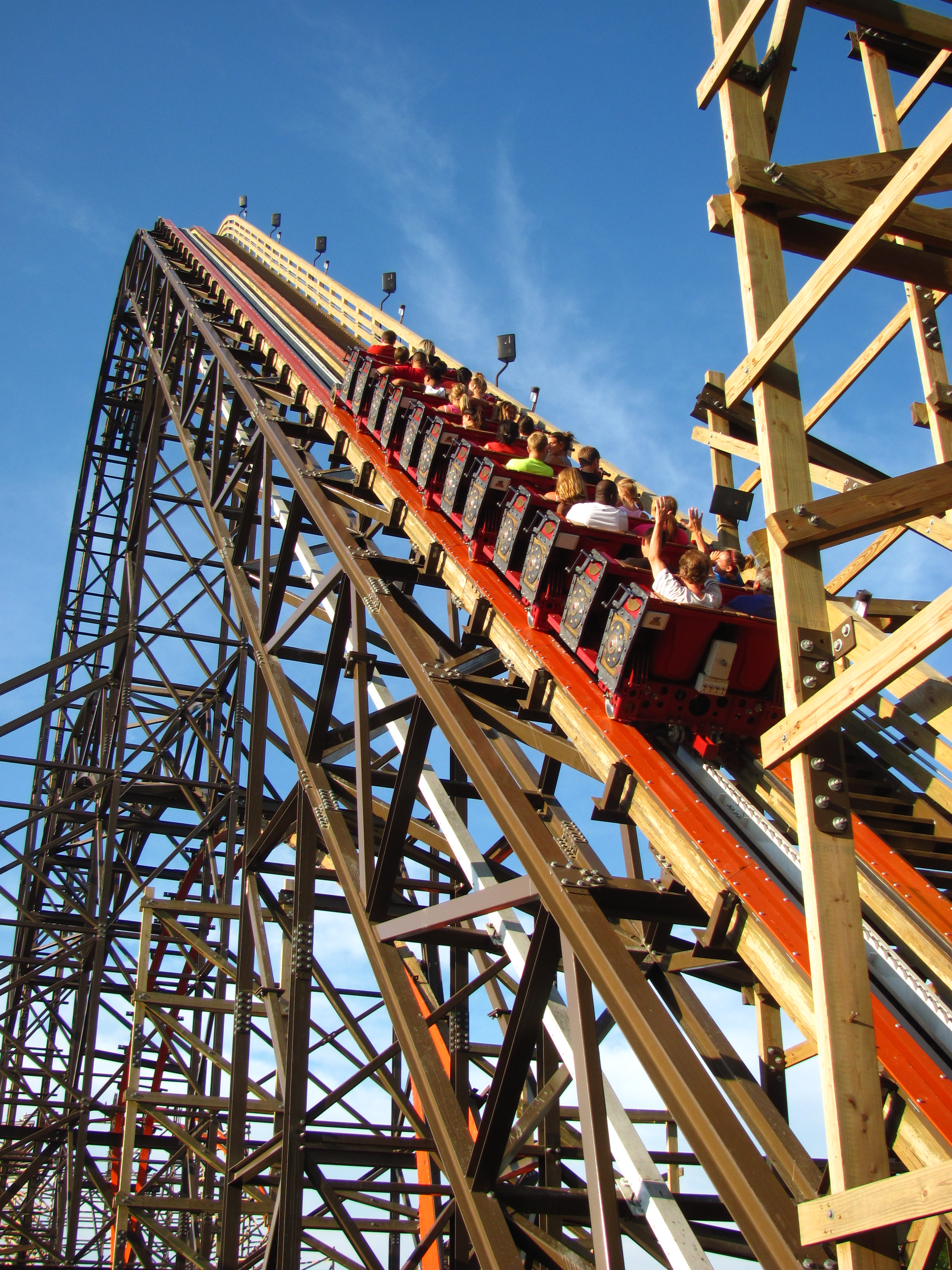
Main climb of Goliath

Goliath, a Rocky Mountain Construction wooden roller coaster, was announced on August 29, 2013, built on the plot of Iron Wolf. It was announced as the steepest, longest, and fastest wooden roller coaster in the world. Goliath debuted on June 19, 2014. Later that year, the park announced its plans to celebrate its 40th season of operations for the 2015 season, named the "40 Seasons of Thrills." As part of the celebrations, the park re-introduced three kids rides in a new section called Hometown Park, which would be located within the Hometown Square area. Additionally, the Columbia Carousel and Hometown Square was refreshed.

An interactive dark ride named Justice League: Battle for Metropolis was announced on September 1, 2015, to open the following season. It would be one of three Six Flags parks to debut the attraction for that season, and would replace the Southwest Territory Amphitheatre. Justice League: Battle for Metropolis soft opened on May 26, 2016, and opened on May 28. The Orbit, an original park attraction, closed on August 6. The Joker, an S&S 4D Free Spin roller coaster, was announced on September 1, 2016, and would open for the 2017 season in the Yankee Harbor area. To accommodate The Joker, two rides would be either relocated or removed. East River Crawler would be relocated to replace The Orbit, restoring its original name The Lobster, and the Jester's Wild Ride would permanently close.

Virtual reality headsets were added to the park's Giant Drop attraction, and would be renamed temporarily to Drop of Doom. The new experience opened on April 29, 2017. The Joker opened to the public on May 27, 2017. King Chaos closed on August 26, 2017. Shortly after, it was announced on August 31, 2017, an unnamed Larson Fire Ball attraction would open for the 2018 season, replacing King Chaos.

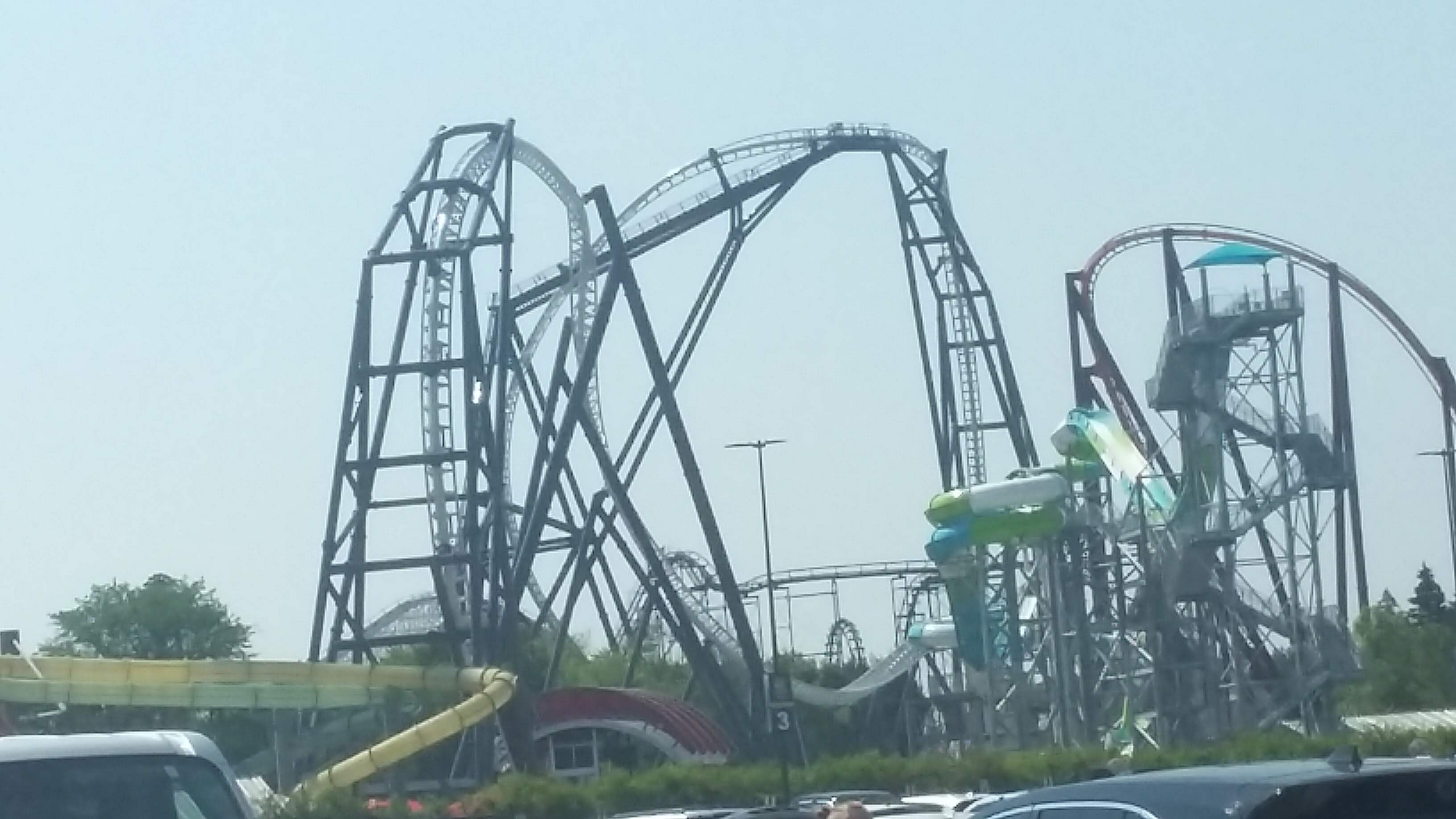
An overview of Maxx Force

On February 14, 2018, the park announced that Mardi Gras Hangover would be the name for the upcoming Larson Fire Ball attraction. The Holiday in the Park event was announced two months later, on April 11, 2018, extending the park's operating season to December. It would feature holiday lights, shows, and some attractions would operate. The park's Pictorium IMAX theater was demolished in late-April for future expansion. Mardi Gras Hangover opened to the public on May 22, 2018. The park announced an S&S air-compressed launch roller coaster named Maxx Force on August 30, 2018, and would debut for the 2019 season, replacing the Pictorium. Maxx Force opened for the media on July 2, 2019, and officially opened on July 4.

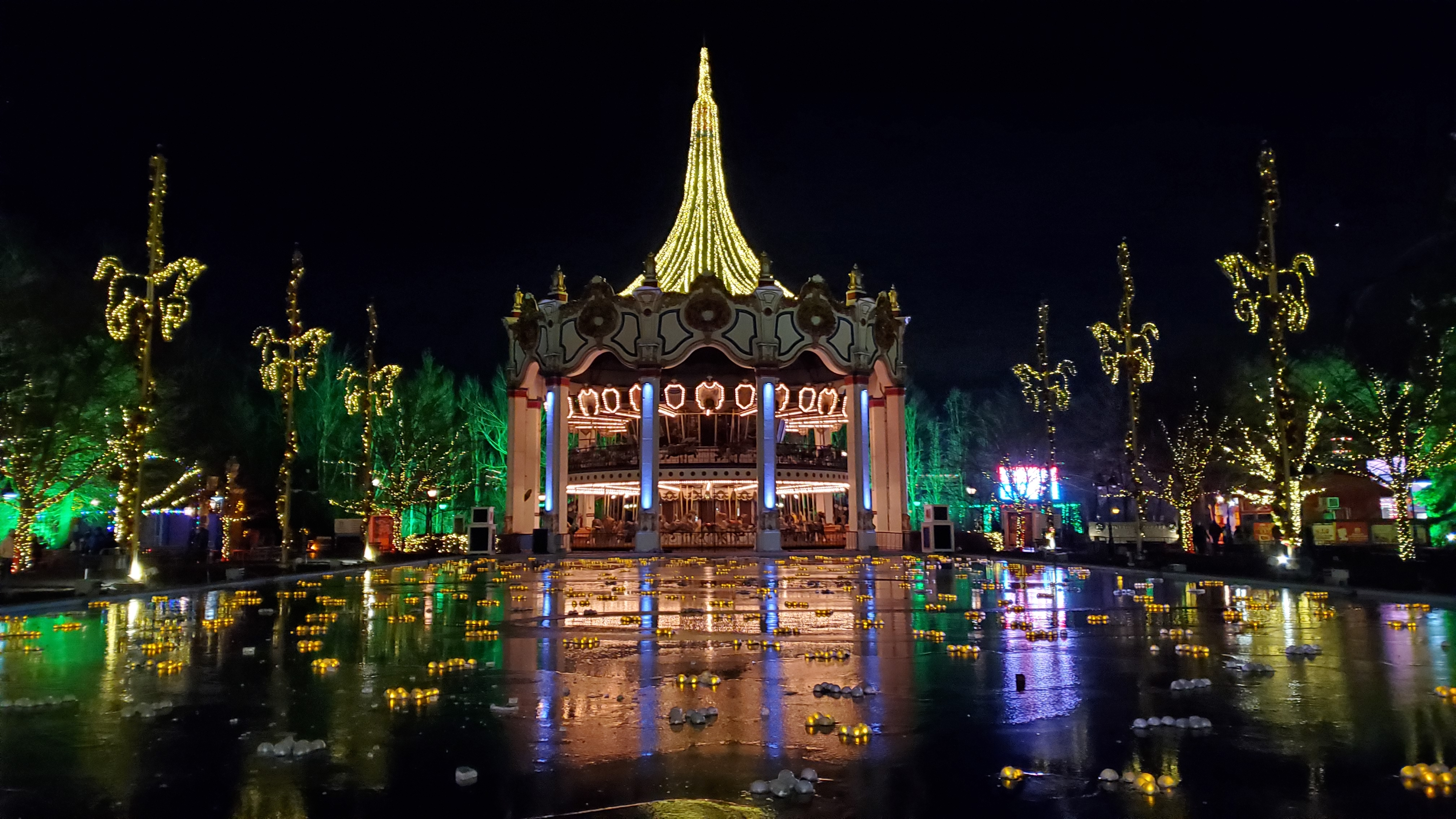
Holiday in the Park Lights debuted in 2020 as a modified version of the original event before it was removed altogether after the 2021 season.

Due to the COVID-19 pandemic, the park did not open in 2020. While Hurricane Harbor reopened in July 2020, the Lake County Health Department deemed a reopening of the amusement park as "unlikely" because of the ongoing pandemic. In November, a modified version of its holiday event debuted, named Holiday in the Park Lights. It would run similar to the regular event, but without any rides operating.

In the following year, it was announced the adjacent water park would become a separately gated water park and would be renamed Hurricane Harbor Chicago on March 22, 2021. It was also announced that the amusement park would reopen in late-April 2021, and the water park by the end of May, with restrictions to follow the state's guidelines relating to the COVID-19 pandemic.

In early 2022, director of marketing John Krajnak was named the new park president of Six Flags Great America, following the death of president Hank Salemi in January. Two months later, DC Universe, a DC Comics themed area, was announced on March 24, 2022, featuring new building paint, wider paths, and re-themed rides. Three rides would be re-themed: Vertical Velocity became The Flash: Vertical Velocity, with a new red color scheme; Whirligig became DC Super-Villains Swing, featuring DC villain visuals; and Yankee Clipper was re-themed to Aquaman Splashdown, featuring new ride boats. While the area was supposed to open on April 15, 2022, the area opened in May 2022 due to supply chain issues. The park also removed Holiday in the Park from its event slate in 2022, shortening its operating season to November.

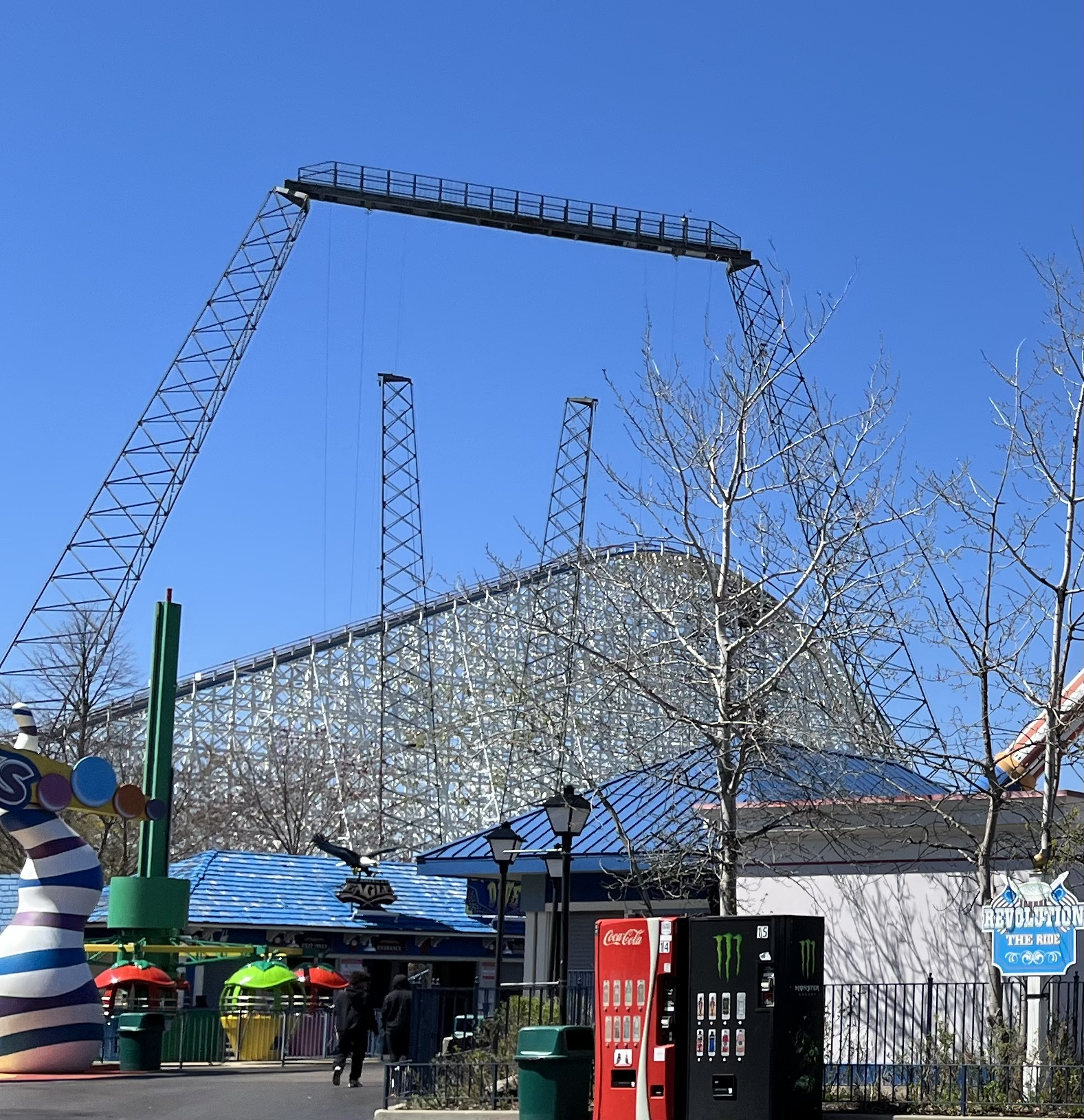
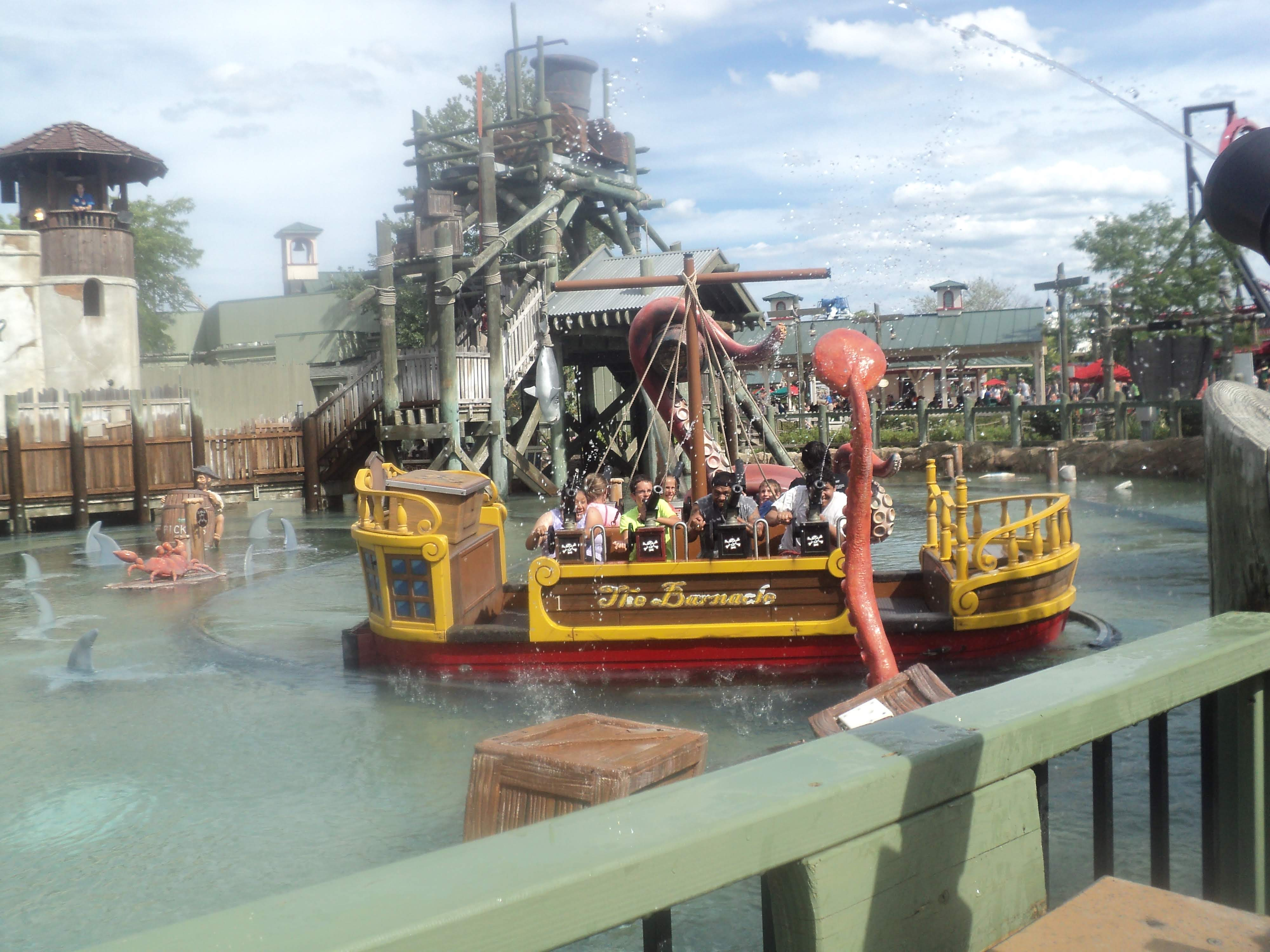
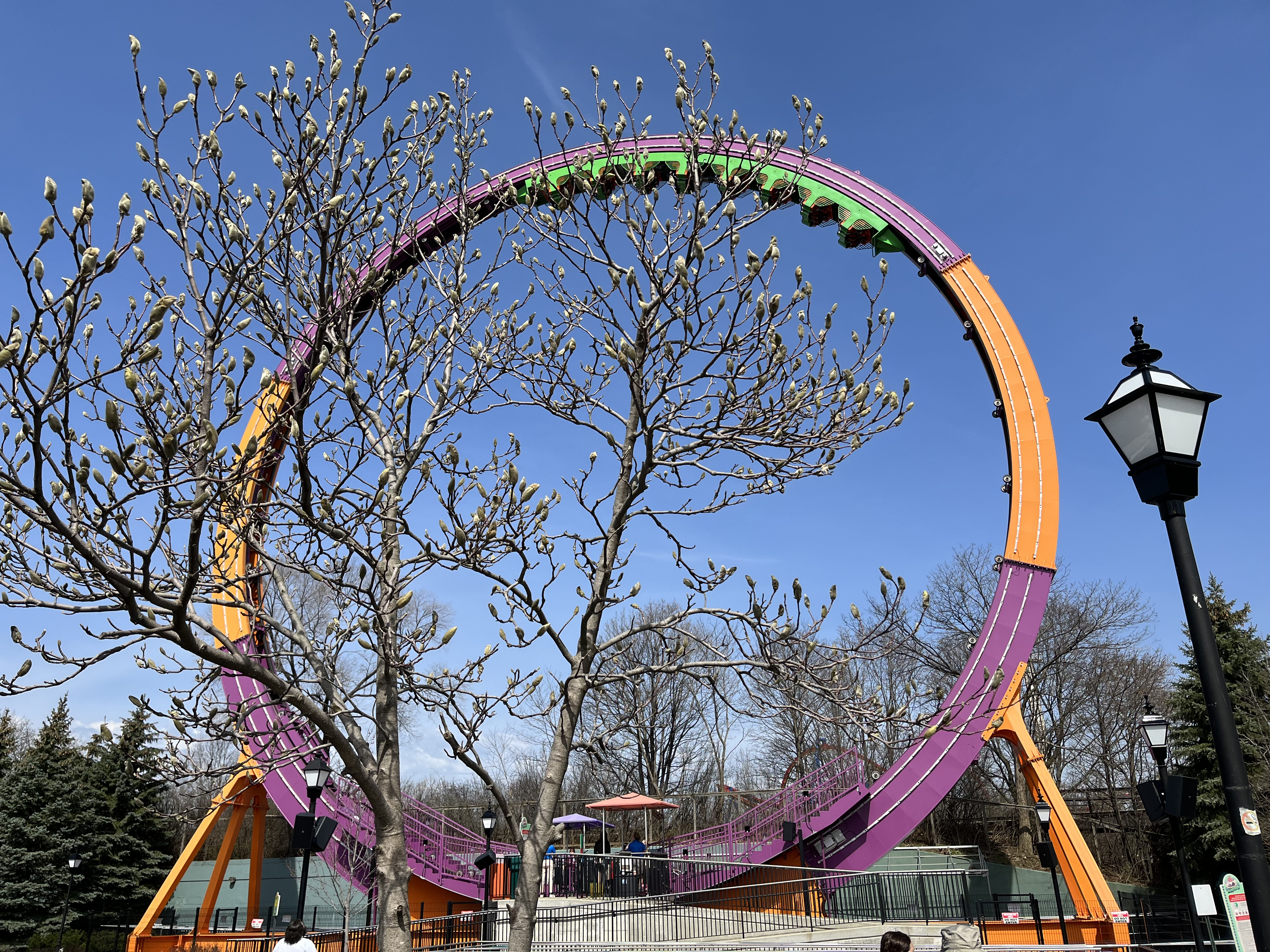
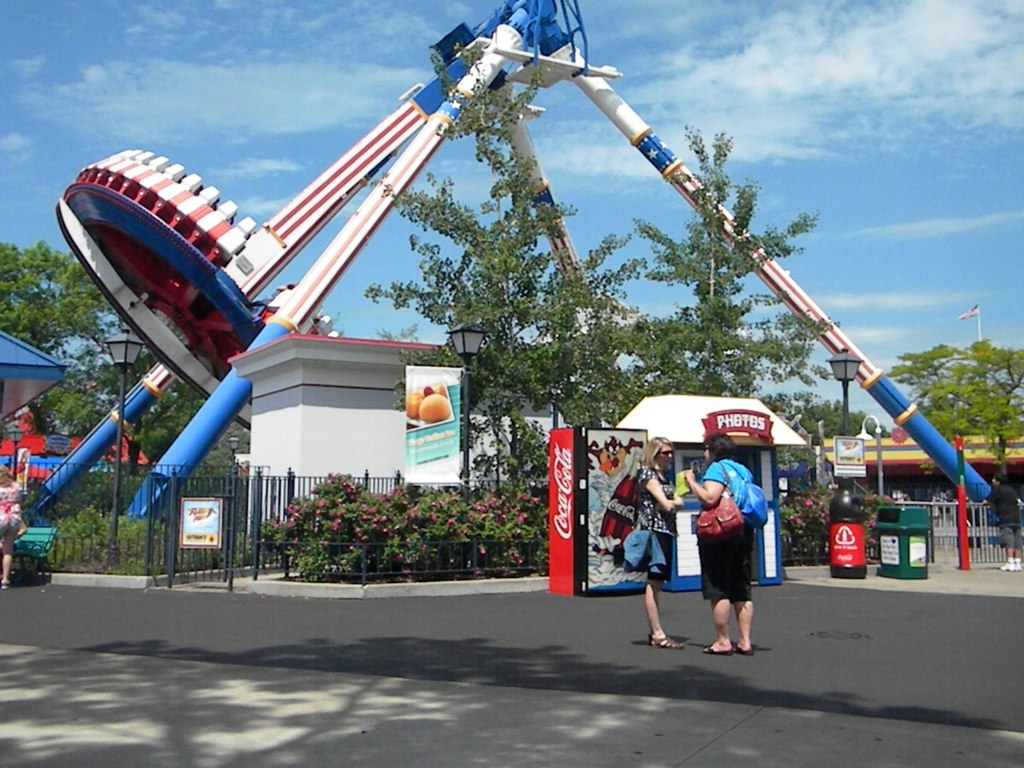
Clockwise from top: Dare Devil Dive, Buccaneer Battle, Revolution, and Mardi Gras Hangover all closed and were removed in the 2023 season.

Throughout the 2023 season, several developments occurred. In April 2023, the park confirmed that the plots of Dare Devil Dive and Buccaneer Battle would be used for future expansion following removal from the park map. Sky Striker, a Zamperla Discovery pendulum ride, was announced on August 30, 2023, planned to open for the 2024 season. It would be built on the plot of land that Dare Devil Dive occupied. Soon after the announcement of Sky Striker, two more rides—Revolution and Mardi Gras Hangover—would be removed from the park. The rides both closed permanently on October 29, 2023, and were relocated to Niagara Amusement Park & Splash World in New York.

In April 2024, the park demolished its old entrance plaza to build a new entrance building. Sky Striker opened to the public in mid-June 2024. Two months later, a B&M Dive Coaster named Wrath of Rakshasa was announced on August 15, 2024. It would be the steepest and feature the most inversions on a Dive Coaster, and would replace the Buccaneer Battle water ride.

=== 2024–present: Post-merger Six Flags era ===
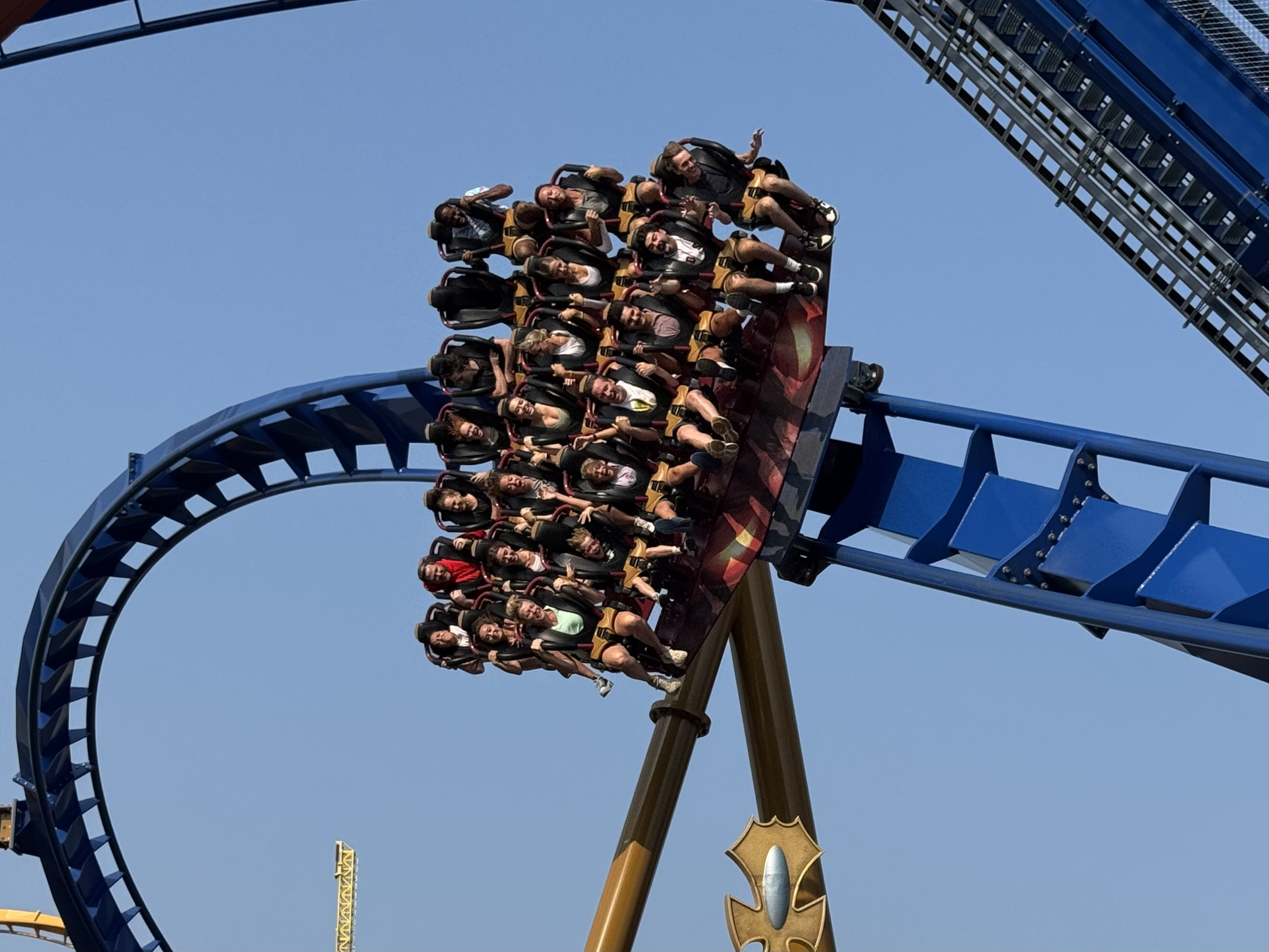
Wrath of Rakshasa opened on May 31, 2025, replacing Buccaneer Battle.

Six Flags Great America's owner Six Flags merged with competitor Cedar Fair in July 2024 into a newly-formed company named Six Flags Entertainment Corporation. Following the merger, it was announced in early November 2024 that Six Flags Great America would receive a new kids area, alongside 50th anniversary celebrations, and park enhancements, as part of the newly-formed Six Flags' $525 million investments for the 2026 season. The kids area would be later delayed to 2027. Wrath of Rakshasa debuted to the public on May 31, 2025, becoming the park's 16th roller coaster. Additionally, park president John Krajnak was moved to a regional general manager position for the Midwest region after Six Flags eliminated the park president role across all parks in May 2025.

The demolition of Winner's Circle Go Karts, park enhancements, and plans for the park's 50th anniversary were announced at the American Coaster Enthusiasts No Coaster Con event on January 17, 2026. In February 2026, it was reported that the Camp Cartoon kids area was demolished and two of its rides—Crazy Bus and Yahoo River—were dismantled. However, the Sprocket Rockets roller coaster was not demolished. John Krajnak returned to his role of park president on April 22, 2026, after Six Flags reinstated the role at 10 parks located in "key markets". An anniversary event named the 50th Anniversary Celebration debuted at the park on June 20, 2026, with extended park hours, a nighttime parade, fireworks, and drone show as well as commemorative experience, running until August 9, 2026.

On August 6, 2026, Six Flags Great America announced Camp Timber Trail, a woodland-themed family area set to replace Yukon Territory in 2027. The area would feature nine total attractions, three of which would be new attractions while four would be rethemed rides, including previously-removed rides Crazy Bus, Yahoo River, and Buzzy Beez. Little Dipper and Logger's Run retain their original names. Sky Hawk, a new Vekoma suspended family coaster, which is the tallest, fastest, and longest family suspended coaster in the Midwest, will headline the area. The area is part of a multi-year transformation of Six Flags Great America, with park enhancements taking place over the next three to five years.

== Geographic location ==
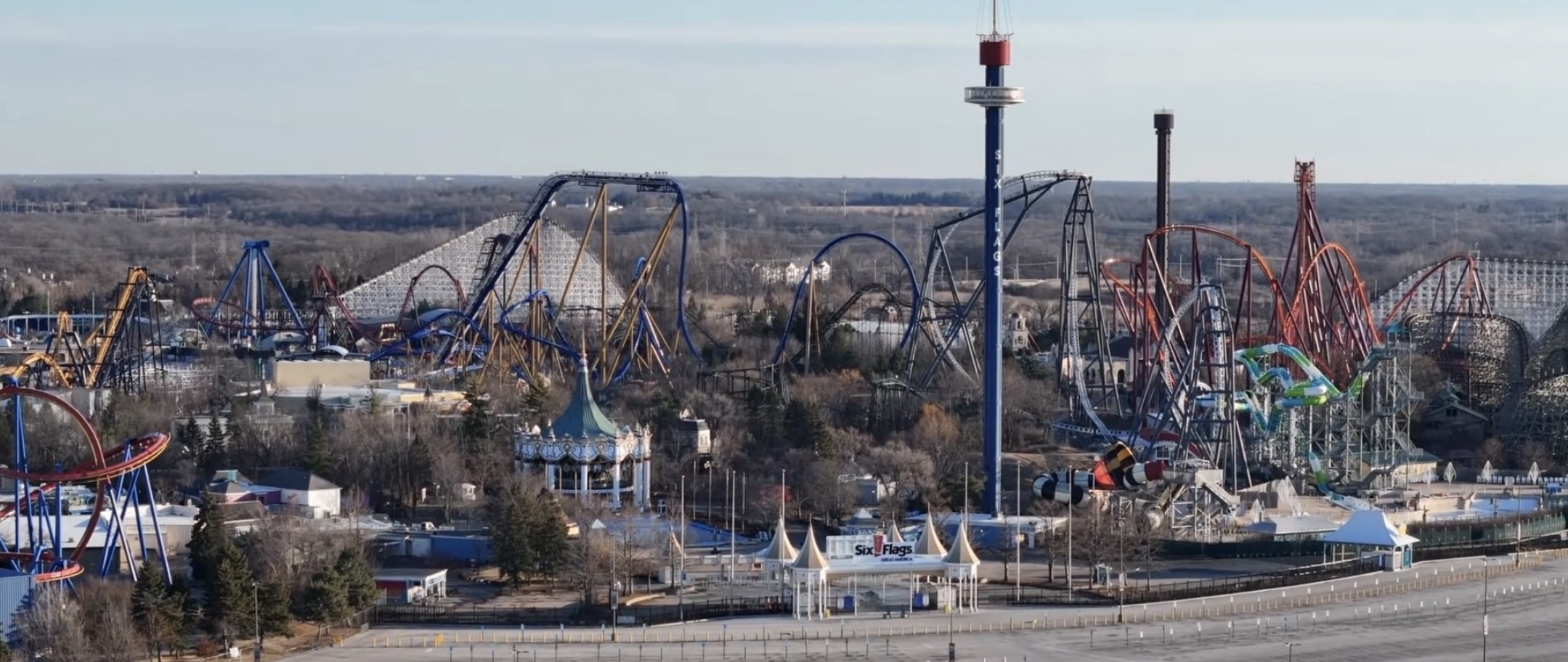
An aerial view of the park in 2026

Regional location of Six Flags Great America located between the Chicago and Milwaukee metro areas.

Six Flags Great America is located in Gurnee, Illinois, U.S., a village in Lake County, Illinois, U.S. It is located between two major United States cities; it is approximately 45 miles (72 km) north of Chicago, Illinois, and 50 miles (80 km) south of Milwaukee, Wisconsin. Additionally, the park is approximately 3 miles (4.8 km) south of the Gurnee Mills shopping center, and 10 miles (16 km) from the Illinois–Wisconsin border.

It is adjacent to the Interstate 94 highway, with Illinois Route 132, Illinois Route 21, and Washington Street directly serving the theme park. The park is accessible via the Pace bus system through routes 565 (Grand Avenue) and 572 (Washington).

The combined property of Six Flags Great America and Hurricane Harbor Chicago is fully owned by Six Flags and covers 305 acres (123 ha). Of the total land area, 30 acres (12 ha) are undeveloped as of 2025. It is the largest amusement park in Illinois.

== Park layout and attractions ==
The layout of Six Flags Great America is designed in a circular layout called a "Duell loop." The loop layout allows guests to visit each themed area by following the park's pathways, while also allowing space for employees and maintenance workers to work out of sight of guests in the middle. The Southwest Territory and Metropolis Plaza themed areas are the only areas located outside of the original loop. As of 2026, Six Flags Great America features 11 themed areas and 16 roller coasters.

- Great America Scenic Railway — a 3 ft (914 mm) narrow-gauge railway attraction, with stations in Hometown Square and County Fair.

=== Carousel Plaza ===
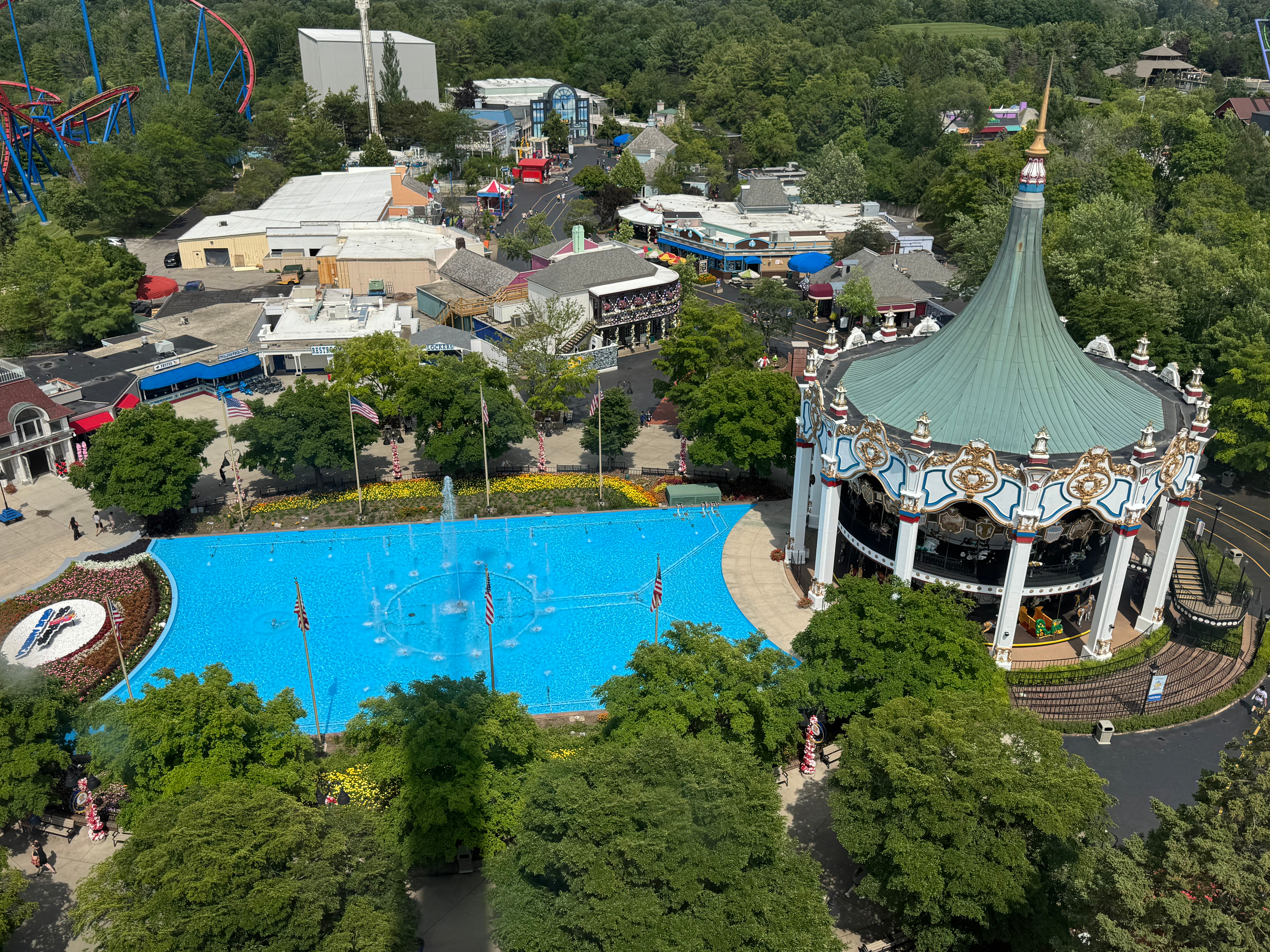
Carousel Plaza in 2026 with the Columbia Carousel

Carousel Plaza is the front entrance area to the park, which centers on the park's Columbia Carousel. In addition to the rides, there are shops and food kiosks themed to the area.

- Columbia Carousel — a 100-foot (30 m) double-decker carousel, opened in 1976.
- Sky Trek Tower — a 330-foot (100 m) gyro tower, opened in 1977.
- Maxx Force — an air-launched roller coaster, featuring five inversions. It opened in 2019, replacing the Pictorium theater.

=== Orleans Place ===
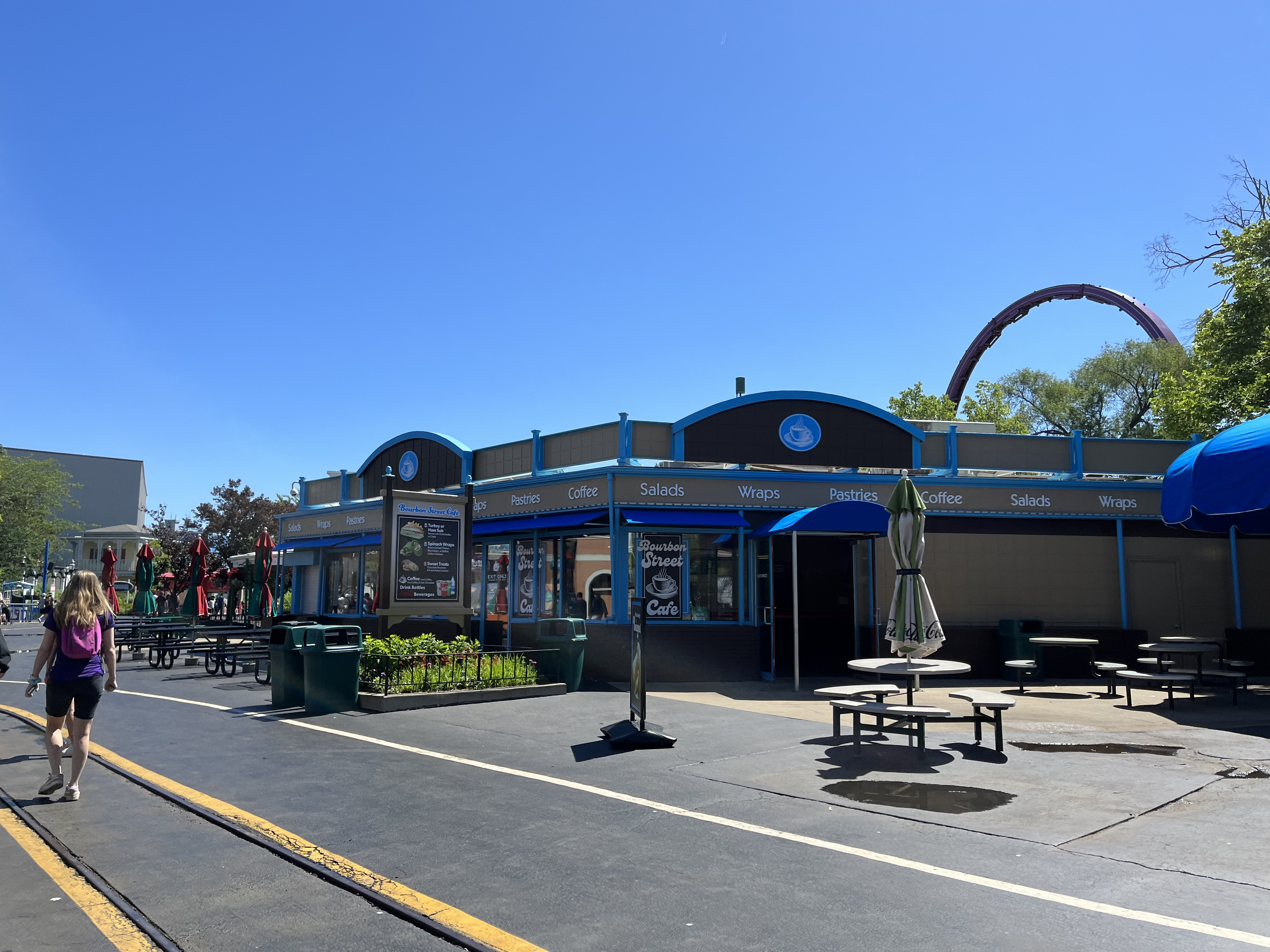
Bourbon Street Cafe, a restaurant in Orleans Place.

Orleans Place is themed around New Orleans in the late 1800s, specifically the historic French Quarter. The area opened as an original area in 1976, and part of the area was later annexed into Mardi Gras in 2004.

Rue Le Dodge is the last original ride from 1976 in the themed area.

- Condor — a Condor spinning aerial ride, opened in 1991.
- Rue Le Dodge — a bumper cars attraction, opened in 1976. It features the largest bumper car floor in the world.
- Superman: Ultimate Flight — a flying roller coaster themed to Superman, opened in 2003.
- The Dark Knight Coaster — an indoor wild mouse roller coaster themed to the 2008 film The Dark Knight, opened in 2008.

=== Mardi Gras ===
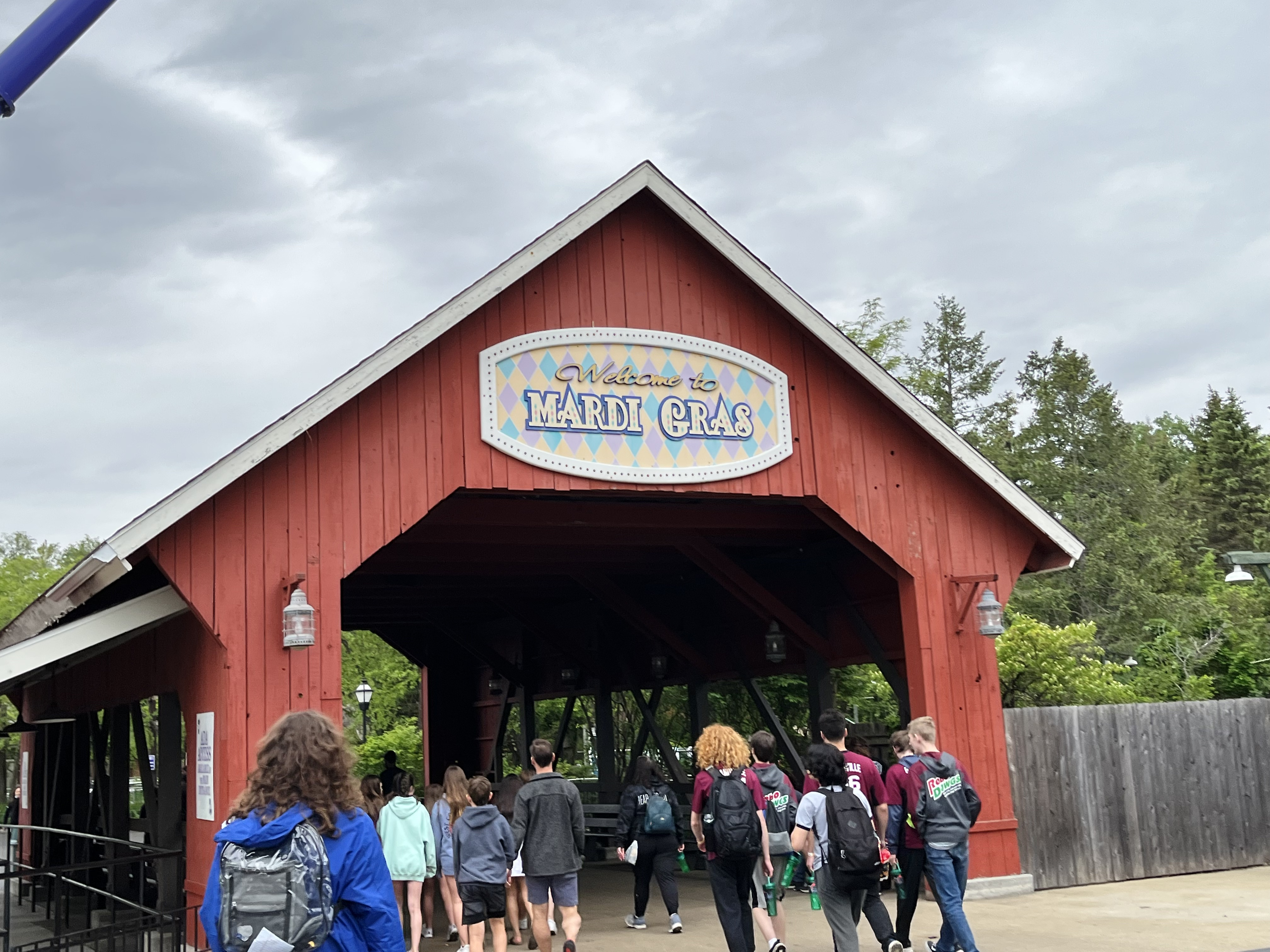
The DC Universe to Mardi Gras entrance portal.

Mardi Gras is one of the park's newest themed areas. It opened in 2004 after being converted from part of Orleans Place. The area's theme comes from the Mardi Gras holiday and specifically the carnival celebration of the holiday in New Orleans.

When Mardi Gras opened, it featured four rides: Big Easy Balloons, a Zamperla "Balloon Race" attraction; King Chaos, a top spin attraction; Jester's Wild Ride, a "Rockin' Tug" attraction; and Roaring Rapids, an Intamin river rapids ride which originally opened in Orleans Place in 1983.

- Big Easy Balloons — a twirling balloon attraction, opened in 2004
- Roaring Rapids — a river rapids ride, opened in 1983

=== DC Universe ===
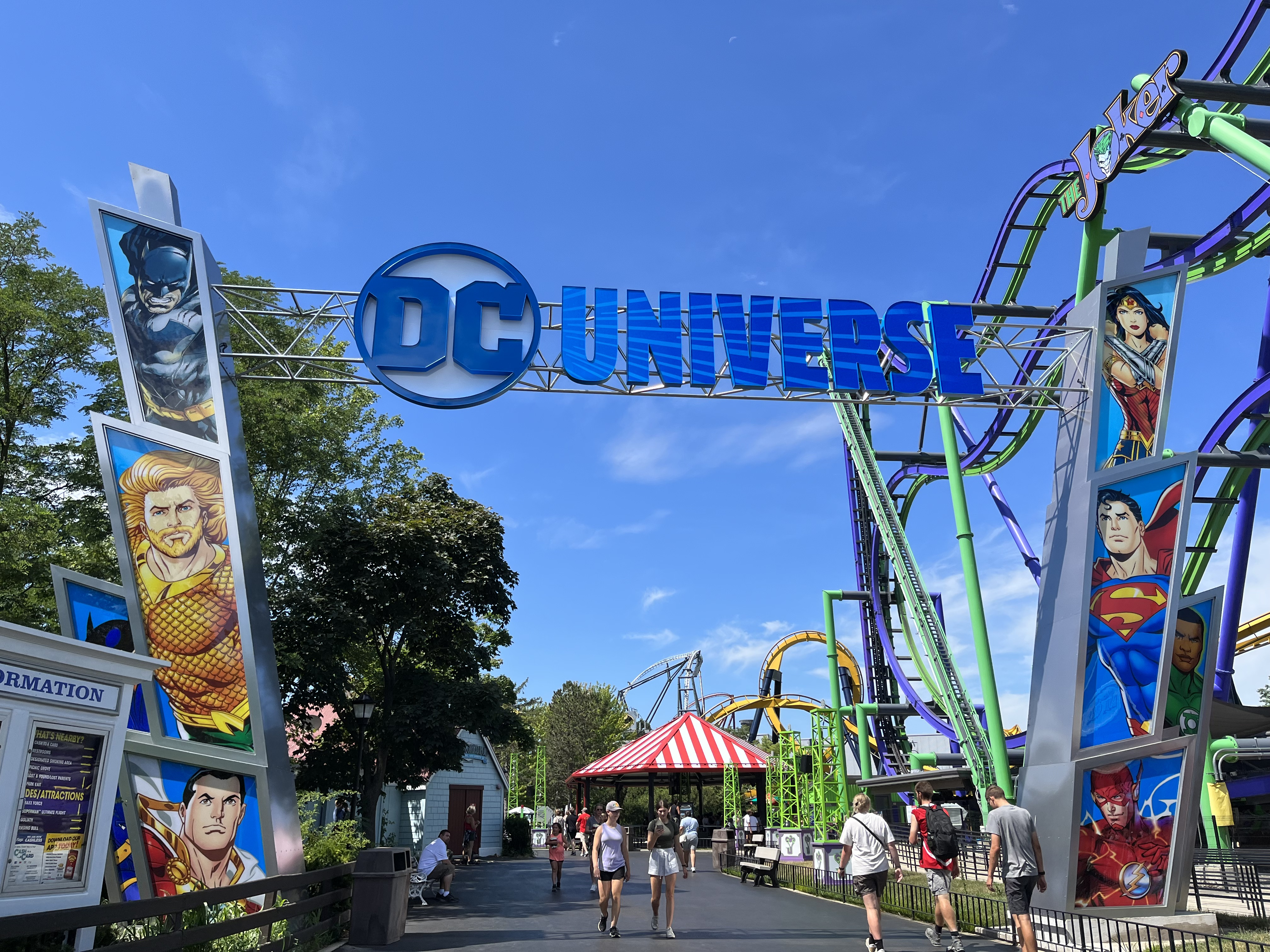
The entrance portal to DC Universe.

DC Universe is the park's DC Comics themed area. Originally opening as Yankee Harbor in 1976 as an original themed area of the park, it was re-themed to DC Universe in 2022.

The area features three roller coasters: Batman: The Ride, The Flash: Vertical Velocity, and The Joker. All attractions within the area share the same name with other Six Flags-owned parks.

- Aquaman Splashdown — a log flume themed to Aquaman that interlinks with Logger's Run; formerly named Yankee Clipper, opened in 1976.
- Batman: The Ride — an inverted roller coaster themed to Batman, which opened as the first-of-its-kind in 1992.
- DC Super-Villains Swing — a swing ride themed to DC Comics villains; formerly named Whirligig, opened in 1976 and relocated multiple times.
- The Flash: Vertical Velocity — an Impulse roller coaster themed to The Flash; formerly named Vertical Velocity, opened in 2001.
- The Joker — a 4D Free Spin roller coaster themed to the Joker, opened in 2017

=== Yukon Territory ===
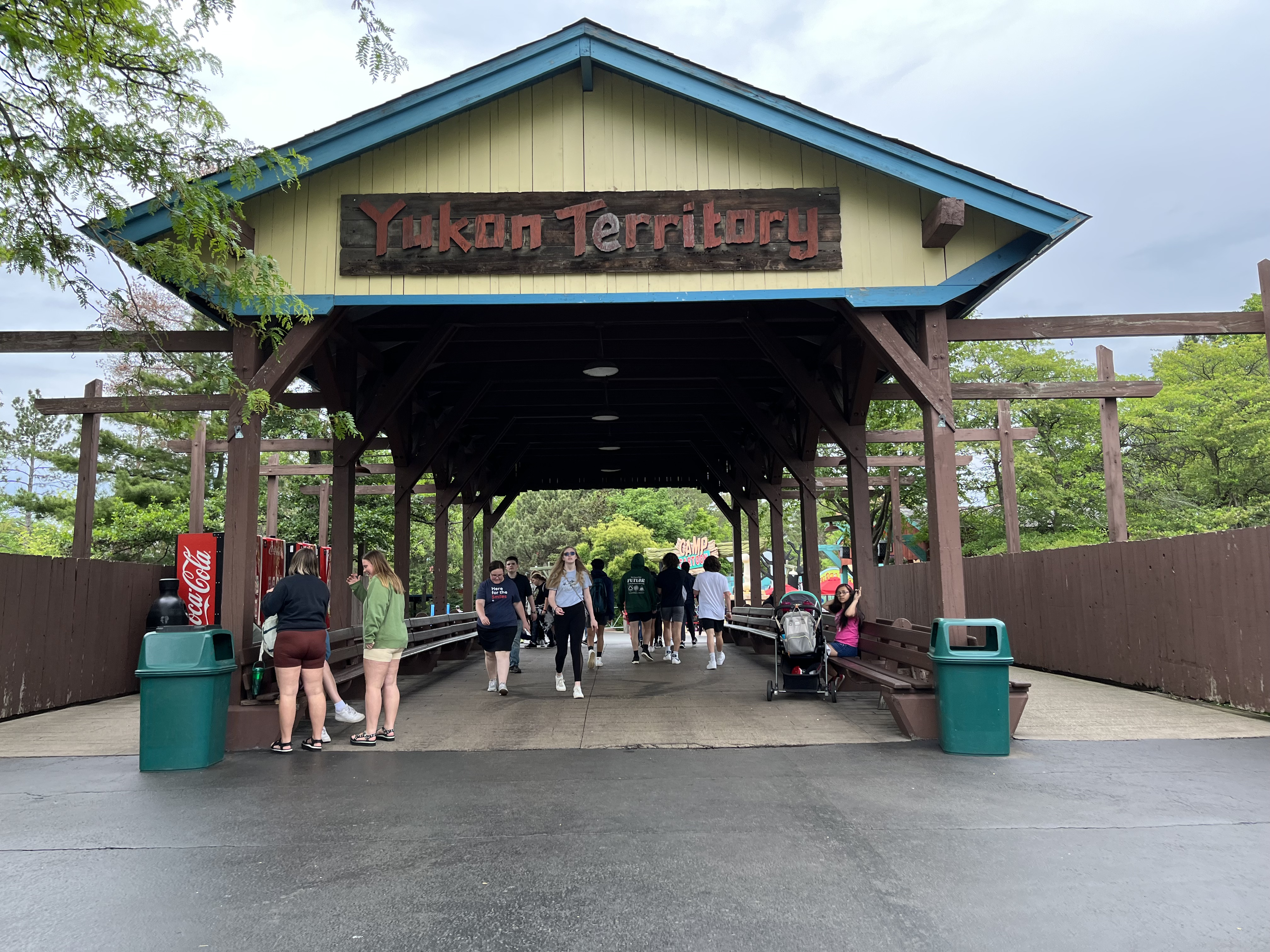
The County Fair to Yukon Territory entrance portal.

Yukon Territory is a themed area based around the famous forests and mountains in northwest Canada, with references to logging, prospecting and gold panning, specifically the Klondike Gold Rush. In 2027, Camp Timber Trail, a woodland-themed family area, will fully replace Yukon Territory.

Yukon Territory formerly held two kids areas. The first was Bugs Bunny National Park that opened in 1998, but was fully replaced with Winner's Circle Go Karts, an upcharge attraction, in 2012; Winner's Circle Go Karts was demolished in 2026. Camp Cartoon was another kids area in Yukon Territory that opened in 1998, featuring five attractions. Most Camp Cartoon attractions have since been removed.

- Little Dipper — a historic kids' wooden roller coaster that was relocated from Kiddieland; opened at Six Flags Great America in 2010.
- Logger's Run — a log flume ride that interlinks with Aquaman Splashdown, opened in 1976
- Sprocket Rockets — a kids roller coaster; formerly named Spacely's Sprocket Rockets, opened in 1998

=== County Fair ===
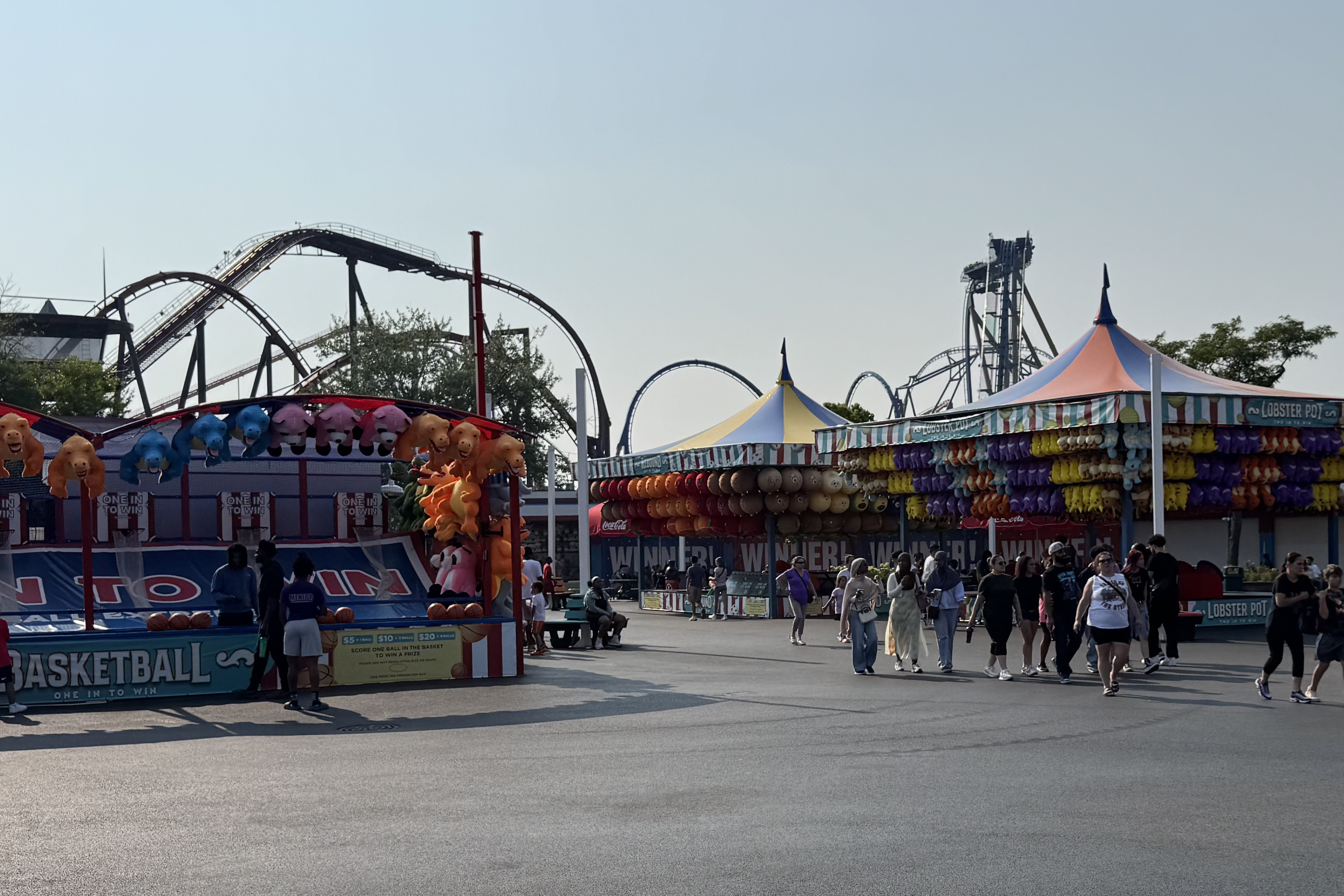
The County Fair Games Gallery, located in the back of the park.

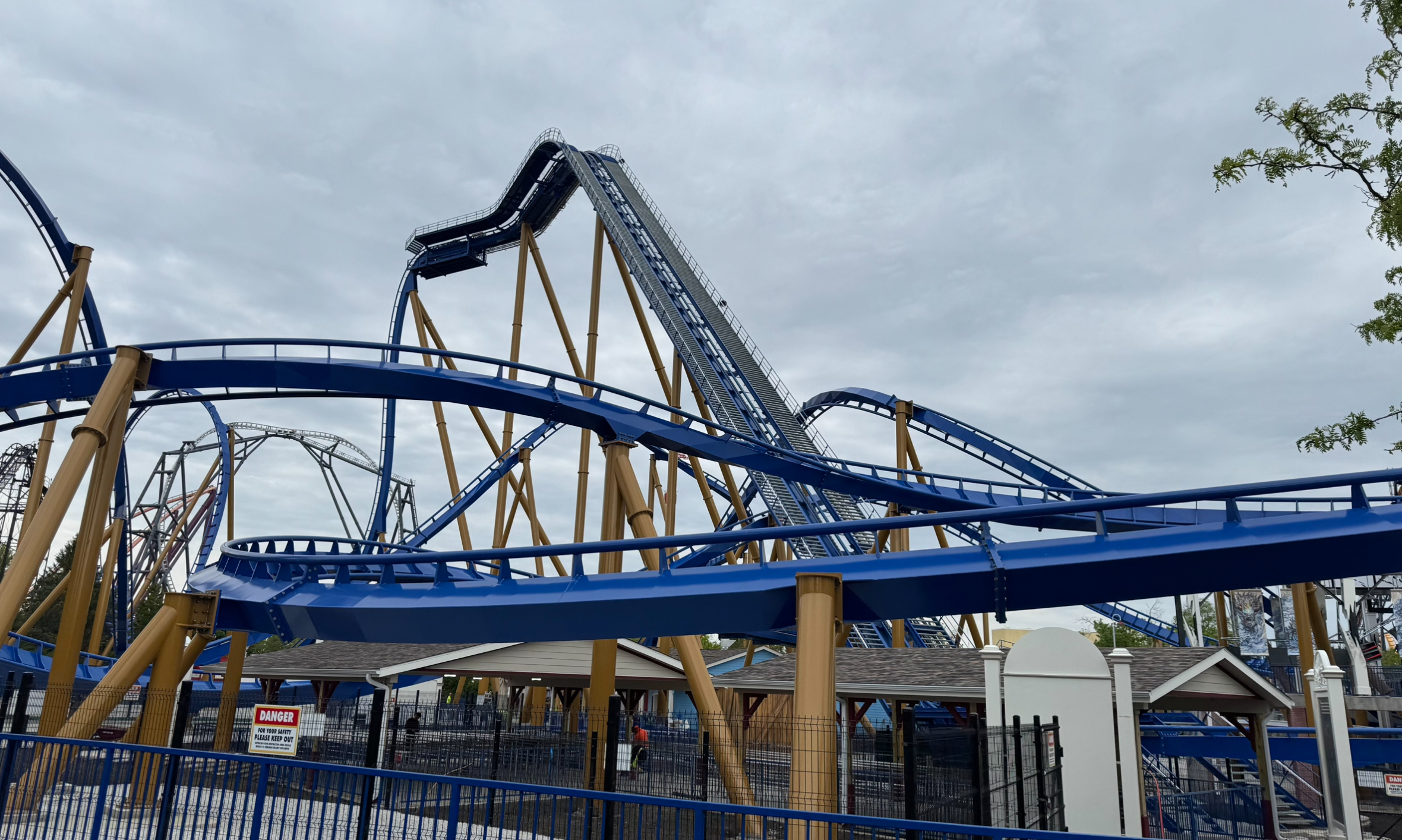
Wrath of Rakshasa is the newest attraction in County Fair, opened in 2025.

County Fair is an original themed area located in back of the park, and is the largest themed area, based on a rural county fair. There are many shops, stalls and attractions set in the theme. The area also features a food court, and a gallery of carnival games. Formerly, it was named "The Great Midwest Livestock Exposition at County Fair" and alternatively known as just "Midwest County Fair."

- American Eagle — a dual-tracked, racing wooden roller coaster that is the tallest, fastest, and longest of its kind, opened in 1981.
- Demon — a 100-foot (30 m) tall looping roller coaster themed to a demon; formerly named Turn of the Century, opened in 1976.
- Fiddler's Fling — a fast spinning ride.
- Goliath — a wooden roller coaster with 2 inversions, which is currently the tallest and fastest wooden coaster, opened in 2014.
- Sky Striker — a 172-foot (52 m) tall pendulum ride, opened in 2024.
- X-Flight — a wing coaster with 5 inversions, opened in 2012.
- Wrath of Rakshasa — a 180-foot (55 m) tall Dive Coaster which is the steepest of its kind, opened in 2025.

==== Kidzopolis ====
Kidzopolis is a children's area located within County Fair, located near the American Eagle entrance. Originally known as Wiggles World, the area was added for 2007. The Wiggles theming was removed after the 2010 season.

- Bouncer — small drop tower; formerly named Bouncin' With Wags, opened 2007.
- Krazy Kars — controlled car ride, opened 2007.
- Krazy Kups — small teacups ride; formerly named Dorothy's Rosy Tea Cups, opened 2007.
- Up, Up, & Away — aerial ride; formerly named Yummy Yummy Fruit Salad, opened 2007.
- ZoomJets — plane ride; formerly named Big Red Planes, opened 2007.

=== Metropolis Plaza ===
Metropolis Plaza is the smallest themed area of the park, based on the Metropolis city in DC Comics. It replaced the Southwest Amphitheater in 2016, and has one ride.

- Justice League: Battle for Metropolis — indoor DC Comics-themed dark ride, opened 2016.

=== Southwest Territory ===
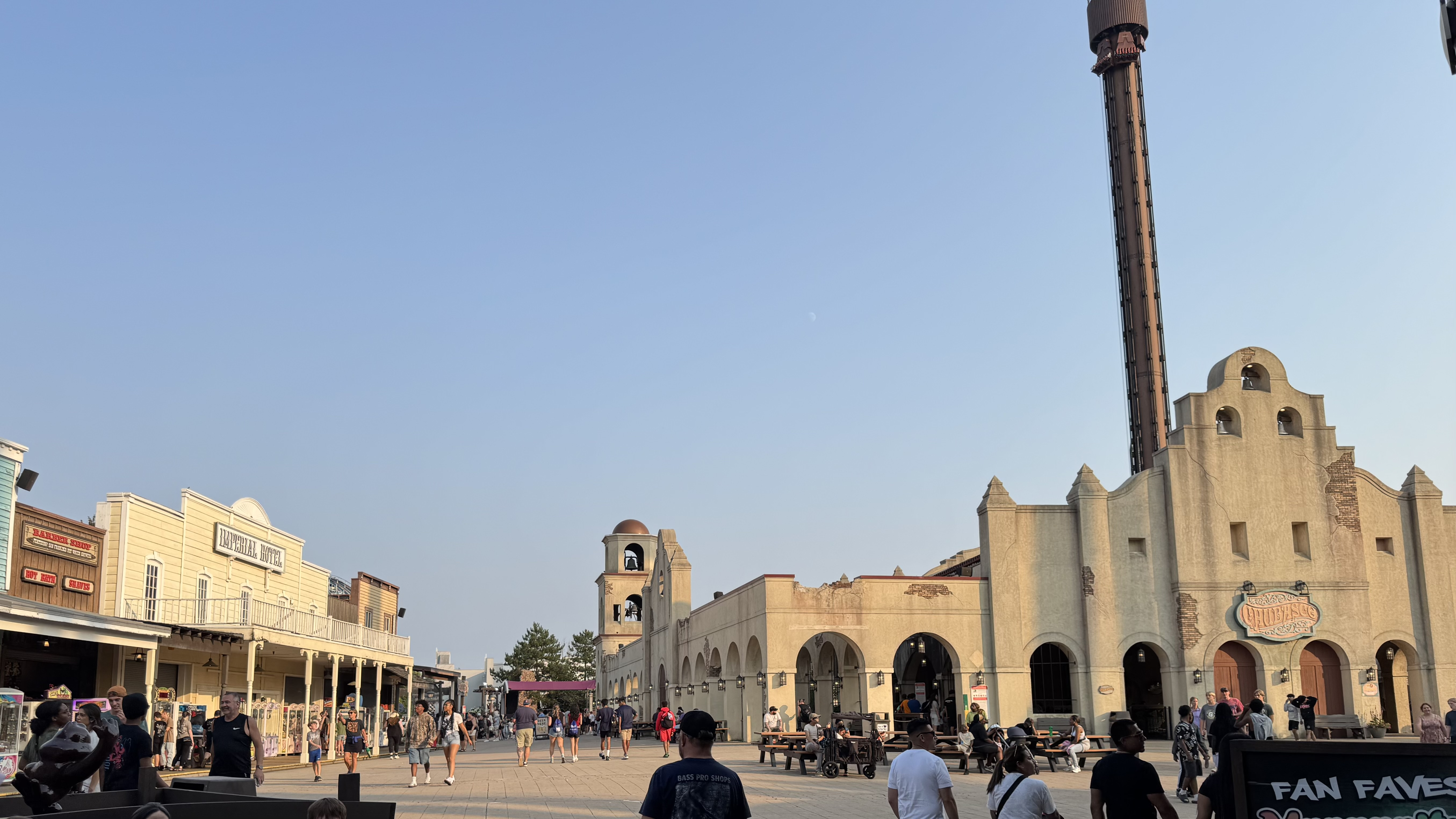
An overview of Southwest Territory.

Southwest Territory is themed around an old Wild West town and opened in 1996. The area is situated outside of the park's "Duell loop", connecting it to both Hometown Square and County Fair. It was also the entrance to the Hurricane Harbor water park prior to the water park becoming separately gated.

- Chubasco — indoor teacups ride, opened 1996
- Giant Drop — a 227-foot (69 m) tall drop tower, opened 1997
- Raging Bull — a hypercoaster with multiple airtime hills, opened 1999
- Ricochet — swinging ride; formerly named Big Top, opened 1977
- River Rocker — a pirate ship ride, opened 1996
- Viper — a wooden coaster, mirroring the layout of the Coney Island Cyclone, opened 1995

=== Hometown Square ===
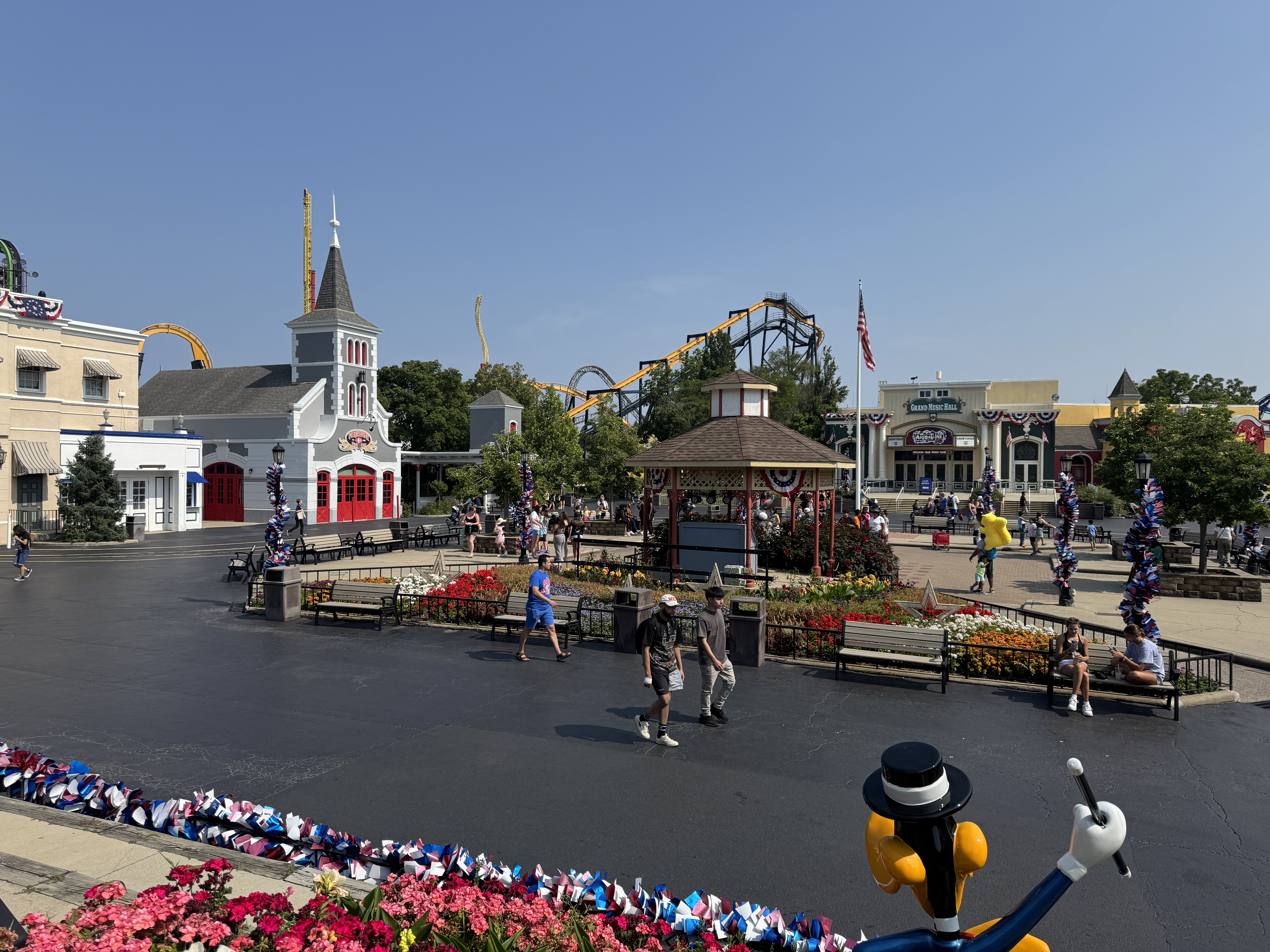
An overview of Hometown Square

Hometown Square is one of the park's original areas. It is themed after a small midwestern town around the turn of the century. Guests walk through many shops and stalls and can ride many classic carnival-style rides.

Whizzer, a Schwarzkopf spiral-lift coaster, is the last of its kind in the world. Hometown Square includes two show venues – the Grand Music Hall, an indoor theater, which at the park's opening, featured 1,600 seats, and the Hometown Square Stage, a stage on the Scenic Railway Station.

- Hometown Fun Machine — a spinning scrambler ride; formerly named Saskatchewan Scrambler, opened 1976
- The Lobster — a spinning octopus ride; formerly named East River Crawler, opened 1976
- Triple Play — a Troika ride, opened 1976
- Whizzer — a Speedracer family coaster, the last of its kind, opened 1976

==== Hometown Park ====
Hometown Park is a kids area located within Hometown Square. This section previously existed from the park's opening in 1976 until the rides were removed after the 2001 season. In 2015, three of the original rides returned as part of the park's 40th season celebration.

- Lady Bugs — carousel-type lady bug ride, opened 2015
- Red Baron — a plane ride, opened 2015
- Tot's Livery — carousel-type carriage ride, opened 2015

=== Hurricane Harbor Chicago ===
Six Flags Hurricane Harbor Chicago is a 20-acre (8.1 ha) water park that opened in 2005, featuring 25 water slides. The water park, which is part of the Six Flags Hurricane Harbor water park chain, was originally included with Six Flags Great America admission. It has been separately gated from the theme park since 2021.

== Fast Lane ==
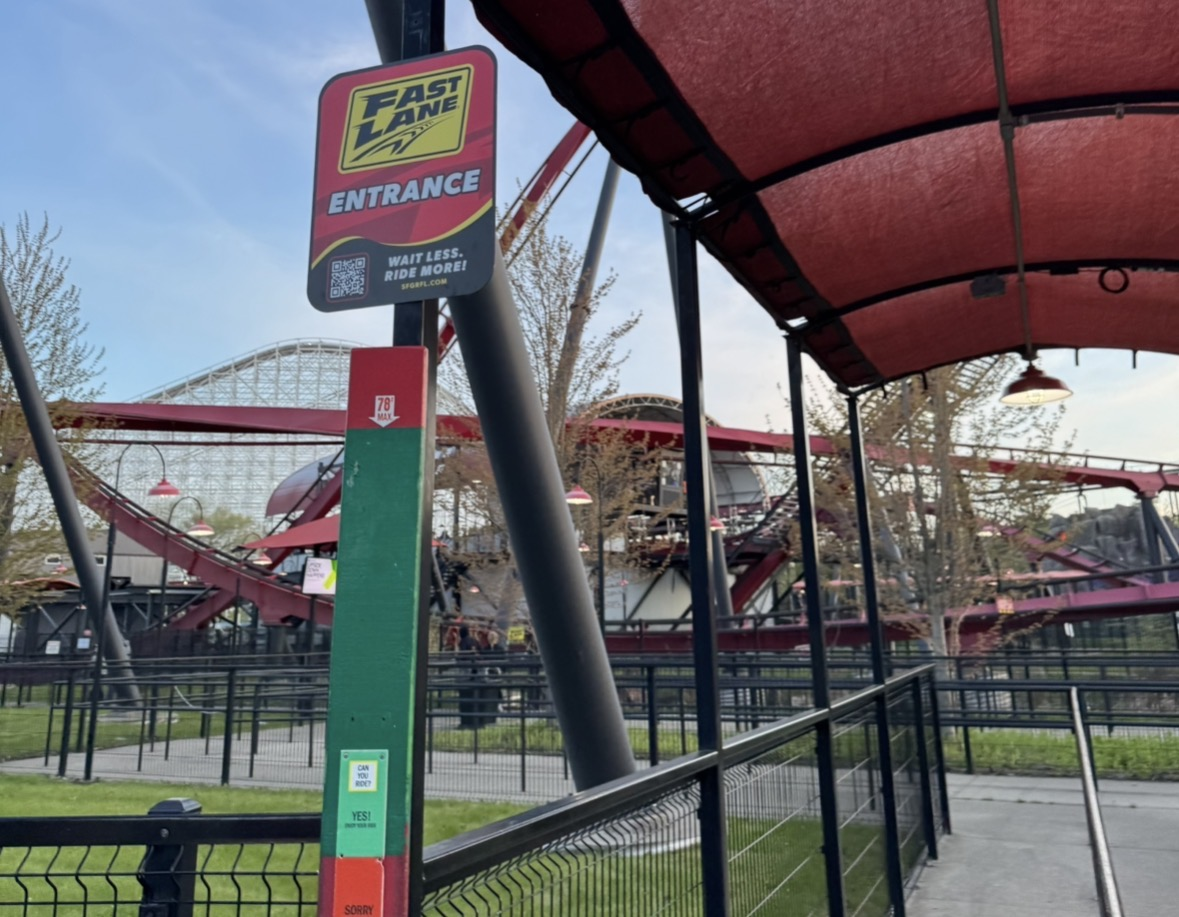
The Fast Lane entrance to X-Flight.

Fast Lane is a virtual queue system that offers shorter waiting times on the park's most popular rides. It is divided into three tiers: "Fast Lane Reserve" virtually reserves a visitor's position in line while "Fast Lane Priority" and "Fast Lane Ultimate" significantly reduces wait time. It was introduced upon the park's opening on April 25, 2026, replacing The Flash Pass. As of April 2026, all tiers of Fast Lane offer access to 20 rides, while Fast Lane Priority and Fast Lane Ultimate covers the same rides and additionally offers Maxx Force and Wrath of Rakshasa on a limited basis.

== Annual events ==
=== Fright Fest ===
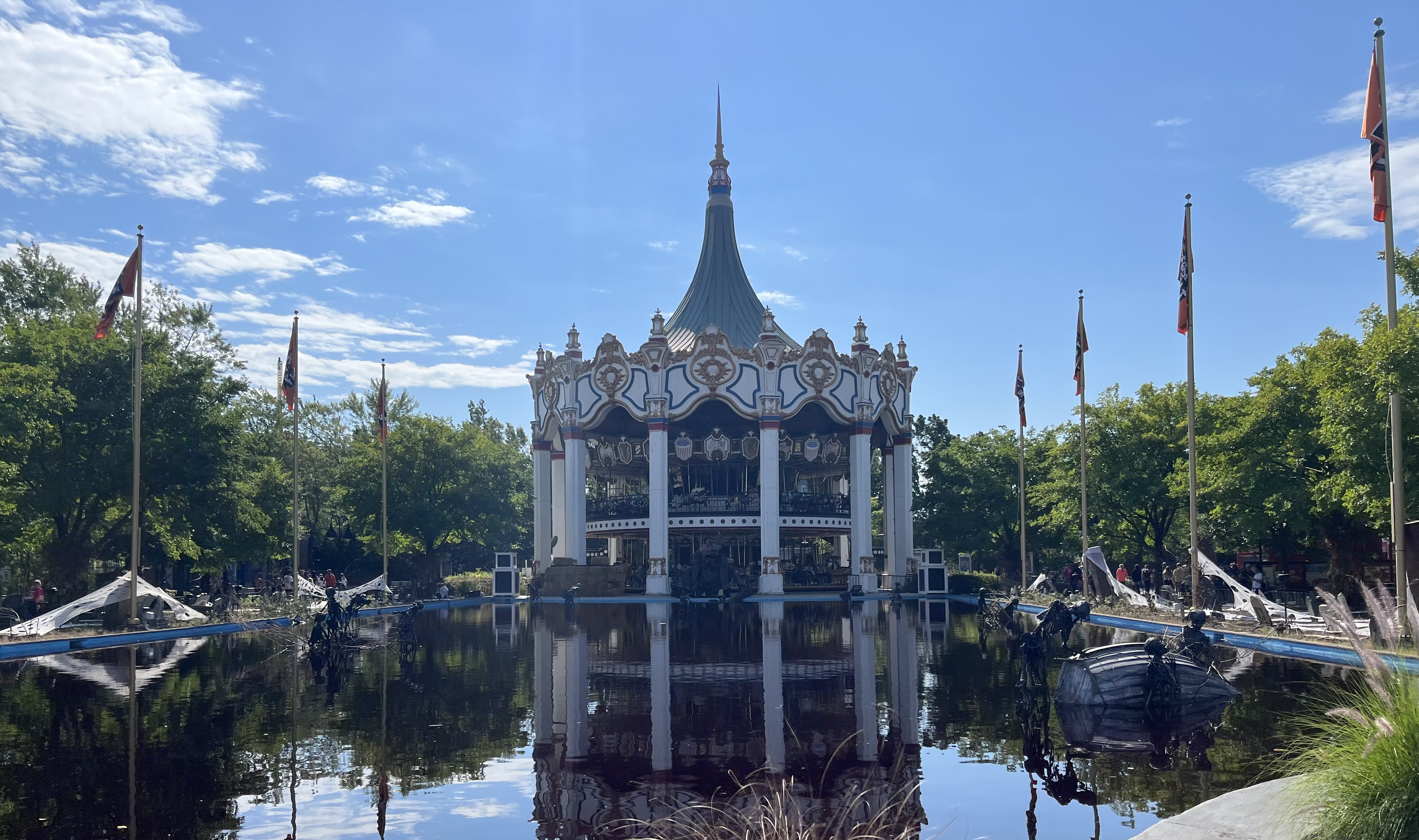
Carousel Plaza during Fright Fest, decorated with Halloween decor and Columbia Carousel's pond dyed red.

Fright Fest is an annual Halloween-themed event that debuted in 1991. It is held on weekends in September and October, with select dates extending into November. The park is decorated into several different themed "Scare Zones," featuring haunted houses (for an additional fee), scare actors, live shows, and rethemed rides. Tricks and Treats (formerly known as Kids Boo Fest from 2022 to 2026) is a family-friendly Halloween event that debuted in 2022 and is held on the same days as Fright Fest. It runs from the park's opening until dusk, after which Fright Fest begins.

Many of the park's rides receive special theming and operate differently than usual. A notable ride re-theme that occurs during the event is the teacup ride Chubasco, which is transformed into Terror Twister 2: A Turn for the Worse, in which the ride building is enclosed and a custom lighting design matched with a custom club style music mix is played.

Fright Fest also features live shows throughout the park. One of the park's longest-running productions is Love at First Fright, which follows the story of a couple who spends a night in a cemetery when classic Halloween characters show up. Running since 1991, the show changes each year to include various pop culture references. The Uprising is performed at dusk, where guests witness the rise of undead monsters, signifying the transition from Kids Boo Fest to Fright Fest.

== Attendance ==
Analysts position Six Flags Great America as a top-performing property within the Six Flags company. (Note: Attributed to multiple sources:) In 2013, the park reached 100 million overall guests. Under park policy, Six Flags Great America does not release attendance figures. However, the Themed Entertainment Association (TEA) estimates attendance numbers for the amusement park.

Year	Attendance (in millions)	North America Rank	Ref.
2006	2.62	19th	
2007	2.63	20th	
2008	2.67	20th	
2009	2.50	20th	
2010	2.70	20th	
2011–2015	No data	<20th	(Note: Indicates that Six Flags Great America did not rank in the top 20 of the Themed Entertainment Association annual attendance report for North American parks within the 2011–2015 time frame.)
2016	2.95	20th	
2017	3.04	20th	
2018	3.11	20th	
2019	3.17	20th	
2020	0	20th	(Note: The park was not open in 2020 due to the COVID-19 pandemic. This number does not include Hurricane Harbor Chicago's attendance.)
2021	2.68	20th	
2022	2.54	20th	
2023	2.90	19th	(Note: In the 2023 edition of the TEA/AECOM Theme Index Report, the original reported attendance for Six Flags Great America in 2023 was 3.00 million. This number changed to 2.90 million in the 2024 edition of the TEA Global Experience Index.)
2024	3.04	19th	

== Records and awards ==
=== Records ===
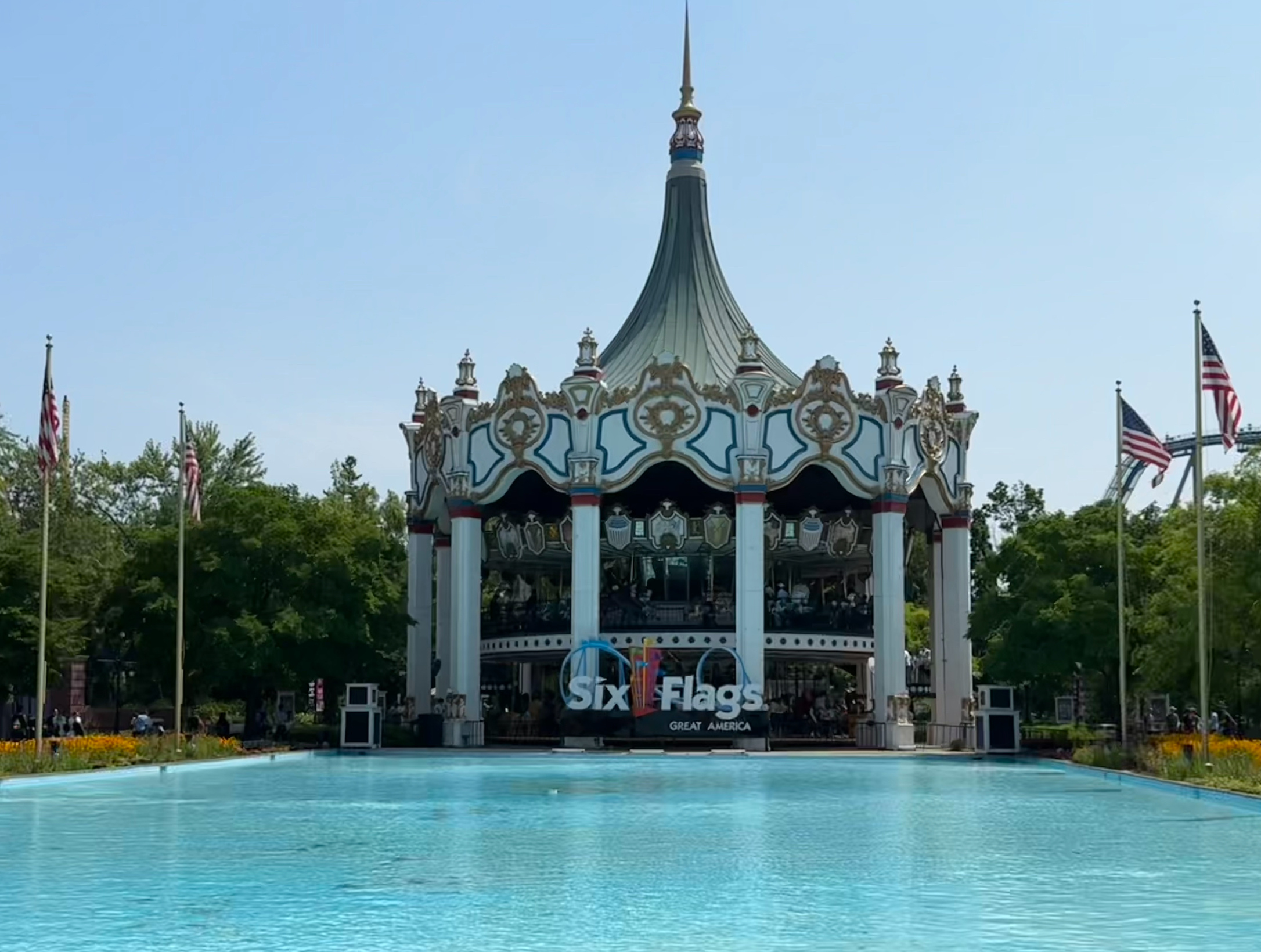
The Columbia Carousel is the second-tallest carousel in the world at 100 feet (30 m).

Upon the park's opening in 1976, its Columbia Carousel ride became the second-tallest carousel in the world standing at 100 feet (30 m) tall. Its counterpart at California's Great America in Santa Clara, California, conversely named Carousel Columbia, is the tallest carousel in the world, in which the California carousel stands 101 feet (31 m) tall.

One of the first record breaking roller coasters for the park was American Eagle, opening in 1981 as the tallest, fastest and longest wooden racing roller coaster in the world. The ride is 127 feet (39 m) tall, reaches speeds of 66 miles per hour (106 km/h), and 4,650 feet (1,420 m) each side. American Eagle still retains all of these records as of 2025.

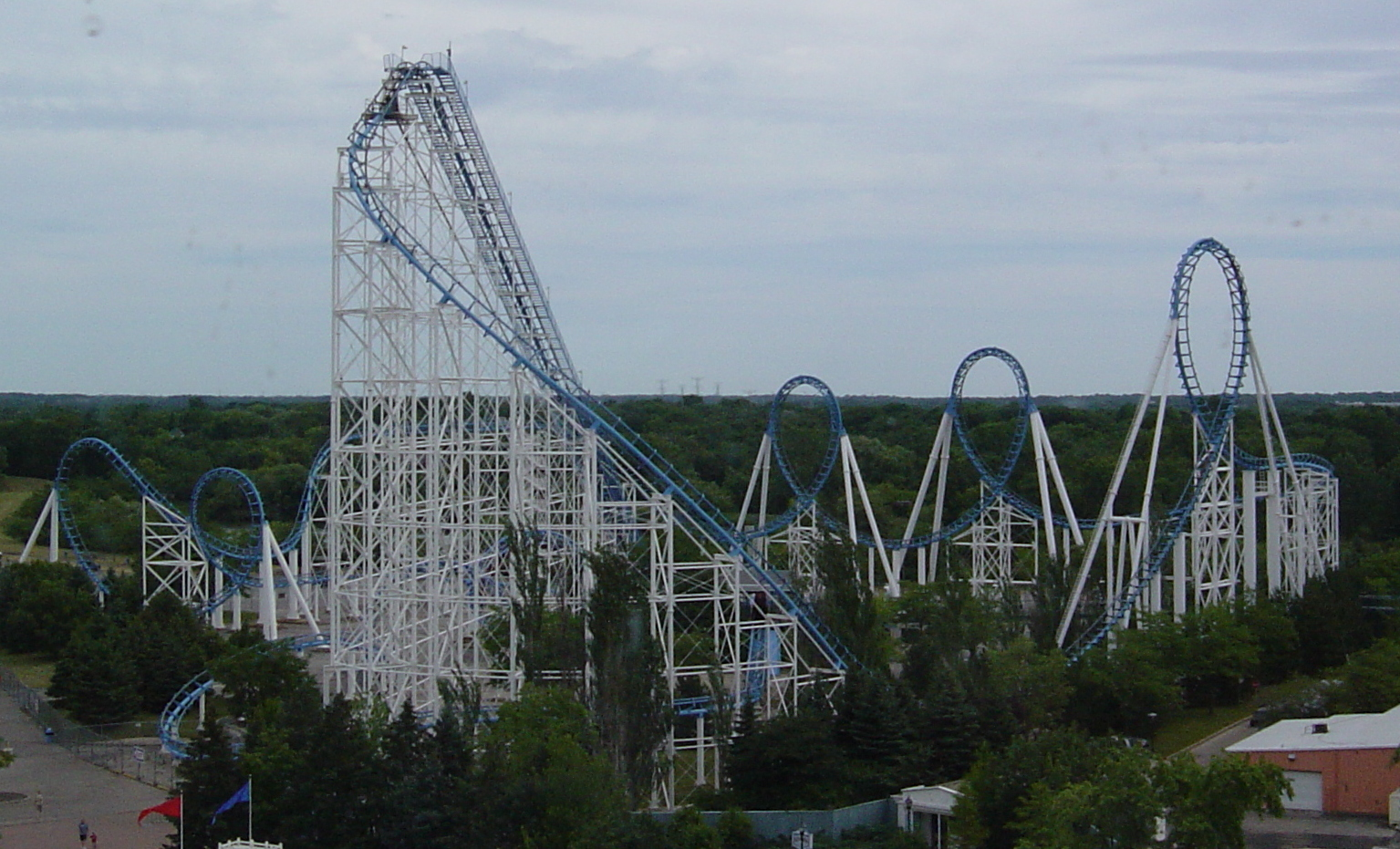
Shockwave (1988–2002) was the tallest roller coaster overall, fastest steel roller coaster, and had the most inversions on a single roller coaster (7).

The now-defunct roller coaster Shockwave, which opened in 1988, broke multiple records upon its opening. At that time, it was the tallest, fastest and most inverted steel roller coaster in the world. It was 170 feet (52 m) tall and 65 miles per hour (105 km/h) and had seven inversions. The records for tallest and fastest roller coaster were later surpassed by Great American Scream Machine at Six Flags Great Adventure less than one year later.

Batman: The Ride opened in 1992 as the first inverted roller coaster—a roller coaster where trains are positioned below the track—in the world, which was manufactured by Bolliger & Mabillard (B&M).

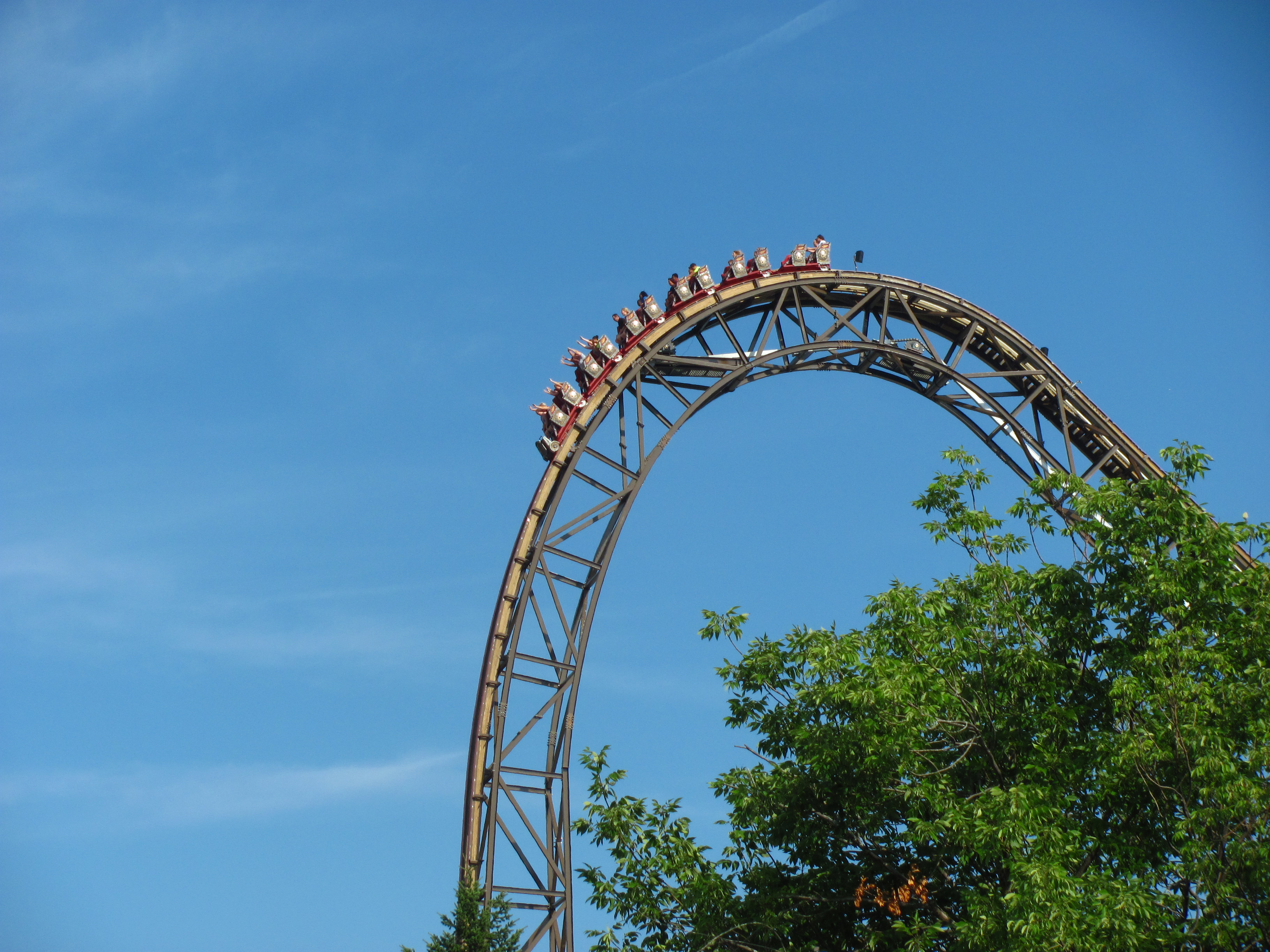
Goliath holds the world record for the fastest and the tallest drop on a wooden roller coaster.

Goliath claimed three Guinness World Records at its opening in 2014 as the steepest wooden roller coaster, longest drop on a wooden roller coaster, and fastest (Note: Lightning Rod had held the record of fastest wooden roller coaster from June 2016 until September 2020, before it was converted into a hybrid roller coaster.) wooden roller coaster in the world; as of 2025, the ride currently retains the latter two. The now-defunct Mardi Gras Hangover opened to the public on May 25, 2018, as the tallest fire ball attraction in the world.

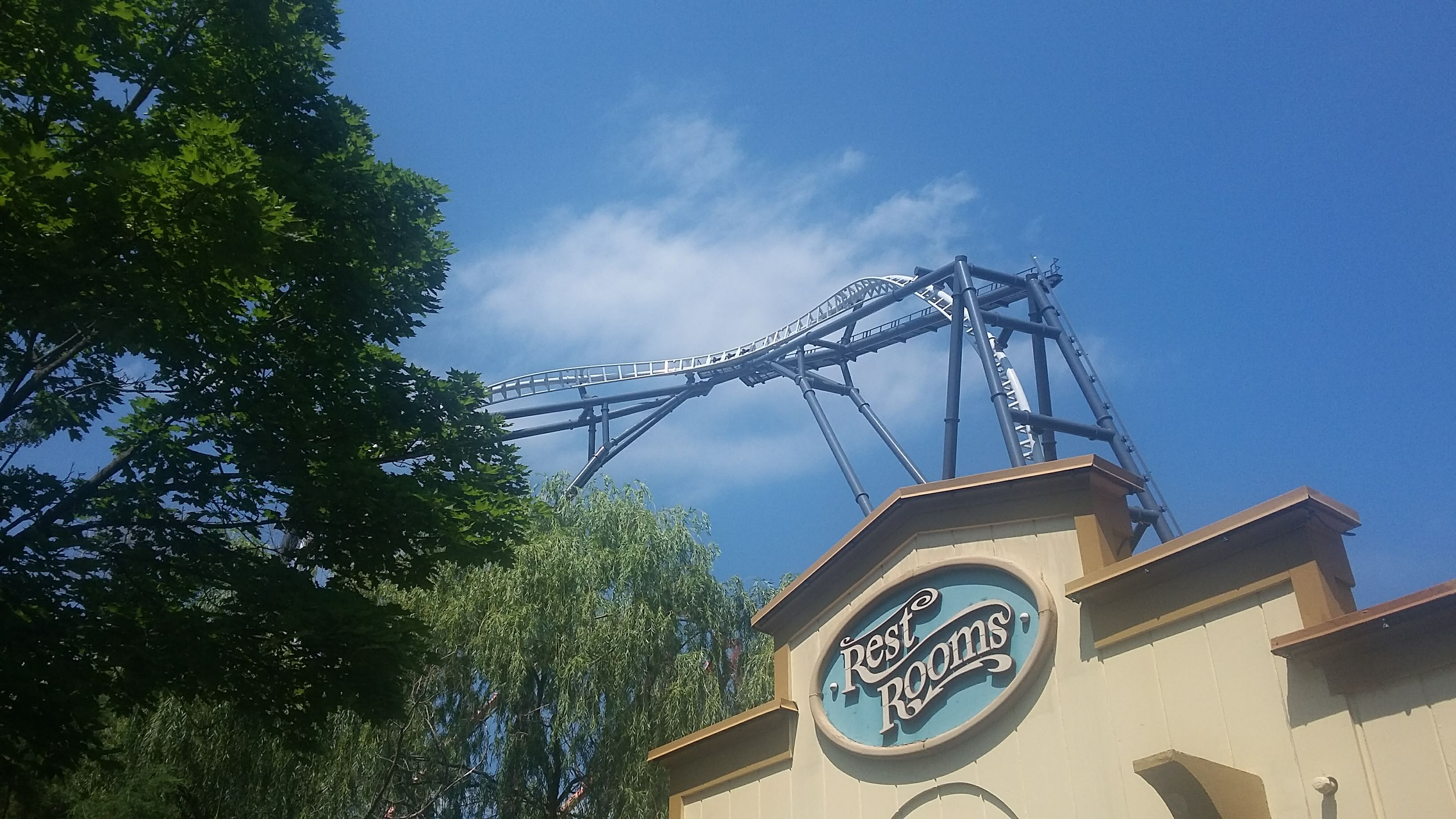
Maxx Force holds three world records, including fastest acceleration in North America, fastest inversion, and tallest double inversion

In 2019, Maxx Force opened with three record breakers with having the fastest acceleration in North America from 0 to 78 miles per hour (126 km/h) in 1.8 seconds, fastest inversion (heartline roll) in the world at 60 miles per hour (97 km/h) and tallest double inversion in the world at 175 feet (53 m).

Wrath of Rakshasa, a B&M Dive Coaster, opened in 2025 as the steepest dive coaster model at 96 degrees, and also has the most inversions on a dive coaster model with five inversions. Upon the opening of Wrath of Rakshasa on May 31, 2025, the park has 16 total roller coasters, making it the second-highest number of roller coasters in a singular park located in the Midwestern United States, behind its sister park Cedar Point.

From 2014 to 2017, Six Flags Great America also had the greatest combined wooden roller coaster track in a singular park at 16,558 feet (5,047 m), receiving a Guinness World Record on January 14, 2015. The record counts the track length of the roller coasters American Eagle (both sides), Goliath, Little Dipper, and Viper. These records were surpassed upon the opening of Mystic Timbers at Kings Island, with Kings Island having approximately 18,000 feet of combined wooden roller coaster track in a singular park.

=== Awards ===
Several of Six Flags Great America's roller coasters have appeared on Amusement Today's annual Golden Ticket Awards multiple times. The following lists the peak ranking for each roller coaster at Six Flags Great America on the Golden Ticket Awards and the year the roller coaster achieved its peak ranking:

Steel

- Raging Bull: 9th (2005)
- Batman: The Ride: 23rd (1998)
- Superman: Ultimate Flight: 35th (2004)
- Whizzer: 40th (2013)
- X-Flight: 45th (2013)

Wood

- Goliath: 13th (2016)
- Viper: 19th (1999)
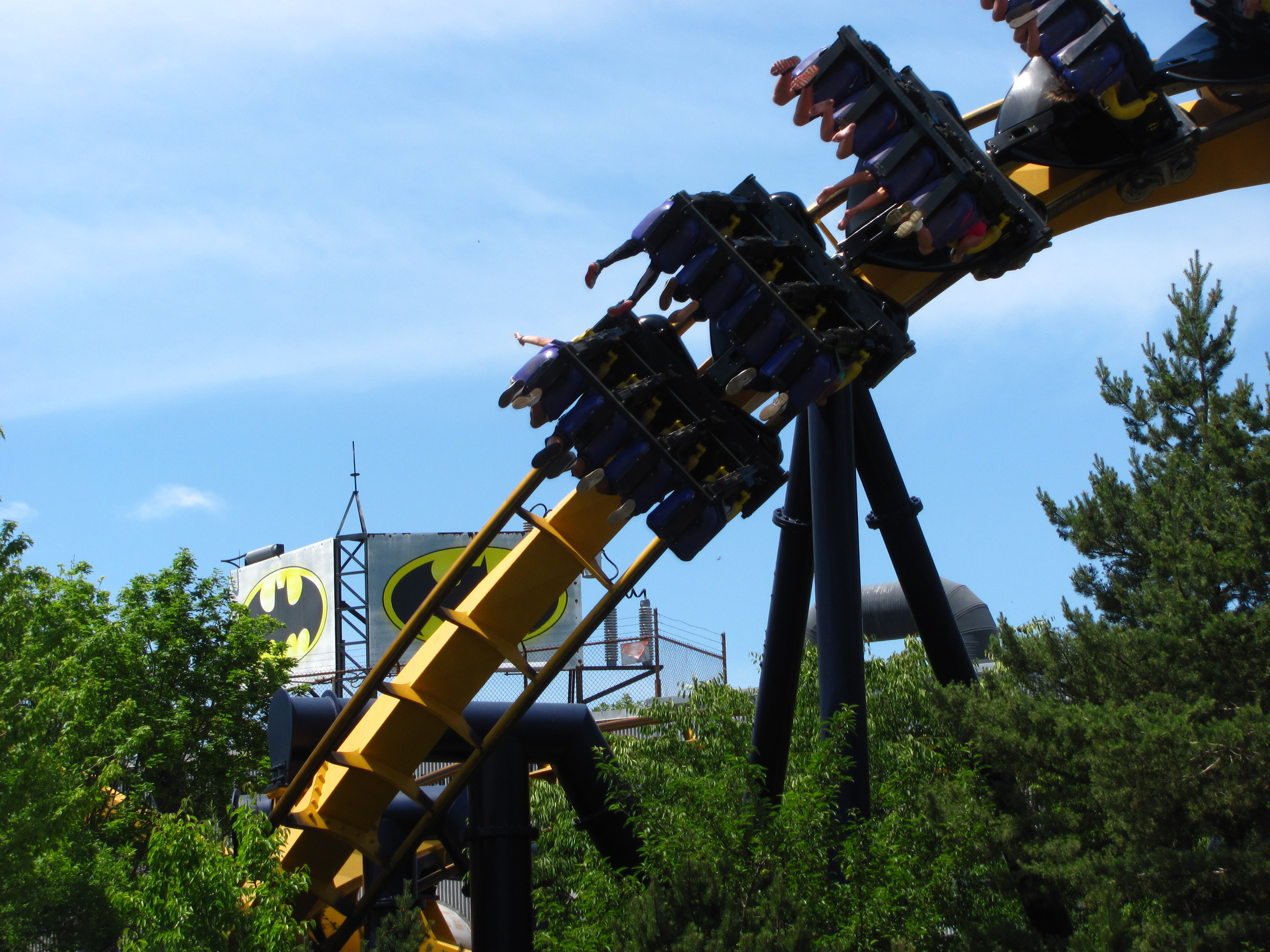
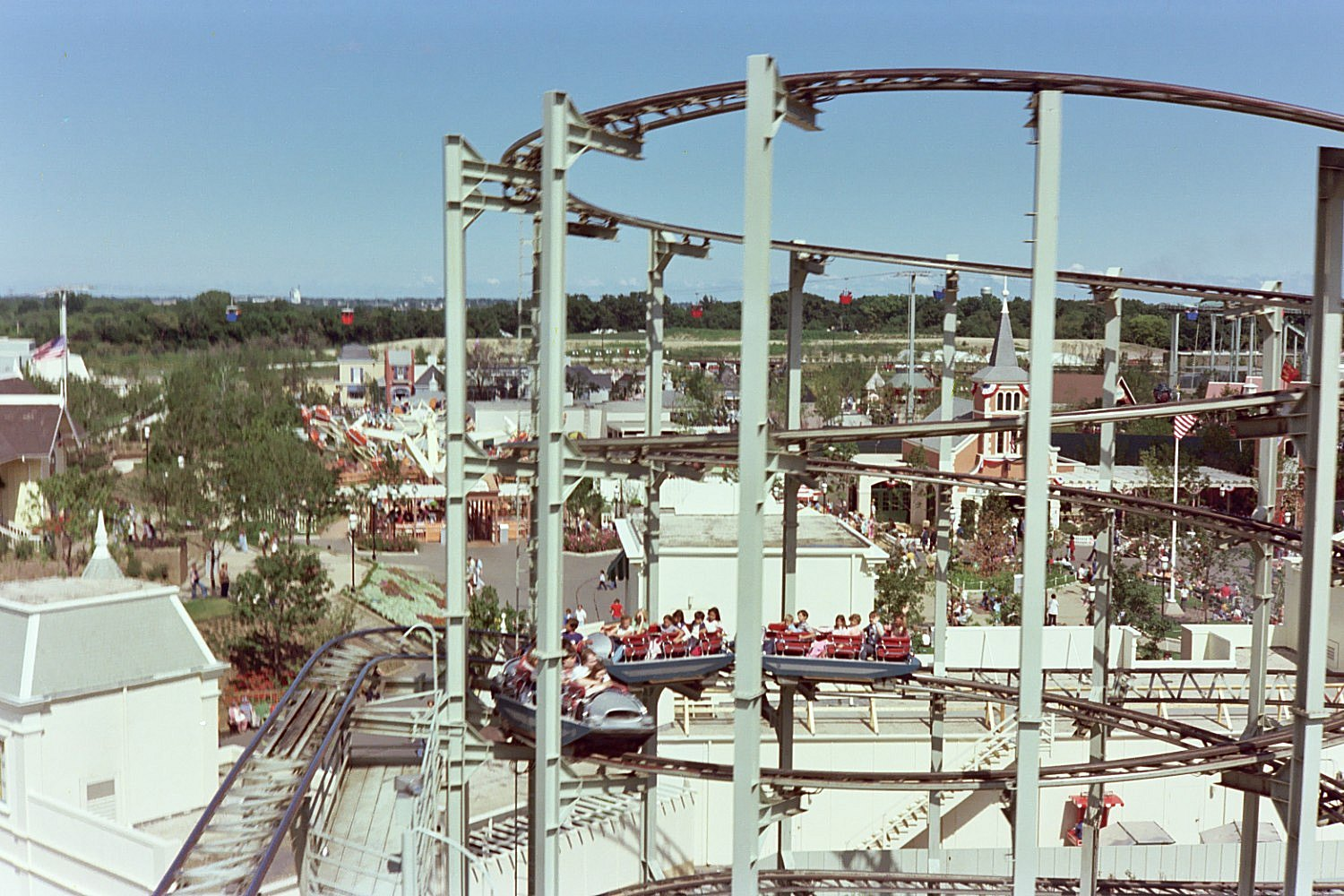

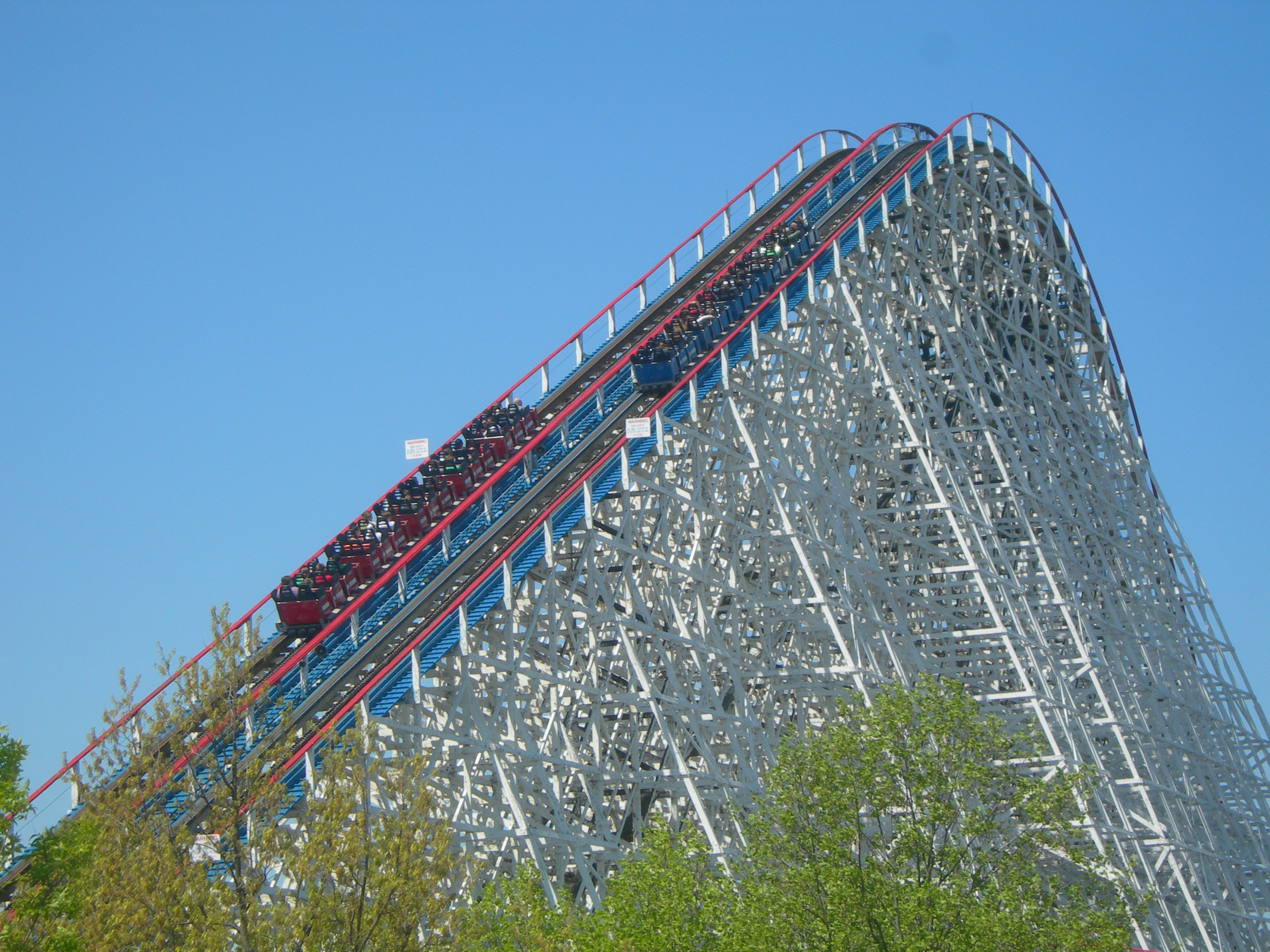
Top to bottom: Batman: The Ride, which received Landmark status in 2005; Whizzer, which received Landmark status in 2012; American Eagle, which received Landmark status in 2025.

Three roller coasters at Six Flags Great America were designated as a Coaster Landmark by the American Coaster Enthusiasts (ACE), a status reserved for rides of significance to amusement parks. It is one of two parks to have three ACE Landmark roller coasters, tied with Kennywood.

- Batman: The Ride received Landmark status on June 20, 2005, for its significance as the first inverted roller coaster.
- Whizzer received Landmark status on August 10, 2012, for the park's preservation of the attraction.
- American Eagle received Landmark status on June 16, 2025, for being Intamin's first wooden roller coaster and maintaining its records as the tallest and fastest dual-tracked roller coaster.

ACE has also awarded Little Dipper the ACE Coaster Classic award, an award given to historic roller coasters that utilize traditional operating practices and ride experiences characteristic of the early 20th century.

The International Association of Amusement Parks and Attractions (IAAPA) has awarded the park's entertainment and dining options multiple times. In 2005, 2007, and 2008, the Fright Fest show Love at First Fright won the IAAPA Big E! Award in the category "Best Overall Production: $25,000 or less." In 2010, 2013 and 2014, Love at First Fright won the IAAPA Brass Ring Awards in the category "Best Overall Production: $50,001–100,000." Show Stoppin' won the IAAPA Big E! Award in 2008 in the category "Best Overall Production: $25,001–50,000." The park's tanghulu was a finalist for the IAAPA Honors Award for "Best New Menu Item" in 2023–2024. Windy City Sports Bar and Grill, a restaurant in Southwest Territory, was a finalist for "Best New Food and Beverage Renovation or New Facility Build" in the IAAPA Brass Ring Awards in 2024–2025.

On USA Today's Readers' Choice Awards, Goliath ranked number 4 in the category "Best Roller Coasters in the Country" in 2018. Maxx Force ranked number 8 in the category "Best New Amusement Park Attraction" in 2019.

== Notable incidents ==
The following only lists major incidents that have occurred at the park, and does not include minor incidents or incidents that were caused by an underlying health issue.

- In 1976, two separate instances—one in July 1976, one in August 1976—occurred on Whizzer where a total of 31 guests were injured. The U.S. Consumer Product Safety Commission (CPSC) filed a formal complaint against the Marriott Corporation in 1980 for failing to report the incidents.
- On May 22, 1984, an incident on The Edge ride occurred when three riders were injured after the car fell backwards while it was going up. The incident directly caused the park to remove the ride in 1986.
- On April 19, 1998, a train on the Demon roller coaster stopped in the middle of a vertical loop, resulting in 23 riders being stuck upside down for two hours. An aerial fire apparatus was required to release stranded riders.
- On July 19, 2000, two riders were injured on the Cajun Cliffhanger ride when the ride's floor raised incorrectly, sustaining injuries to their feet. The incident resulted in its removal the following year.
- On May 29, 2004, an employee died after being hit by a train on the Ragin' Cajun roller coaster while attempting to cross the track.
- On March 11, 2008, a crew member that was part of an external company demolishing the Splashwater Falls attraction died after falling 40 feet (12 m) to the ground.
- In 2016, Six Flags was sued in the class action lawsuit Rosenbach v. Six Flags over allegations that the park violated Illinois' Biometric Information Privacy Act. Plaintiff Stacy Rosenbach alleged that her son was asked to provide a thumbprint scan without proper consent. It went to the Supreme Court of Illinois in 2019, which allowed the lawsuit to continue. Without admission of fault or liability, Six Flags settled the lawsuit in 2021 by agreeing to pay US$36,000,000 (equivalent to $42,772,934 in 2025) to affected parkgoers.
- On August 14, 2022, a drive-by shooting occurred in the park's parking lot, injuring three people. It prompted an immediate evacuation of the entire park, and was later determined to be a targeted incident.

== In popular culture ==
In the late 1970s, two television specials were produced to feature the Marriott theme park in Gurnee, Illinois, both produced by TV station WLS-TV. To celebrate the opening of Marriott's Great America, a special named Celebration At Great America first aired on July 2, 1976, and again on August 21. The special starred Steve Edwards and Sandi Freeman of WLS-TV. Celebrity guests included Mel Blanc as Bugs Bunny, other Looney Tunes characters, Jo Anne Worley, Forrest Tucker, Jerry Stiller and Roger Perry. The second television special from WLS-TV, titled You're Never Too Old, first aired on September 8, 1979, and again on April 26, 1980; hosted by actress Lisa Hartman.

In 1977, the park's circus show, Circus Fantastic, had one of its performances broadcast on the television series Captain Kangaroo with Captain Kangaroo (Bob Keeshan) himself as the ringmaster and special guest star Bob Denver of Gilligan's Island.

In 1994, the park's now-defunct Iron Wolf roller coaster was featured in the movie Richie Rich and was showcased as a backyard coaster. On August 26, 2009, the park was featured on Dinner: Impossible where host Robert Irvine creates a meal for coaster enthusiasts to celebrate the 10th anniversary of Raging Bull. In a 2013 episode of Insane Coaster Wars, the park's B&M wing coaster X-Flight was featured as a contestant against other roller coasters around the world. In July 2015, the K-pop boy band BTS filmed an episode of their variety show Run BTS where the members rode various rides during their time at the park.
