= Gold Striker =

Roller coaster in Santa Clara, California

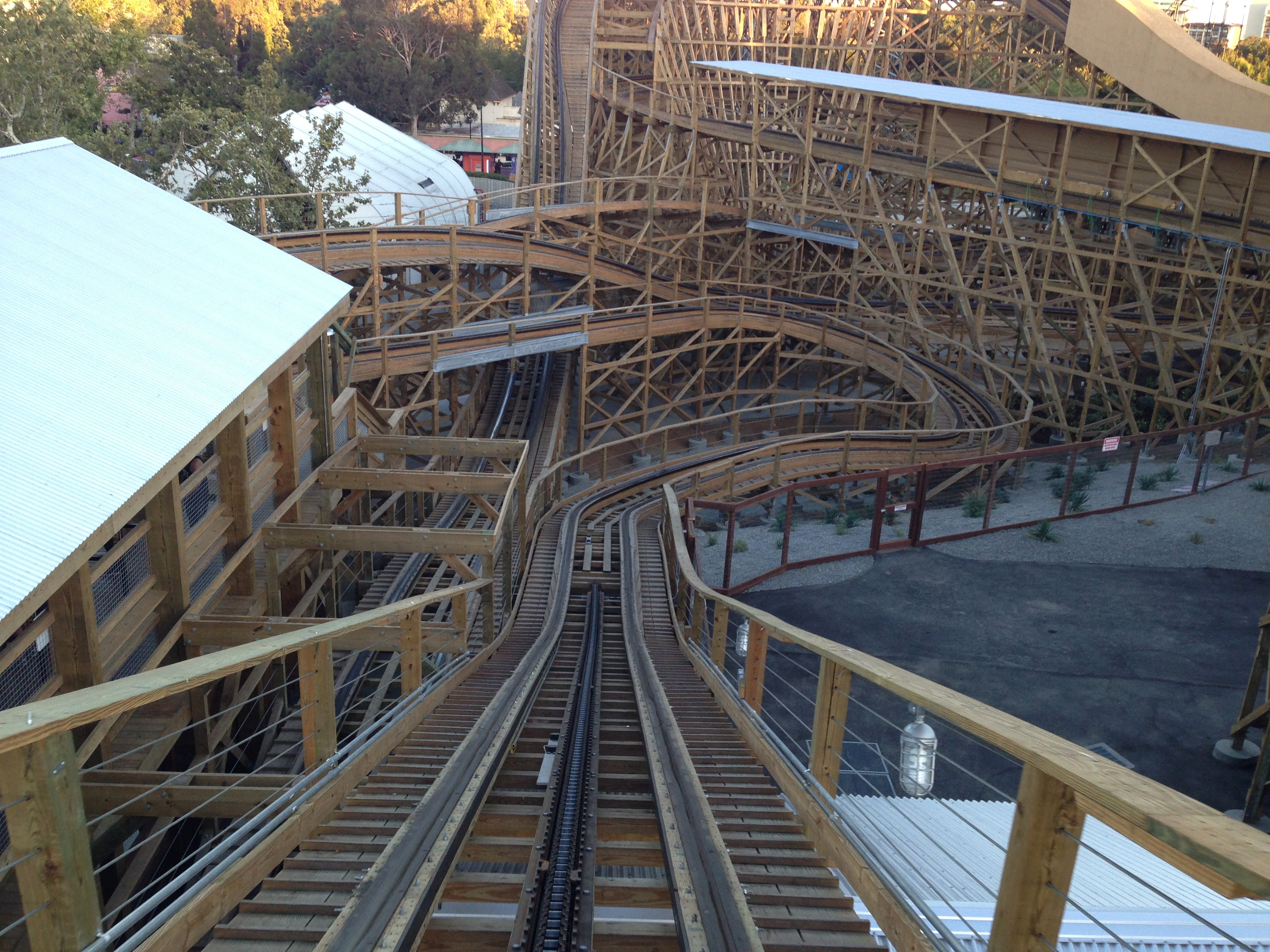

California's Great America
- Location: California's Great America
- Park section: Celebration Plaza
- Coordinates: 37°23′48.26″N 121°58′29.76″W
- Status: Operating
- Soft opening date: April 30, 2013
- Opening date: May 31, 2013
- Cost: $10,000,000
- Replaced: Whizzer

General statistics
- Type: Wood
- Manufacturer: Great Coasters International
- Designer: Jeff Pike
- Lift/launch system: Chain lift hill
- Height: 108.2 ft (33.0 m)
- Drop: 103.3 ft (31.5 m)
- Length: 3,197 ft (974 m)
- Speed: 53.7 mph (86.4 km/h)
- Inversions: 0
- Duration: 2:30
- Max vertical angle: 50°
- Capacity: 850 riders per hour
- G-force: 4.2
- Height restriction: 48 in (122 cm)
- Trains: 2 trains with 12 cars; riders arranged 2 across in a single row for a total of 24 riders per train
- Theme: Old West
- Website: www.cagreatamerica.com/play/rides/gold-striker
- Fast Lane available
- Gold Striker at RCDB

Gold Striker is a wooden roller coaster located at California's Great America amusement park. Built by Great Coasters International and designed by Jeff Pike, Gold Striker was the park's eighth roller coaster which opened to the public on May 31, 2013. Its 174-foot-long (53 m) tunnel is the longest in the world to be featured on the first drop, and it was marketed as the "tallest and fastest wooden coaster in Northern California". The roller coaster takes on the theme of the Old West and references the California Gold Rush of the 19th century. On November 6, 2026, Six Flags announced that California’s Great America would be permanently closing on September 6, 2027.

== History ==
California's Great America originally planned to build a new roller coaster for the 2009 season, but issues led to the project's cancellation. Plans were revived in 2012 when a permit was requested and approved to construct the new coaster in the northern half of the park. Construction began in May 2012, and the first pieces of lumber were delivered the following month in early June. On July 25, 2012, Cedar Fair Entertainment Company filed a trademark for the name Gold Striker. Vertical construction began in early August 2012. Gold Striker was officially announced on August 29, 2012. Representatives of the San Francisco 49ers were on hand at the ceremony, as the ride shares the same Gold Rush theme as the football team.

On January 30, 2013, Gold Striker reached its first milestone as the ride's lift hill was completed. On February 20, 2013, California's Great America announced that the first drop would be fully enclosed, setting a world record for the longest drop tunnel on a wooden coaster. The park auctioned seats on the first six trains for Gold Striker. Members of the general public were invited to participate in an early riding session on April 30, 2013, during the park's promotional shoot. Gold Striker opened on May 31, 2013 and had an official opening ceremony the following day.

On July 1, 2013, Gold Striker was temporarily closed due to noise complaints. According to park management, the high thrill of the ride caused screaming passengers to slightly exceed city standards. Audio technicians had tested the sound levels at an office building located about 500 feet (150 m) away from the park at 4555 Great America Parkway and found them to be slightly above permitted levels. The attraction reopened on July 4, 2013 after a 70-foot (21 m) tunnel was added.

== Ride experience ==
=== Layout ===
After departing the station, the train makes a slight turn to the right followed by another turn to the right, then the train turns left onto the 108-foot (33 m) lift hill. After the train crests the hill, it enters a tunnel then drops 50 degrees to the right, followed by another slight drop, reaching a top speed of approximately 54 miles per hour (87 km/h). The coaster's first drop wraps around the park's signature Star Tower attraction. The train then turns to the left into a bunny hop, passing by the station and lift hill. It then makes a turn-around to the right followed by an 80 degree banked turn. After the turn, the train passes back under the track into a "Midway turn" which, being another 80-degree turn, faces the train towards the park's Celebration Plaza. Passing again back under the track, the coaster goes through the final flat turnaround before making its way to the brake run.

=== Track ===
The wooden track of Gold Striker is 3,197 feet (974 m) long in length with the height of the lift being approximately 108 feet (33 m).

== Awards ==
Golden Ticket Awards: Best New Ride for 2013
| Ranking | 4 |

Golden Ticket Awards: Top wood Roller Coasters
| Year | | | | | | | | | 1998 | 1999 |
|---|---|---|---|---|---|---|---|---|---|---|
| Ranking | | | | | | | | | – | – |
| Year | 2000 | 2001 | 2002 | 2003 | 2004 | 2005 | 2006 | 2007 | 2008 | 2009 |
| Ranking | – | – | – | – | – | – | – | – | – | – |
| Year | 2010 | 2011 | 2012 | 2013 | 2014 | 2015 | 2016 | 2017 | 2018 | 2019 |
| Ranking | – | – | – | 26 | 7 | 9 | 9 | 10 | 8 | 12 |
| Year | 2020 | 2021 | 2022 | 2023 | 2024 | 2025 | 2026 | | | |
| Ranking | N/A | 12 | 11 | 12 | 14 | 19 | 19 | | | |

== Gallery ==
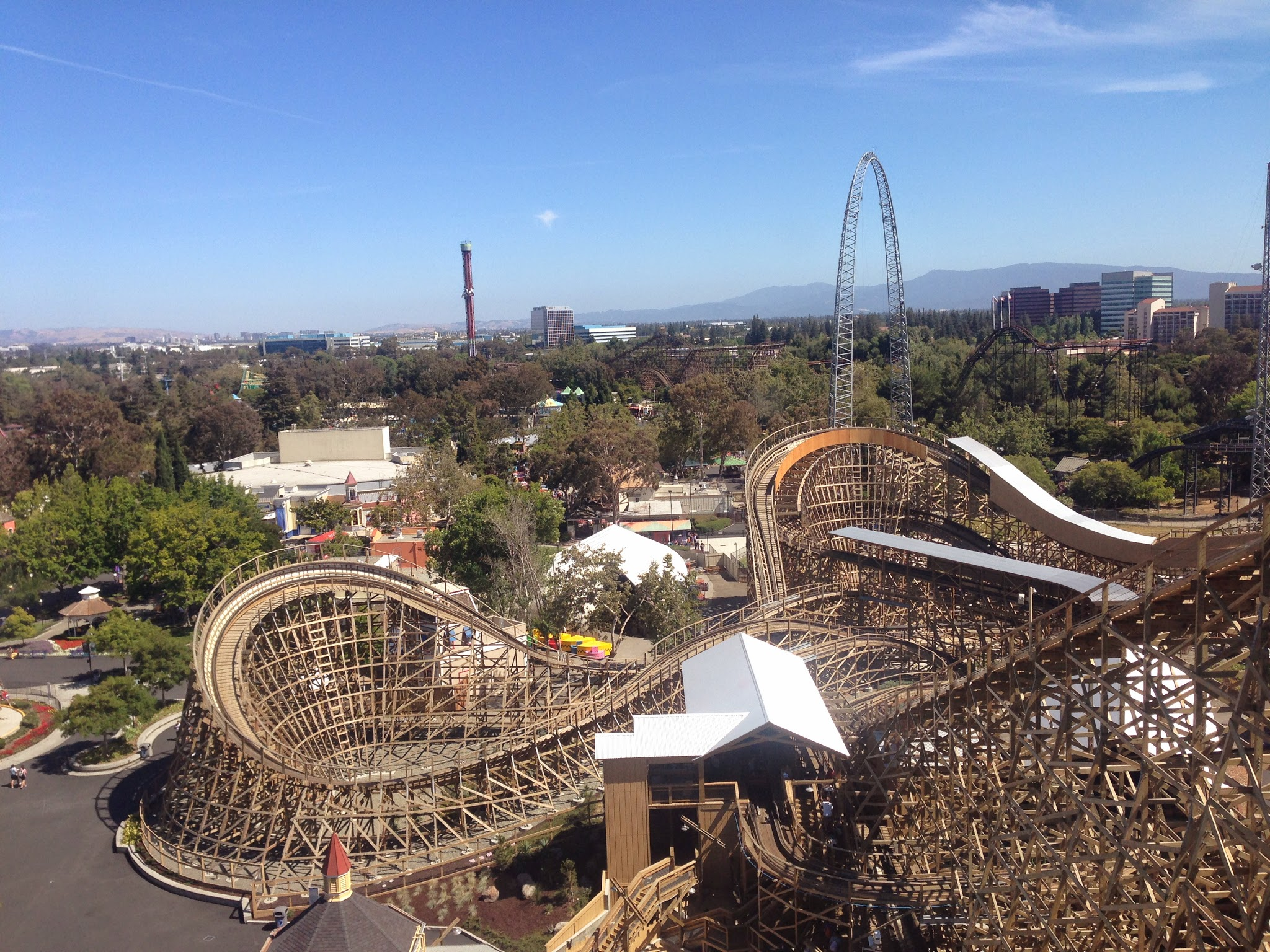
Aerial view

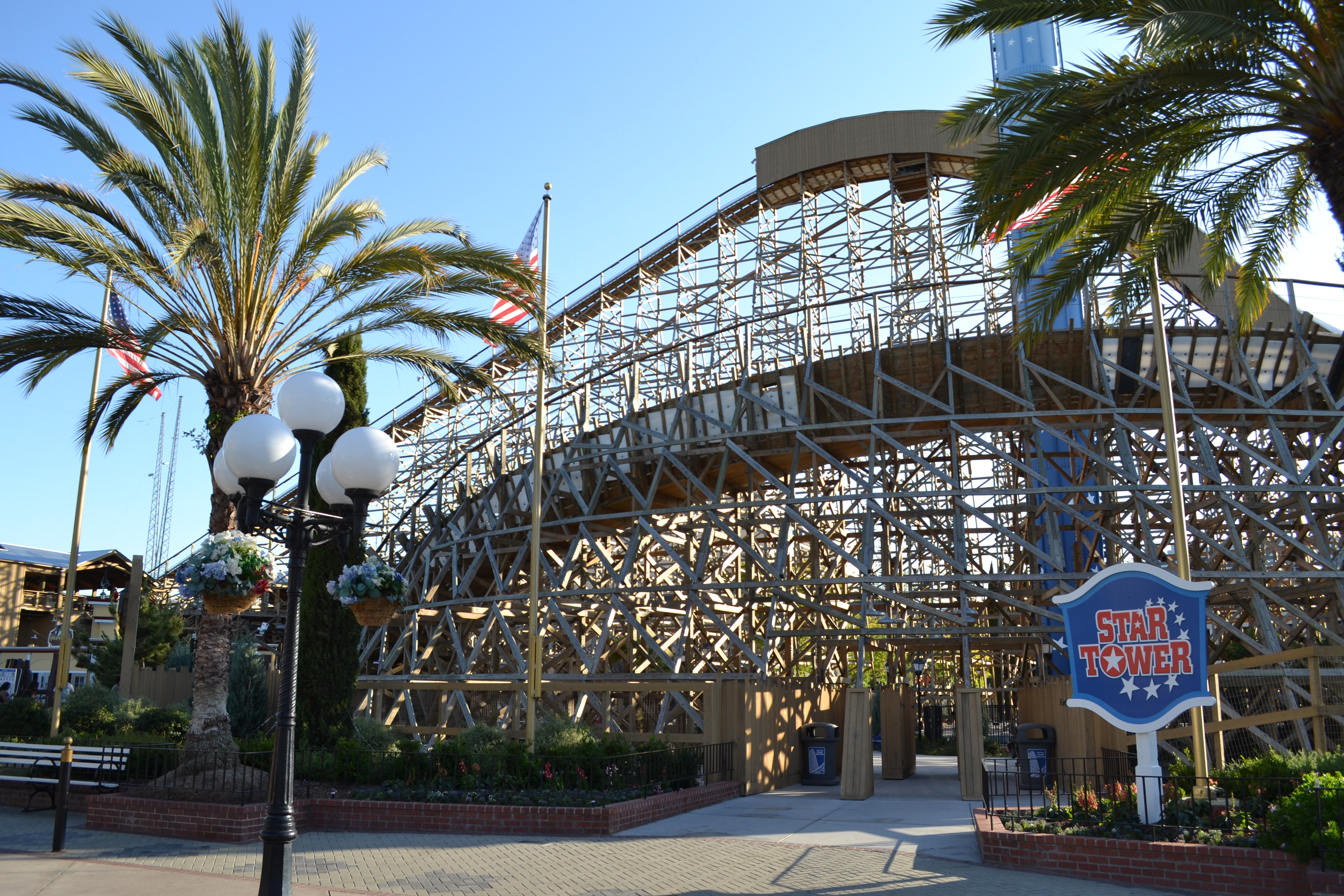
A view from the ground

== See also ==
- 2013 in amusement parks
