= KidZville =

KidZville may refer to several kids' areas at Six Flags amusement parks:

- California's Great America#KidZville, California's Great America, merged with Planet Snoopy in 2013
- Canada's Wonderland#KidZville, Canada's Wonderland
- Kings Dominion#Planet Snoopy, former kids' area at Kings Dominion, merged with Planet Snoopy in 2013
