= Sky Whirl =

Defunct amusement rides

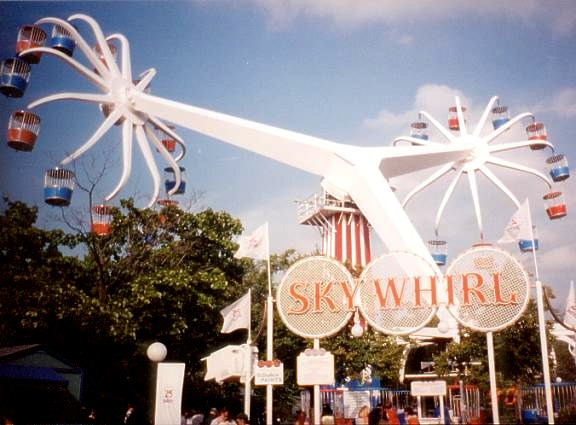
- Sky Whirl (Gurnee)

California's Great America
- Status: Removed
- Opening date: March 21, 1976
- Closing date: 1997
- Replaced by: Invertigo

Six Flags Great America
- Status: Removed
- Opening date: May 29, 1976
- Closing date: 2000
- Replaced by: Déjà Vu

Seibu-en
- Status: Removed
- Opening date: 1985
- Closing date: 2004

Lotte World
- Status: Removed
- Opening date: 1989
- Closing date: 1997

Ride statistics
- Attraction type: Triple Ferris wheel
- Manufacturer: Waagner-Biro
- Designer: Intamin
- Model: Tree Triple Wheel
- Height: 105 ft (32 m)
- Site area: 2,290 m^{2} (24,600 sq ft)
- Vehicle type: Enclosed cage
- Vehicles: 36 total (12 per wheel)
- Riders per vehicle: 6

Sky Whirl was the name of two amusement rides which featured triple Ferris wheels. Both debuted in 1976 at the California's Great America (in Santa Clara, California) and Six Flags Great America (in Gurnee, Illinois) amusement parks. The ride in Santa Clara closed in 1997, and the ride in Gurnee closed in 2000. Two additional triple Ferris wheels were later built for the Seibu-en and Lotte World parks in Japan (operating between 1985 and 2004) and South Korea (1989–97), respectively. All four rides were manufactured by Waagner-Biro and brokered by Intamin.

== Design ==
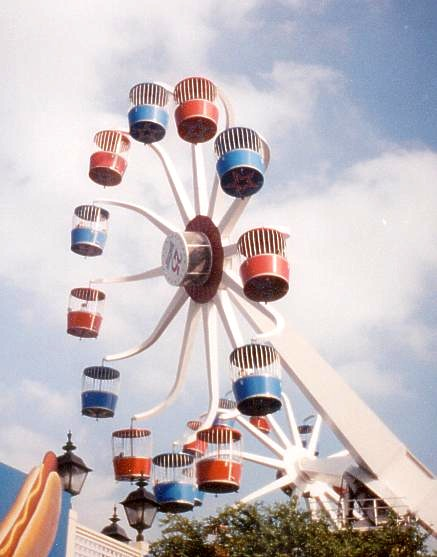
Each wheel had 12 passenger cars

The ride resembled a huge tree topped with three arms; the arms rotated as a unit on an axis canted from vertical. Each arm was tipped with a rotating wheel, or "spider", and each spider carried 12 passenger cages. Due to the off-vertical axis, two wheels spun in the air in a near-vertical plane while the third was on the ground stationary in a horizontal plane, loading and unloading passengers from all the cars on that wheel simultaneously.

Intamin marketed the ride as the "Tree Triple Wheel" and advertised a capacity of 2,000 customers per hour. The ride had a peak height of 110 feet (34 m) and required a circular footprint 54 metres (177 ft) in diameter.

Sky Whirl was developed from the earlier Giant Wheel, a double wheel design that Intamin had first installed at Hersheypark in 1973. Intamin's Giant Wheel was in turn inspired by an earlier double wheel design patented in 1966 to address the slow loading of conventional Ferris wheel designs. That first double wheel debuted with Astroworld as the Astrowheel in 1968. The Sky Whirl design was commissioned by Marriott for both of its Great America theme parks. Because these parks (both Great America parks, Hersheypark, and Astroworld) were all designed by the same firm, R. Duell and Associates, some common design elements were carried through each park, including the double/triple-wheel designs.

== History ==
Both rides debuted with the opening of the Great America parks in 1976. At the time the theme park in Santa Clara opened on March 21, 1976, it was billed as having the world's first triple Ferris wheel. The Gurnee park opened on May 29.

The Santa Clara ride, which appeared in the 1994 movie Beverly Hills Cop III as "The Spider", was later renamed Triple Wheel before it closed in 1997. At Santa Clara, Sky Whirl was replaced by the Invertigo roller coaster. The identical Gurnee ride closed in 2000 and was replaced by Déjà Vu for the 2001 season.

Two other triple wheels were produced for Asian clients: Seibu-en (Tokorozawa, Saitama, Japan; operated 1985–2004) and Lotte World (Seoul, South Korea; 1989–97). According to Harry Michelson, because relatively few double and triple wheels were built, production was discontinued sometime in the 1990s and parts became scarce, making maintenance of these relatively complicated rides difficult and expensive.
