= South Bay Shores =

Water park in California, US

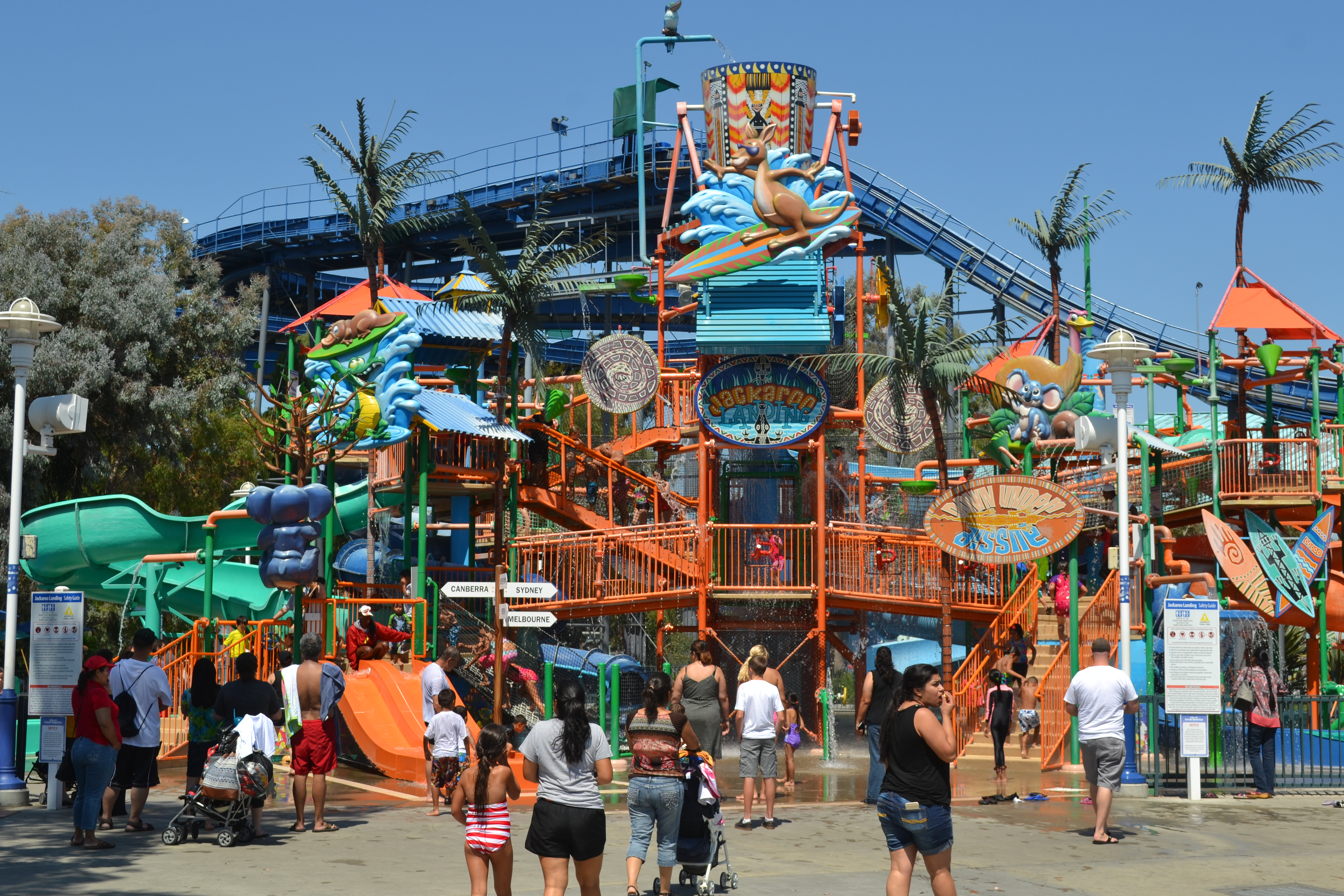
- Pup's Pier (then Jackaroo Landing) (2015)
- Interactive map of South Bay Shores
- Location: California's Great America, Santa Clara, California, United States
- Coordinates: 37.3962°N 121.9708°W
- Owner: Six Flags
- Opened: 2004
- Previous names: 2004–2006: Crocodile Dundee's Boomerang Bay; 2007–2019: Boomerang Bay
- Operating season: May to September
- Area: 11 acres (45,000 m^{2})
- Pools: 2 pools
- Water slides: 11 (excluding kiddies) water slides
- Children's areas: 2 children's areas
- Website: www.sixflags.com/cagreatamerica/south-bay-shores

South Bay Shores is a water park located at California's Great America amusement park in Santa Clara, California. The water park is owned and operated by Six Flags Entertainment Corporation and opened as Crocodile Dundee's Boomerang Bay in 2004. The name was shortened to Boomerang Bay in 2007. For the 2021 season, it was expanded and renamed South Bay Shores. On November 6, 2026, Six Flags announced that California’s Great America would be permanently closing on September 6, 2027.

== History ==
Park logo when it was known as Boomerang Bay

Crocodile Dundee's Boomerang Bay opened in 2004 as the first water park in Northern California to be included within an amusement park. Originally covering 2.7 acres (11,000 m^{2}), the water park was expanded the following year in 2005 to 11 acres (45,000 m^{2}) with the addition of a lazy river ride, two water slides and a 150,000-US-gallon (570 m^{3}) swimming pool. Following Cedar Fair's (now Six Flags) purchase of Paramount Parks properties in 2006, which included California's Great America, the name of the water park was shortened to Boomerang Bay for the 2007 season.

On August 8, 2019, California's Great America announced that Boomerang Bay would be renamed South Bay Shores and expanded for the 2020 season with several new additions, including a six-slide complex, eight kiddie slides, and other amenities within the complex. The park did not operate in 2020 or in the first half of the 2021 season due to the COVID-19 pandemic and two stay-at-home orders issued by California Governor Gavin Newsom.

In 2022, Cedar Fair sold the land occupied by the park to Prologis, announcing intentions to permanently close Great America by 2033, as early as 2028. Cedar Fair stated that the sale will help them lower the company's corporate debt to $2 billion.

== List of attractions ==
Intensity rating (out of 5)
1 (low) 2 (mild) 3 (moderate) 4 (high) 5 (aggressive)

Note: Number ratings assigned per California's Great America, while the colors are unique to Wikipedia. For more details, refer to the California's Great America Guest Assistance Guide.

Name	Year Opened	Description	Former name	Manufacturer	Model	Rating
Barracuda	2021	Solo inner-tube water slide with a drop at the end. Part of Pacific Surge six-slide complex.	N/A	WhiteWater West	Open Flume	5
Breakers Bay	2007	355,000-US-gallon (1,340 m^{3}) wave pool.	Great Barrier Reef		Wave Pool	4
Coastal Cruz	2004	Four-person raft water slide	Didgeridoo Falls	WhiteWater West	Family Raft Ride	4
Feeding Frenzy	2021	Solo inner-tube water slide with a bowl at the end. Part of Pacific Surge six-slide complex.	N/A	WhiteWater West	Super Bowl	5
Mission Falls	2004	Two-person inner-tube water slide	Down Under Thunder	WhiteWater West	Boomerango	4
NorCal Wipeout	2004	Fully enclosed, two-person inner-tube water slide	Tasmanian Typhoon	WhiteWater West	Water Coaster	3
Otter Trotter	2004	Children's "spray-ground" with interactive fountains and other water activities.	Kookaburra Cay	WhiteWater West	AquaSpray	1
Pup's Pier	2004	Family-oriented, multi-level water fortress complete with slides, bridges, and rope ladders	Jackaroo Landing	WhiteWater West	Rain Fortress 5A	3
Reef Racer (1st Slide)	2005	30-foot-tall (9.1 m) body water slide with enclosed chute and a 45-degree drop, relocated from the former Manteca Waterslides.	Ripsnort Ridge	ProSlide	PLUMMET	4
Reef Racer (2nd Slide)	2005	Fully enclosed body water slide over three stories tall featuring twists and serpentine curves, relocated from the former Manteca Waterslides.	Screamin' Wombat	ProSlide	TurboTWISTER	4
Rushin' River	2005	Lazy river ride	Castaway Creek		Wave Pool	2
Shark Reef Plunge	2021	Four fully enclosed drop capsule body water slides. Part of Pacific Surge six-slide complex. It is similar to the installations at other parks including Kings Dominion, Dorney Park, Carowinds, Cedar Point, Knott's Berry Farm, Worlds of Fun, and Kings Island.	N/A	WhiteWater West	AquaDrop/HSAT	5
Tide Pool	2005/2021	Family-friendly 150,000-US-gallon (570 m^{3}) heated lagoon with a tropical theme. 8 new kiddie water slides added to the lagoon in 2021.	Boomerang Lagoon	WhiteWater West (Slides)	Mini Slides	1
