= California's Great America =

Amusement park in Santa Clara, California

- Previously known as Marriott's Great America (1976–1985); Great America (1985–1992; 2007); Paramount's Great America (1993–2006)
- Logo used since 2008

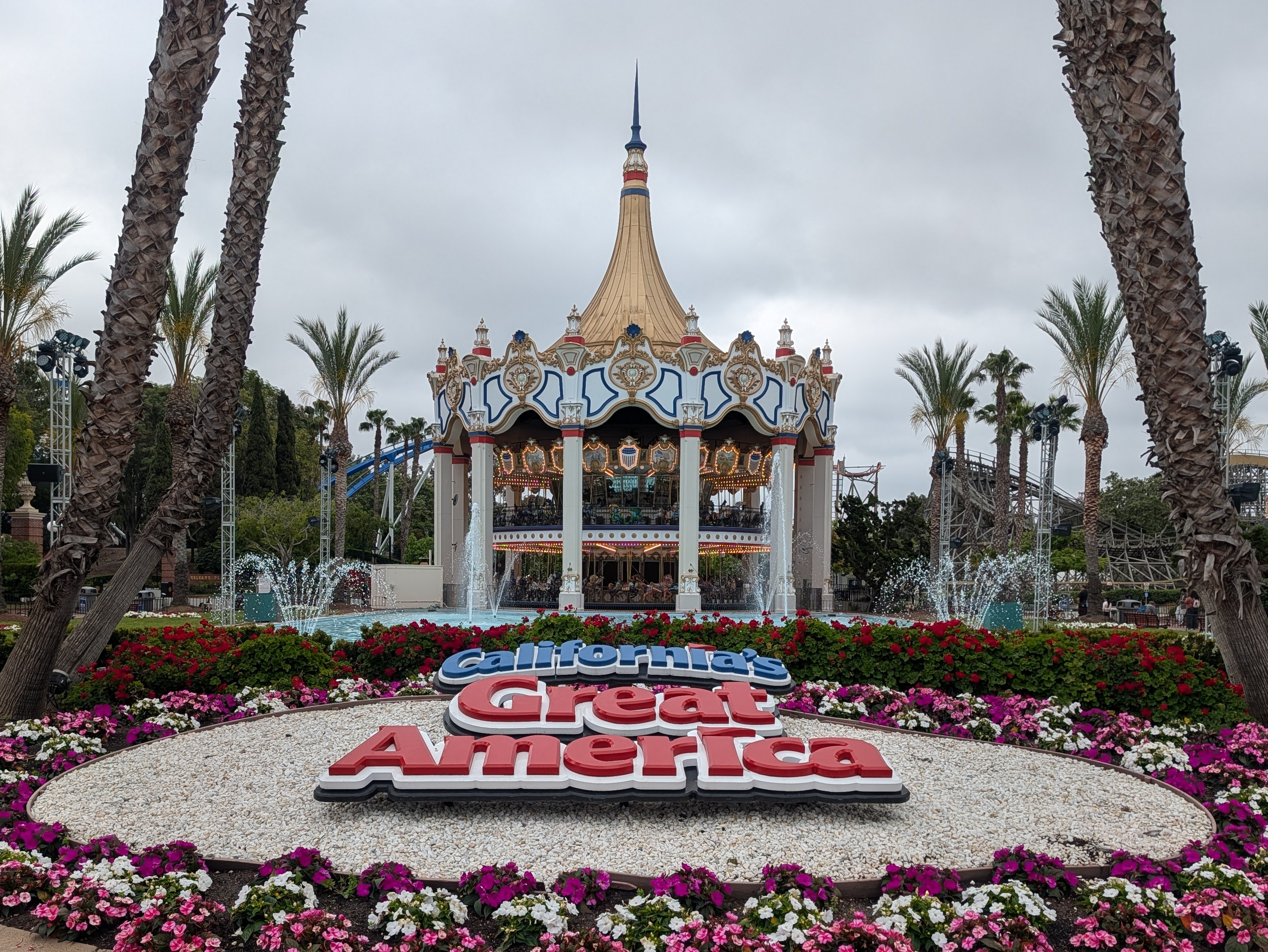
- The Carousel Columbia, the park's centerpiece attraction (pictured in 2026)
- Interactive map of California's Great America
- Location: Santa Clara, California, U.S.
- Coordinates: 37°23′45.4″N 121°58′20.1″W
- Status: Operating
- Public transit: Santa Clara–Great America; Great America
- Opened: March 20, 1976; 50 years ago
- Closed: September 6, 2027; 9 months' time
- Owner: Six Flags
- Slogan: Northern California's Home to Iconic Thrills
- Operating season: March through September
- Area: 112 acres (45 ha)

Attractions
- Total: 42 (as of 2024)
- Roller coasters: 9
- Water rides: 2
- Website: sixflags.com/cagreatamerica

California's Great America is an amusement park located in Santa Clara, California, United States, within the San Francisco Bay Area. Owned and operated by Six Flags, the park features more than 40 attractions, including nine roller coasters and a water park named South Bay Shores. The park opened on March 20, 1976, as one of two near-identical Americana-themed parks developed by the Marriott Corporation; the other park being Six Flags Great America in Illinois. The park's land is owned by Prologis and leased back to Six Flags.

Spanning 112 acres (45 ha), California's Great America is divided into six themed sections, including areas based on Americana and a children's area themed around the Peanuts character Snoopy. The park operates seasonally from March to November, but has not hosted a Halloween- or Holiday-themed annual event since 2024. Featured attractions within the park include Gold Striker, which has ranked as a top wooden roller coaster in the world by Amusement Today and RailBlazer, a unique single-rail roller coaster. It has been featured in popular culture such as the films Beverly Hills Cop III and Getting Even with Dad.

Following its opening, its ownership has transitioned multiple times, beginning with Marriott's sale of the park's land to the city of Santa Clara in 1985, with Kings Entertainment Company operating the park in 1989. Paramount Parks acquired the park in 1992, and Cedar Fair later took ownership of it in 2006, acquiring the park's land in 2019. This land was sold to Prologis in 2022 and leased back to Cedar Fair (now merged into Six Flags) for six years through June 2028 or 2033 if extended. On November 6, 2026, Six Flags announced that California’s Great America would be permanently closing on September 6, 2027.

== History ==
=== 1976–1985: Marriott Corporation ===
The hotel and restaurant operator Marriott Corporation completed Marriott's Great America on the site of what had been a pear orchard and opened it to the public on March 20, 1976. Admission was US$7.95 (equivalent to $45 in 2025) for adults (12 and up) and US$6.95 (equivalent to $39 in 2025) for children (4–11). There were 1,500 employees.

Less than two months later, on May 29, the company opened a second Marriott's Great America – later known as Six Flags Great America – north of Chicago in Gurnee, Illinois. A third park was initially planned for the Baltimore–Washington metropolitan area, but the idea was later abandoned after several failed attempts to sway local opposition.

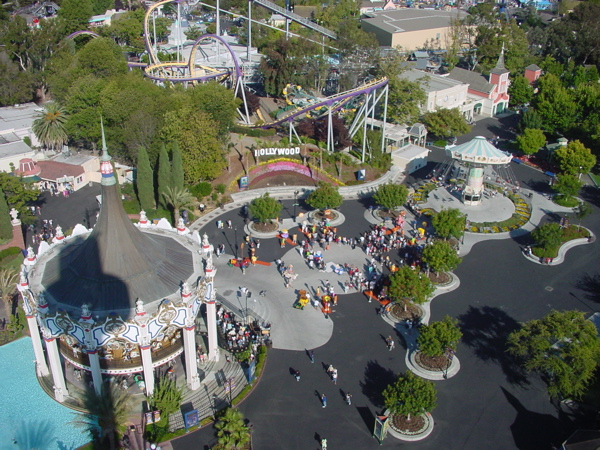
View of California's Great America from above

The park, though profitable, was still an earnings disappointment for Marriott, leading the company in 1983 to explore options to sell. An interested party, Caz Development Co., appraised the land value at US$800,000 to $1 million per 1-acre (4,000 m^{2}). Marriott also involved the city of Santa Clara in negotiations, which was already leasing 55 acres (22 ha) of parking space for the amusement park. Fearing homebuilding on the land by Caz Development would lower home values of existing homeowners, the city council approved a $101 million purchasing agreement on January 31, 1984, by a 4–3 vote that also had to be approved by city residents. The citywide vote passed, approving the sale by a margin of 3 to 1. Caz Development then sued the city and Marriott in the Superior Court of Santa Clara County to block the transaction. The court nullified the sale, forcing the city to attempt to salvage the deal through negotiations with the other parties.

=== 1985–1992: City and Kings ===
Unable to broker a timely agreement, the city council voted 6–1 to scuttle the sale on February 5, 1985, though the city was still interested in owning the park. After Marriott refunded a $20 million down payment back to the city, negotiations were restarted. All parties were able to agree on a compromise, which was signed in marathon sessions taking place in early June 1985. The city acquired the park for $93.5 million from Marriott, which retained 20 acres (8.1 ha) from the sale for development. Caz Development settled and was allowed to build a hotel and office near the park, which the city renamed Great America.

Kings Entertainment Company, who owned and operated other amusement parks, was hired in 1985 to manage Great America for the city. In 1989, the city sold the park to Kings Entertainment, while retaining ownership of the land that the park occupied. In the agreement, the city would earn 5% of all revenue that exceeds $56 million.

=== 1992–2006: Paramount Parks ===
Three years later, Paramount Communications (formerly Gulf+Western), the parent company of Paramount Pictures, sought to join other entertainment companies as a theme park owner. The company acquired Kings Entertainment for $400 million on July 31, 1992, and created Paramount Parks. As part of the acquisition, Paramount purchased the parks owned by Kings: Great America, Kings Dominion, Carowinds, and a 20% stake in Canada's Wonderland; in addition, Paramount would acquire Kings Island, which was operated by Kings for its owner, American Financial Corporation. Viacom, the parent of MTV Networks (including Nickelodeon), then assumed control of Paramount in 1994 by purchasing a controlling interest, allowing Nickelodeon theming and merchandise into the park as well. During the Paramount era, attractions from the Action FX Theatre, Nickelodeon Splat City (later Nickelodeon Central), Drop Zone Stunt Tower, Invertigo, and many more modern thrill ride attractions were added in. Because the park is constrained from further expansion by its location in the center of Silicon Valley, several rides including the classic train ride and the Sky Whirl, a Marriott's Great America signature attraction, were removed to make way for newer attractions.

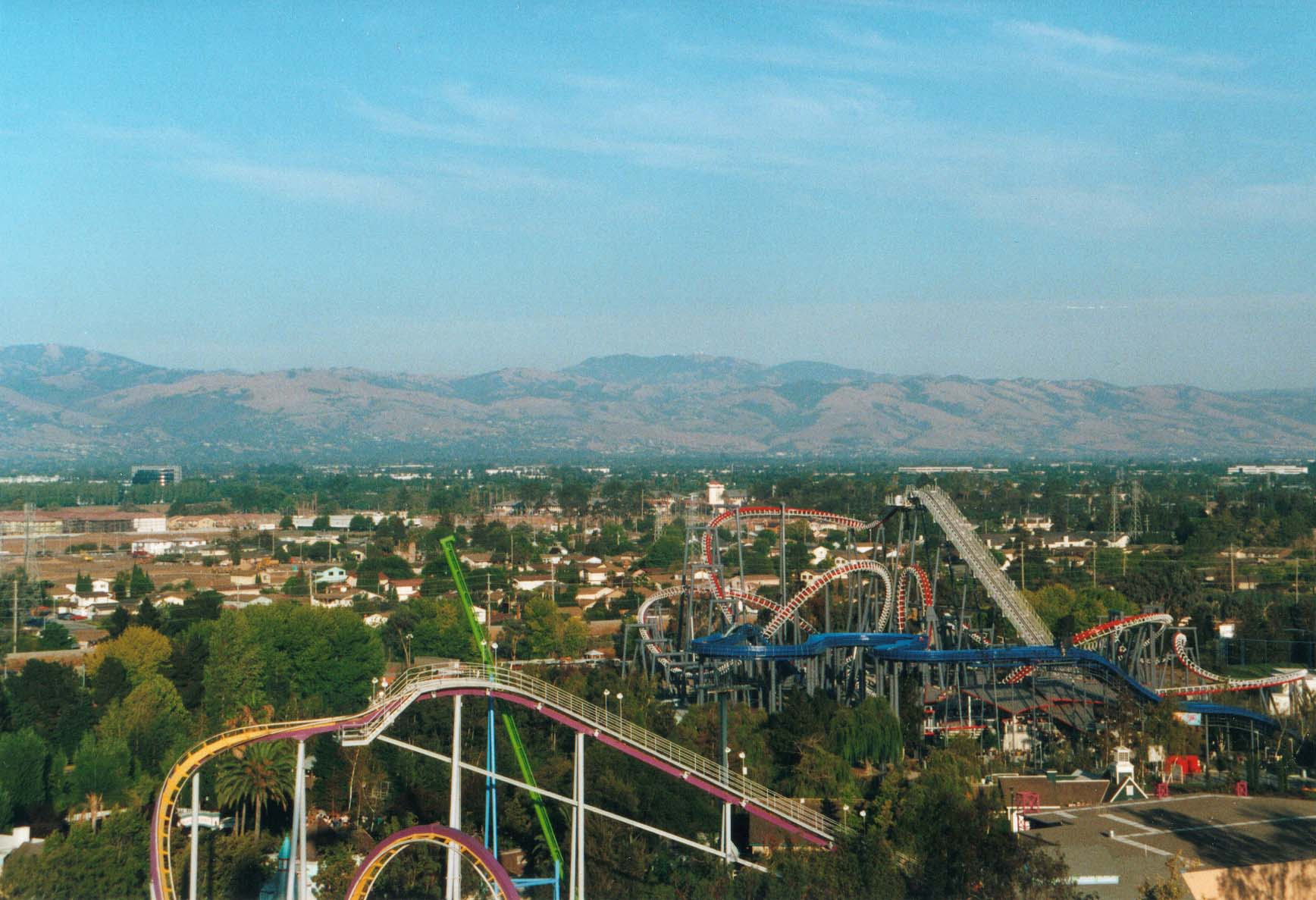
Aerial view of the park in 2000

Viacom went on to acquire CBS in 1999, which made the combined Viacom/CBS the parent company of Great America and several broadcasting affiliates in the Bay Area, including KPIX-TV (CBS) and KBHK-TV (UPN). Viacom/CBS split in 2005, with the re-formed CBS Corporation assuming control of Paramount Parks, until CBS sold that unit to Cedar Fair in 2006.

=== 2006–present: Cedar Fair/Six Flags and eventual closure ===
After Viacom and CBS Corporation split, Paramount Parks became a subsidiary of CBS. The theme park division was promptly put up for sale by CBS. In May 2006, Cedar Fair announced its acquisition of Paramount Parks.

Despite having a license agreement in place to retain Nickelodeon and Paramount branding for several years, Cedar Fair opted to remove them sooner. For the 2007 season, Paramount was dropped from the park's name, reducing it to Great America. The following season, Cedar Fair renamed it California's Great America in recognition of the park's original name. A Huss Rides top spin ride called FireFall was added that year, along with a new ice show in the Great America Theatre that was formerly called Paramount Theatre. Halloween Haunt, a Halloween-themed event held every weekend through the fall, also debuted at the park in 2008. The remaining Nickelodeon themes were replaced with characters and themes from Peanuts, a syndicated comic strip by Charles M. Schulz, for the 2010 season. The children's area was renamed Planet Snoopy. Similar changes were made at other Cedar Fair properties around the country.

On September 19, 2011, Cedar Fair confirmed reports that California's Great America would be sold to JMA Ventures, LLC for $70 million in cash. The sale required approval by the City of Santa Clara, and its city council was scheduled to vote on the matter on December 6, 2011. Cedar Fair, which purchased the park in 2006, expected to use the cash proceeds from the sale to reduce its senior secured debt. However, on December 6, 2011, JMA Ventures cancelled its plans to purchase the amusement park. In the same announcement, Cedar Fair also verified that a long-term agreement was reached with the San Francisco 49ers regarding parking and construction of a new stadium adjacent to Great America. Cedar Fair purchased the land beneath Great America from the city of Santa Clara in March 2019. The city retained the main parking lot in sale, which is shared between Levi's Stadium and Great America.

California's Great America did not operate in 2020 in response to the COVID-19 pandemic and two stay-at-home orders issued by California Governor Gavin Newsom. It reopened on May 22, 2021, initially in a limited capacity, where face masks and social distancing were required. Also in 2021, the Boomerang Bay water park reopened as South Bay Shores, featuring new water slides in several areas of the park.

In June 2022, Cedar Fair announced the sale of the land occupied by California's Great America for $310 million to Prologis, a Bay Area logistics real estate company. Cedar Fair stated that the sale will help them lower the company's corporate debt to $2 billion, adding that they intended to close the park by 2033. The terms of the agreement involve Prologis leasing the land for an initial period of six years through June 30, 2028, with the option to renew the lease for an additional five years, although Prologis could terminate Cedar Fair's lease with as little as two years' notice. After lease expiration, park operations must cease and all attractions must be removed from the property. The mayor of Santa Clara, Lisa M. Gilmor, released a statement saying that the city only found out about the sale when the public did, that city officials planned to speak with Prologis to learn more details, and that the land is zoned for "theme park" use only.

In April 2023, the park updated its website to require visitors aged under 16 to be accompanied by a chaperone aged at least 21 in order to remain in the park after 4:00 pm.

On July 1, 2024, a merger of equals between Cedar Fair and Six Flags was completed, creating Six Flags Entertainment Corporation. This made California's Great America part of the same company as both its former sister park Six Flags Great America in Gurnee, Illinois, and its San Francisco Bay Area rival Six Flags Discovery Kingdom.

During a May 2025 investor meeting, Six Flags chief financial officer Brian Witherow stated that California's Great America was "very low on the ranking of margins", there were no current plans to extend its lease from 2028 to 2033, and that the "park's last year without that extension would be after the 2027 season". The company later clarified in a July 2025 statement that no final decision has been made yet on whether to extend the lease and "we are still in the planning stages and are working with stakeholders and engaging the community".

A website with a petition, titled "Save Great America" went online in May 2026. On November 6, 2026, the park announced via the Six Flags blog that the 2027 season would be the park's last. The park is expected to close on September 6, 2027.

== Mascots ==
At the park's opening in 1976, the park featured appearances from Looney Tunes characters, including Bugs Bunny. After Marriott sold the Gurnee park to the Six Flags corporation, the rights to the Looney Tunes characters passed along to them, and the 1984 season was their final one. The park began using Hanna-Barbera properties in 1985, including The Smurfs, Scooby-Doo, and Yogi Bear. Following the acquisition of the KECO parks by Paramount Pictures, the Hanna-Barbera characters would remain under a licensing agreement with Turner until the end of the 2009 season. The park began using characters from Nickelodeon shows in 1995, following Paramount's acquisition by Viacom a year prior. Characters from shows such as SpongeBob SquarePants, Rugrats, The Wild Thornberrys, and Dora the Explorer were prominently featured in rides and shows around the park, as were other Nickelodeon characters. After the park was acquired by Cedar Fair (now Six Flags), who held a license for Peanuts characters, the children's area was rethemed as Planet Snoopy.

== Attractions by type ==
Intensity rating (out of 5)
1 (low) 2 (mild) 3 (moderate) 4 (high) 5 (aggressive)

Note: Number ratings assigned per California's Great America, while the colors are unique to Wikipedia. For more details, refer to the California's Great America Guest Assistance Guide.

=== Roller coasters ===
Name	Image	Location	Manufacturer	Opened	Rating	Description
Demon		NorCal County Fair	Arrow Dynamics	1976	5	A custom looping roller coaster. Originally known as Turn of the Century.
Flight Deck		Orleans Place	Bolliger & Mabillard	1993	5	An inverted roller coaster. Originally known as Top Gun.
Gold Striker	Gold Striker Roller Coaster at Great America	Celebration Plaza	Great Coasters International	2013	4	A wooden twister roller coaster themed to the California gold rush.
The Grizzly		NorCal County Fair	Curtis D. Summers	1986	4	A wooden double out-and-back roller coaster.
Lucy's Crabbie Cabbies		Planet Snoopy	E&F Miler Industries	1999	2	A family roller coaster themed to Lucy Van Pelt from Peanuts.
Patriot		Hometown Square	Bolliger & Mabillard	1991 (2017)	5	A Floorless Coaster, originally used stand-up trains and was named Vortex.
Psycho Mouse		NorCal County Fair	Arrow Dynamics	2001	4	A wild mouse style roller coaster.
RailBlazer		NorCal County Fair	Rocky Mountain Construction	2018	5	A "Raptor" model single-rail roller coaster that dives under rockwork.
Woodstock Express		Planet Snoopy	Intamin	1987	3	A children's roller coaster themed to Woodstock from Peanuts. Originally relocated from Hanna-Barbera Land Houston, where it was known as Scooby-Doo.

=== Thrill rides ===
Name	Image	Location	Manufacturer	Model Name	Opened	Rating
Delirium		All American Corners	Chance Rides	Revolution 32	2002	5
Drop Tower		NorCal County Fair	Intamin	Giant Drop	1996	4
Orbit		All American Corners	Schwarzkopf	Enterprise	1976	4
Thunder Raceway		NorCal County Fair		Go Kart Ride	2001	4
Tiki Twirl		NorCal County Fair	Zamperla	Disk'O Coaster	2006	4
Xtreme Skyflyer		Hometown Square	Skycoaster	Skycoaster	1997	4

== Park areas ==
Themed areas within California's Great America

Redwood Amphitheater, also called Great America Amphitheater, is 10,000 person outdoor venue at Great America in Santa Clara, California.

The park is divided into several themed areas, laid out along an oval pathway nicknamed the "Duell Loop", which the park's designer, Randall Duell, had incorporated into several theme parks, including the Six Flags Great America sister park in Gurnee. This allows all areas of the park to be serviced from a central corridor, while visitors can experience the entire park by completing a single lap around it. In aerial photographs, the central service corridor in the Santa Clara park is visible as a straight road running almost directly north–south, terminating under the Patriot roller coaster. At the park's opening in 1976, there were five themed areas:

- Orleans Place, representing the old South
- Yankee Harbor, representing an early 19th-century Eastern seaboard village
- Yukon Territory, representing the Klondike Gold Rush
- The Great Midwest Livestock Exposition and County Fair, representing the early 20th century
- Hometown Square, representing a small American town in the 1920s

From the main entrance, visitors enter Celebration Plaza (originally Carousel Plaza); proceeding clockwise (turning left after passing Carousel Columbia), the themed areas are:

- Orleans Place (restoring the original name; an interim name was Pavilion Plaza)
- All American Corners (consolidating the original Yankee Harbor and Yukon Territory; previously known as All American Plaza)
- Planet Snoopy (originally Fort Fun; intermediate brands included Kids Kingdom, Smurf Woods, KidZville, and Nickelodeon Central)
- NorCal County Fair
- Hometown Square (restoring the original name; it had been incorporated into Celebration Plaza)

The entrance to the South Bay Shores water park is in All American Corners, near the bridge to Planet Snoopy. Typical visitor guide maps show the main entrance, which is in the northwest corner of the park, at the bottom of the map.

=== All American Corners ===
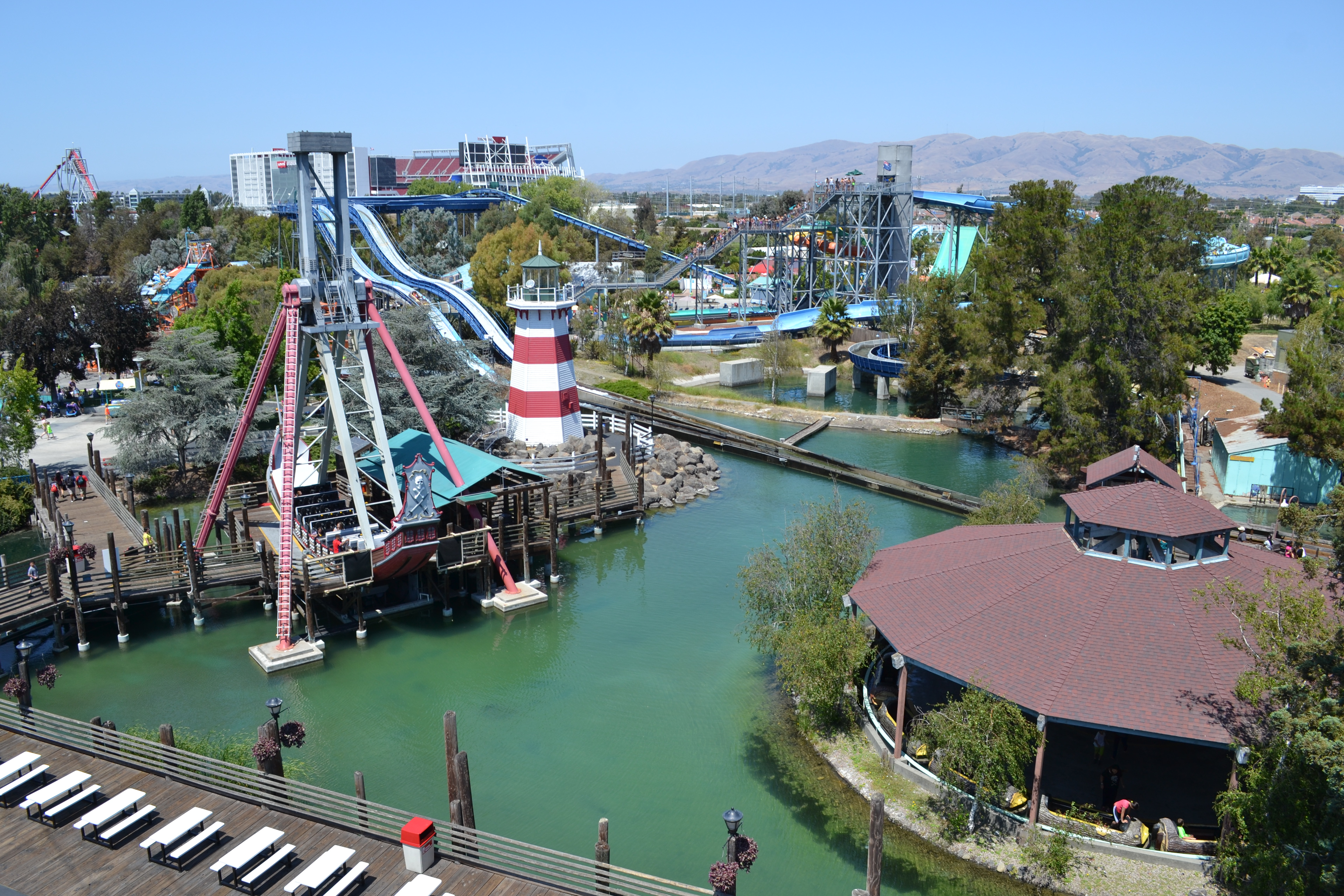
Aerial view of the former Yukon Territory and Yankee Harbor (2017) from the Eagle's Flight/Delta Flyer Von Roll skyride; the Logger's Run log flume loading carousel is prominent in the right foreground, while the HMB Endeavor Looping Starship and lighthouse are on the left. A large waterslide for Boomerang Bay can be seen in the background.

All American Plaza was formed by consolidating Yankee Harbor, Yukon Territory, and the southern portion of Orleans Place. These areas were delineated by covered bridges: Yankee Harbor was between the covered bridges leading to Orleans Place to the north and Fort Fun on the south, while Yukon Territory was separated from Yankee Harbor by a boardwalk next to The Revolution (later H.M.B. Endeavor) Looping Starship ride and lighthouse; another covered bridge led from Yukon Territory to County Fair, which is now part of Action Zone.

The signature rides in Yankee Harbor and Yukon Territory were the interlocking log flumes, which shared the same space on the east side of the park and had an entrance in each areas, flanking The Revolution and lighthouse. Much of what was Yukon Territory was renamed Nickelodeon Central by 2003, which was an extension of the Fort Fun/KidZville children's area.

This area was renamed All American Corners by 2009. The expansion of South Bay Shores in 2019–20 annexed a portion of All American Corners, including the lighthouse replica that was next to The Revolution/HMB Endeavor.

In 2022, the park introduced Liberty Twirler, a new Scrambler ride. A new show, The Corner Notes, was also introduced.

Ride	Image	Opened	Manufacturer	Model	Notes	Rating
Delirium		2002	Chance Rides	Revolution 32	Designed by KMG of the Netherlands.	5
Flying Eagles		2002	Larson International	Flying Scooters	Cars can reach an overall height of 28 feet (8.5 m) during ride operation.	3
Liberty Twirler	Liberty Twirler with Sign	2022	Eli Bridge Company	Scrambler	A classic scrambler ride.	3
Mass Effect: New Earth		2016 (1994)	Iwerks Entertainment	4-D Theater	Originally 'Action Theater' with several shows on two screens; debuted in March 1994 with Days of Thunder.	3
Orbit		1976	Schwarzkopf	Enterprise	Originally the Orleans Orbit.	4
Rip Roaring Rapids		1988	Intamin	Rapids Ride	Riders careen through the concrete channels in 6-person rafts while facing rapids, whirlpools, and waterfalls.	4

=== Celebration Plaza ===
Celebration Plaza is the park's entrance plaza, with often-photographed features including the reflecting pool, Carousel Columbia, and the park's name in flowers. By 1988, the area had been renamed Carousel Plaza and was separated from the adjoining Hometown Square by the park's perimeter railroad, which ran on an elevated track immediately behind the giant carousel. After the railroad and trolley were removed in 2000, the Hometown Square area was consolidated and renamed Celebration Plaza, although the area briefly bore the name Hollywood Plaza as well. The Hometown Square area was re-separated in 2021.

Ride	Image	Opened	Manufacturer	Model	Notes	Rating
Carousel Columbia		1976	Chance Rides	Double Decker Carousel	A double-decker carousel that has over 100 horses and stands at an overall height of 101 feet (31 m).	1
Gold Striker		2013	Great Coasters International	Wooden roller coaster	Featured as a top 50 wooden roller coaster in Amusement Today's Golden Ticket Awards	4
Star Tower		1979	Intamin	Gyro Tower	Passengers ride in a rotating cabin where it reaches a height of 200 feet (61 m) while taking in the surrounding views.	2

=== NorCal County Fair ===
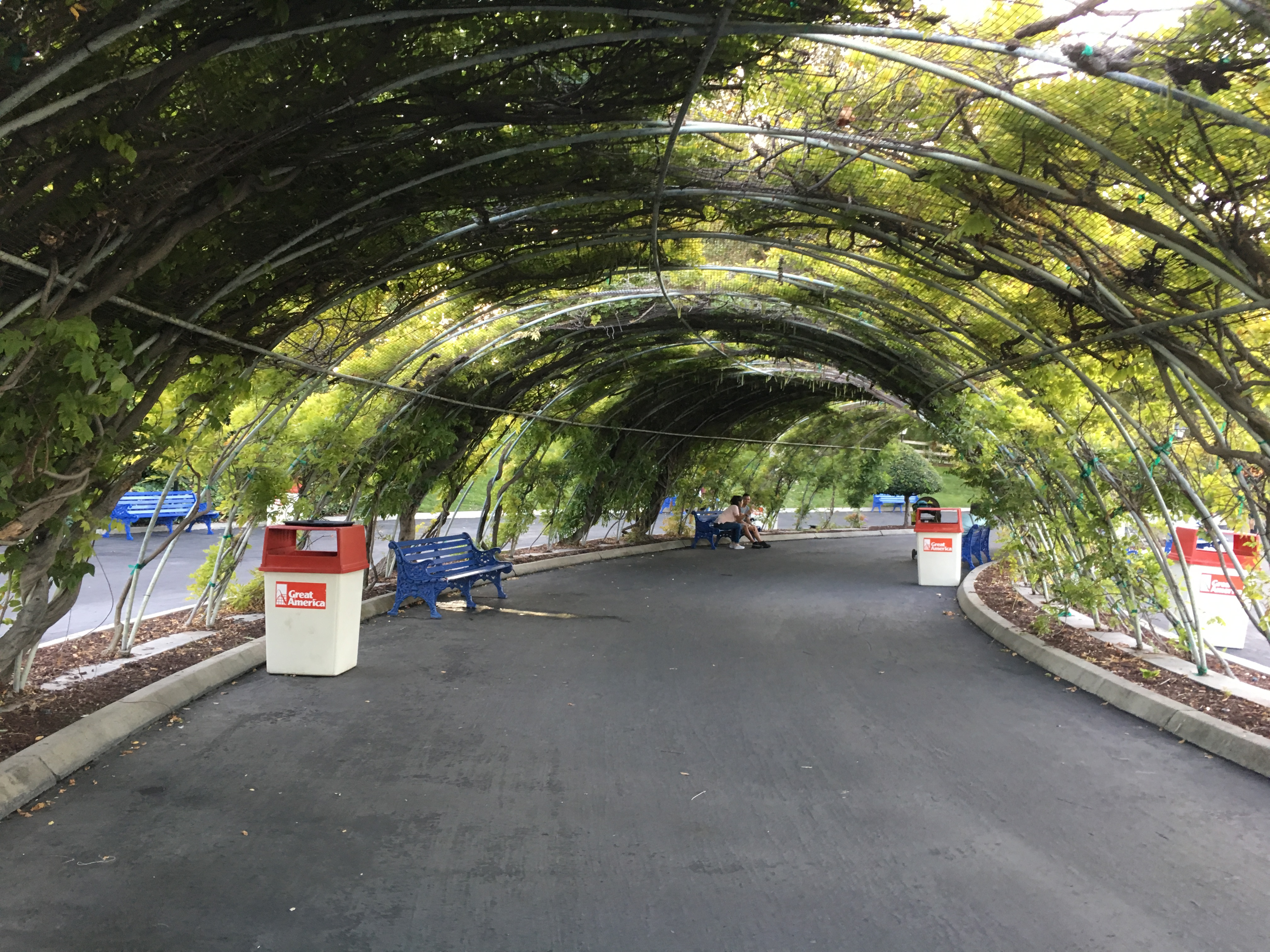
This walkway/arbor in County Fair is a prominent part of the western arm, formerly Festival Plaza (2017).

NorCal County Fair was originally named The Great Midwest Livestock Exposition and County Fair; portions of it were split off to form Action Zone and Festival Plaza, but the latter was re-annexed into County Fair later. The original area, named The Great Midwest Livestock Exposition and County Fair, occupied most of the park's southern area, extending from a covered bridge into Yukon Territory (near the Centrifuge ride) to another bridge into Hometown Square (next to Whitewater Falls). Passenger service was provided by the park's perimeter railroad from Hometown Square, which stopped at the Fairground Junction station next to the picnic grounds and The Edge ride, and the Eagle's Flight station on the park's Von Roll gondola from Orleans Place.

By 2003, the area had been divided in two, with County Fair remaining in the southern part next to Nickelodeon Central (formed from the former Yukon Territory) while the western arm had been renamed Festival Plaza; the dividing line was the semi-circular Games Gallery, which hosted typical carnival games. By 2009, the former County Fair at the park's southern end was renamed the Action Zone, while Festival Plaza assumed the County Fair name.

In early 2011, the park made the decision to relocate Invertigo to another Cedar Fair property, Dorney Park & Wildwater Kingdom, stating that it was necessary to make room for a future attraction. RailBlazer, a single-rail roller coaster, eventually opened in its place in 2018.

On May 4, 2023, the park announced the retheme of Action Zone and County Fair to NorCal County Fair. This retheme included a revamped Games Gallery, general area revamping, new Zamperla WindstarZ flat ride "Pacific Gliders" and overhauled and rethemed Barney Oldfield's Speedway to Barney Oldfield's Redwood Rally. (Formerly Action Zone, rebranded in 2023) was divided from The Great Midwest Livestock Exposition and County Fair. Pacific Gliders opened on August 13, 2023. The park held a season passholder preview on August 12, 2023.

Ride	Image	Opened	Manufacturer	Model	Notes	Rating
Barney Oldfield's Redwood Rally		1976	Arrow Dynamics	Antique Car ride	Passengers ride in old-styled cars on a track around the Grizzly. Originally called Barney Oldfield Speedway (1976–2022).	2
Berserker		1976	Schwarzkopf	Bayern Kurve	Originally known as Yukon Yahoo.	3
Centrifuge		1976	Schwarzkopf	Calypso	Originally known as Fiddler's Fling. Its Six Flags Great America counterpart retains that name as of today.	3
Drop Tower		1996	Intamin	Giant Drop	A 227 ft-tall (69 m) tower where riders descend at speeds up to 100 km/h (62 mph) while free falling in cars that hold up to four passengers. Originally known as Drop Zone: Stunt Tower from 1996 to 2007.	4
Demon		1976	Arrow Dynamics	Looping Coaster	Originally opened as "Turn of the Century" in 1976. Reconfigured and renamed "Demon" in 1980.	5
Eagle's Flight		1976	Von Roll	Gondola lift	Eagle's Flight is the name for the Action Zone gondola station	3
Pacific Gliders		2023	Zamperla	Windstar		3
Psycho Mouse		2001	Arrow Dynamics	Wild mouse roller coaster	The last Mad Mouse to be produced by Arrow Dynamics.	4
RailBlazer		2018	Rocky Mountain Construction	Single Rail	Replaced Invertigo, a roller coaster which closed on January 27, 2011	5
The Grizzly		1986	Kings Island	Wooden roller coaster	Modeled after the original Coney Island Wildcat.	4
Thunder Raceway		2001		Go-kart track	Pay-per ride attraction.	4
Tiki Twirl		2006	Zamperla	Disk'O	Originally known as Survivor: The Ride! from 2006 to 2011.	4

=== Hometown Square ===
Hometown Square was annexed into Celebration Plaza, but was restored to a separate area later. Transportation within the park was provided by the perimeter railroad, which had one station in Hometown Square adjacent to Carousel Columbia connecting to a second station in County Fair where the Psycho Mouse roller coaster is today, and also by the trolley system, which ran in a square loop around the eponymous square in front of the Great America Theater, routed via Carousel Plaza through Orleans Place, where it terminated in another loop near where the Flying Eagles ride is today.

After the park's perimeter railroad and trolley were removed, the Hometown Square area was combined with Celebration Plaza by 2003; the areas were divided again by 2021.

Ride	Image	Opened	Manufacturer	Model	Notes	Rating
Celebration Swings		2001	Zierer	Wave swinger	Originally operated at Carowinds as Whirling Dervish from 1979 to 2000.	3
Patriot		2017 (1991)	B&M	Floorless coaster	A floorless coaster where passengers descend down a 91 ft (28 m) drop at speeds of up to 45 mph (72 km/h) while navigating through one loop and a corkscrew along the 1,920 ft (590 m) track. Formerly known as Vortex from 1991 to 2016 as a stand-up roller coaster.	5
Whitewater Falls		1990	Intamin	Spillwater	A shoot-the-chutes water ride where 20 passengers sit in a large boat that eventually descends down a 50 ft (15 m) drop at up to 44 mph (71 km/h), creating a 20-foot-tall (6.1 m) wave.	4
Xtreme Skyflyer		1997	Skycoaster	Skycoaster	Pay-per-ride attraction.	4

=== Orleans Place ===
Orleans Place was renamed Pavilion Plaza at one point, reflecting its entrance to the picnic area named Great America Pavilion. Originally, Orleans Place extended from Celebration/Carousel Plaza to a covered bridge leading to Yankee Harbor and was divided in half by the perimeter railroad; the portion south of the railroad (including the trolley station/loop and the Orleans Orbit and Rip Roaring Rapids rides, approximately where Pizza Orleans is today) was annexed into All American Plaza when that area was formed by consolidating Yankee Village and Yukon Territory by 2003. The site of the trolley station/loop is now marked by the "1950s gazebo" in All American Corners. as a result of this land separation, the 'Orleans Orbit' was renamed, now being located in ' all American Corners' the ride is now known as simply 'Orbit.'

Ride	Image	Opened	Manufacturer	Model	Notes	Rating
Delta Flyer		1976	Von Roll	Gondola line	Delta Flyer is the name for the Orleans Place station.	3
Flight Deck		1993	Bolliger & Mabillard	Inverted roller coaster	Formerly known as Top Gun. Maximum speed 50 mph (80 km/h).	5
Rue Le Dodge		1976	Soli	Bumper Cars	A classic bumper car ride.	4

=== Planet Snoopy ===
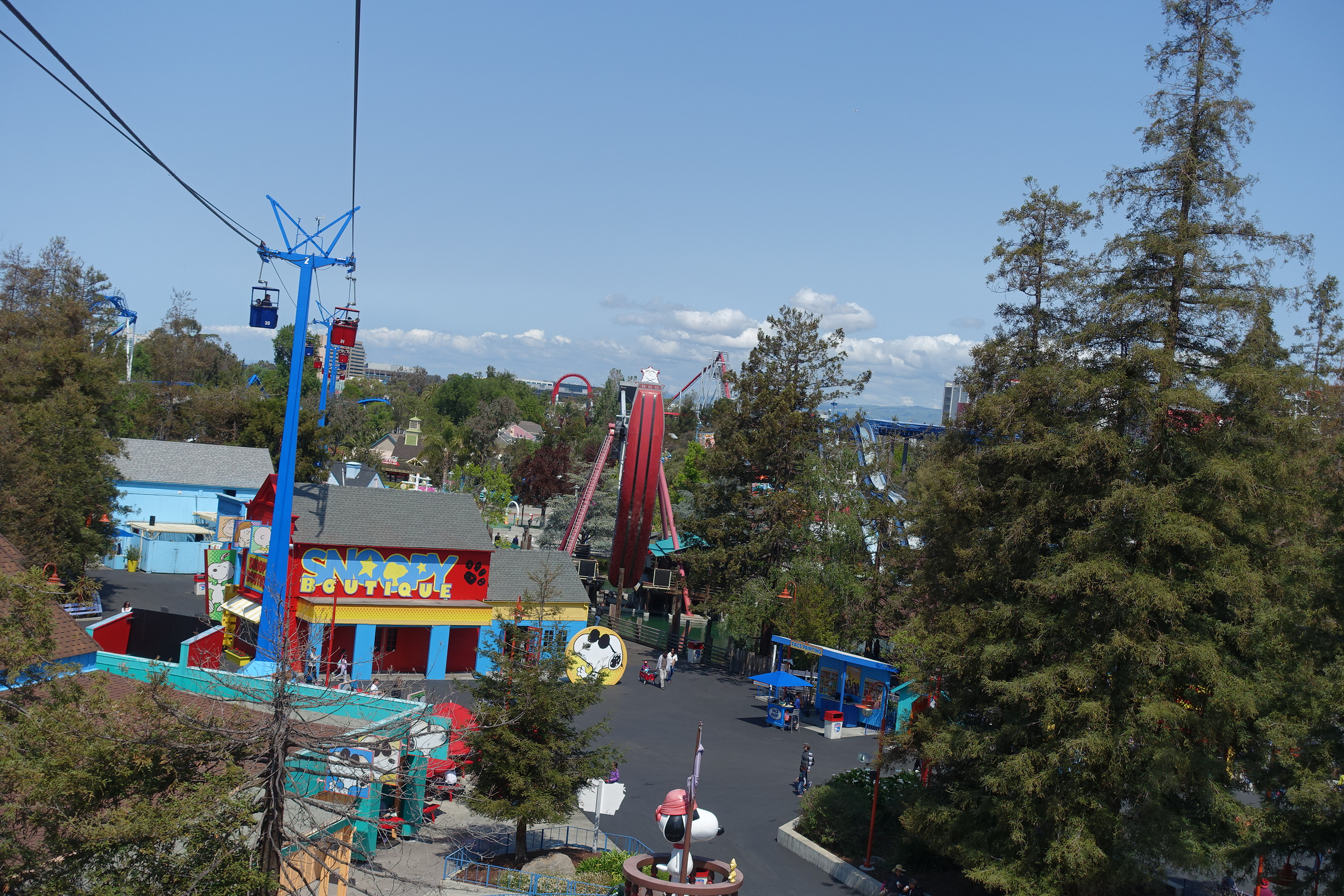
The original Fort Fun area (now Planet Snoopy) in 2017, from the Eagle's Flight/Delta Flyer Von Roll skyride

Planet Snoopy is California's Great America's kids area, which opened in 2010. The area was originally named Fort Fun and has seen the most name changes as brand licenses were updated following multiple ownership changes, including Kids Kingdom, Smurf Woods, Nickelodeon Central, and KidZville.

The original Fort Fun was a 1 acre (0.40 ha) area for children located in the center of the park, accessible only by footbridges over water from Yukon Territory. Smurf Woods opened in 1987 and was physically separated from Fort Fun by Yukon Territory.

By 1999, the water physically separating Fort Fun from Yukon Territory had been filled and by 2003, Smurf Woods had been replaced by Nickelodeon Central, which had annexed much of the former Yukon Territory and was adjoining Fort Fun, which had been renamed KidZville. The Nickelodeon Central area was renamed Planet Snoopy in 2010 and by 2016, the Planet Snoopy area had expanded to its present size by annexing the former KidZville/Fort Fun children's area.

Ride	Image	Opened	Manufacturer	Model	Notes	Rating
Planet Snoopy Construction Zone		2014		Playground	Originally known as KidZ Construction Co.	1
Character Carousel		1976		Carousel	Previously included Hanna-Barbera characters	1
Flying Ace		1999	Zamperla	Crazy Bus	Originally known as KidzAir	2
GR8 SK8		2015	Interactive Rides	Sky Skater	Originally at Knott's Berry Farm as Joe Cool's GR8 SK8.	3
Joe Cool's Dodgem School		1999		Kiddie bumper cars	Originally known as Fender Bender 500.	2
Kite-Eating Tree		1999	S&S Worldwide	Frog Hopper	Originally known as Junior Jump Club.	2
Lucy's Crabbie Cabbie		1999	E&F Miler	Kiddie roller coaster	Originally known as Taxi Jam.	2
Peanuts 500		2015			Originally operated at Knott's Berry Farm as Charlie Brown's Speedway.	2
PEANUTS Pirates		2003	Huss	Breakdance 4	Originally known as SpongeBob's Boat Mobiles.	2
Sally's Love Buggies		2003			Originally known as Dora's Dune Buggies	2
Sally's Swing Set				Family Wave Swinger	Originally known as Swing Swing Swing	2
Snoopy's Space Buggies		2015	Zamperla	Jump Around		2
Snoopy's Space Race		1976			Originally known as Buzzy Bee and later Ghost Chasers.	1
The Pumpkin Patch		2003			Originally known as Wild Thornberry's Treetop Lookout	2
Woodstock Express		1987	Intamin	Steel roller coaster	Originally known as Blue Streak, Rugrats Runaway Reptar	3

=== South Bay Shores ===
A video of South Bay Shores (then Boomerang Bay)

South Bay Shores is a water park located within California's Great America that opened in 2004 as Crocodile Dundee's Boomerang Bay. The name was later shortened to just Boomerang Bay in 2007. In August 2019, it was announced that Boomerang Bay would be expanded and renamed South Bay Shores. Access to the water park is included with the price of admission to California's Great America.

== Time Capsule ==
A time capsule was buried at then Paramount's Great America in the former KidZville area of the park on March 29, 2002. The time capsule is set to open on March 29, 2152. The time capsule reads, "At this site is buried a time capsule with essays by students in second through twelfth grades in the Santa Clara Unified School District and other local schools. What will the next 150 years in Santa Clara be like? In honor of the City of Santa Clara's sesquicentennial 1852-2002."

== Defunct attractions ==
Before the park's closure on September 6, 2027, past rides and attractions included:

Ride	Image	Opened	Manufacturer, type	Location	Closed	Notes	Rating
H.M.B. Endeavor		1987	Intamin Looping Starship	All American Plaza (later All American Corners)	2017	Removed after the 2017 season. Now a grass picnic area Originally named The Revolution.	4
Snoopy's Splash Dance			Kiddie splash walk-through	Planet Snoopy	2017	Removed after the 2017 season due to an expansion of South Bay Shores	N/A
Logger's Run		1976	log flume	All American Plaza (later All American Corners)	2017	Removed after the 2017 season due to an expansion of South Bay Shores	4
Firefall		2008	HUSS Park Attractions Top Spin	All American Plaza (later All American Corners)	2016	Relocated from Geauga Lake, where it had been named Texas Twister; unexpectedly closed following the 2016 season. Replaced by Liberty Twirler.	5
Vortex		1991	Bolliger & Mabillard stand-up roller coaster	Hometown Square	2016	Converted into a Floorless Coaster called Patriot for 2017	5
Invertigo		1998	Vekoma inverted shuttle coaster	Festival Plaza (later County Fair)	2011	The first of its kind in North America; relocated to Dorney Park until its closure in 2018.	5
Stealth		2000	Vekoma flying roller coaster	All American Plaza (later All American Corners)	2003	Tested in 1999; relocated to Carowinds in 2004 and renamed Nighthawk to make way for Boomerang Bay	
Great America Scenic Railway		1976	Custom 3 ft (914 mm) narrow gauge railroad	Stations in Hometown Square and County Fair	2000	Traversed the perimeter of the park	
Yankee Clipper		1976	Arrow Dynamics log flume	All American Corners (Yankee Harbor)	1998	Interlocked with Logger's Run and was removed to make room for Stealth	
Greased Lightnin'		1977	Anton Schwarzkopf Shuttle Loop roller coaster	All American Corners (Yankee Harbor)	2002	Originally called The Tidal Wave; renamed in 1999	
IMAX Pictorium Theater		1978	IMAX movie theater	Celebration Plaza	2001	First IMAX theater in California; premiered Man Belongs to the Earth.	
The Edge		1983	Intamin Freefall	Action Zone (County Fair)	1995	A first-generation Freefall ride	
Skyhawk		1989	Intamin flight trainer simulator	Hometown Square	2000	A ride located where the 3-point shot basketball game is today	
Sky Whirl		1976	Intamin Triple Tree Wheel (Ferris wheel)	County Fair	1997	Several sister rides were custom manufactured for various Marriott Corporation amusement parks	
Lobster		1976	Octopus ride	All American Corners (Yankee Harbor)	1993	Removed to make room for Action Theater	
Bottom's Up		1976	Trabant flat ride	Hometown Square	1988	A thrill ride that was replaced with Berserker formerly known as Yukon Yahoo	
Triple Play		1976	Huss Troika	Hometown Square	2004	Formerly situated next to Patriot	
Smurf Woods		1987	Kids-themed area	Now Planet Snoopy	1990s	Themed to The Smurfs	
Nickelodeon Central		1990s	Kids-themed area	Now Planet Snoopy	1997	Based on shows from Nickelodeon and the Nick Jr. Channel	
KidZville		1998	Kids-themed area	Now Planet Snoopy	2010	Incorporates themes from Hanna-Barbera after the acquisition by Paramount, including Scooby-Doo, Flintstones, and Jetsons	
Whizzer		1976	Anton Schwarzkopf steel family roller coaster	Hometown Square	1988	Originally named Willard's Whizzer	
Trolley Cars		1976	Trolley	Hometown Square and Orleans Place via Celebration Square	c.2000	Traveled to other locations within Great America	
Dolphin and Seal Show			Daily shows featuring dolphins and seals	Planet Snoopy (Fort Fun)	1989	During the Marriott era; as with other parks in the chain, the show was removed after Paramount Parks began managing park operations. The remaining structure was later converted to Peanuts Playhouse Theater	
Cajun Carpet			Huss Rainbow flat ride	Orleans Place	1989	Formerly located near Orbit and Rip Roaring Rapids.	
Gulf Coaster		1976	steel kiddie coaster	Orleans Place	1980		
Ameri-Go-Round		1976	Philadelphia Toboggan Company carousel	County Fair	1995	Replaced by Drop Tower. Originally built in 1918 for the Cincinnati Zoo; after closing at Great America, donated to Woodland Park Zoo and reopened in 2006.	
Hilltopper			Himalaya flat ride		1984	A ride that was roughly where Whitewater Falls is today	
Saskatchewan Scrambler		1976	Scrambler flat ride	Yukon Territory / County Fair	1991	Renamed Industrial Revolution after move	
Snail Races		1976	Kiddie pony cart ride	KidZville	2014	Replaced by Snoopy’s Space Buggies	
Classic Cars		1976	Hampton	KidZville	2014	Replaced by Peanuts 500	
Mr. Peeble’s Pet Shop		1976	Eyerly Ladybug	KidZVille	2014	Replaced by GR8 SK8	

== Fast Lane ==
Fast Lane, first introduced at a Cedar Fair park in July 2011, is a secondary queue system that offers shorter wait times on the park's most popular rides. Fast Lane is a system where in addition to a standard admission charge, visitors can purchase a wrist band. The band grants access to the Fast Lane queue. In theory, a limited number of wrist bands are available each day.

In 2023, the park introduced Single-Use Fast Lane, which can be used for only one time.

== Events ==
The park hosted many events throughout the year. It has been announced that there would be no seasonal events during the 2025 season.

=== Former Tricks and Treats ===

Tricks and Treats was the autumn festival at the park, which began in mid-September and ends in October. Attractions include crafts, shows, and games. The park has announced that Tricks and Treats would not return in the 2025 season.

=== Former Halloween Haunt ===
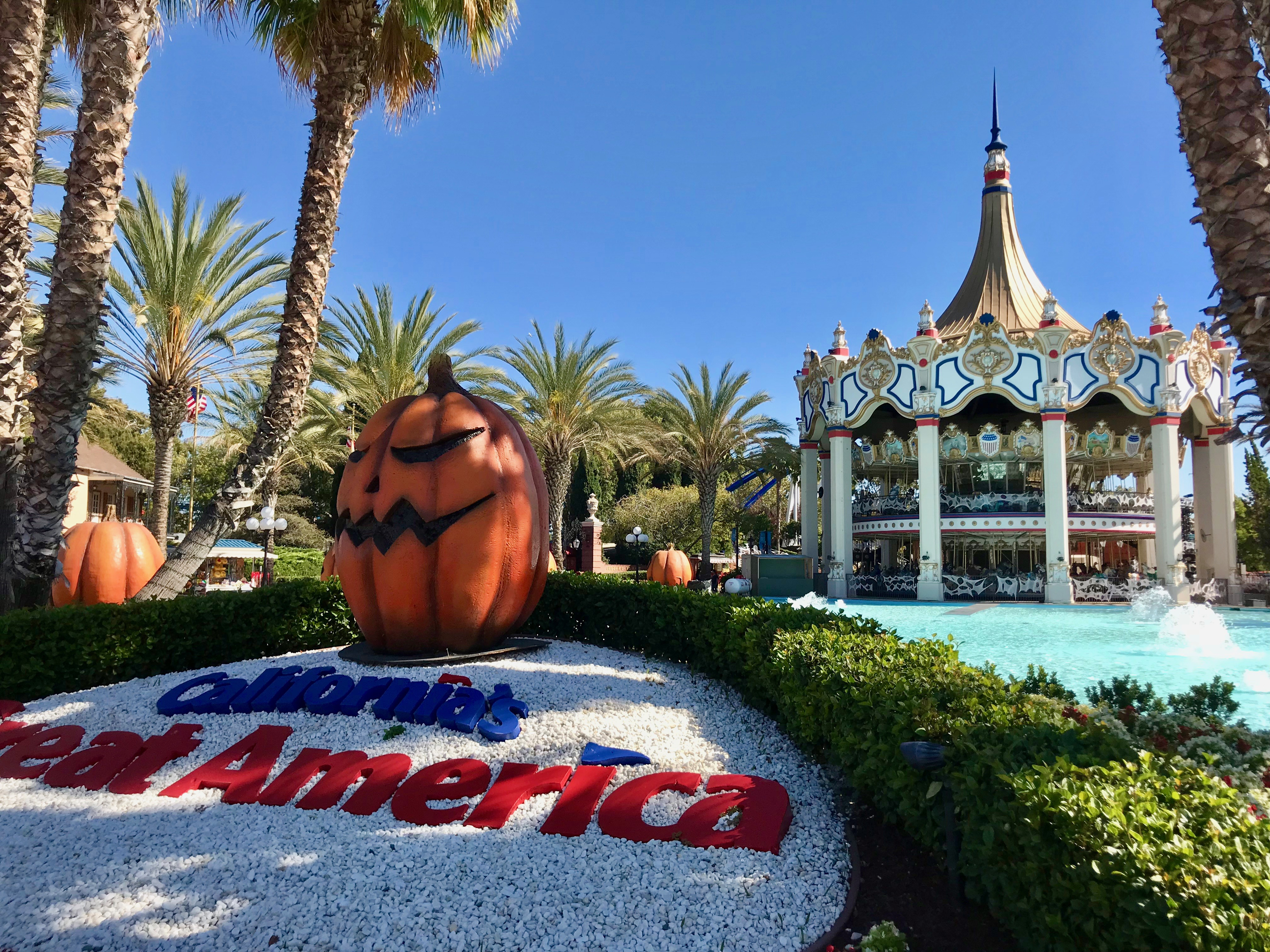
Front of park during Halloween Haunt in 2017

Halloween Haunt was a seasonal event at California's Great America, that began in the fall after the park has transitioned to weekend-only operation. It debuted in 2008 and last ran in 2021, and typically ran from mid-September through late October to coincide with Halloween, featuring haunted houses, mazes, live shows, and scare actors roaming throughout the park. Most rides and attractions remained in operation during this time, and the park's hours of operation were extended on Fridays and Saturdays. The event last operated on October 31, 2021.

On February 25, 2022, California's Great America announced that Halloween Haunt is being replaced for the 2022 season with a family-friendly, scare-free Halloween event called "Tricks and Treats". There was not be an adult, nighttime Halloween event at California's Great America after 2021 season, although the Halloween Haunt event continues to run at several other Six Flags parks.

=== Former Winterfest ===
Winterfest was the holiday event at the park, which began in mid-November and ended in Early January. It featured several winter themed attractions: shows, games, and ice skating. The park has announced that Winterfest would not return in the 2025 season.

== Park timeline ==
2020–2029
- 2027: Park to hold Farewell Season, Closing permanently on September 6
- 2026: Berserker refurbished, Gold Striker retracked
- 2025: All seasonal events cancelled
- 2024: Celebration Swings repainted, Food and Wine Festival introduced
- 2023: Peanuts Celebration introduced, NorCal County Fair re-themed, Pacific Gliders opens
- 2022: Carnivale at Orleans Place and Tricks and Treats introduced, Liberty Twirler opens, Orbit reopened after a refurbishment and repaint with 1950s designs, Halloween Haunt cancelled, announcement made of Park closure on June 27.
- 2021: Taste of Orleans introduced, South Bay Shores opened, Psycho Mouse and Woodstock Express repainted
- 2020: Park temporarily closed because of the COVID-19 pandemic
2010–2019
- 2019: Drop Tower receives new paint scheme depicting a redwood tree, Pre-K pass is introduced.
- 2018: Single-rail coaster RailBlazer debuts, Halloween Haunt and WinterFest are expanded.
- 2017: Patriot is converted to floorless, Vortex is repainted and re-themed, Halloween Haunt and Winterfest expanded. FireFall, Logger's Run, H.M.B Endeavour, Snoopy's Splash Dance, and other structures are removed.
- 2016: 4D holographic attraction themed to the video game Mass Effect debuts in newly renovated Action Theater, Winterfest event added, Halloween Haunt expansion.
- 2015: Planet Snoopy replaces KidZville
- 2014: Flight Deck repainted red and white, Grizzly retracked and has its loading area painted red and white, Fun TV monitors added to ride line queues, and new flooring in Carousel Columbia.
- 2013: New wooden coaster "Gold Striker" opens and Happy Feet: Mumble's Wild Ride debuts in the Action Theater.
- 2012: Demon and Flight Deck repainted, elevator lift entrance for Loggers Run and Vortex, The Grizzly is retracked, Fast Lane added.

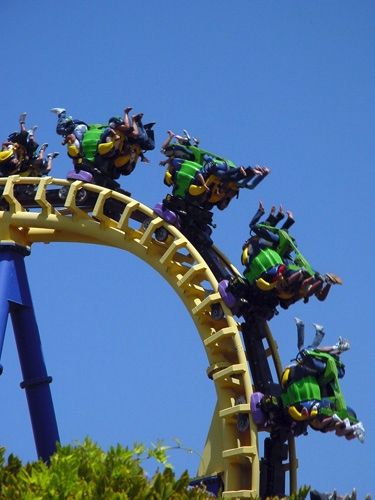
The former Invertigo coaster (Removed 2011)

- 2011: Invertigo removed and relocated to Dorney Park & Wildwater Kingdom
- 2010: Planet Snoopy replaces Nickelodeon Central, Hanna Barbera references removed in KidZville
2000–2009
- 2009: All Wheels Extreme Stunt show; Chipper Lowell Experience show
- 2008: Park renamed California's Great America; FireFall; Dora's Sing-Along Adventure; Endless Summer On Ice show; Halloween Haunt debuts
- 2007: Paramount dropped from the name, renamed Great America; Great Barrier Reef Wavepool added to Boomerang Bay; Ed Alonzo Misfit of Magic; Twistin' to the '60s Show
- 2006: Tiki Twirl (Formerly Survivor: The Ride); Park is sold to Cedar Fair
- 2005: Boomerang Bay expansion to include lazy river, two other waterslides and a large swimming pool.
- 2004: Boomerang Bay is added including a complex of children's water slides/play area, a 4-person adult raft/tube ride, a two-person inner-tube water slide and a fully enclosed two-person inner-tube water slide. Triple Play is removed. Nickelodeon Celebration Parade begins performing.
- 2003: SpongeBob SquarePants 3-D in the Action Theater; Nickelodeon Central (expansion of Splat City); Stealth (flying steel coaster) is removed and sent to Carowinds as Nighthawk
- 2002: Delirium; Flying Eagles; Greased Lightning (shuttle loop coaster) is removed; Time Capsule buried
- 2001: Psycho Mouse; Celebration Swings; Thunder Raceway; Stan Lee's seventh Portal 3D/ Smash Factory in Action Theater
- 2000: Stealth (flying steel coaster) opens to the public; Scenic Railroad and Skyhawk are removed
1990–1999
- 1999: KidZVille; Tidal Wave renamed Greased Lightnin'; Stealth is constructed and tested all season; Logger's Run modified to allow construction of Stealth

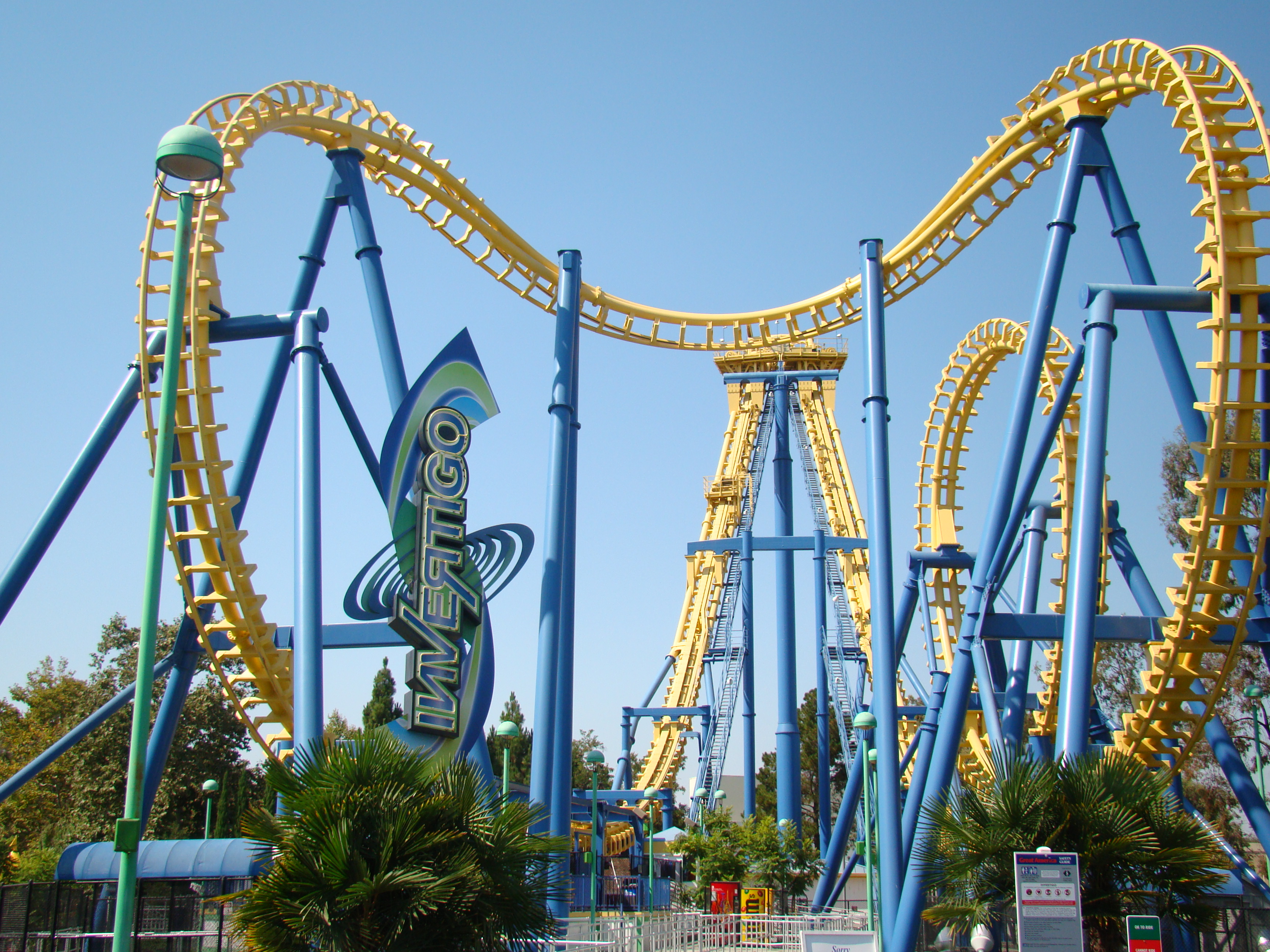
Complete View of the former Invertigo coaster

- 1998: Invertigo; James Bond: License to Thrill; in the Paramount Action F/X Theater Yankee Clipper is removed
- 1997: Xtreme Skyflyer; Triple Wheel (originally Sky Whirl) is removed
- 1996: Drop Tower Scream Zone (Formerly Drop Zone Stunt Tower)
- 1995: Nickelodeon Splat City; The Edge and Ameri- Go Round are removed.
- 1994: Action Theater featuring Days of Thunder
- 1993: Park is renamed Paramount's Great America; Flight Deck (Formerly Top Gun); Lobster is removed
- 1992: KECO is acquired by Paramount, and renamed Paramount Parks; IMAX Pictorium Theater received a $1.5 million upgrade allowing it to screen 3-D films.
- 1991: Vortex (March 9); Saskatchewan Scrambler is removed.
- 1990: Whitewater Falls (March 31)
1980–1989
- 1989: Skyhawk (March 11); KECO purchases buildings, rides, and equipment from the City of Santa Clara (June 2); Dolphin and Seal show and Cajun Carpet are removed.
- 1988: Rip Roaring Rapids (March 12). Whizzer and Bottom's Up are removed
- 1987: Woodstock Express (Formerly Blue Streak/ Green Slime Mine Car Coaster/ Runaway Reptar); Smurf Woods (March 21); Fort Fun (March 21); HMB Endeavor (Formerly known as The Revolution, March 21)
- 1986: The Grizzly (March 15); Redwood Amphitheater with the Miami Sound Machine (June 14)
- 1985: Park is renamed Great America.
- 1985: Park is sold by Marriott corporation to the City of Santa Clara (June 5); management transfers to Kings Entertainment Company (KECO)
- 1984: Hilltopper is removed.
- 1983: The Edge (June 18); Red Baron and Ladybugs are removed.
- 1982: Atari Video Adventure
- 1980: The Demon (remodeled from Turn of the Century, March 15); Gulf coaster is removed
1970–1979
- 1979: Star Tower (formerly Sky Tower, March 31)
- 1978: IMAX Pictorium Theater, with film Man Belongs to the Earth (June 3)
- 1977: Tidal Wave (July 8)
- 1976: Marriott's Great America opens (March 20)
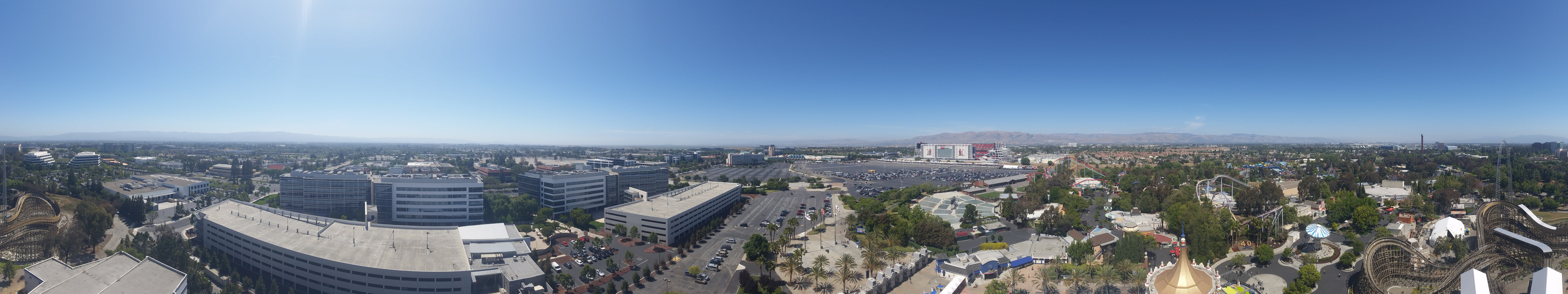
A panorama from the peak of Star Tower at California's Great America in 2015

== In film and television ==
=== Beverly Hills Cop III ===
Though appearing under the name "Wonder World", Paramount's Great America was used for exterior scenes of the theme park in the 1994 film Beverly Hills Cop III (itself released by Paramount Pictures) after Knott's Berry Farm declined filming rights.

Writer Steven E. de Souza originally wrote the story as more "Die Hard in a theme park". He was told that each of the rides he had designed would cost about $10 million to build and the whole film would cost about $70 million. When box office results for The Distinguished Gentleman came in, Paramount ordered the budget to be cut to $55 million.

Some modifications were made to the Columbia Carousel and Vortex roller coaster. Most of the Sky Whirl/Triple Wheel stunts (renamed "The Spider" for the film) were filmed in a studio. To film the exterior scenes, the motors of the Triple Wheel were left unpowered; instead, to ensure the ride did not move too quickly, some cages were loaded with sandbags to unbalance the mechanism. In this scene, George Lucas has a small part as the man Axel cuts in front of to get on the ride, also known as 'disappointed man' (this can be seen in the credits). John Singleton and Martha Coolidge also made cameo appearances in the film.

Many rides that were seen in the movie including Triple Play/Sky Whirl have since been removed. Also, the carousel at the back of the park (the Ameri-Go-Round, not the Columbia Carousel) was altered. The Ameri-Go-Round carousel has since been removed and Drop Zone is now in its place. The tunnels that supposedly ran under the park are a myth as well. No tunnels run under the park, as many thought after this was released.

The Alien Attack ride featured in the Wonder World theme park was in fact the Earthquake in Stage 50 on the Studio Tour from the Universal Studios Hollywood theme park in Universal City, California. The "aliens" featured in the ride are suited actors (and not animatronic as suggested in the film) that closely resembled the Cylons from the original Battlestar Galactica.

=== Other appearances ===
- Paramount's Great America was also used as the theme park Macaulay Culkin visits in the 1994 film Getting Even with Dad (which was released not by Paramount Pictures, but rather by Metro-Goldwyn-Mayer).
- The park's inverted steel coaster "Top Gun" (later renamed "Flight Deck") was featured in a 2007 Excedrin commercial with music from The Stremes.
- Marriott's Great America was used in the 1983 George Lucas and John Korty animated feature Twice Upon A Time. It was used both as a background for animated scenes and for a short live-action shot at the end of the film.

== Incidents ==
- On August 12, 1976, a roller coaster train on Turn of the Century (later renamed Demon) stopped automatically on the track using its braking system after a wheel assembly guide broke loose and fell to the ground. The event occurred seconds after exiting the ride's double corkscrew element, and the coaster, which was in its inaugural year, had experienced the problem twice in 9 days. None of its 24 passengers on board at the time were injured.
- In 1980, a 13-year-old boy was killed and several others injured on the Willard's Whizzer roller coaster.
- In 1989, two boys intentionally jumped out of the Loggers' Run ride. One was killed and the other fell onto a platform and was injured.
- In 1991, two couples riding the Yankee Clipper sustained injuries after their boat hydroplaned and capsized, temporarily trapping them under the overturned boat. A bump was later added to the bottom of Yankee Clipper's splashdown to prevent hydroplaning.
- In 1996, six people were injured when a raft on the Rip Roaring Rapids overturned.
- In 1998, after riding Flight Deck, a 24-year-old Spanish-speaking man, who could not read the English-language warning signs, entered a locked, gated area underneath the ride to retrieve his hat. He was hit by the foot of a passenger on the Flight Deck train and later died. The passenger suffered a broken leg.
- On August 22, 1999, a 12-year-old boy fell to his death on Drop Tower after slipping from the ride's restraints, which were still locked at the end of the ride.
- In 2005, a female park patron suffered broken ribs in an impact with the side of a seat after a raft on the Rip Roaring Rapids came to a sudden stop.
- In 2005, a woman fractured her wrist while riding Rue Le Dodge with her son. Her lawsuit against the park was eventually lost in an appeal to the California Supreme Court, which ruled 6–1 in favor of California's Great America, stating that guests assume "an assumption of risk" when riding, similar to a sport activity.
- On July 12, 2007, a 4-year-old boy drowned in the Boomerang Bay's "Great Barrier Reef" (now known as South Bay Shores' "Breakers Bay") wave pool.
- On August 10, 2009, 24 passengers on Invertigo were stuck on the ride 80 feet (24 m) up its lift hill after it malfunctioned. It took firefighters more than four hours to safely evacuate passengers down the staircase. No injuries were reported.
- On June 12, 2015, a maintenance worker was critically injured after being struck in the head by a moving train on Flight Deck. A passenger sustained serious hand and leg injuries in the incident.
- On October 28, 2017, police reported that there were multiple witnesses where 20 teenage boys were assaulting and robbing park visitors. One person was arrested while others suffered minor injuries and some were taken to the hospital.
- On July 4, 2019, the Santa Clara PD were called near the entrance of the park where a woman was shot during the evening of the fireworks show. The victim was struck on the arm by a handgun. She did not suffer any serious injuries and was also treated at the scene. It was ruled as an altercation between two family groups.
- On October 26, 2019, a group of teenagers sparked some firecrackers in the front gate causing guests to scramble, thinking it was a shooting. It was later determined to be due to a robbery. Concession stands within the park were also robbed by fleeing guests.

== Sources ==
- Michelson, Herb. (June 7, 1984). "City will purchase Marriott's". The Sacramento Bee, p. A.
- "Santa Clara drops Great America pact". (February 7, 1985). San Francisco Chronicle, p. 4.
- Ewell, Miranda. (June 6, 1985). "Santa Clara assumes ownership of Great America". San Jose Mercury News (CA), p. 8B.
- Kava, Brad. (March 15, 1989). "Great America reopens". San Jose Mercury News, p. 1.
- Eng, Sherri. (August 1, 1992). "Paramount to buy Great America owner". San Jose Mercury News, p. 1E.
