= Demon (roller coaster) =

Roller coaster at Great America parks

- Previously known as Turn of the Century (1976–1979)

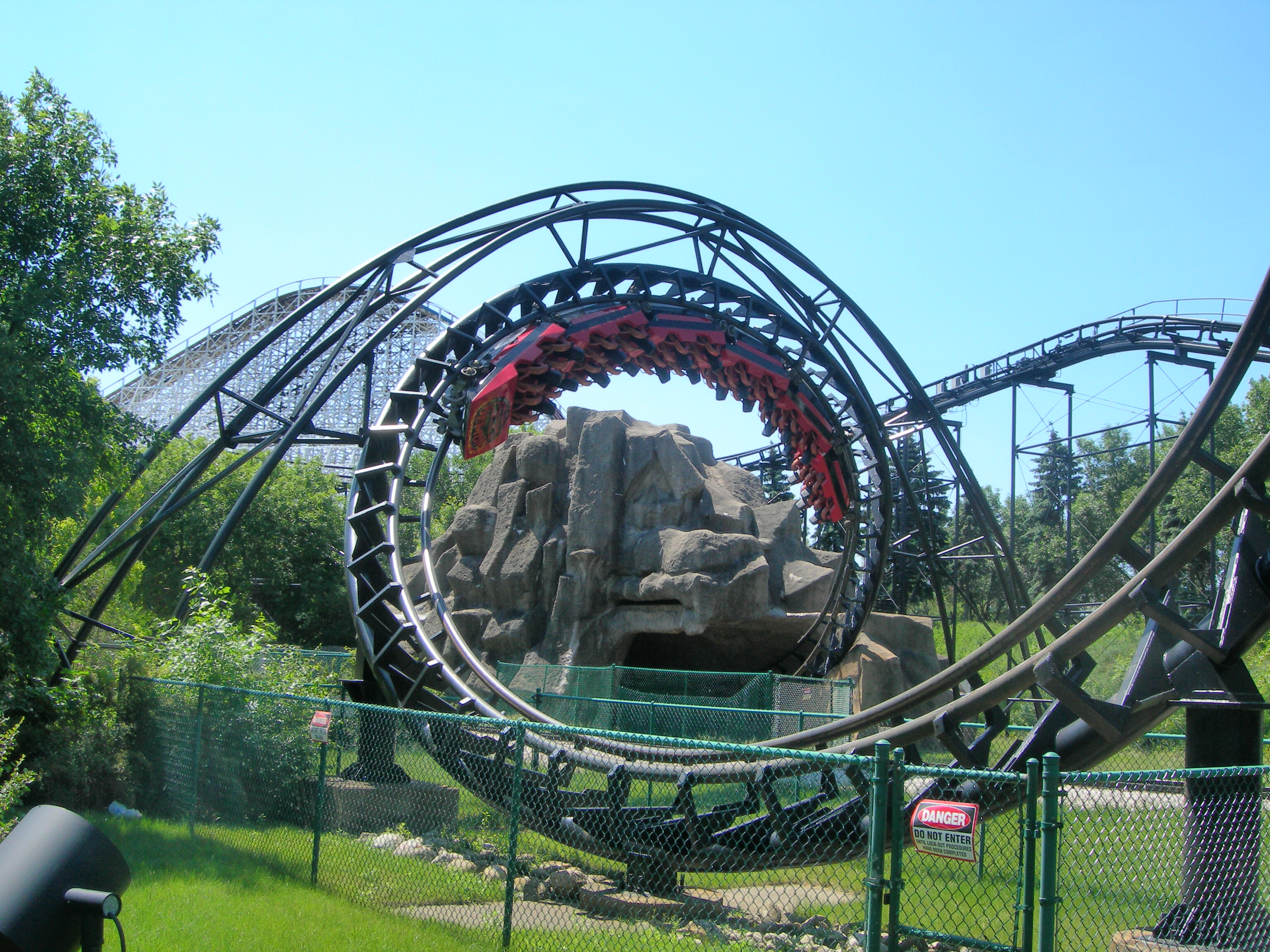
- Demon at Six Flags Great America

California's Great America
- Park section: NorCal County Fair
- Coordinates: 37°23′40″N 121°58′27″W
- Status: Operating
- Opening date: May 20, 1976
- Demon at California's Great America at RCDB

Six Flags Great America
- Park section: County Fair
- Coordinates: 42°22′00″N 87°56′06″W
- Status: Operating
- Opening date: May 29, 1976
- Demon at Six Flags Great America at RCDB

General statistics
- Type: Steel
- Manufacturer: Arrow Dynamics
- Model: Custom Looping Coaster
- Lift/launch system: Chain lift hill
- Height: 102 ft (31 m)
- Drop: 90 ft (27 m)
- Length: 2,130 ft (650 m)
- Speed: 50 mph (80 km/h)
- Inversions: 4
- Duration: 1:45
- Max vertical angle: 54°
- Capacity: 1300 riders per hour
- G-force: 6
- Height restriction: 48 in (122 cm)
- Trains: 3 trains with 6 cars; riders arranged 2 across in 2 rows for a total of 24 riders per train
- Fast Lane available at both parks
- Must transfer from wheelchair

Demon is a looping roller coaster located at Six Flags Great America in Gurnee, Illinois and California's Great America in Santa Clara, California. The pair of steel roller coasters opened in 1976 as Turn of the Century when both parks were owned by the Marriott Corporation. They were custom-designed and manufactured by Arrow Dynamics, each featuring a 102-foot-tall (31 m), 2,130-foot-long (650 m) course including two airtime hills and one of the first double corkscrew elements on a roller coaster. The rides received positive reviews from critics upon opening.

After the 1979 season, both Turn of the Century coasters were modified. The two airtime hills were replaced with two vertical loops, bringing each ride's inversion count to four – tied for the most in the world at the time. The ride was renamed to Demon and rethemed to include thematically relevant colors, rockwork, and lights, as well as a new soundtrack. On November 6, 2026, Six Flags announced that California’s Great America would be permanently closing on September 6, 2027.

== History ==
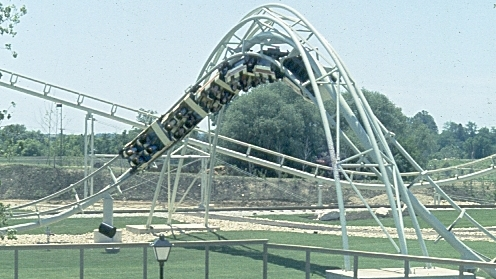
Turn of the Century in Gurnee before its conversion into Demon

In 1976, the Marriott Corporation opened two nearly identical theme parks in Illinois and California, both named Marriott's Great America. Each park featured an area called The Great Midwest Livestock Exposition at County Fair, themed to an early 20th-century rural county fair. This area was set in the Midwest at the turn of the 20th century. In line with this theme, both parks included a roller coaster called Turn of the Century in the County Fair themed area. The Turn of the Century coasters were custom-built by Arrow Dynamics, featuring a height of 102 feet (31 m) and a length of 2,130 feet (650 m).

Ron Toomer, the designer of Turn of the Century, mentioned that it cost the park $1.2 million dollars ($6.79 million in 2025) for the design and fabrication of the coaster. He estimated that construction cost the park around another million dollars ($5.66 million in 2025). The Turn of the Century coasters were the largest and most thrilling of the three original roller coasters at the Great America parks. Both coasters were identical and were among the first roller coasters to feature a double corkscrew. They also featured two airtime hills after the first drop. These hills were known for ejecting loose articles from the trains, such as hats, sunglasses, and cameras.

Both coasters were originally painted white. Around 1979, the double corkscrews of the coasters in both parks were painted red.

After the 1979 season, both Turn of the Century coasters were heavily modified. The airtime hills after the first drop were removed and replaced with two consecutive vertical loops and a lighted tunnel. Fake rock formations were built around the second loop and around the first half of the lift hill, with a third formation just before the corkscrews. Both rides were painted black and were renamed Demon. With the addition of the loops, the Demon coasters became the second in the world to feature four inversions, after Carolina Cyclone at Carowinds which opened two months earlier.

In addition to the re-design, the theme was changed as well. The storyline of the ride's transformation heard in the Demon soundtrack is that the park accidentally missed three payments on the roller coaster, and that a demon has repossessed the ride. Fog machines were placed in the tunnels, blood red colored water fell out of the rock formation by the corkscrews, and a unique logo was unveiled. This logo featured red eyes staring out of a boarded up pipe. A large version of this logo was placed on the Demon's sign with a pool of red dyed water in front of it. The original trains were also modified, with a three-dimensional version of the logo was attached to the front car of each train and flames painted on the sides of the cars. 1,700 red lights were placed into the ride's second tunnel, creating a swirl effect. These changes allowed the parks to market Demon as a new attraction for the 1980 season without having to construct a new roller coaster.

Due to opposition from religious groups, much of Demon's theming elements both parks were eventually removed, including the pipe on the ride's sign, the 3D logos and flames on the trains, the smoke and lighting effects, and the ride's soundtrack.

=== Six Flags Great America ===
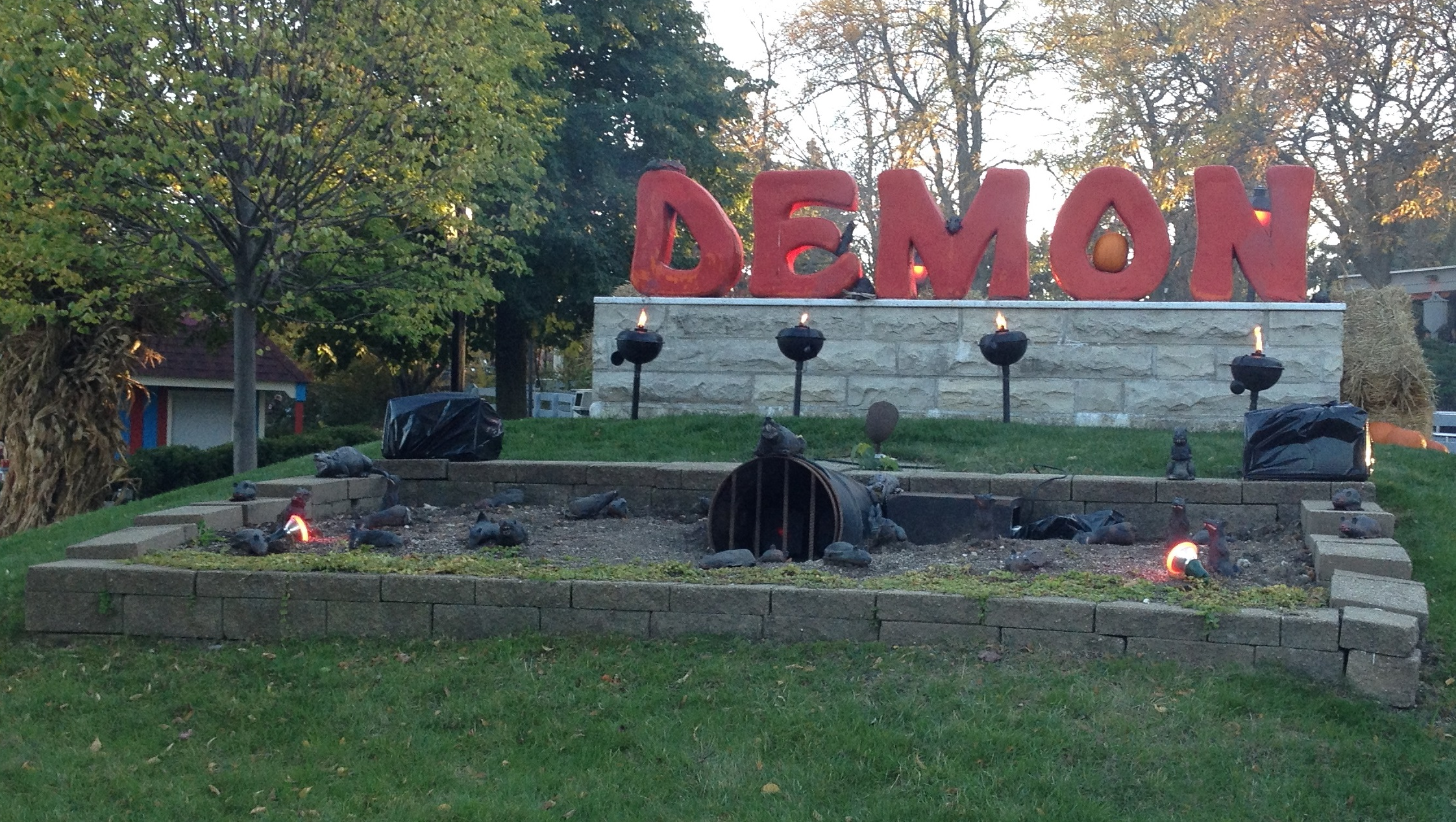
Demon's entrance in 2013 at Six Flags Great America during Fright Fest

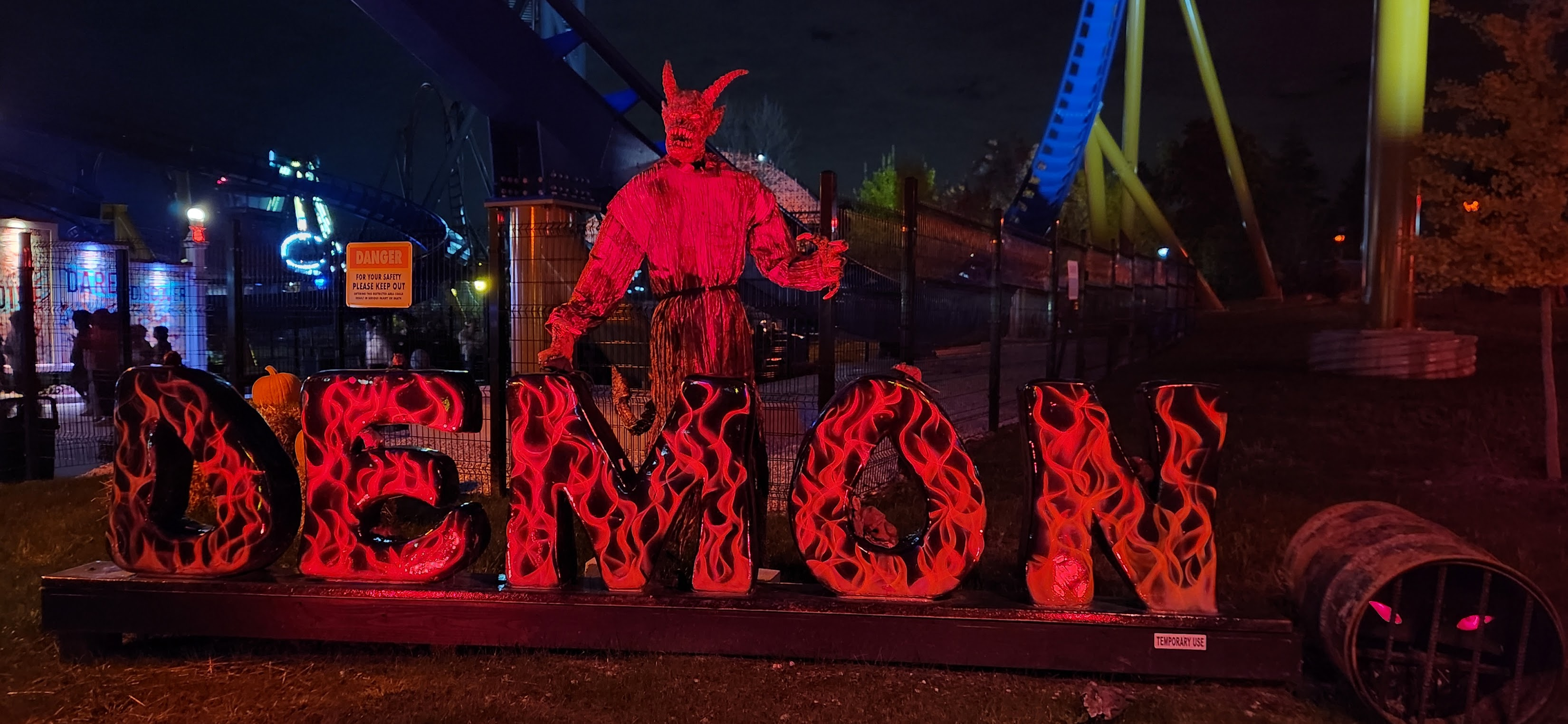
Demon's entrance in 2025 at Six Flags Great America during Fright Fest

In 2005, for Six Flags Great America's Fright Fest event, almost all of Demon's original theming returned. Decals similar to the original logos were added to the noses of the trains, fog returned in the tunnels, the Demon song played in the queue again, and red lights and tiki torches were placed all around the ride. A re-creation of the original sign was present at Fright Fest. Built from an oil barrel with red lights and fog, it was placed in the flower bed in front of the ride's sign. This display returned for subsequent Fright Fests.

On the park's 2006 opening day, the Demon song continued playing in the queue, the decals were still on the front of the trains, and the flames were still painted on the station. The rest of the theming was removed, as it was for Fright Fest only.

By 2008, the Demon logos on the front of the trains were updated. The stylized decals reading "Demon" were replaced with logos that more closely resembled the original Marriott-era logos, featuring red eyes peering out of a pipe.

In 2009, Demon's black train was given airbrushed flames on the sides of the front car with no red stripe. Around 2010, the waterfall after the stone demon head was disabled. For a 2010 advertising deal with Six Flags, the red train was wrapped in Stride Gum advertisements for the entire season.

For the 2016 season, the Demon sign's letters were repainted black with airbrushed flames. In late 2016, the attraction was given a virtual reality (VR) upgrade. The experience would be called Rage of the Gargoyles. Riders had the option to wear Samsung Gear VR headsets, powered by Oculus to create a 360-degree, 3D experience while riding. The illusion was themed to a fighter jet, where riders flew through a futuristic city as co-pilots battling demonic creatures.

In 2019, flashing yellow eyes were added to the ride's first tunnel.

For the 2021 season, several changes were made. The multicolored bowl-shaped lights around the first tunnel were replaced with red cage lights, and the two red demon eye lights in the first tunnel were fixed, as they previously did not turn on. Furthermore, flames were restored on the operator's booth, replacing the gray paint that had covered them for years.

In late 2023, the rockwork around the loops was removed. The other theming and rockwork stayed.

In July 2024, Six Flags started teasing Great America's 2025 addition. The teasers used the word "demon" multiple times, banners were put up directly next to Demon, and signpost reading "This is a mysterious sign" was placed in Demon's queue. Prior to the announcement, it was speculated that Demon could be getting removed to make way for a new attraction. However, the ride was not closed, but a new ride—Wrath of Rakshasa—would be built across from it. Wrath of Rakshasa opened in 2025 and thematically complements Demon.

=== California's Great America ===
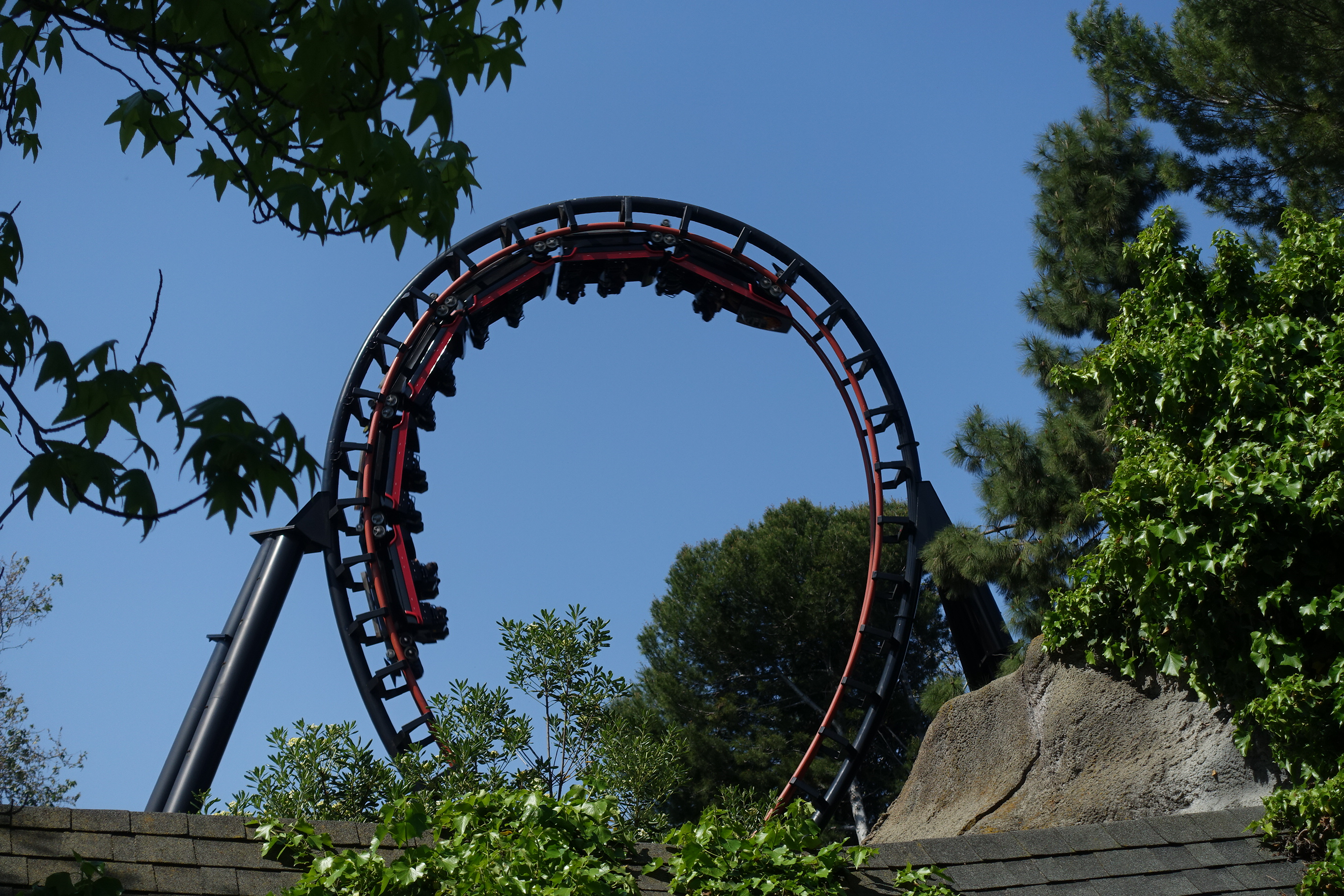
One of Demon's loops at California's Great America

Upon the ride's conversion into Demon, it was painted fully black. Since then, the rails have been repainted orange.

In 2017, for the park's Halloween event, California's Great America temporarily modified Demon into what they called "Demon Reignited". During this, a large amount of the ride's original theming returned, as well as additional effects. Decorations were added to the ride's station, flames were painted around the first tunnel, and red gobo projections were put in the second tunnel. Strobe lights were installed in the first tunnel, after the stone demon statue, and during the corkscrew elements. Additionally, various thematic elements were added to the stone demon head statue. This included the water being dyed blood red, a jet of flame being added next to the stone structure, and projection mapping being used to display blood, flames, and eyes onto the demon's face. A new pre-show and on-ride soundtrack accompanied the ride, both voiced by James Iglehart. The majority of these effects were for Halloween only. The pyrotechnics, projections, and strobe lights were removed after Halloween. The waterfall still operated, but without its coloring. The flames painted around the first tunnel stayed past Halloween, but have since been painted over.

The ride's first tunnel used to feature red, green, and blue LED strip lights. However, these began to stop working in 2012, and were removed by 2015. Later, strip lights of the same colors were added back to the first tunnel in a vertical configuration. For the 2021 season, red lights were added back into the second tunnel, fog was added around the ride, and the waterfall was reactivated. Unlike for Fright Fest 2017, these effects are permanent.

== Ride experience ==
=== Queue ===
During the queue, a 25-minute-long soundtrack is played, including dialogue, sound effects, and the ride's theme song. The backstory of the ride is that a demon slithered into Great America and attached himself to one of the ride's cars, then disappeared into the ride's structure. He has supposedly grown large from repossessing riders and is unable to escape.

=== Layout ===
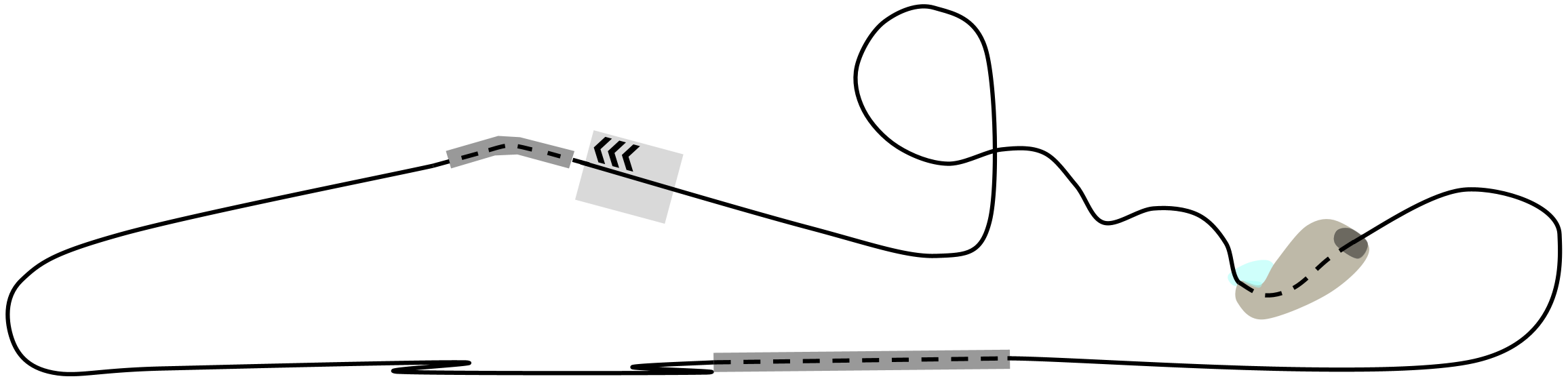
A top-down view of the ride's layout

After boarding the ride, riders start by traveling through a small tunnel with lights which turns slightly to the left. An eerie sound effect is played, then the train then ascends the lift hill. A pre-drop is followed by a nearly 180° turn just before the first drop, which leads directly into two vertical loops. According to the park, riders can experience between 2 and 6 g's during these loops. Next, riders fly through a tunnel containing red lights at 45 miles per hour (72 km/h), before climbing a small hill, where their speed significantly decreases. At the top of the hill is the midcourse brake run and another pre-drop followed by a turn, this time with a slightly greater angle than 180°. This leads into another drop, this one through the mouth of a stone structure. At the bottom of this drop, the track sharply banks to the right, and the train begins a double corkscrew. These corkscrews have a diameter of 35 feet (11 m). Afterwards, the track makes a large, approximately 270° turn to the right, traveling up and over itself, before finally making a smaller right turn back into the final brake run and the station.

== Reception ==
Upon their debut, the Turn of the Century coasters were very highly praised. Sunset Magazine awarded the Santa Clara coaster five out of five stars, a rating shared by only two other coasters at the time. The Santa Clara version accommodated over a million riders in its first six months. In 1984, Gary Kyriazi, an employee of the company who manufactured Demon, named it the roller coaster with the "best audio-visual effects" that he had ridden. In 2002, Joseph Lopez of Northwest Herald criticized the ride, calling it "lame" and comparing it unfavorably to more modern coasters.

== Incidents ==
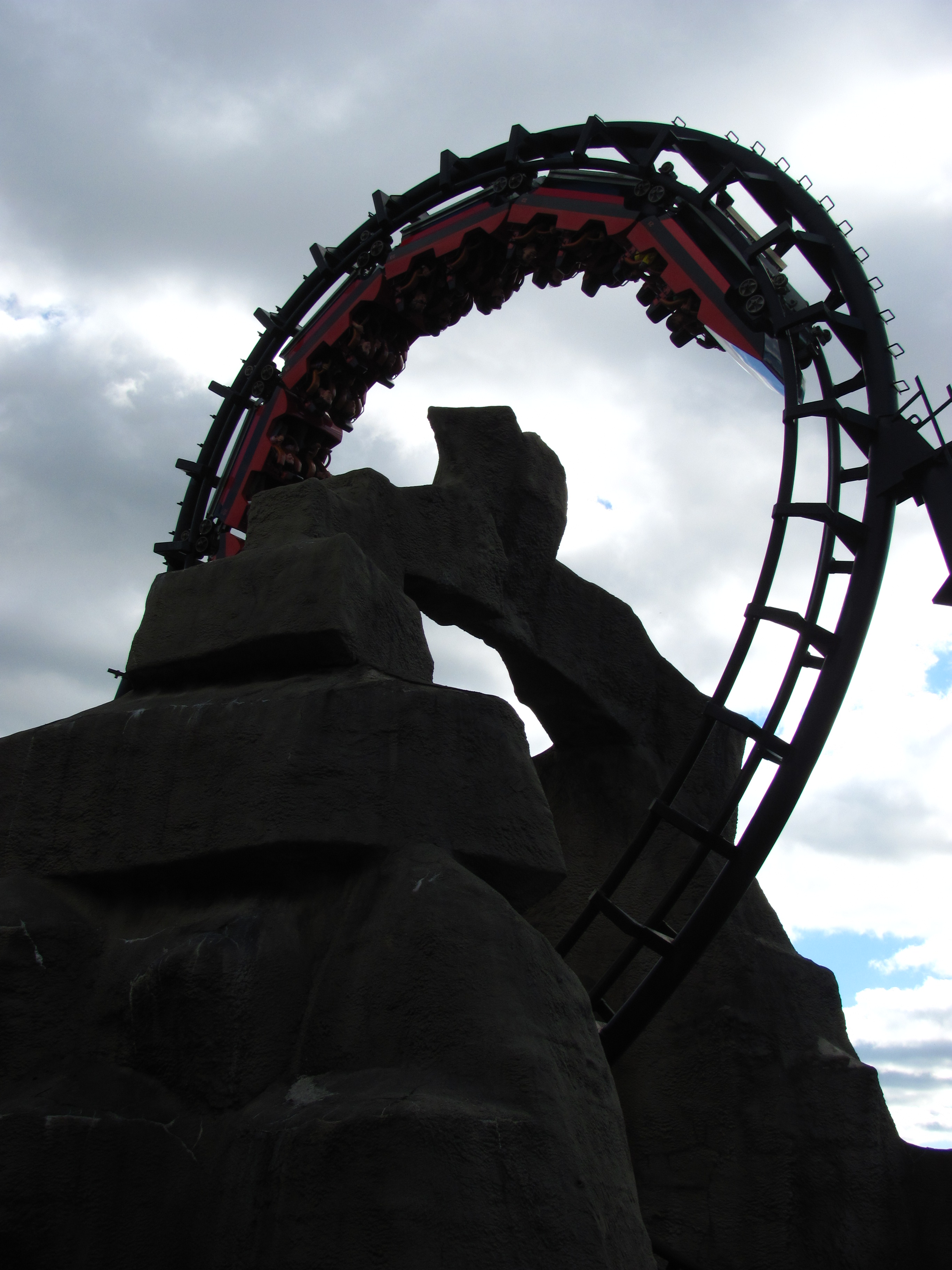
The loop in which the trains were stuck (13 years after the incident)

In August of Turn of the Century's opening year, a wheel guide assembly fell off of a train on the version in Santa Clara. This occurred directly after the ride's two corkscrews. The train was automatically stopped by a built-in safety system. This same issue occurred twice in the span of nine days, and the coaster was temporarily shut down for inspections shortly after. Out of the two incidents, no guests were seriously injured. Passengers evacuated the train using ladders, and two "shaken up" passengers were taken to a hospital.

In 1993, two trains collided at low speeds in the station of the Gurnee ride due to a switch malfunction, causing injuries to eight people. All of them were treated at local hospitals and released the same day. After the incident, the ride remained closed for a short period for repairs, following an investigation from the park staff and the fire department.

Around 11 am on Saturday, April 18, 1998, twenty-three riders were left stranded upside down on the Gurnee ride after the black train came to an unexpected halt in the middle of one of the vertical loops. Riders were stuck for over two hours before being brought to the ground by firefighters using a cherry picker. Four passengers were taken to local hospitals out of precaution but released that afternoon. Investigators determined that the incident was caused by a guide wheel that runs along the inside of the track separating from the axle of the last car. A mechanical safety system built into the wheel assembly engaged, preventing the train from derailing. The roller coaster reopened shortly after the conclusion of the investigation.

Preceded by Carolina Cyclone	Most Inversions On A Roller Coaster; May 1980–May 1982; With: Carolina Cyclone May 1980–May 1982	Succeeded by Viper
