= Wilderness Run (Carowinds) =

Steel roller coaster at Carowinds

- Previously known as Taxi Jam (1998-2004) Hey Arnold Taxi Chase (2005-2009) and Lucy's Crabbie Cabbie (2010-2017)

Carowinds
- Location: Carowinds
- Park section: Camp Snoopy
- Coordinates: 35.1011°N 80.9388°W
- Status: Operating
- Opening date: 1998

General statistics
- Type: Steel – Junior
- Manufacturer: E&F Miler Industries
- Height: 15 ft (4.6 m)
- Speed: 15 mph (24 km/h)
- Inversions: 0
- Height restriction: 36 in (91 cm)
- Trains: Single train with 6 cars. Riders are arranged 2 across in a single row for a total of 12 riders per train.
- Wilderness Run at RCDB

Wilderness Run (formerly known as Taxi Jam, Hey Arnold Taxi Chase, and Lucy's Crabbie Cabbie) is a steel roller coaster at Carowinds, near Charlotte, North Carolina.

== Design ==
Wilderness Run, next to Thunder Striker, has a green track with brown supports, including a yellow and orange train with a red stripe down the middle. The train consists of six cars with two people per car making a total of twelve riders. The coaster was made by E&F Miler Industries which also made the Taxi Jam roller coaster at Canada's Wonderland and The Great Pumpkin Coaster at Kings Island and Kings Dominion.

== Layout ==
As riders leave the station, they climb up the 15-foot (4.6 m) lift hill. When riders reach the top of the hill, they do a left downward bank turn, which takes their picture in the middle of the element. Riders climb up a small camelback hill, then a smaller hill, with a downward left helix, following a series of airtime bumps.
