= Whizzer (roller coaster) =

Steel roller coaster

- Previously known as Willard's Whizzer

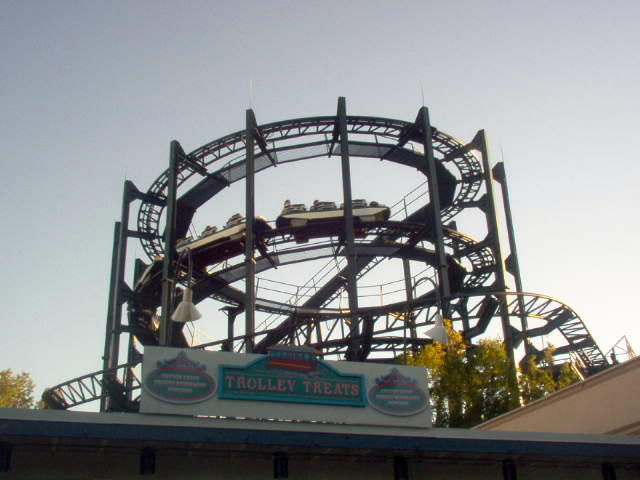
- The Whizzer as it appeared in 2005, showing its unique lift hill.

Six Flags Great America
- Park section: Hometown Square
- Coordinates: 42.368199°N 87.935659°W
- Status: Operating
- Opening date: May 29, 1976

California's Great America
- Coordinates: 37.396057°N 121.974689°W
- Status: Removed
- Opening date: March 20, 1976
- Closing date: 1988
- Whizzer at California's Great America at RCDB

General statistics
- Type: Steel
- Manufacturer: Anton Schwarzkopf
- Designer: Werner Stengel
- Model: Speedracer
- Track layout: Terrain
- Lift/launch system: Electric spiral lift
- Height: 70 ft (21 m)
- Drop: 64 ft (20 m)
- Length: 3,100 ft (940 m)
- Speed: 45 mph (72 km/h)
- Inversions: 0
- Duration: 2:00
- Restraint style: Seat belt
- Height restriction: 36 in (91 cm)
- Trains: 3 trains with 4 cars; riders arranged 1 across in 6 rows for a total of 24 riders per train
- Website: Official website
- Fast Lane available
- Whizzer at RCDB

Whizzer, originally named Willard's Whizzer, is a steel roller coaster located at Six Flags Great America in Gurnee, Illinois, United States. Designed by Werner Stengel and built by Anton Schwarzkopf, the Speedracer model was one of two identical roller coasters built for the Marriott Corporation in time for the debut of their Great America parks in 1976. Whizzer is the last remaining Speedracer roller coaster in the world.

The first installation of Whizzer opened with California's Great America on March 20, 1976, where it operated until 1988. The second opened with Six Flags Great America on May 29, 1976, and remains in operation.

== History ==
In the early 1970s, Marriott Corporation was looking to extend its hotel and restaurant operations into the amusement park industry. They began planning the construction of three parks in separate metropolitan areas throughout the United States. Their goal was to have them open in time to celebrate the nation's Bicentennial. Although one of the parks was abandoned due to local opposition, the other two opened as planned in 1976.

Both parks were named Marriott's Great America, and the first opened in Santa Clara, California, on March 20, 1976. The second opened in Gurnee, Illinois, on May 29, 1976. One of the headlining attractions at both parks on opening day was Willard's Whizzer, which was named after Marriott founder J. Willard Marriott. Whizzer was a custom-built Speedracer model designed by Werner Stengel and built by Anton Schwarzkopf, a well-known amusement manufacturing company responsible for many rides that opened in the mid-to-late 20th century.

=== Six Flags Great America ===
Six Flags Great America's Whizzer was nearly closed on August 11, 2002, fueled by increasing maintenance costs, to make way for Superman: Ultimate Flight. However, due to public backlash and outcry, the park reversed their decision at the last minute and instead demolished the highly unpopular Shockwave, putting Superman: Ultimate Flight on its plot of land in Orleans Place.

In 2026, 14 pieces of Whizzer's track were replaced over the offseason. It reopened during the park's 50th anniversary event in June 2026.

=== California's Great America ===
After Marriott sold California's Great America to the city of Santa Clara under management of the Kings Entertainment Company, the Whizzer continued to operate until it was subsequently demolished in 1988. A few cement footers still remain where the Whizzer once stood.

== Ride experience ==
=== Queue and station ===
The ride's queue is made up of several switchbacks beneath the station, then a staircase up to the loading area. Riders are seated two per seat, with the taller person sitting in the rear and the shorter person sitting in front.

=== Layout ===
After loading, riders turn left out of the station and into an electric spiral lift hill, where an electric contact rail powers a motor which moves the train up the lift hill. At the top of the 70-foot (21 m) spiral, the train slowly picks up speed as it travels down the first drop at a shallow angle. At the bottom of the first drop, the track banks sharply to the right and turns around approximately 200°. Next, the train ascends a hill and completes a large left turn where a brake run is located. Riders then drop into a 270° helix to the right which closely hugs the terrain and has strong banking. Afterwards, the train climbs another hill into the midcourse brake run. Riders then turn about 200° to the right, directly around (and within a few feet of) the spiral lift hill. Directly after this, the track banks left and dips down over a small pond, then rises once more, turning to the left to cross over the initial drop, then turning to the right to cross a pedestrian path below. The ride ends with a large 560° helix, then the final brake run into the station.

== Incidents ==
From the start, both Whizzers suffered from problems with the braking system that would sometimes allow the trains to collide in the station. In one four-year period, from 1976 to 1979, there were at least 11 recorded instances of station collisions on the version in Santa Clara, resulting in an unknown number of injuries. There were also two station collisions on the version in Gurnee, which occurred less than a month apart on July 24 and August 18, 1976. A total of 31 riders were injured in the Gurnee collisions. Then on March 29, 1980, a 13-year-old boy was killed and eight others injured after two trains collided at the station on the Santa Clara Whizzer. Following the accident, both rides underwent several changes. Seatbelts were added, the braking system was modified and the number of trains that could be run at once was reduced from five to three. Willard’s name was also dropped, leaving the ride’s name as simply "Whizzer". Marriott never reported the potential safety hazard to the Consumer Product Safety Commission, which led to a 1981 civil penalty amounting to $70,000.

== Awards ==
The Whizzer has been recognized as an ACE Coaster Landmark and received a plaque on August 10, 2012.

Golden Ticket Awards: Top steel Roller Coasters
Year									1998	1999
Ranking									–	–
Year	2000	2001	2002	2003	2004	2005	2006	2007	2008	2009
Ranking	–	–	–	–	–	–	–	–	45	47
Year	2010	2011	2012	2013	2014	2015	2016	2017	2018	2019
Ranking	–	–	–	40	44	46	45	46	50	44
Year	2020	2021	2022	2023	2024	2025	2026			
Ranking	N/A	–	50	–	–	–	–			
