= List of Six Flags Great America attractions =

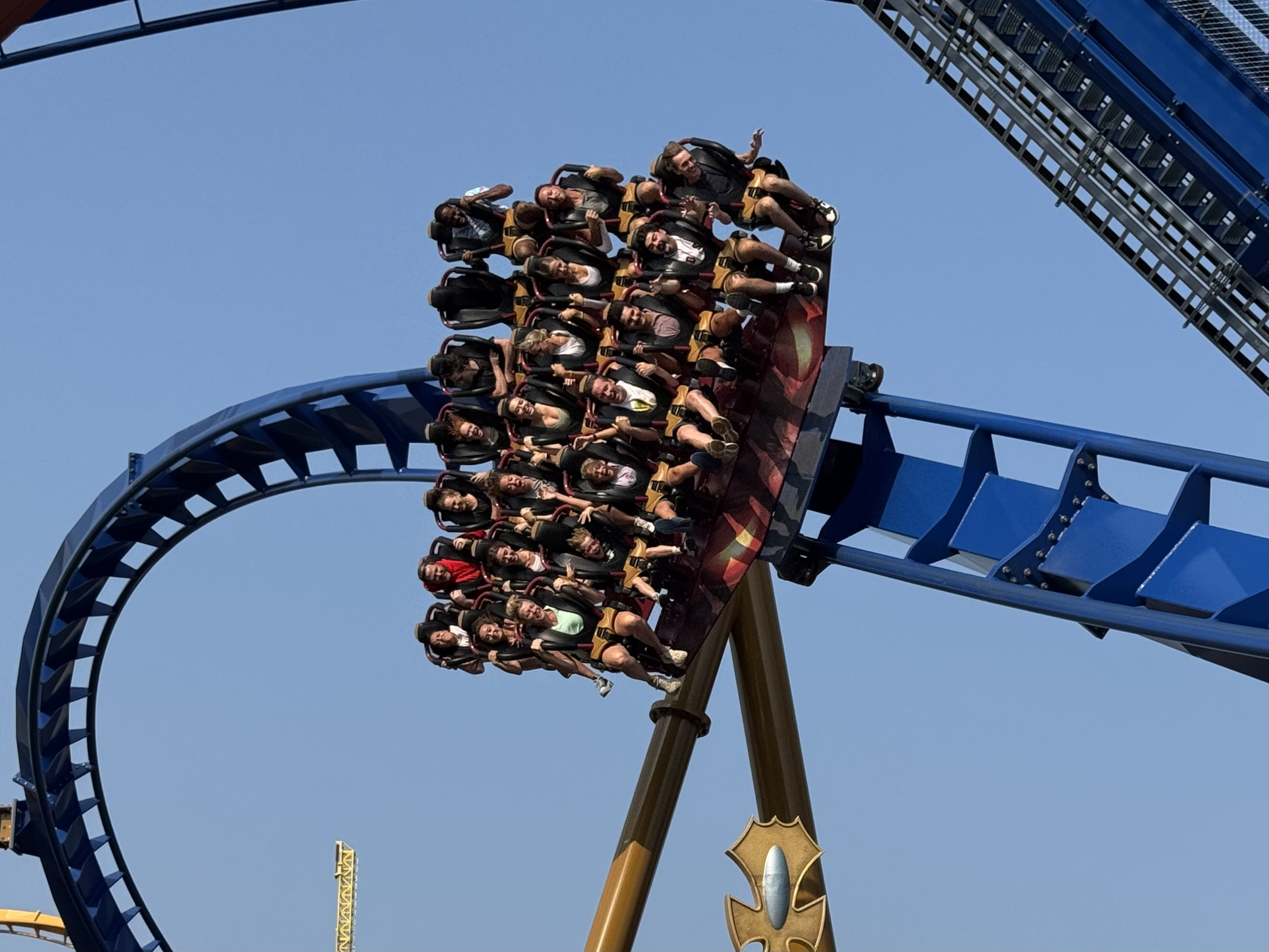
Wrath of Rakshasa is the most recent attraction at Six Flags Great America, which opened in May 2025.

Six Flags Great America is a 275-acre (111 ha) amusement park located in Gurnee, Illinois, United States, a village located between Chicago and Milwaukee. As of 2026, the park currently offers 44 total attractions, including 16 roller coasters. (Note: Although the park is marketed as having 17 roller coasters, multiple references indicate the park has 16 as of 2025.) Among the park's attractions are three roller coasters that are recognized as a Coaster Landmark by the American Coaster Enthusiasts, a program to recognize notable roller coasters in roller coaster history. This includes American Eagle, which opened as the tallest, fastest, and longest dual-tracked racing wooden roller coaster in the world; Batman: The Ride, the first inverted roller coaster in the world; and Whizzer, a Speedracer roller coaster. Other attractions include a 100-foot (30 m) tall double-decker carousel named Columbia Carousel and a bumper cars attraction named Rue Le Dodge, both respectively billed as being one of the largest of their kinds.

The most recent attraction opened is Wrath of Rakshasa, which opened on May 31, 2025. It is a Dive Coaster model manufactured by Bolliger & Mabillard (B&M). In 2027, the park will add Camp Timber Trail, a woodland-themed family area which will feature nine attractions. It will be headlined by Sky Hawk, a new Vekoma suspended family coaster.

Six Flags Great America uses a standardized ride rating system developed by its owner, Six Flags Entertainment Corporation, to classify ride intensity on a scale of one to five, with one representing the calmest rides and five representing the most aggressive rides; this system is also known as the "thrill level".

== Current attractions ==
Thrill level (out of 5)
1 (low) 2 (mild) 3 (moderate) 4 (high) 5 (aggressive)

=== Roller coasters ===
As of June 2026, Six Flags Great America features 16 roller coasters.

Name	Photo	Opened	Manufacturer	Type or model	Section	Description	Thrill level
Whizzer		1976	Anton Schwarzkopf	Speedracer	Hometown Square	A 70-foot (21 m) tall Speedracer steel family roller coaster; the last remaining Speedracer in the world. Designated as an ACE Coaster Landmark in 2012.	3
Demon		1976	Arrow Dynamics	Custom Looping Coaster	County Fair	A 103.7-foot (31.6 m) tall Arrow Dynamics looping steel roller coaster, featuring four inversions. It originally operated as Turn of the Century from 1976 to 1979.	5
American Eagle		1981	Intamin	Dual-tracked wooden coaster	County Fair	A 127-foot (39 m) tall dual-tracked racing wooden roller coaster. It holds records as the tallest, fastest, and longest racing wooden roller coaster in the world. Designated as an ACE Coaster Landmark in 2025.	4
Batman: The Ride		1992	Bolliger & Mabillard	Inverted roller coaster	DC Universe	A 100-foot (30 m) tall inverted roller coaster with five inversions. It is the first inverted roller coaster in the world. Designated as an ACE Coaster Landmark in 2005.	5
Viper		1995	Six Flags	Wooden roller coaster	Southwest Territory	A 100-foot (30 m) tall wooden roller coaster, built in-house by Six Flags. The ride's layout is a mirror image of Coney Island Cyclone.	4
Sprocket Rockets		1998	Vekoma	Junior Coaster	Camp Cartoon	A steel roller coaster for kids. It originally operated as Spacely's Sprocket Rockets from 1998 to 2018.	2
Raging Bull		1999	Bolliger & Mabillard	Hypercoaster	Southwest Territory	A 202-foot (62 m) tall steel hyper and twister roller coaster. It is the tallest roller coaster in the park.	5
The Flash: Vertical Velocity		2001	Intamin	Impulse roller coaster	DC Universe	A 185-foot (56 m) tall steel inverted and launched roller coaster, which launches riders from 0 to 70 miles per hour (110 km/h) in 4 seconds. Originally operated as Vertical Velocity from 2001 to 2021.	5
Superman: Ultimate Flight		2003	Bolliger & Mabillard	Flying roller coaster	Orleans Place	A 106-foot (32 m) tall flying roller coaster where riders lay facing the ground, featuring two inversions and multiple twists and turns.	5
The Dark Knight Coaster		2008	Mack Rides	Wild mouse coaster	Orleans Place	An indoor wild mouse roller coaster themed to the 2008 film The Dark Knight.	4
Little Dipper		2010	Philadelphia Toboggan Coasters	Wooden roller coaster	Yukon Territory	A historic kids roller coaster that originally operated at Kiddieland Amusement Park from 1950 to 2009. Designated as an ACE Coaster Classic.	2
X-Flight		2012	Bolliger & Mabillard	Wing Coaster	County Fair	A 120-foot (37 m) tall wing coaster, where riders sit on either side of the ride's track, featuring five inversions.	5
Goliath		2014	Rocky Mountain Construction	Wooden Topper Track	County Fair	A 165-foot (50 m) tall wooden roller coaster. With a 180-foot (55 m) tall drop, the ride has two inversions and is the longest and fastest wooden roller coaster in the world.	5
The Joker		2017	S&S – Sansei Technologies	4D Free Spin	DC Universe	A fourth-dimension free-spin steel roller coaster where the seats flip upside-down as the train goes over multiple hills.	5
Maxx Force		2019	S&S – Sansei Technologies	Compressed Air Launch	Carousel Plaza	An air-launched steel roller coaster, featuring five inversions. It is the fastest accelerating roller coaster, going 0 to 78 miles per hour (126 km/h) in 1.8 seconds.	5
Wrath of Rakshasa		2025	Bolliger & Mabillard	Dive Coaster	County Fair	A 180-foot (55 m) tall dive coaster. With a maximum vertical angle of 96° and five inversions, it is the steepest dive coaster and features the most inversions on a dive coaster.	5

=== Thrill rides ===
As of June 2026, the park has two thrill rides.

Name	Photo	Opened	Manufacturer	Type or model	Section	Description	Thrill level
Giant Drop		1997	Intamin	Giant Drop	Southwest Territory	A 227-foot (69 m) tall drop tower ride. It is the second tallest attraction in the park, behind Sky Trek Tower.	4
Sky Striker		2024	Zamperla	Discovery	County Fair	A 172-foot (52 m) tall pendulum ride, reaching speeds of 75 miles per hour (121 km/h).	5

=== Family rides ===
As of June 2026, the park features 15 family rides, including transportation rides.

Name	Photo	Opened	Manufacturer	Type or model	Section	Description	Thrill level
Columbia Carousel		1976	Chance Rides	Double-decker carousel	Carousel Plaza	A 100-foot (30 m) tall double-decker carousel. It is the second-tallest carousel in the world.	1
Rue Le Dodge		1976	Soli	Bumper cars	Orleans Place	A bumper cars attraction. The ride has the largest bumper car floor in the world.	4
DC Super-Villains Swing		1976	Zierer	Wave Swinger	DC Universe	A swing ride. The ride was formerly named Whirligig from 1976 to 2022.	2
Fiddler's Fling		1976	Anton Schwarzkopf	Calypso	County Fair	A Calypso ride model, featuring intense spins.	3
Great America Scenic Railway		1976	Custom Fabricators, Inc.	Train	Hometown Square, County Fair	A 3 ft (914 mm) narrow-gauge railway scenic transportation ride which loops around the park, with two stations.	1
Hometown Fun Machine		1976	Eli Bridge	Scrambler	Hometown Square	A spinning scrambler ride. It was formerly named Saskatchewan Scrambler from 1976 to 1977.	3
The Lobster		1976	Anton Schwarzkopf	Polyp	Hometown Square	A Polyp octopus ride, where cars spin freely and go up, attached to an arm. It was named East River Crawler from 1992 to 2017.	2
Triple Play		1976	HUSS	Troika	Hometown Square	A Troika spinning ride, where the ride has three arms.	3
Sky Trek Tower		1977	Intamin	Gyro Tower 1200	Carousel Plaza	A 330-foot (100 m) tall observation tower, providing views of both the park and surrounding areas, including the Chicago skyline. Sky Trek Tower is the tallest free-standing structure in Lake County, Illinois.	2
Ricochet		1977	HUSS	Swingaround	Southwest Territory	A swinging ride painted with cow spots. It was formerly named Big Top from 1977 to 1995.	3
Condor		1991	HUSS	Condor	Orleans Place	A spinning aerial Condor model ride, rotating riders and alternating rotation speeds.	3
Chubasco		1996	Zamperla	Teacups	Southwest Territory	An indoor teacups attraction, located within the Southwest Territory mission building.	3
River Rocker		1996	Zamperla	Galleon	Southwest Territory	A swinging pirate ship ride.	2
Big Easy Balloons		2004	Zamperla	Balloon Race	Mardi Gras	A spinning balloon ride.	2
Justice League: Battle for Metropolis		2016	Sally Corporation	Dark ride	Metropolis Plaza	An interactive 2D dark ride, based on the Justice League.	2

=== Children's rides ===
Across the park's two children's sections—Kidzopolis and Hometown Park—the park features 8 children's rides as of June 2026. All Hometown Park attractions were originally added in 1976, removed in 2000, then added again in 2015.

Name	Opened	Manufacturer	Type or model	Section	Description	Thrill level
Bouncer	2007	Zamperla	Jumping Star	Kidzopolis	Riders go up and down in the air.	2
Krazy Kars	2007	Zamperla	U-Drive	Kidzopolis	A controlled car ride themed to a road trip.	2
Krazy Kups	2007	Zamperla	Teacups	Kidzopolis	A small kids teacup ride.	2
Up, Up & Away	2007	Zamperla	Samba Tower	Kidzopolis	Riders go up in fruit-themed cars.	2
ZoomJets	2007	Zamperla	Aero Top Jet	Kidzopolis	A controlled flying plane ride.	2
Lady Bugs	2015	S.B. Ramagosa	Carousel	Hometown Park	A lady bug car that goes around.	1
Red Baron	2015	Chance Rides	Plane ride	Hometown Park	A controlled flying plane ride.	1
Tot's Livery	2015	Hampton	Carousel	Hometown Park	A carriage ride that goes around.	1

=== Water rides ===
As of June 2026, the park has three water rides.

Name	Photo	Opened	Manufacturer	Type or model	Section	Description	Thrill level
Logger's Run		1976	Arrow Dynamics	Log flume	Yukon Territory	A log flume water ride. The ride's track interlink with Aquaman Splashdown.	2
Aquaman Splashdown		1976	Arrow Dynamics	Hydroflume	DC Universe	A hydroflume model water ride. The ride's track interlink with Logger's Run. It was formerly named Yankee Clipper from 1976 to 2022.	2
Roaring Rapids		1984	Intamin	River rapids ride	Mardi Gras	A river rapids ride.	4

== Future attractions ==
All future attractions are part of the Camp Timber Trail, a new woodlands-themed area opening in 2027.

Name	Photo	Opened	Manufacturer	Section	Description
Bee Boppin'		2027	Barbieri	Camp Timber Trail	Formerly operated as Buzzy Beez from 1976 to 1997 and as Porky's Buzzy Beez from 1998 until its removal in 2010. It also briefly operated in 2012 (with the latter name) in place of East River Crawler, which was undergoing a refurbishment during that season.
Creek Cruiser		2027	Thiel	Camp Timber Trail	Formerly operated as Yogi's Yahoo River from 1998 to 2017 and Yahoo River from 2018 to 2025.
Forest Grove Play Park		2027		Camp Timber Trail	An outdoor playground.
Sky Hawk		2027	Vekoma	Camp Timber Trail	A Vekoma Suspended Family Coaster. It is a clone of Phoenix at Deno's Wonder Wheel Amusement Park in Brooklyn, New York. Six Flags stated that it would take the record as the Midwest's tallest, fastest, and longest suspended coaster.
Trail Trotters		2027		Camp Timber Trail	
Wilderness Wagon		2027	Zamperla	Camp Timber Trail	Formerly Scooby Doo's Mystery Machine from 1998 to 2017 and Crazy Bus from 2018 to 2025.

== See also ==
- List of former Six Flags Great America attractions
- List of Six Flags Hurricane Harbor Chicago attractions
