= List of former Six Flags Great America attractions =

This is a list of rides, attractions, and themed areas from Six Flags Great America in Gurnee, Illinois, that no longer operate in the park.

== Rides and attractions ==
=== Former roller coasters ===
Coaster	Year opened	Year closed	Manufacturer (Model)	Location in Park	Description
Gulf Coaster	1976	1976	Allan Herschell Company	Orleans Place	Small kiddie coaster that was located about where Roaring Rapids' entrance is today.
Z-Force	1985	1987	Intamin; Space Diver	County Fair	Steel roller coaster that featured a stacked design and numerous steep rolling track dives. Later located at Six Flags Over Georgia as Z-Force and at Six Flags Magic Mountain as Flashback.
Tidal Wave	1978	1991	Anton Schwarzkopf; Shuttle Loop	Yankee Harbor (now DC Universe)	Riders accelerated from 0 to 57 mph (92 km/h) in 6 seconds. Was removed to make room for Batman: The Ride. Later located at Six Flags Over Georgia as Viper, and at Kentucky Kingdom as Greezed Lightnin'. Was scrapped in 2013 to make way for Lightning Run.
Rolling Thunder	1989	1995	Intamin; Swiss Bob	Hometown Square	Secured in bobsled-like vehicles, riders careen around tight turns. Originally located at Six Flags Great Adventure as Sarajevo Bobsleds. It was removed from Great America to make room for Southwest Territory. Was relocated to Six Flags Great Escape in 1997 and reopened the following year as Alpine Bobsled. It operated at Great Escape until it was removed in 2023 to make way for The Bobcat.
Shockwave	1988	2002	Arrow Dynamics; Looping Coaster	Orleans Place	Riders turned upside-down seven times in three different ways and reached speeds of 65 mph (105 km/h). It was removed due to maintenance issues, declining popularity, and to make room for Superman: Ultimate Flight.
Déjà Vu	2001	2007	Vekoma; Giant Inverted Boomerang	County Fair	Floorless trains suspended beneath an overhead track traversed the track forward and in reverse. Removed due to maintenance issues. Now located at Silverwood as Aftershock. It was replaced by Buccaneer Battle in 2009.
Iron Wolf	1990	2011	Bolliger & Mabillard; Stand-Up Coaster	County Fair	Riders maneuver twisting turns and sudden drops while in a standing position. Now located at Six Flags America as Firebird, where it has been converted into a floorless coaster. Iron Wolf was replaced by Goliath in June 2014.
Ragin' Cajun	2004	2013	Zamperla; Spinning Wild Mouse	Mardi Gras	Riders careen around tight turns and sharp dips while strapped within a spinning vehicle. Closed at the end of the 2013 season to be relocated to Six Flags America. Now operates at Six Flags Great Adventure. Replaced by The Joker in 2017.

=== Former flat rides ===
Name	Year opened	Year closed	Manufacturer (Model)	Location in Park	Description
Ameri-Go-Round	1976	2003	Dentzel Carousel Company	County Fair	Originally built in the 1910s at Fontaine Ferry Park, replaced by Revolution and is currently in storage containers by the Dark Knight Coaster and Superman: Ultimate Flight.
Cajun Cliffhanger	1976	2000	Chance Rides; Rotor	Orleans Place	Was removed due to lawsuits from two injured riders. The Joker is located on its former site.
Power Dive	1987	2001	Intamin; Looping Starship	Orleans Place	Removed because of maintenance issues. Its body could be seen in the boneyard for many years. Replaced with King Chaos.
Sky Whirl	1976	2000	Intamin; Triple Tree Wheel	County Fair	Removed due to age, maintenance, and to make room for Déjà Vu. About 3 of the cabins are now Fright Fest props for the Six Saints Cemetery.
Space Shuttle America	1994	2007	I-Werks; Motion Simulator Ride	Carousel Plaza	Closed due to unpopularity and rising operating costs. The ride and building were removed in December 2009 after being closed for two seasons. The area has expanded to accommodate Hurricane Harbor's Riptide Bay
Bottoms Up	1976	1983	Chance Rides; Trabant	Hometown Square	Removed when the Orbit was relocated from Orleans Place.
Eagles Flight / Delta Flyer	1976	1984	Von Roll; Sky Ride	County Fair, Orleans Place	Sky ride that took riders from County Fair to Orleans Place. The County Fair station still remains, but it has since been converted into Funnel Cake Foundry (a restaurant).
Ferris wheel	1980	1984	Eli Bridge Company; Ferris wheel	County Fair	It was sandwiched between the Fairgrounds Junction train station and the Eagle's Flight skyride station; it was removed when the Fairgrounds Junction train station was moved over to accommodate Z-Force.
Kiddie Antiques	1976	1998	Hampton	County Fair	Was originally located across from Johnny Rockets along with the identical Kiddie Combo before being relocated in 1987 to the Bugs Bunny Land children's section in Yukon Territory. It was removed when the area was transformed into Bugs Bunny National Park.
Kiddie Combo	1976	1998	Hampton	County Fair	Was originally located across from Johnny Rockets along with the identical Kiddie Antiques before being relocated in 1987 to the Bugs Bunny Land children's section in Yukon Territory. It was removed when the area was transformed into Bugs Bunny National Park.
Great America Raceway	1976	2010	Arrow Dynamics; Antique Cars	County Fair	Was originally named Barney Oldfield Speedway. Reconfigured from a figure-eight track to an oval track to make room for Splashwater Falls. Removed to make room for X-Flight. Most cars are still kept in storage at the park. Some cars are now used by the entertainment department for shows and parades and also as Fright Fest props for the Six Saints Cemetery.
Hay Baler	1977	2000	Mack; Matterhorn	County Fair	Removed to make room for Déjà Vu.
Hilltopper	1977	1984	Wisdom Rides; Himalaya	County Fair	Hilltopper was located next to Turn Of The Century's lift. Later moved closer to the midway not long after and renamed Industrial Revolution.Spot would be reoccupied by the Sky Trail ropes course in 2010 until 2014. This space now houses of Wrath of Rakshasa's immelmann inversion.
Southern Cross	1977	1983	Von Roll; Sky Ride	Orleans Place	Took riders from Orleans Place to what is now Southwest Territory. At least one car is now a Fright Fest prop.
Spinnaker	1976	1977	Hrubetz; Round Up	Yankee Harbor (now DC Universe)	Removed when Tidal Wave was built.
Splashwater Falls	1986	2007	Hopkins; Shoot The Chutes	County Fair	Removed due to decline in popularity and old age. It was eventually replaced by X-Flight. One boat is now used as a prop for Fright Fest in the Six Saints Cemetery along with the rides control panel.
Sky Trail	2010	2014	Ride Entertainment Systems of Stevensville; Maryland Ropes course	County Fair	Located near Demon's entrance, it was removed due to decline in popularity. Spot would be used during Fright Fest as a location for the Six Saints Cemetery and a haunted house called Bloodshed. Part of Wrath of Rakshasa uses this chunk of land.
Yukon Yahoo	1976	1990	Anton Schwarzkopf; Bayern-Kurve	Yukon Territory	Later renamed, moved to Delta Flyer's former location, and took its former name. Removed for the building of the Condor.
Trailblazer	1996	2006	Zamperla; Joker	Southwest Territory	Closed for safety reasons. The ride was very similar to the Scooby Doo Mystery Machine, except this was a western wagon. The main support beam still remains, and the former site was used for the Manslaughter Manor haunted house during Fright Fest and later The Estate at Wretched Meadow haunted house.The giant bull/ox skull that was attached to the top of the main arm sat in storage near Raging Bull and Hurricane Harbor for many years before being pulled out to be used as a Fright Fest prop in the Six Saints Cemetery.
Hometown & Orleans Street Railway trolley cars	1976	Unknown	Custom Fabricators; Trolley	Hometown Square, Orleans Place	Battery-powered cars and track now used for shows and parades. Had a few stops from 1976 until some between the 1980s and mid 1990s in Hometown and Orleans place. Operation as an attraction ceased for unknown reasons. However, guests can still ride the cars in the park's night parade.
Traffique Jam	1976	1984	Arrow Dynamics; Antique Cars	Orleans Place	Removed in 1984 to make room for the Roaring Rapids. One car is now used by the entertainment department for the Party Gras show in the Mardi Gras section of the park.
The Orbit	1976	2016	Anton Schwarzkopf; Enterprise	Hometown Square	Originally located in Orleans and called "Orleans Orbit", was later moved to hometown and renamed. Removed in 2016 to make room for the East River Crawler (now renamed "Lobster" as it originally was called). East River Crawler needed to be relocated from Yankee Harbor (now DC Universe) to make room for The Joker. It was kept in storage for a short time before being mostly scrapped by the end of the 2017 season. One cabin (No.13) and the ride's sign are now used as Fright Fest props for the Six Saints Cemetery.
The Jester's Wild Ride	2004	2016	Zamperla; Rockin' tug	Mardi Gras	Removed in 2016 to make room for The Joker and was put into storage at the park briefly before being relocated to Six Flags Mexico as The Joker y Harley Quinn in 2019. The sign is now used as a prop in the Six Saints Cemetery during Fright Fest.
King Chaos	2004	2017	Huss Rides (Top Spin)	Mardi Gras	Removed in 2017 to make room for a 100 ft tall Larson Super Loop named Mardi Gras Hangover. Was stored in the boneyard until being moved to Indiana Beach in 2024. The sign and the alligator statues that stood in the fountain that was positioned in front of the ride are now used as props in the Six Saints Cemetery during Fright Fest.
The Edge	1983	1985	Intamin; Freefall ride	Orleans Place	Passengers rode in four-seat-cars that were raised on a lift shaft that was similar to an elevator. The car paused at the top for a short time and were then dropped. Near the end, the track curved downwards and riders were placed onto the backs. The riders were then transferred to a separate track and were turned upwards again. The ride lost popularity after an accident in 1984, bringing it to close at the end of 1985.
Bedrock Boulder Roller	1998	2017	Ferris Wheel	Camp Cartoon	Kid sized ferris wheel themed to the Flintstones. Removed at the end of 2017 for unknown reasons. Some of the gondolas are now being used as props in the Six Saints Cemetery during Fright Fest.
Rocky Road Rescue Service	1998	2020	Carousel	Camp Cartoon	A mini-sized carousel themed to the Flintstones. Removed in 2020 after Bedrock Boulder was removed, leaving the section of Camp Cartoon, Bedrock National Forest, to be empty. The cars are now being used as props in the Six Saints Cemetery during Fright Fest.
Dare Devil Dive	1997	2023	Skycoaster	County Fair	A Skycoaster located next to American Eagle, it was removed from the park map as of the 2023 season. It was replaced by Sky Striker, a Zamperla Giga Discovery, debuting for the 2024 season. One of the poles with a loop that riders would grab onto to slow down the ride is now a prop in the Six Saints Cemetery during Fright Fest.
Buccaneer Battle	2009	2021	Water ride	County Fair	A Mack Rides Interactive Boat Ride. Last operated in 2021, and was not operational for the 2022 season. The ride was removed from the park map as of the 2023 season, would remain SBNO until it was demolished in August 2024. It was replaced by Wrath of Rakshasa, a new B&M dive coaster that opened in 2025. One of the pirate ship vehicles, the prop of the pirate clinging on the barrel, and one of the sharks are now props in the Six Saint's Cemetery for Fright Fest.
Mardi Gras Hangover	2018	2023	Larson International (Giga Loop 100 Ft)	Mardi Gras	The ride was the tallest Larson Loop in the world. It replaced King Chaos, a top spin ride which closed at the end of the 2017 season. While Six Flags claims this attraction to be a roller coaster, it fails to meet the definition as it does not use gravity at any point in the ride to 'coast’. Relocated to Niagra Amusement Park in 2024 along with Revolution.
Revolution	2004	2023	Huss Rides (frisbee)	County Fair	Originally operated at Six Flags Great Adventure as Pendulum from 1999 to 2003. A large arm holds the center disk full of riders. The disk begins to spin as the arm swings powerfully back and forth. Maximum height of 65 feet. Removed due to the addition of Sky Striker making it obsolete. Relocated to Niagara Amusement Park along with Mardi Gras Hangover in 2024 and now operates as Midway Mayhem. The rides sign is now used for the Six Saint's Cemetery during Fright Fest.
Pirate's Playship	2007	2023	Interactive Play Ship	Kidzopolis	Interactive Play Ship with nets and slides, originally named SS Feathersword. Removed between late 2023 and early 2024 during off season.
Winner's Circle Go Karts	1999	2025	Go-karts	Yukon Territory	Additional-fee go-karts attraction. Demolished in 2026. Some cars, along with a traffic light are now used as Fright Fest Props. Most of the cars remain in storage.
Crazy Bus	1998	2025	Zamperla	Camp Cartoon	A bus ride that goes up and down. It originally operated as Scooby-Doo's Mystery Machine from 1998 to 2018. It will return in 2027 as Wilderness Wagon
Yahoo River	1976	2025	Thiel	Camp Cartoon	A rotating boat water ride. It originally operated as Yogi's Yahoo River from 1998 to 2018. It will return in 2027 as Creek Cruiser
Buzzy Bees	1998	2010	Barbieri (Roundabout)	Bugs Bunny National Park	Rotating bee ride. Riders could raise and lower the bee. Briefly returned in 2012 before returning to storage. It will return as Bee Boppin' in 2027

== Show venues ==
Name	Year Opened	Year Closed	Location In Park	Description
Orleans Bandstand	1976	2003	Orleans Place (now Mardi Gras)	Small gazebo that the Orleans' marching band would play in, replaced by Big Easy Balloons
Theatre Royale	1976	2007	Orleans Place	Theater similar to the Grand Music Hall, now used for the queue of The Dark Knight Coaster.
IgNight Stage	2013	2014	Hometown Square	A temporary multi-level stage for the show IgNight – Grand Finale for the 2013 season, temporarily replacing the Hometown Square Stage.
Southwest Amphitheater	1993	2015	Southwest Territory	Large amphitheater that was originally built for the Batman Stunt Show, also housed W.B. Western Stunt Show and Spy Girl Stunt Show, replaced by Justice League: Battle for Metropolis.
Yukon Poles	1976	Unknown	Yukon Territory	Two vertical poles that were placed near Mooseburger's Lodge that actors dressed as lumberjacks would climb.
Pictorium	1979	2018	Carousel Plaza	An IMAX theater that showed different films until 2016. During Fright Fest, it was home to Susan Rosen's illusionist show. Removed to make room for Maxx Force, a roller coaster that opened in 2019, and Tsunami Surge, a Master Blaster water coaster built at the adjacent Hurricane Harbor which opened in 2021.

== Themed areas ==
Name	Year opened	Year replaced	Replaced by	Description
Bugs Bunny National Park	1998	2009/2010	Winner's Circle Go Karts and Little Dipper	Opened in 1998 as a subsection in Yukon Territory and included The Looney Tooter (Zamperla Rio Grande – kiddie train ride), Looney Tunes Lodge (SCS Interactive kiddie foam ball play area), Waddaview National Park Charter Service (Herschell kiddie ride), Porky's Buzzy Beez (kiddie ride), Petunia's Love Bugz, originally from Hometown Park, and Pepe Le Pew's Peak. Petunia's Love Bugz and Pepe Le Pew's Peak were removed after the 2009 season to make room for the Little Dipper coaster; the rest of the area closed after the 2010 season. Porky's Buzzy Beez was brought back into the park in 2012 where it operated in East River Crawler's location. Cars from the Buzzy Beez and one ride from the area are now used as props for Fright fest. Love Bugz was later brought back in 2015 and renamed to "Lady Bugs," for the new section called Hometown Park in Hometown Square.
Yankee Harbor	1976	2022	DC Universe	A themed area based on a New England harbor, with a lake surrounding the now The Flash: Vertical Velocity and Aquaman Splashdown (formerly Vertical Velocity and Yankee Clipper). It opened as an original section of the park in 1976, connected between Orleans Place (now Mardi Gras) and Yukon Territory. It was later replaced with DC Universe, which is a themed area based around DC Comics heroes and villains, which opened in 2022 with three re-imagined rides, overhauling the former themed area. The removal of Yankee Harbor became the first ever original themed area in the park to be completely re-themed. The original Vertical Velocity sign, Yankee Clipper's sign, East River Crawler's sign and Whirligig's sign are now props in the Six Saints Cemetery for Fright Fest, but the rides have no gravestones as they are still present in the park, just renamed. In 2026 for the 50th anniversary of the park, the original Yankee Harbor soundtrack was played in the DC Universe area
Camp Cartoon	1998	2026	—N/a	Formerly known as Camp Cartoon Network, the kids area was located within Yukon Territory. It was demolished in 2026. In the season prior to its demolition, it contained three rides: Sprocket Rockets, Yahoo River, and Crazy Bus, the latter two were dismantled.

== See also ==
- List of Six Flags Great America attractions
