= Columbia (carousel) =

Two carousels in the United States

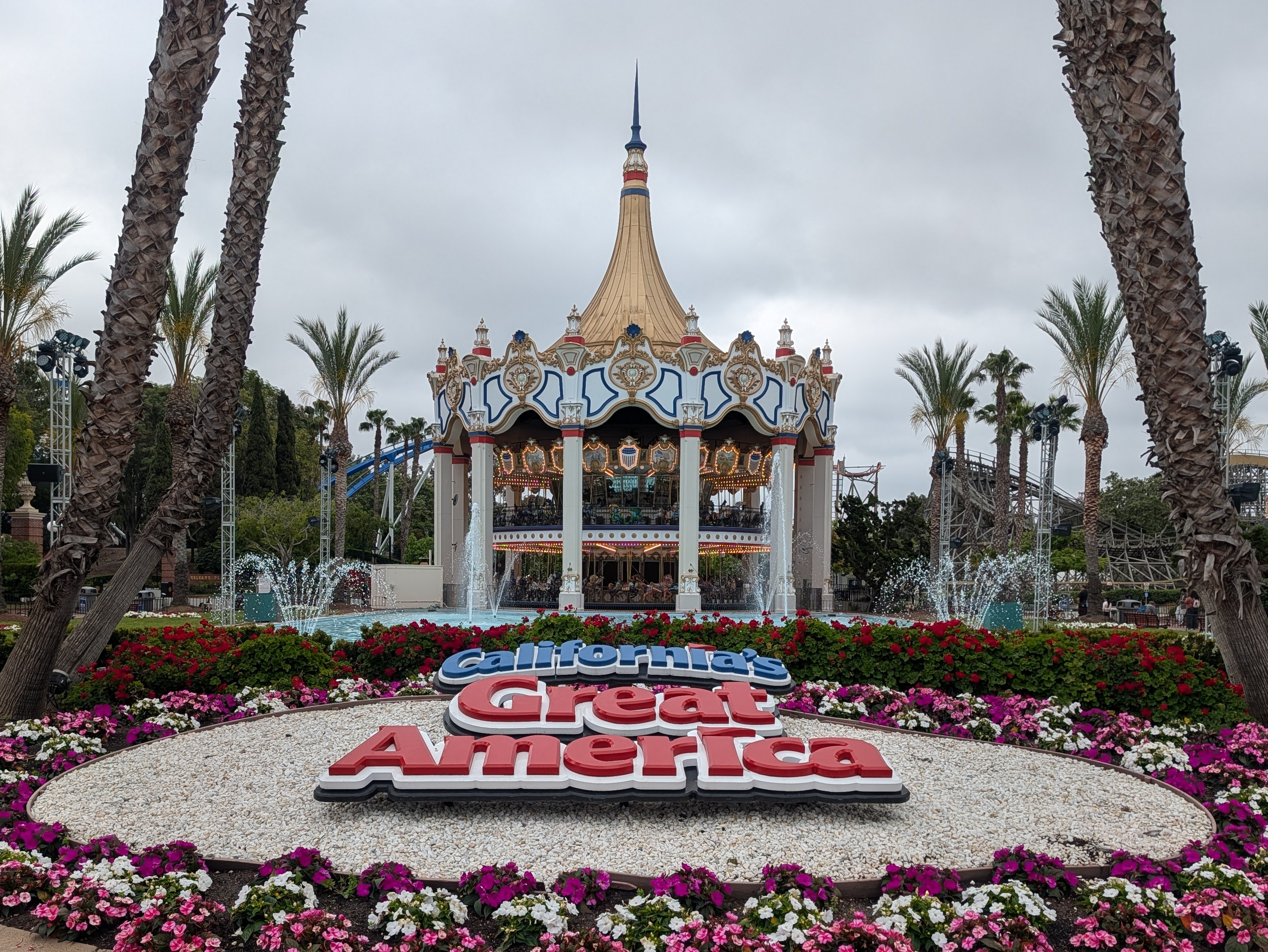

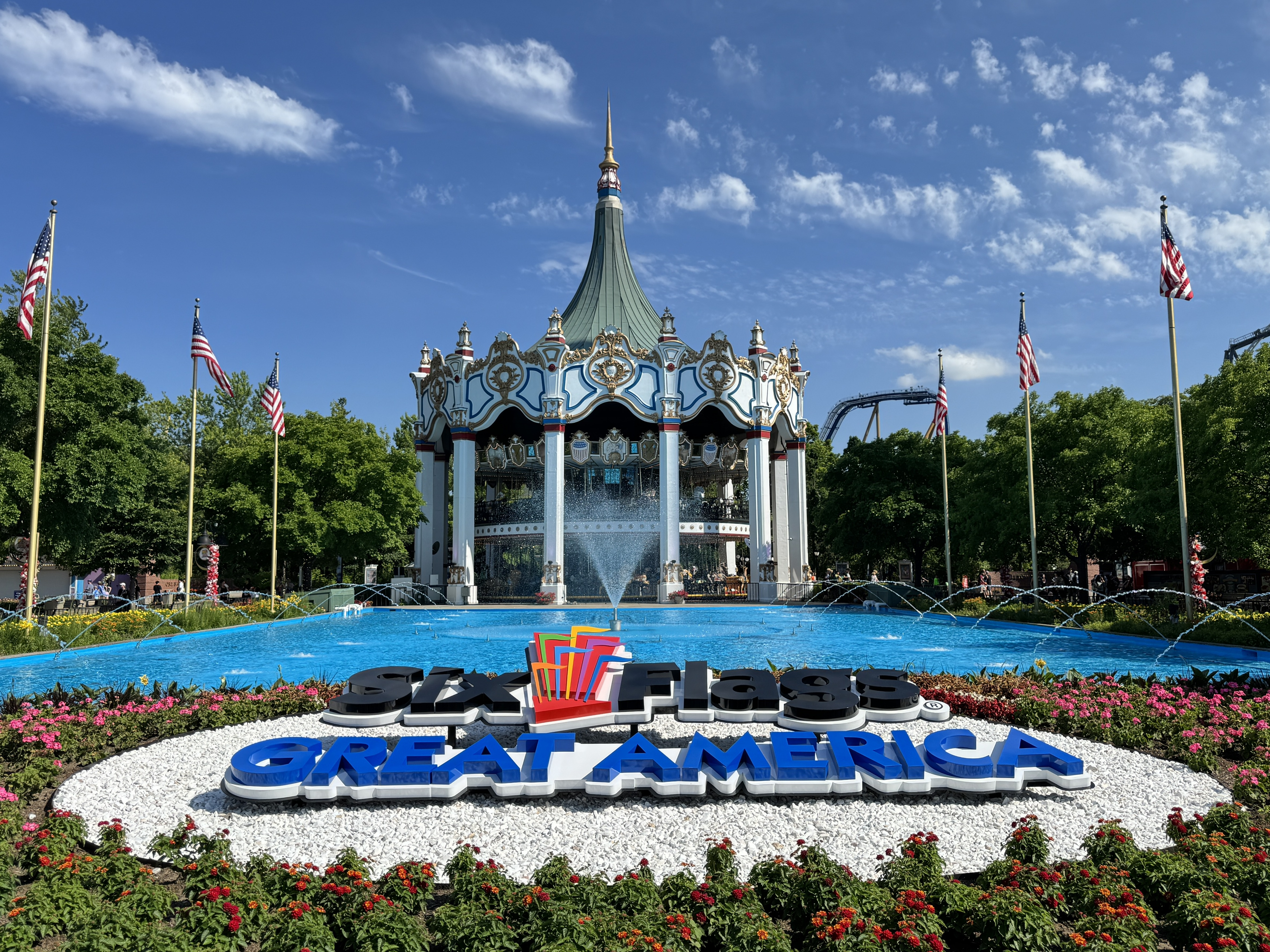
- Picture 1: Carousel Columbia at California's Great America (May 2026); Picture 2: Columbia Carousel at Six Flags Great America (June 2026)

California's Great America
- Name: Carousel Columbia
- Area: Celebration Plaza
- Status: Operating
- Cost: $1,500,000
- Opening date: March 20, 1976; 50 years ago

Six Flags Great America
- Name: Columbia Carousel
- Area: Carousel Plaza
- Status: Operating
- Cost: $1,500,000
- Opening date: May 29, 1976; 50 years ago

Ride statistics
- Attraction type: Carousel
- Manufacturer: Chance Rides
- Model: Double-Decker Carousel
- Height: 100–101 ft (30–31 m)
- Vehicles: Over 100
- Riders per vehicle: 1 per animal; 6 per bench
- Previously known as: The Columbia

Carousel Columbia and Columbia Carousel are a pair of double-decker carousels at California's Great America in Santa Clara, California, and Six Flags Great America in Gurnee, Illinois, respectively. The California carousel is the tallest carousel in the world at 101 feet (31 m) tall, while the Illinois carousel is 100 feet (30 m) tall.

First opening as the Columbia in 1976, the double-decker carousels were built as original rides under the Marriott Corporation, as both parks used to have near identical layouts. Both parks are now owned by the Six Flags Entertainment Corporation following the merger of Cedar Fair, who was the owner of California's Great America, and Six Flags, who was the owner of Six Flags Great America. On November 6, 2026, Six Flags announced that California’s Great America would be permanently closing on September 6, 2027.

== History ==
Identical double-decker carousels, initially referred to as The Columbia, were constructed as the entrance centerpieces of both Marriott's Great America parks (now known as California's Great America and Six Flags Great America). The carousel in Santa Clara opened on March 20, 1976, as the tallest carousel in the world. The carousel in Gurnee opened on May 29, 1976, as the second tallest in the world.

In 1994, Santa Clara's Columbia received some minor renovations for its appearance in the movie Beverly Hills Cop III, filmed at the theme park.

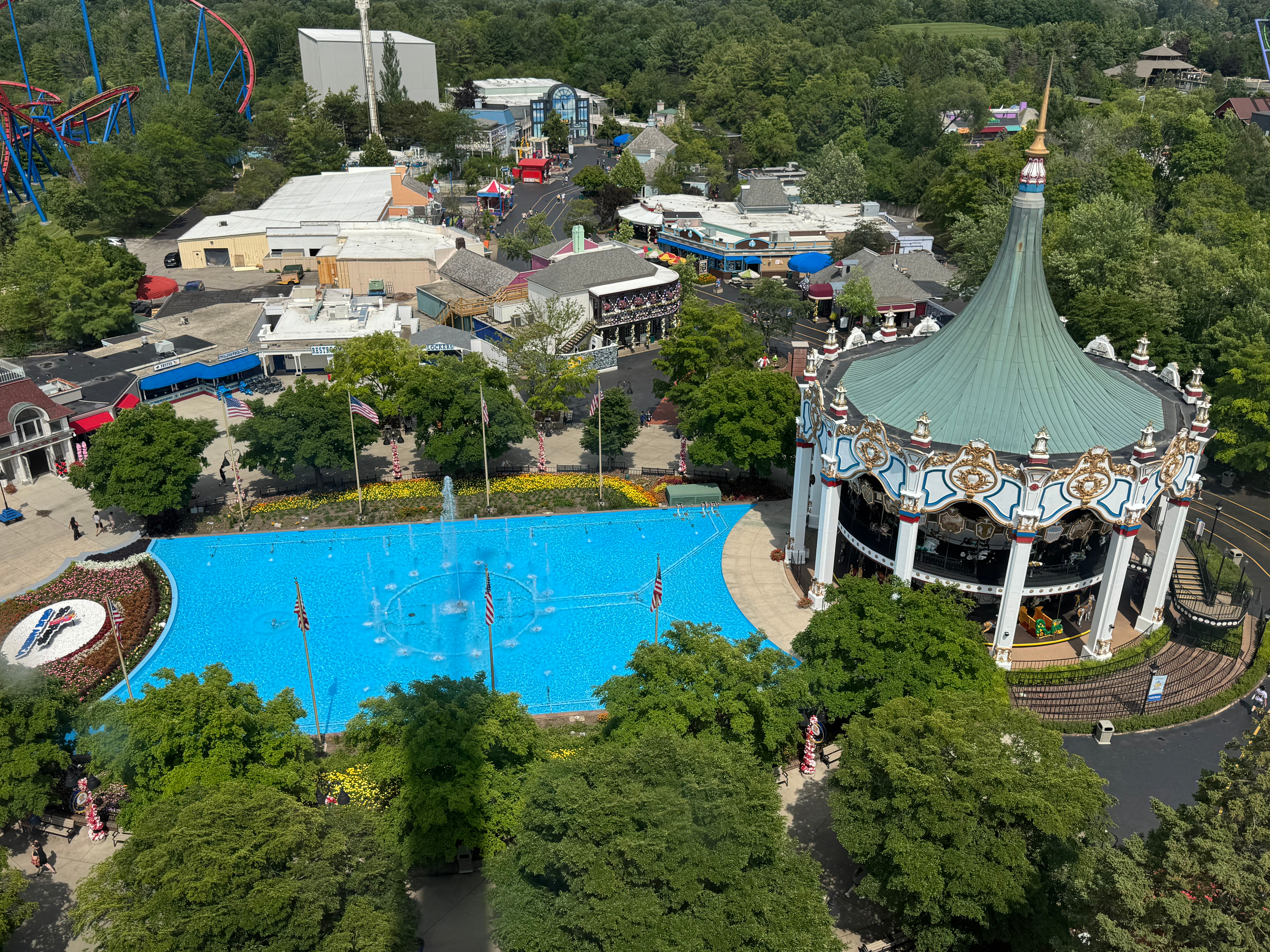
Six Flags Great America's Columbia Carousel fountains from Sky Trek Tower in late-June 2026.

For the 2026 season, the reflection pool in front of Gurnee's Columbia Carousel at Six Flags Great America was upgraded to feature a flowerbed. Designed similarly to California's Great America's flowerbed, the addition was part of Six Flags Great America's 50th anniversary renovations. Additionally, decorative fountains were added to Gurnee's pond in June 2026.

== Design ==
The original design of the carousel, then named "The Columbia", was carried out by Randall Duell Associates. Additional scrollwork and decorations were designed by Chris Mueller.

Each of the 103 horses and animals on the carousels is a replica of one of the world's most famous carved carousel animals. A large reflecting pond was installed in front of each carousel with historic replicas of American flags flying along the sides of the pond.

Sixteen original oil paintings by George Gibson are installed on each carousel, depicting scenes from American history. Kris Rowberry publicized the fact, originally from the press release, that elements from Carousel Columbia were originally used on the sets of the films Marie Antoinette (1938) and The Swan (1956).

At 101 ft (31 m) tall, the Carousel Columbia in Santa Clara is the tallest carousel in the world. The sister Columbia Carousel in Gurnee stands just one foot shorter at 100 ft (30 m). The two sister carousels may be distinguished by the color of the roof – the Carousel Columbia in California is painted gold, while the Columbia Carousel in Illinois is green – and the flooring – the upper-level of Gurnee's carousel has carpet, while Santa Clara's has a wood floor.

The Columbia is often associated with the Carousel Song, written especially for the Marriott's Great America theme parks by Gene Patrick. The Carousel Song plays at the Santa Clara park periodically throughout the day and plays at the Gurnee park when the park closes.

=== Animals ===
Seating on the carousel consists of the following 106 fiberglass replicas:

- 88 horses (82 jumping and 6 standing)
- 3 chariots
- 1 camel
- 1 giraffe
- 1 lion
- 1 tiger
- 1 dragon
- 1 deer
- 1 seahorse
- 2 jumping ostriches
- 2 jumping pigs
- 2 jumping cats
- 2 jumping rabbits

The horses include cavalry-style horses, Parker horses, Dentzel horses, and the 1928 "Silver Anniversary Horse" originally carved for the 25th anniversary of the Philadelphia Toboggan Company (found on the Gurnee carousel only). The original 1928 armored horse is displayed in the Circus Hall of Fame. The chariots are replicas of chariots originally carved in 1918 by Daniel Carl Muller.

== Gallery ==
=== Carousel Columbia (California) ===
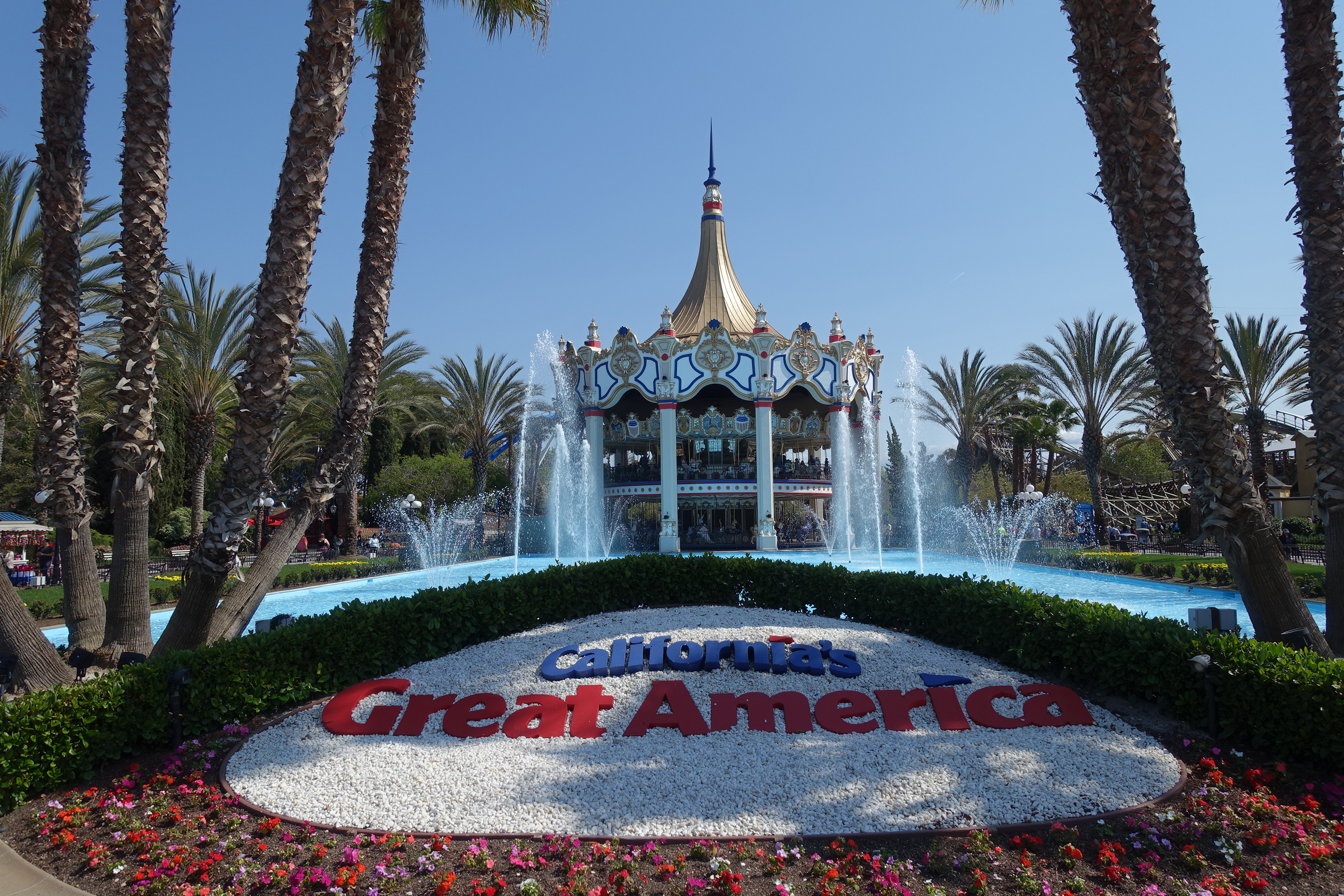
Carousel Columbia at California's Great America

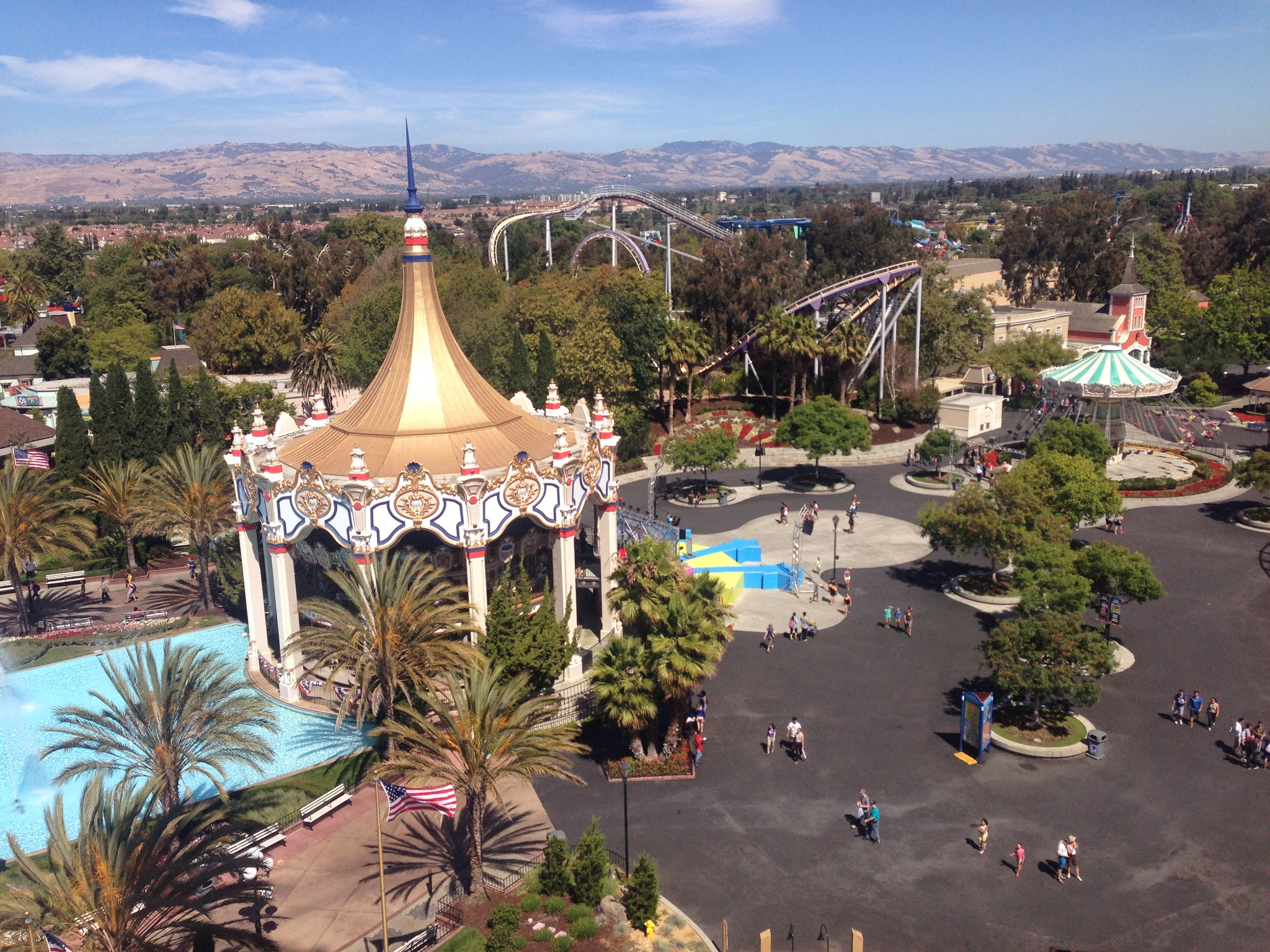
Carousel Columbia (2014)

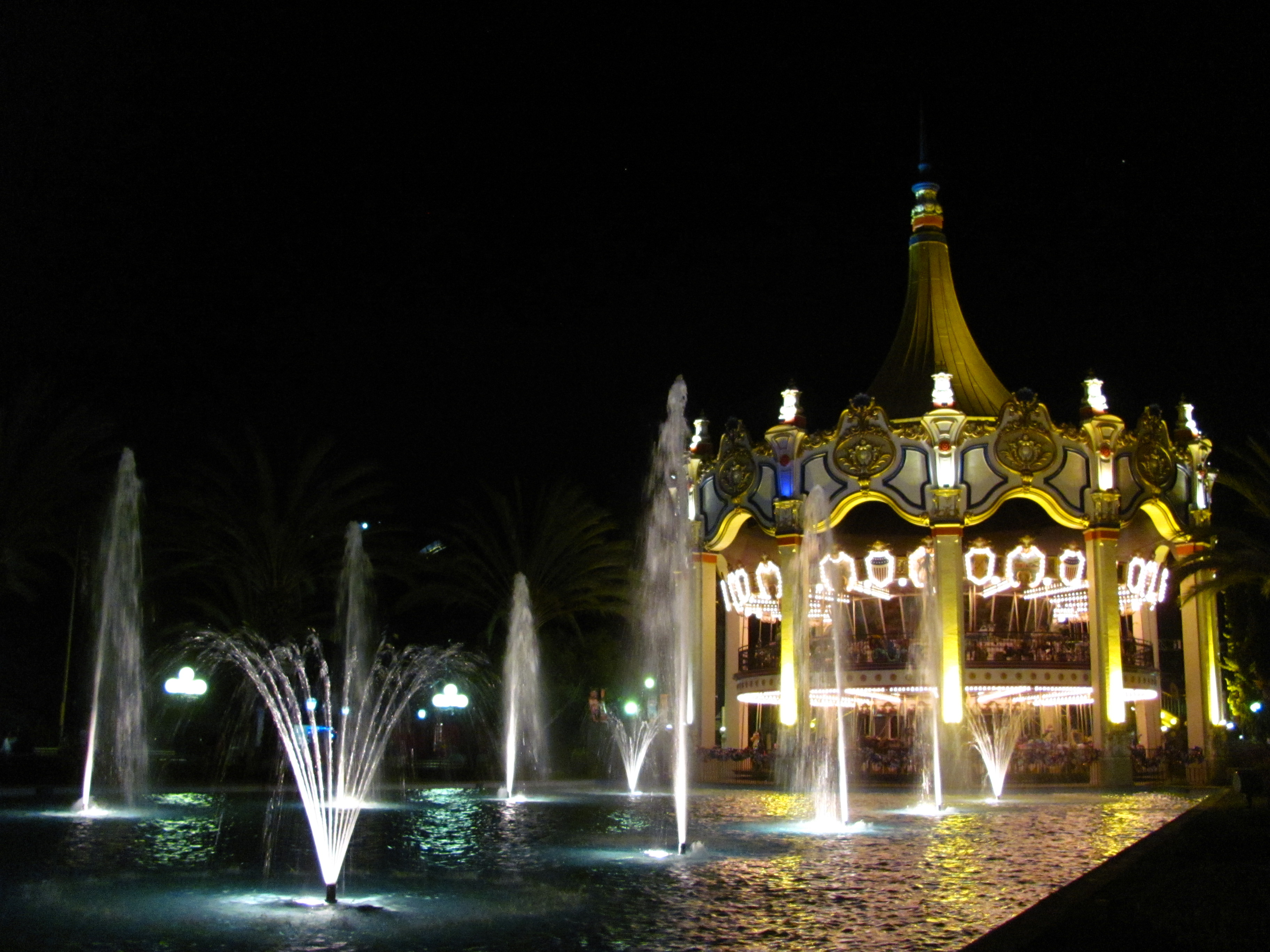
Carousel Columbia at night (2016)

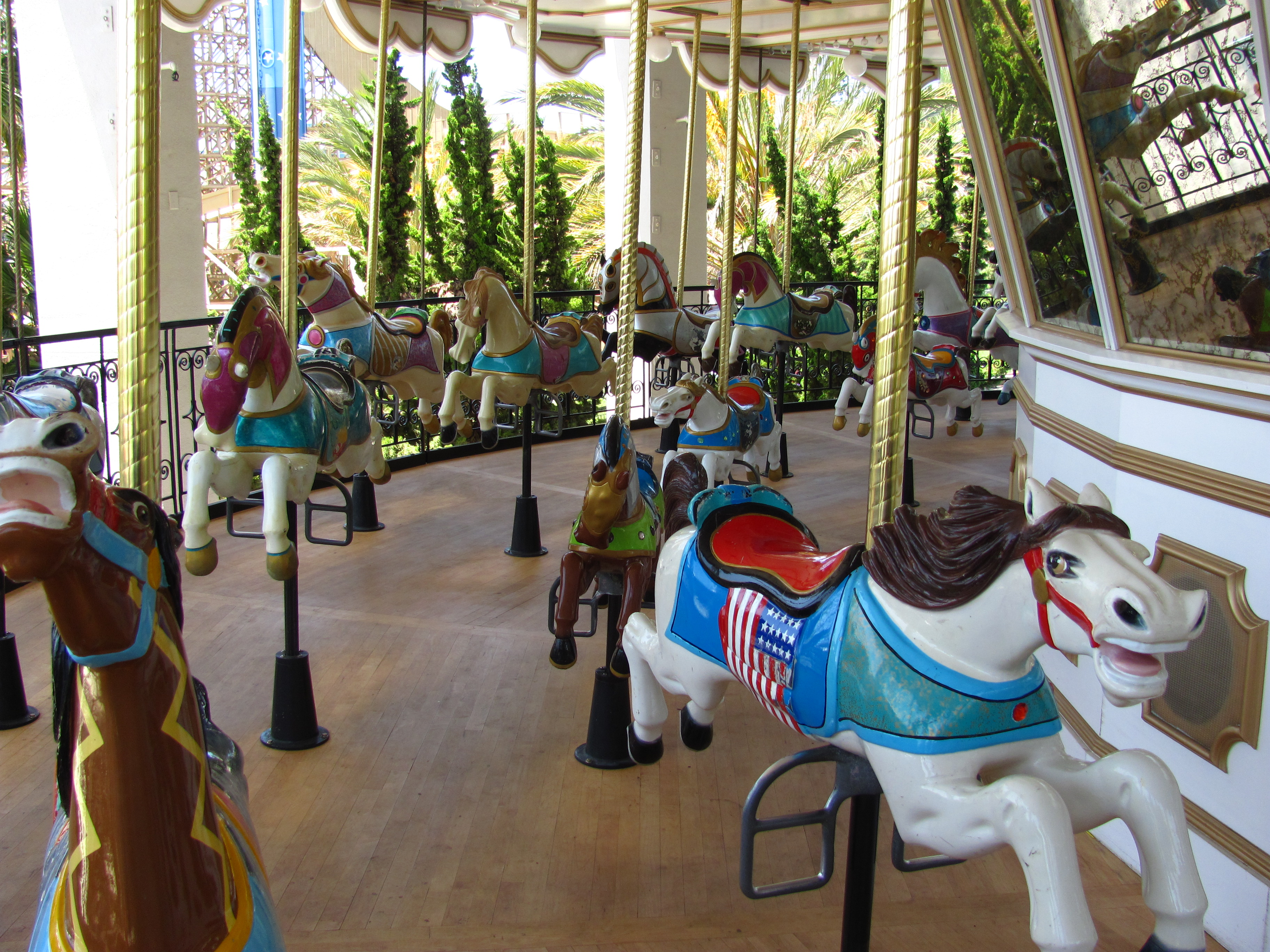
Jumping horses on Carousel Columbia

=== Columbia Carousel (Illinois) ===
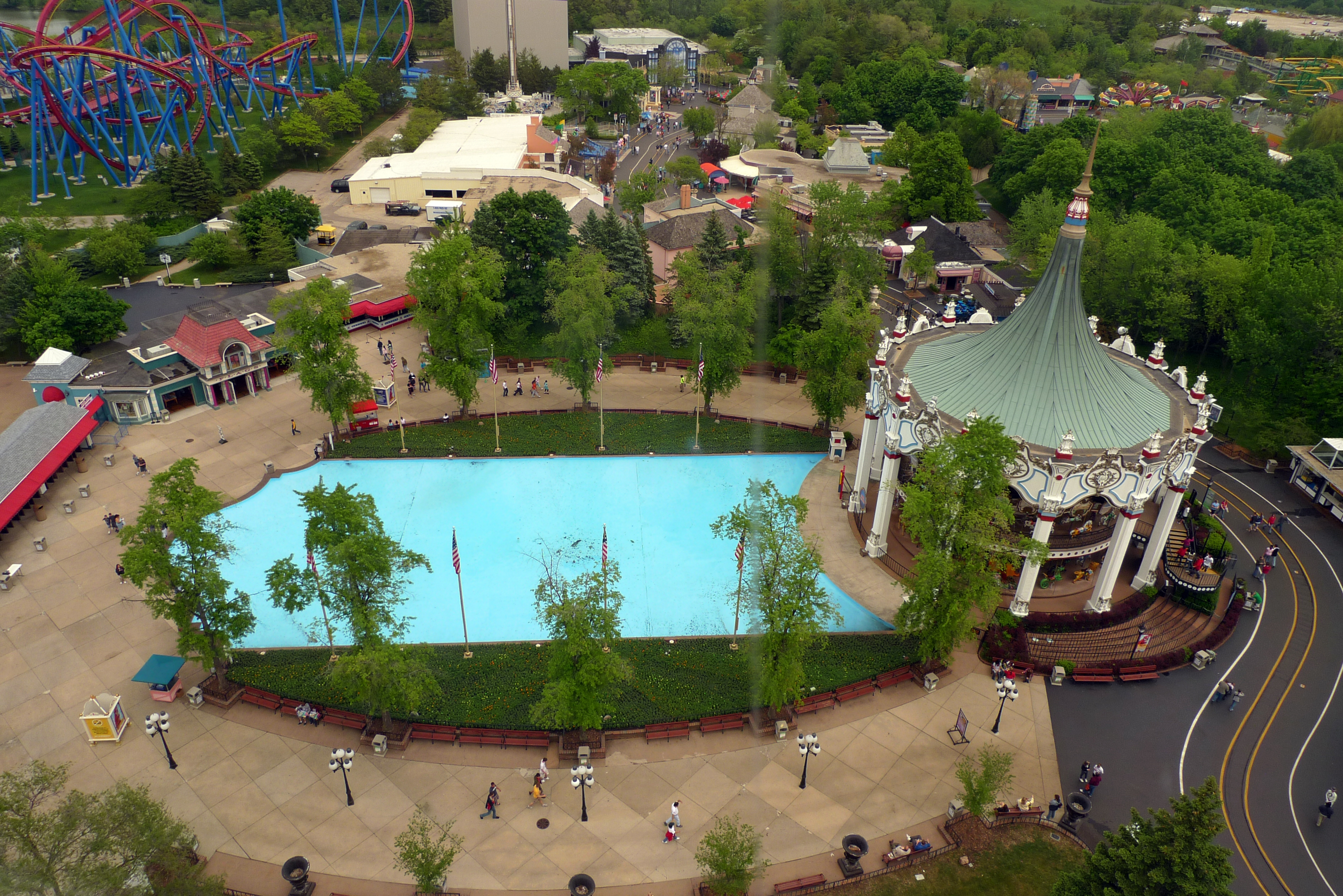
Columbia Carousel at Six Flags Great America

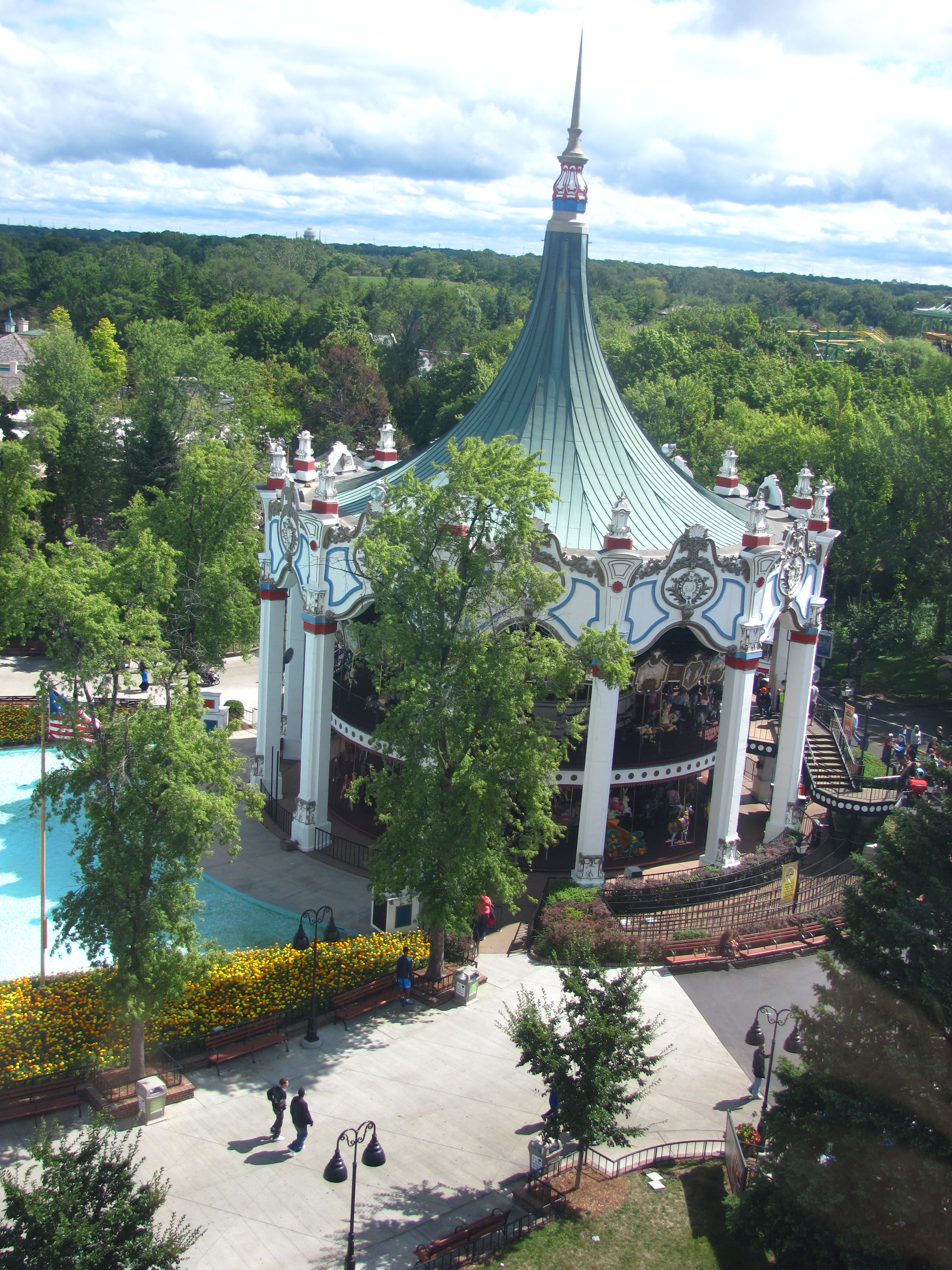
Columbia Carousel (2011)

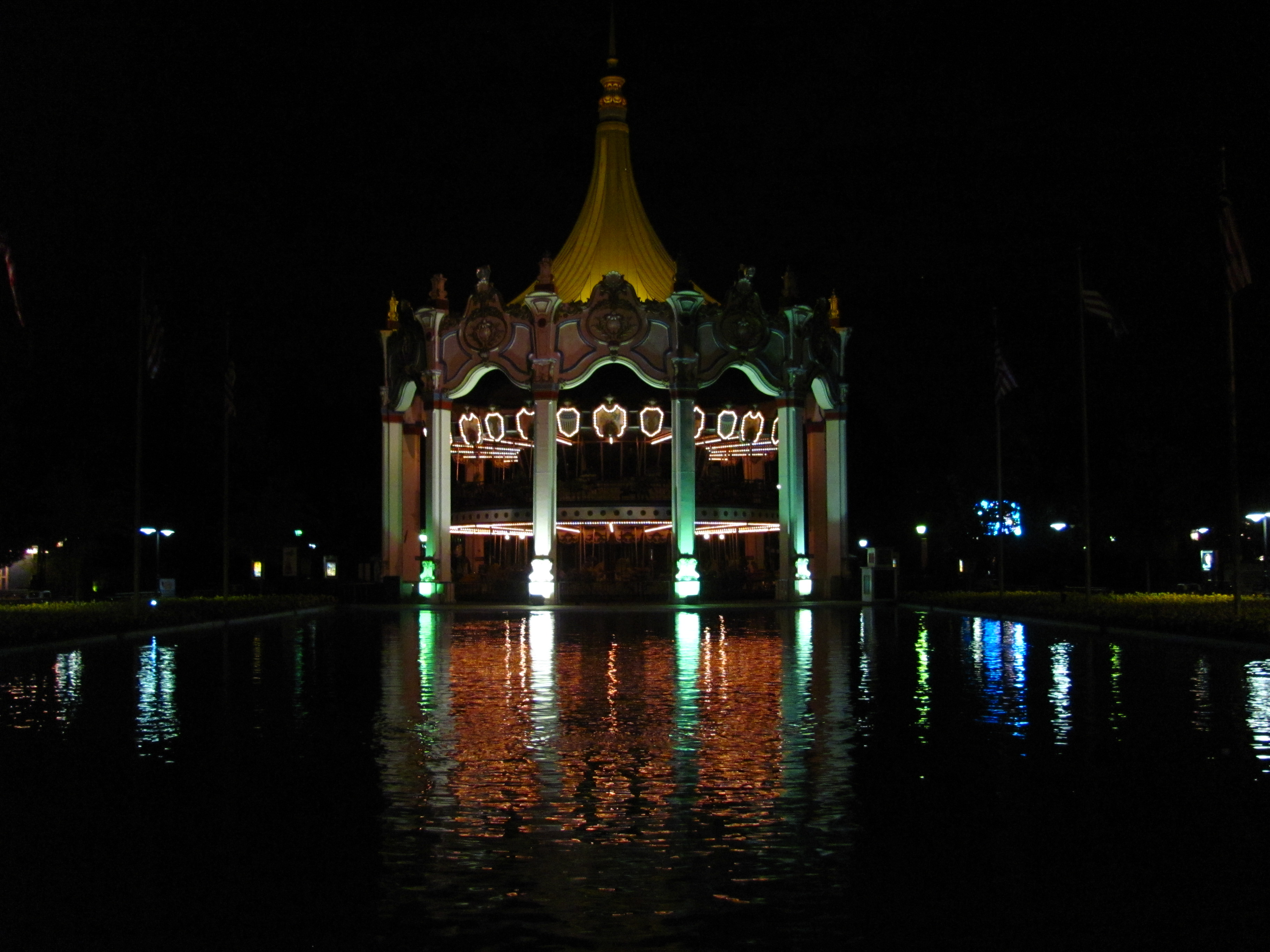
Columbia Carousel at night (2014)

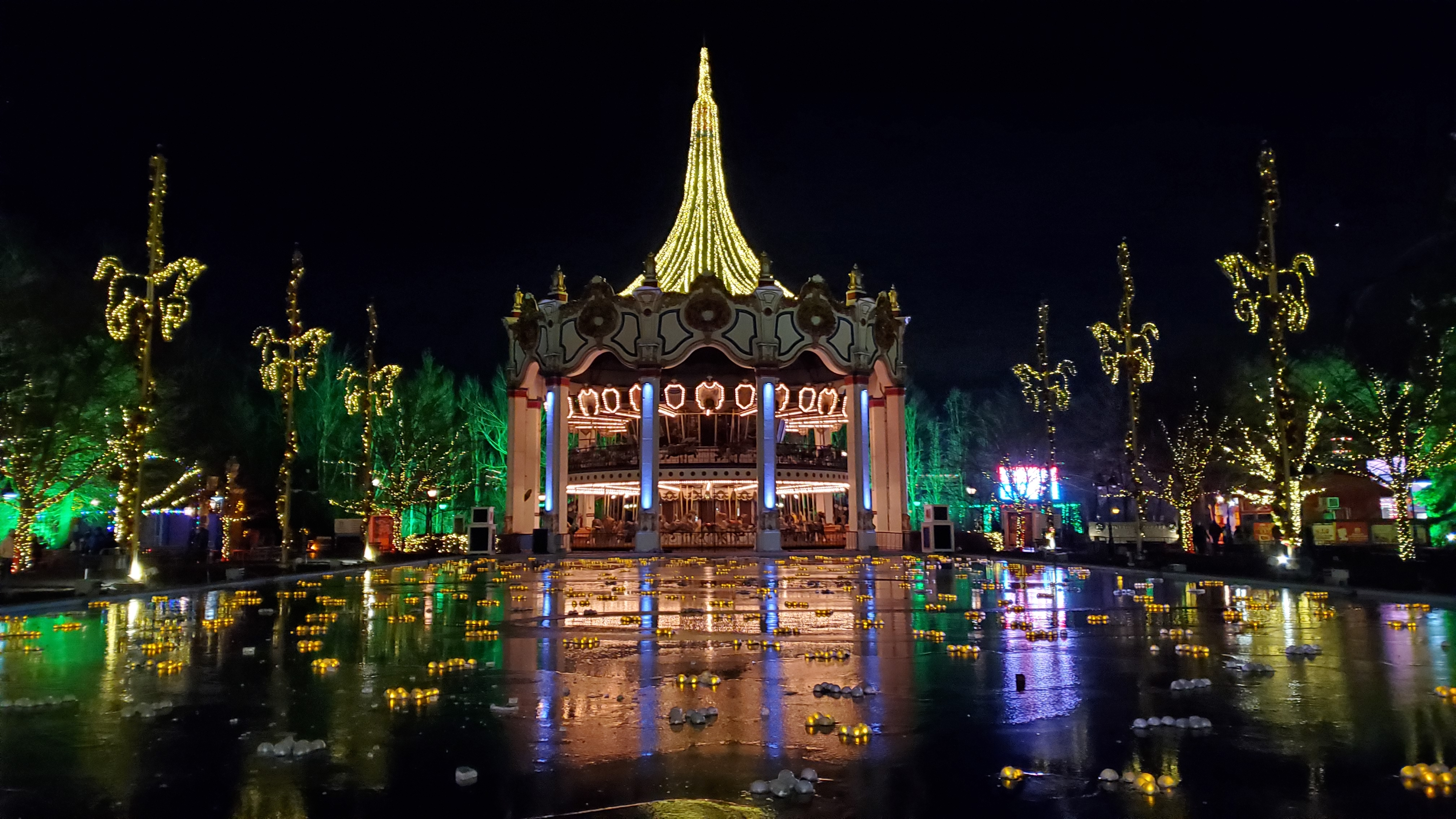
Columbia Carousel during Holiday in the Park (2020)

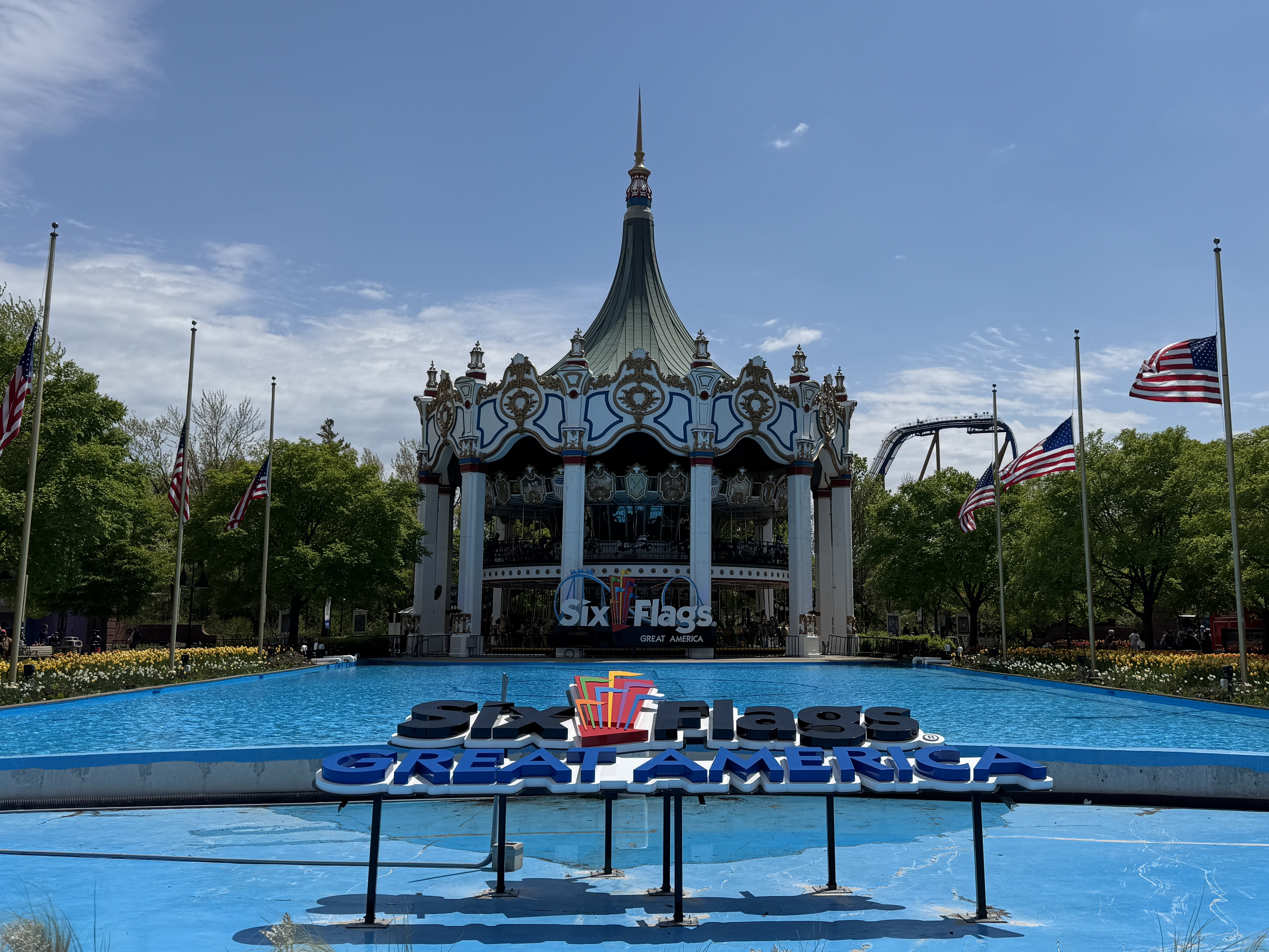
Columbia Carousel flowerbed progress in May 2026

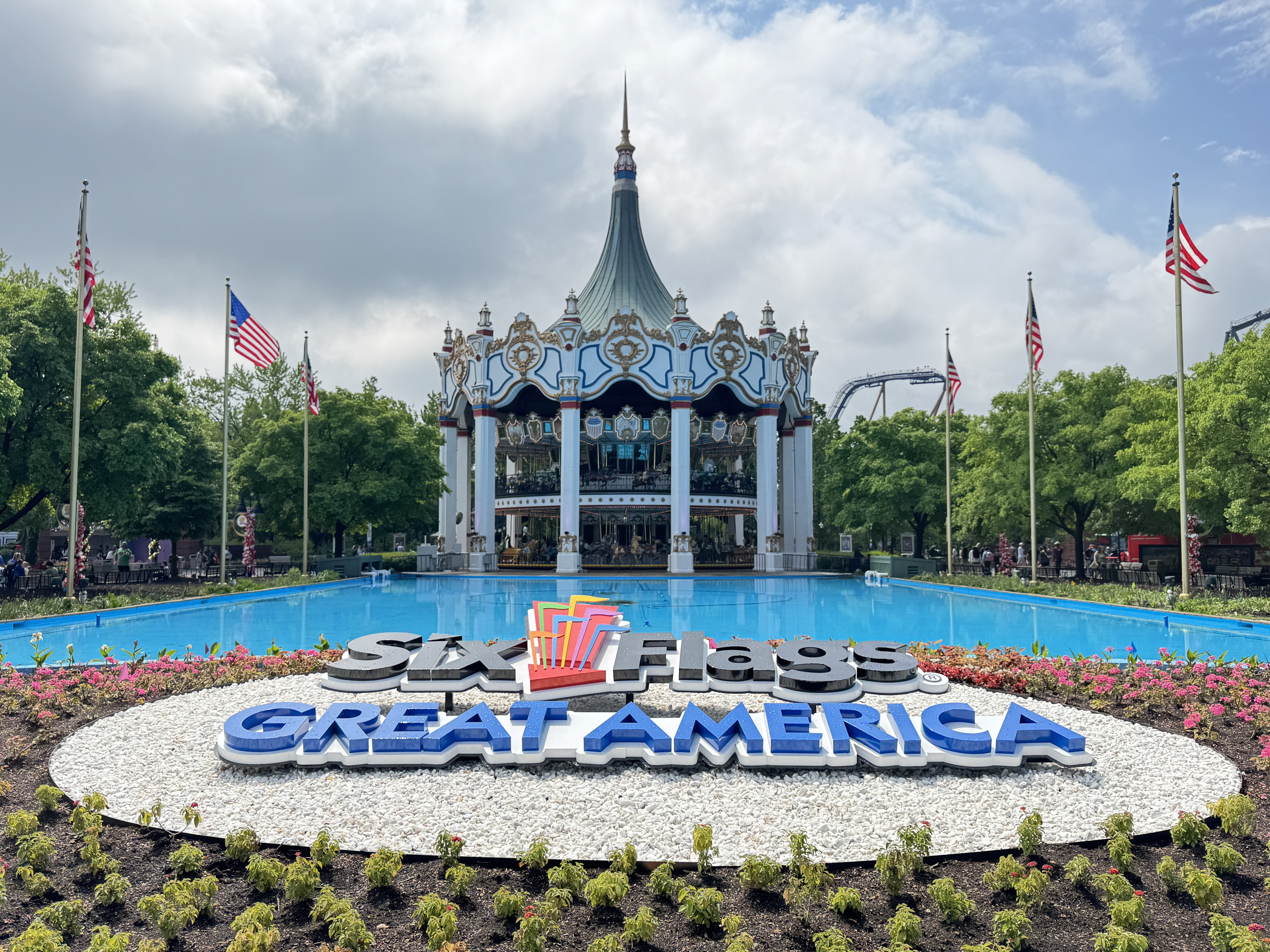
The flowerbed and pond without fountains in May 2026

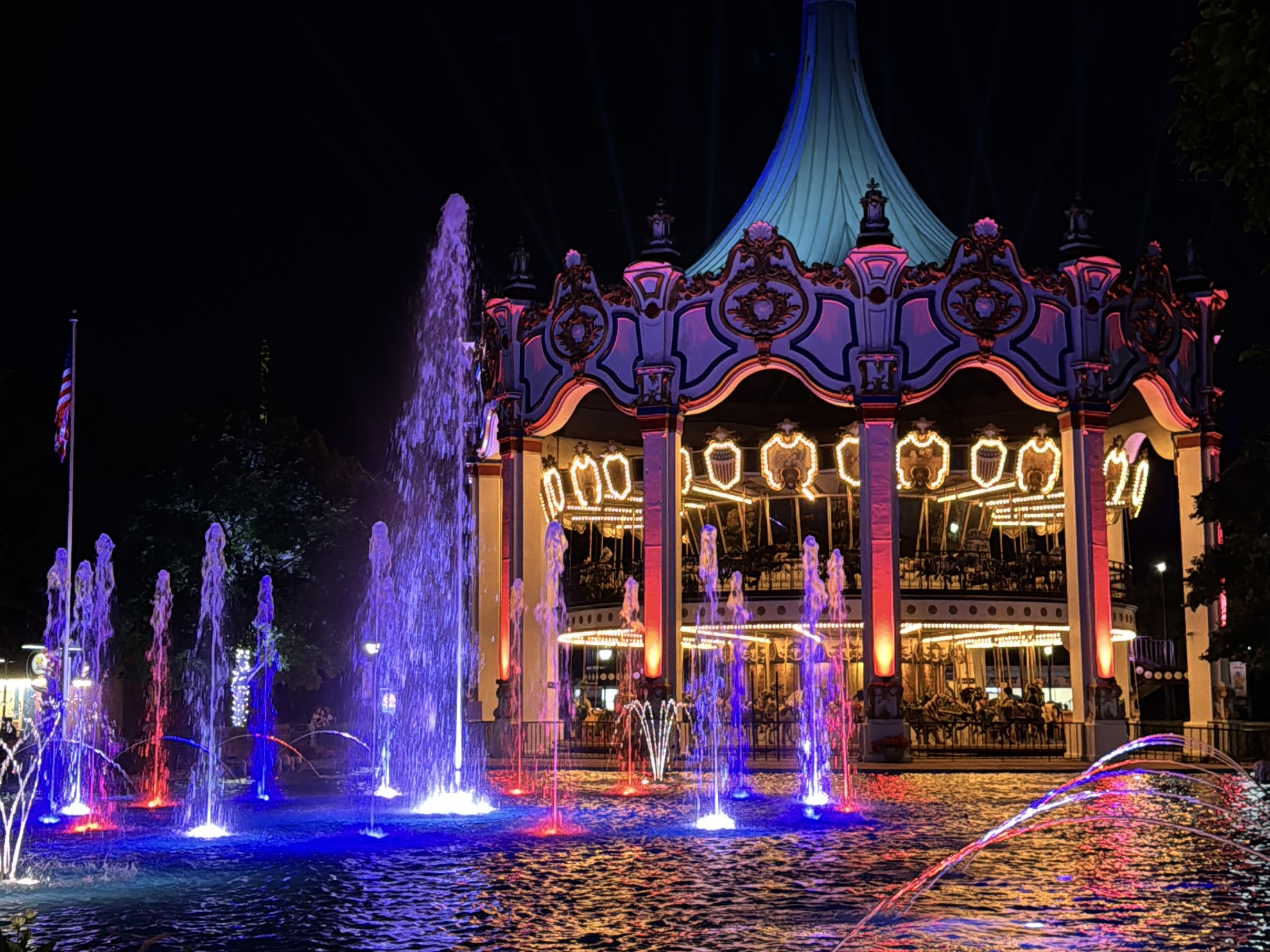
The Columbia Carousel and fountains at night in 2026
