= Kiddieland Amusement Park =

Former amusement park in Melrose Park, Illinois, United States

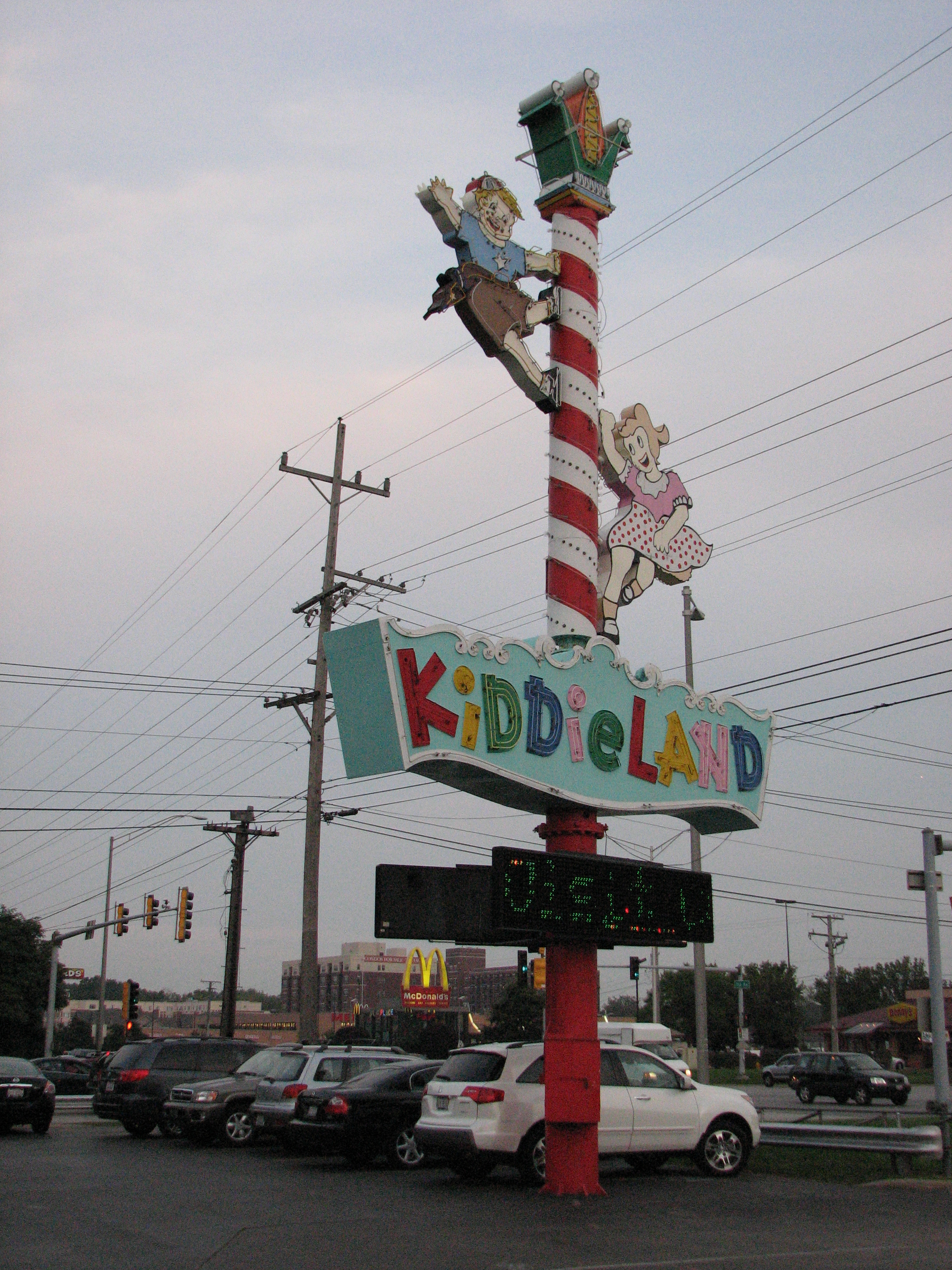
- Sign at the front of Kiddieland
- Interactive map of Kiddieland Amusement Park
- Location: Melrose Park, Illinois, U.S.
- Coordinates: 41.9094°N 87.8364°W
- Status: Defunct
- Opened: 1929
- Closed: September 27, 2009
- Owner: Family owned and operated
- Operating season: May – September

Attractions
- Total: 27
- Roller coasters: 1

Kiddieland Amusement Park (stylized as "KiDDieLAND") was an amusement park located at the corner of North Avenue and First Avenue in Melrose Park, Illinois. It was home to several classic rides including the Little Dipper roller coaster, which opened in 1950. The park closed on September 27, 2009, and was demolished in 2010 to make way for a new Costco store. The sign for the amusement park was preserved and relocated to the parking lot next to the Melrose Park Public Library.

== History ==
Kiddieland started out as a small venture of Arthur Fritz, a local builder and contractor. In 1929, he purchased six ponies and offered rides to local children. Miniature gasoline-powered cars were added a few years later after Fritz learned that they were being given away to children by a Chicago newspaper as a subscription promotion. By the 1930s, Fritz was calling his collection of amusements Kiddieland; the attractions were primarily sized and geared towards younger children.

In 1940, Fritz added the German Carousel, two miniature steam locomotives, the Little Auto Ride, the Roto Whip and a Ferris wheel. The Roto Whip and Ferris wheel would remain as rides until the park's closing. The park saw its first major expansion in the 1950s with the addition of the Little Dipper and the merry-go-round. Fritz's adult children also became more involved in the park at this time. The 1960s saw bumper cars replace the original pony ride, as well as the unexpected death of Fritz in 1967.

The park transferred ownership in 1977, as three of Fritz's grandchildren took over the park and its operation. The park continued its expansion over the next several decades and installed several major attractions, including a log flume, a swinging pirate ship, a 40-foot (12 m) long water coaster, and numerous other attractions.

=== Closure ===
A dispute developed between Shirley and Glenn Rynes, who owned the land that Kiddieland occupied, and Ronald Rynes, Jr. and Cathy and Tom Norini, who owned the amusement park itself. The landowners sued the park owners in 2004, claiming that the park had an improper insurance policy and that fireworks were prohibited in the lease. The case was thrown out in a Cook County court and later in an appeals court. The landowners declined to extend the lease on the land in early 2009.

In October 2009, the park closed to the public, and the rides were auctioned. The remaining buildings were demolished to make way for a Costco store the following year. In 2012, a section of Melrose Park's 1st Avenue was honorarily named Kiddieland Amusement Park Road.

== Rides and attractions ==
Ride	Picture	Year opened	Year closed	Description
Boats		1949	2009	Built by Allan Herschell Co.
Tractors		1958	1994	Six gas-powered tractors that could be driven between guardrails (not on tracks) by children with an optional standing platform in back for adults. Tractors were painted two green to represent John Deere, three red to represent International Harvester and one yellow to represent Allis-Chalmers. Trackway removed by the 1995 season to make way for rides displaced by a new food court. Tractors kept in storage until 2009. Tractors were not sold at the closing auction. The family kept one; as of 2020 Thoosie Rocco Casella owns another; some additional trucks were located at a private collector's house when the Kiddieland firetrucks were rescued in 2022.
Dune Buggies		1971	2009	Built by Hampton Amusement Co.
Large Ferris Wheel		1940	2009	Eli Bridge Co. No. 5 Type Ferris Wheel. Relocated to Nelis' Dutch Village. It was combined with a reproduction of the de Grosmolen windmill in Hoogmade, Netherlands and renamed Harry's Windmill Ride.
Flying Saucers		1966	2009	Most likely now in a traveling fair circuit. The unit seen in this video has the same colored saucers with the same nameplates with the names of the planets it had at Kiddieland. Unknown who the showman is and where this fair was in the footage. https://www.youtube.com/watch?v=cM6QJRG1NNQ
Galleon		1986	2009	Built by Zamperla. Was relocated to Gillian's Funland in Sea Isle City, New Jersey, but status is unknown after park closed in 2013 due to the costs of damage caused by Hurricane Sandy.
German Carousel		1962	2009	Replaced the Pony track, Built by Wilhelm Hennecke of Uelzen, Germany. Special ordered by Fritz for Kiddieland. Sold at auto auction for $557,000 to a private car collector in Canada. Was last seen in Arizona auction.
Kiddie Swings		2008	2009	
Kiddieland Limited Steam Engines		1941 & 1949	2009	Two 14 in (356 mm) gauge miniature railway streamlined steam locomotives. One, a 4-6-4 Hudson (Challenger), was built in 1941, and the other, a 4-8-4 Northern (Overland), was built in 1949, both by Wagner & Son Manufacturing of Plainfield, IL to replace two earlier Steam Engines. The Hudson was sold to Hesston Steam Museum in 1982. The Northern stayed at Kiddieland until 2009 and was bought by Bill McEnery of Gas City. The Northern was leased by McEnery to the Hesston Steam Museum in Indiana and operated for the 2010 and 2011 seasons. The Northern was purchased outright by the Museum after McEnery filed for bankruptcy.
Kiddieland Limited Diesel Trains		1950 & 1953	2009	14 in (356 mm) gauge diesel-powered engines based off the EMD F2 Design with streamlined coach sets built by the Miniature Train Co. of Rensselaer, Indiana. One A-B Unit Set consisting of two engines (No. 514) built in 1950, and one A Unit Set consisting of one engine (No. 704) built in 1953. The diesels were bought by Bill McEnery of Gas City at auction after the park closed, it is unknown however if they have been sold or scrapped after McEnery filed for bankruptcy.
Midge-O-Racers		1954	2009	Built by Eyerly. Now located at Santa's Village AZoosment Park
Mushroom Ride		1979	2009	Built by Chance Rides, Relocated to Lake Winnepesaukah in Rossville, Georgia, renamed Silly Saucers.
Lava Run Hand Cars		1950	2009	Originally operated with Hodges Amusement & Manufacturing Co. Hand Cars, Original Hand Cars replaced with Push-Petal "Ore Cars" around 2000. Push-Petal cars Relocated to Nelis' Dutch Village in Holland, Michigan and renamed Petal Pumper Cars.
Little Autos		1939	1954	Replaced with Midge-O-Racers
Little Dipper		1950	2009	Designed by Herbert Schmeck and built by the Philadelphia Toboggan Company in 1950. The brakes are operated manually by a wooden handle in the station. The out-and-back coaster is 24 feet (7.3 m) tall and travels a course of 700 feet (210 m). It was awarded the ACE Coaster Classic award by the American Coaster Enthusiasts. The ride was relocated to Six Flags Great America after Kiddieland's closure.
Little Ferris Wheel		1951	2009	Now at the Volo Museum in Volo, Illinois.
Log Jammer		1992	2009	Being relocated to Santa's Village AZoosment Park after sitting in storage at Wisconsin's Little Amerricka. Was planned to reopen as Yule Tide Plunge in 2022, but plans never progressed since it was announced. Was quietly scrapped.
Merry-Go-Round		1949	2009	Built by the Philadelphia Toboggan Company as Carousel No. 72 in 1925, Operated at Lakewood Park in Waterbury, Connecticut from 1929 to 1945, Refurbished by PTC and operated at Kiddieland from 1949 to 2009. Relocated to Sonny's Place in Somers, Connecticut in 2017. The hand carved horses are in the process of being restored by The Carousel Museum.
Pipeline		1995	2009	
Polyp		1967	2009	Built by Kaspar Klaus of Memmingen, Germany, Relocated to and operated at Lake Winnepesaukah from 2009 until 2020. Relocated to Indiana Beach Amusement and Water Park, in Monticello, Indiana. Now known as Sea Warrior.
Raceabouts		1982	2009	Roughly 0.19 Mile (303.7 m) Huss-Arrow Antique Touring Car Track.
Scooters		1962	2009	Replaced the Pony track, Built by Gebrüder Ihle of Bruchsal, Germany, imported to Kiddieland via Hot Rods Inc. of New York City, NY, Sold to Jeff Kimble who resold it to a collector in Texas.
Scrambler		1966	2009	Built by Eli Bridge Co. Relocated to Gillians Funland in Sea Isle City, New Jersey, before quickly being moved to the larger and nearby Gillian's Wonderland Pier in Ocean City, New Jersey before being removed after 2016. The fate of this unit is unknown.
Sky Fighters		1950	2009	Built by Allan Herschell Co.
Tilt-A-Whirl		1962	2009	Replaced the Pony track, Built by Sellner Manufacturing Co. Was relocated to Gillian's Funland in Sea Isle City, New Jersey, but status is unknown after the park closed in 2013 due to the costs in damage from Hurricane Sandy.
Tornado		2008	2009	
Space Age Umbrella Ride		1966	2009	Built by Hampton Amusement Co. Relocated to Santa's Village AZoosment Park and renamed Space Invasion.
Volcano Play Center		1984	2009	
Roto Whip		1938	2009	Built by W.F. Mangels Co. Relocated to Santa's Village AZoosment Park.
Dip N Drop		2000	2009	Built by Moser's Rides
Firetrucks		1959	1990s	Two Modified 1959 Volkswagen Type 2 pickup trucks for birthday charters. Rescued by Randy Carlson and currently under refurbishment in California in 2022.
Elephant Ride		1957	2009	Originally built as an Allan Herschell Helicopter Ride, Helicopter carriages replaced with Elephant carriage bodies circa 2000.
