= Wrath of Rakshasa =

Steel roller coaster at Six Flags Great America

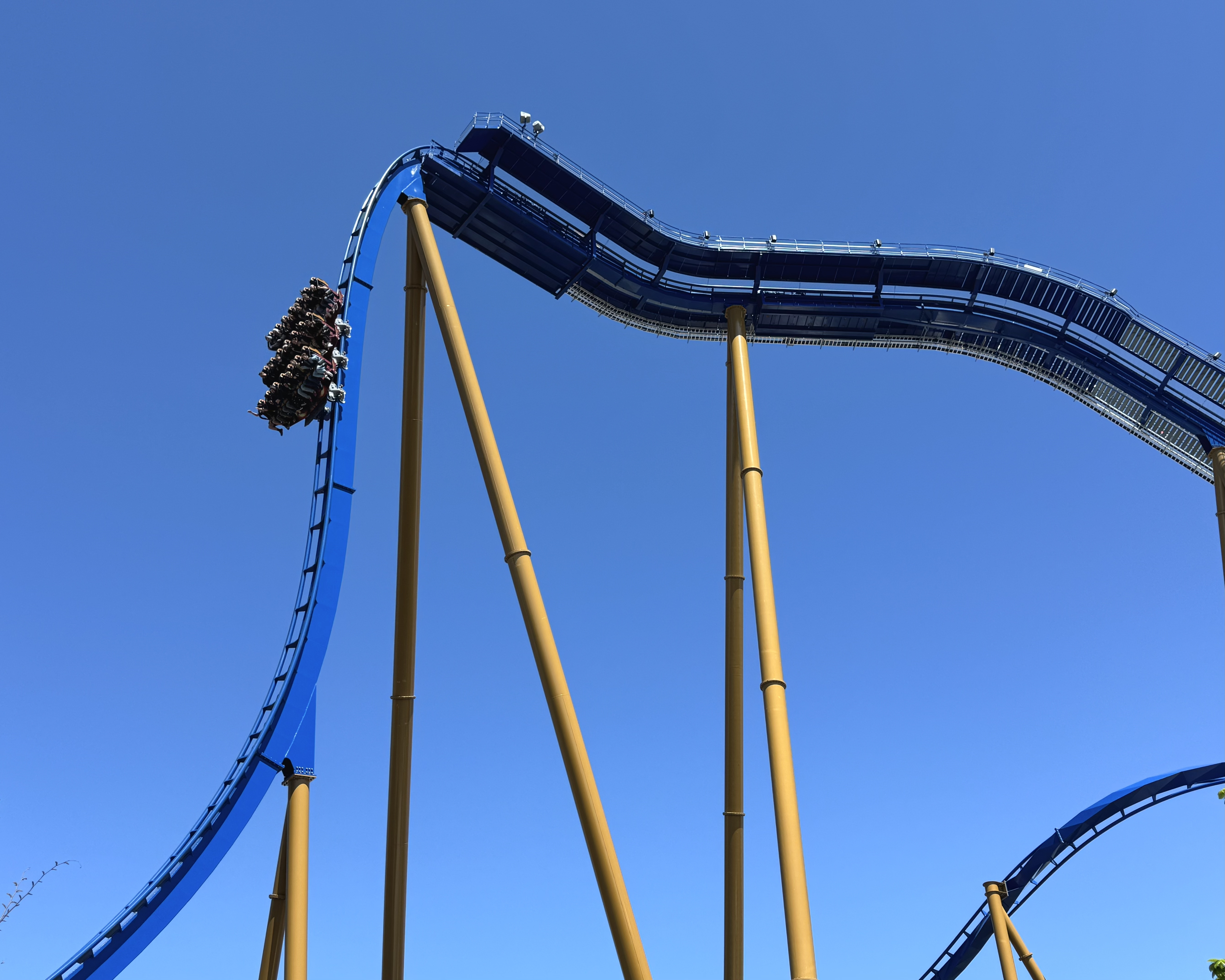
- A train on Wrath of Rakshasa descending its drop

Six Flags Great America
- Location: Six Flags Great America
- Park section: County Fair
- Coordinates: 42°22′00″N 87°56′02″W
- Status: Operating
- Soft opening date: May 30, 2025
- Opening date: May 31, 2025
- Replaced: Buccaneer Battle

General statistics
- Type: Steel – Dive
- Manufacturer: Bolliger & Mabillard
- Model: Dive Coaster
- Lift/launch system: Chain lift hill
- Height: 180 ft (55 m)
- Drop: 171 ft (52 m)
- Length: 3,239 ft (987 m)
- Speed: 67 mph (108 km/h)
- Inversions: 5
- Duration: 2:00
- Max vertical angle: 96°
- Height restriction: 48–78 in (122–198 cm)
- Trains: 3 trains with 3 cars; riders arranged 7 across in a single row for a total of 21 riders per train
- Theme: Rakshasa
- Website: www.sixflags.com/greatamerica/attractions/wrath-of-rakshasa
- Fast Lane Priority and Ultimate only available (limited-use basis)
- Wrath of Rakshasa at RCDB

Wrath of Rakshasa (pronounced /ˈrɑːkʃɑːsə/; RAHK-shah-sə) is a steel roller coaster located at Six Flags Great America in Gurnee, Illinois, United States. Manufactured by Bolliger & Mabillard (B&M), the Dive Coaster model opened to the public on May 31, 2025. The roller coaster reaches a height of 180 feet (55 m), a maximum vertical angle of 96°, a maximum speed of 67 mph (108 km/h), and features five total inversions.

Located in the County Fair section, it is themed around a traveling exhibition show featuring artifacts about the Rakshasa, a shape-shifting demon from Hindu mythology. As of 2026, it holds the records for the steepest drop on a Dive Coaster and the most inversions on a Dive Coaster. The ride placed 5th in both Amusement Today's 2025 Golden Ticket Awards for "Best New Theme Concept" and USA Today's 2026 Reader's Choice Awards for "Best New Theme Park Attraction."

== History ==
=== Planning ===
Six Flags Great America made previous plans to build a Dive Coaster model from manufacturer Bolliger & Mabillard (B&M), at the park. However, the park sought to build a more intense Dive Coaster, so their original Dive Coaster plans were sent to Six Flags Fiesta Texas in San Antonio, Texas, where it opened in 2022 and currently operates as Dr. Diabolical's Cliffhanger.

On May 28, 2024, the park's parent company, Six Flags, filed a trademark with the United States Patent and Trademark Office for the name "Wrath of Rakshasa". On July 18, 2024, the park began a teaser campaign named "#FearTheWrath", revealing cryptic clues about the park's 2025 attraction. #FearTheWrath banners were located on fences around the former Buccaneer Battle site; demolition had begun around the same time. Speculation arose that the attraction would be a new roller coaster. The park's previous roller coaster installation, Maxx Force, had opened six years earlier, marking the longest gap between roller coaster additions in the park's history.

The park announced construction on Wrath of Rakshasa on August 15, 2024. Located within the County Fair section of the park, the custom-designed B&M Dive Coaster would be built on the plot of the former Buccaneer Battle water ride. It was also revealed that the ride would feature lockers and an exit gift shop. It would be the fifth operating B&M roller coaster at the park, and the park's sixth collaboration with the manufacturer.

=== Construction and opening ===
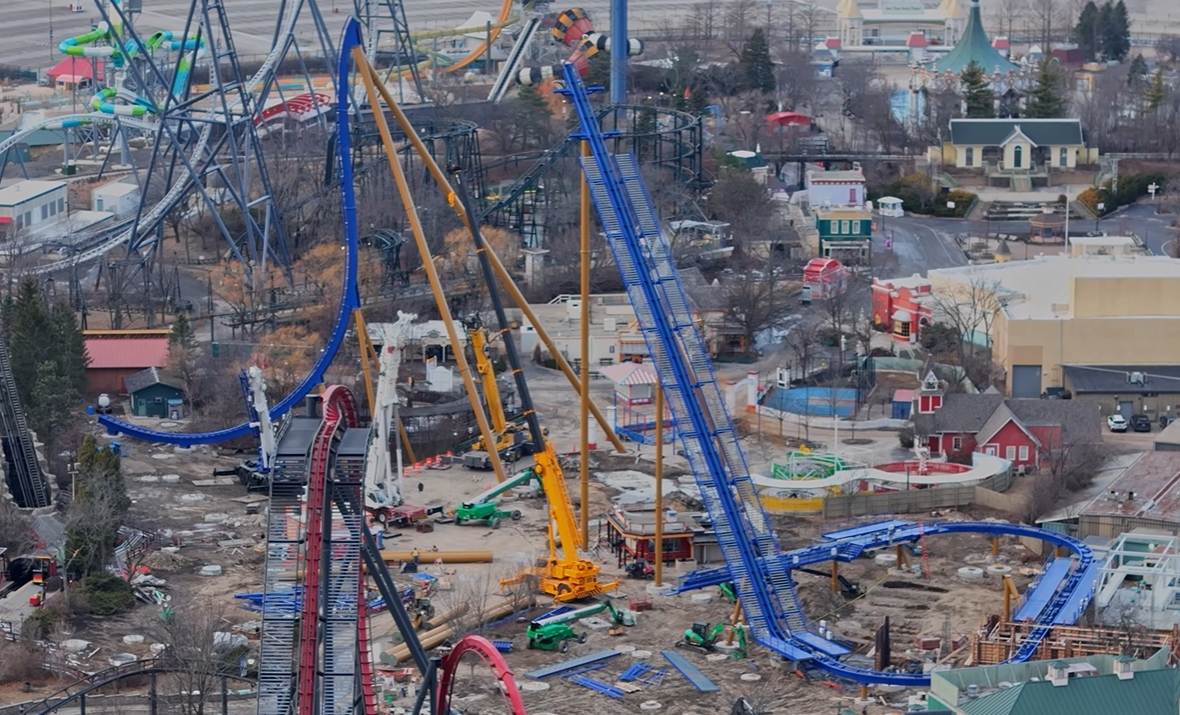
Construction on Wrath of Rakshasa in late-January 2025, prior to the lift hill being topped off.

Construction on the ride started in the fall, during the park's Halloween event Fright Fest. During this time, the pathway between the park's Hometown Square and County Fair sections was closed for the remainder of the season. Tracks for the ride started arriving at the park in mid-October 2024, with the first piece of track being installed in December. On January 21, 2025, the park provided an animated point-of-view video of the ride. The ride's 180-foot-tall (55 m) lift hill was topped off in early-February 2025. In March 2025, the last piece of track was installed.

On April 16, 2025, the park revealed that the roller coaster had completed its full test cycle, although without the holding brake. Media day to introduce the roller coaster was held on May 22, 2025, with the official opening date announced that same date, slated for May 31. The ride had a soft opening for select season pass holders on May 30, 2025, and the ride officially opened to the public a day later on May 31, 2025.

On January 17, 2026, preceding the ride's second season, it was announced that Wrath of Rakshasa would receive on-ride photos and lockers.

== Ride experience ==
=== Queue and theme ===
The queue is themed after a traveling exhibition show by the fictional Ornelas Brothers at the park's County Fair called "The Wrath of Rakshasa." With carnival-style posters to fit the park's County Fair themed area, the show presents an "unusual collection" of artifacts, informational boards, and statues related to the mythical Rakshasa, a shape-shifting demon from Hindu mythology. It thematically complements the adjacent Demon roller coaster. The ride's exit leads riders into the Rakshasa Relics store.

=== Layout ===
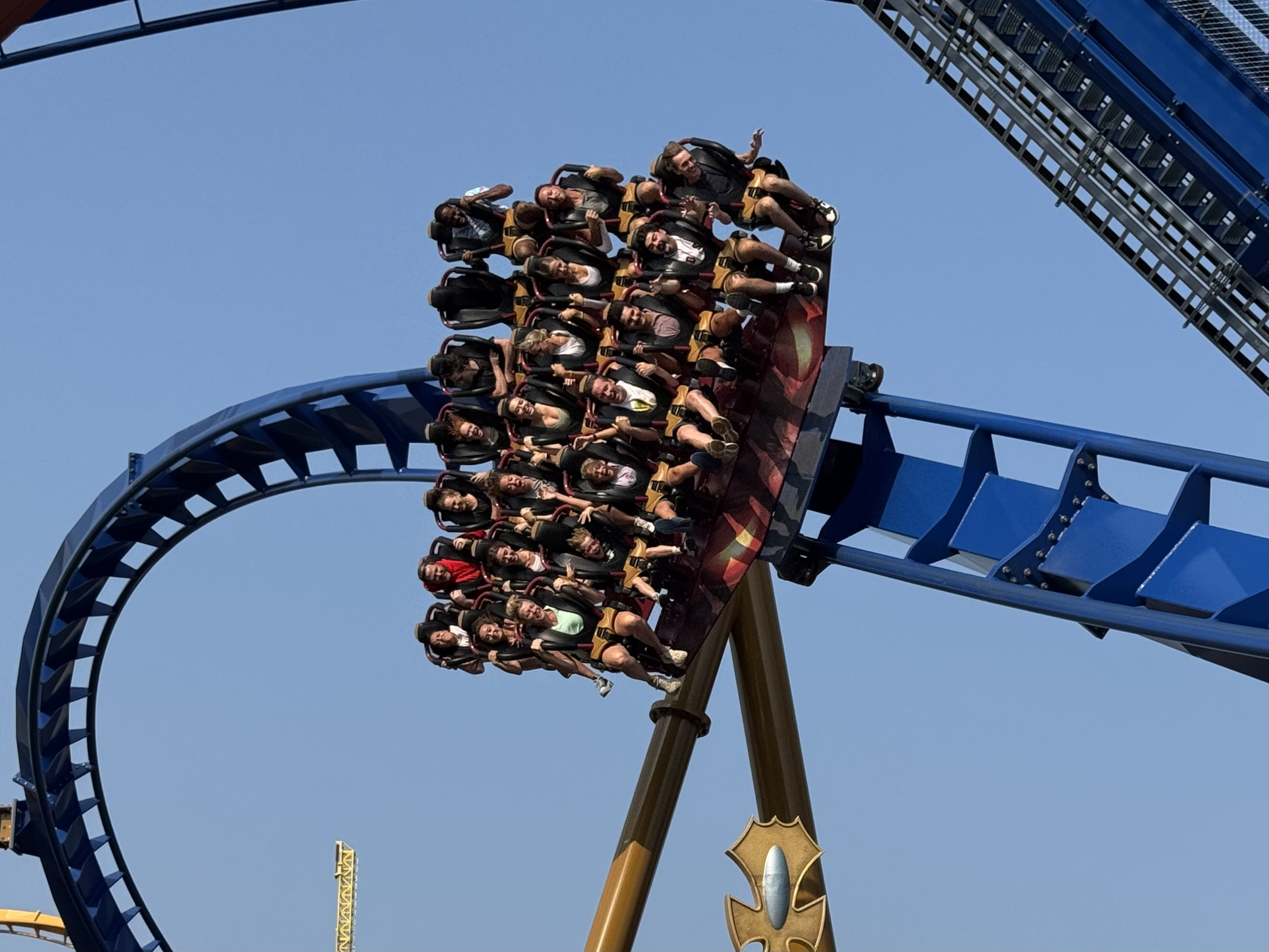
The train going through the barrel roll element.

After exiting the station, trains on Wrath of Rakshasa climb the 180-foot-tall (55 m) lift hill. At the top, riders take a small left turn and stop, while the train is tilted to peer over the edge. After a brief pause, riders plunge 171 feet (52 m) at a 96-degree beyond-vertical angle, reaching speeds up to 67 mph (108 km/h). Afterward, riders ascend into an Immelmann loop, followed by a dive loop. The train then traverses a zero-g roll, turns down and to the right into a corkscrew above a barrel roll separated by a 270-degree turn. This is followed by a 180-degree turn to the left, then a 360-degree helix into the final brake run.

== Characteristics ==
=== Track ===
An overview of Wrath of Rakshasa.

The steel box track of Wrath of Rakshasa is 3,239 feet (987 m) long and the lift is 180 feet (55 m) high, with a drop of 171 feet (52 m). The track of the roller coaster is painted blue with gold colored supports. The ride's track—specifically its inversions—are built over and interact guest pathways multiple times.

=== Train ===
Wrath of Rakshasa operates three fiberglass trains with three cars per train. Each car seats seven riders in one row, with a total of 21 riders per train. Utilizing B&M vest restraints, the train features a maroon and gold color scheme.

=== Station ===
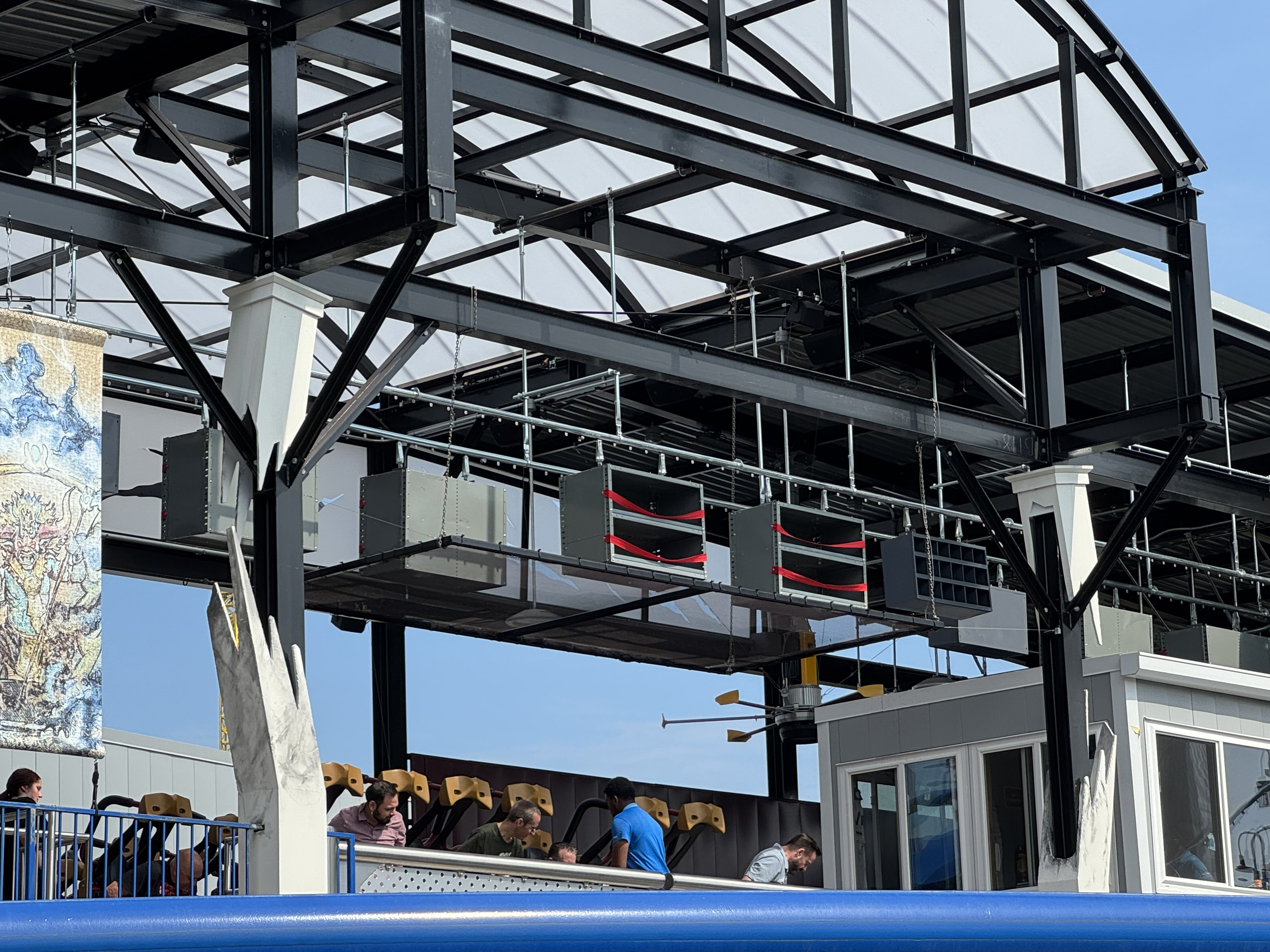
Bins on the station's conveyor belt system hanging over the track.

The station features a conveyor belt-like bin system that goes over the roller coaster's track, taking loose articles from the loading side to the unloading side. This system is based on the one used on Yukon Striker at Canada's Wonderland.

== Records ==
Upon the opening of Wrath of Rakshasa on May 31, 2025, it broke two records specific to the Dive Coaster model. It has the steepest vertical angle drop on a Dive Coaster at 96° (surpassing Dr. Diabolical's Cliffhanger at Six Flags Fiesta Texas and Iron Menace at Dorney Park & Wildwater Kingdom), and has the most inversions on a Dive Coaster with five inversions (surpassing Yukon Striker at Canada's Wonderland).

== Reception ==
Marcus Leshock of WGN-TV positively commented on the ride, stating that it was "super smooth", and noted that he considered the front row to provide the best ride experience. John Gregory of the Theme Park Tribune graded the ride at a B, stating that the ride offers "graceful" inversions similar to those found on other Dive Coasters, although he noted that there was "a bit of intensity missing". Erik Kaspersetz of Coaster101 complimented the "creative end element-packed layout" of the ride, becoming more "disorienting" through "dives and rolls", though he noticed a "consistent vibration" on the ride.

=== Awards ===
In Amusement Today's 2025 edition of the Golden Ticket Awards, Wrath of Rakshasa placed 5th in the category "Best New Theme Concept." The ride placed 5th in USA Today's "Best New Theme Park Attraction" category, a user-voted poll in the 2026 edition of its Readers' Choice Awards.
