= Little Dipper (Six Flags Great America) =

Wooden roller coaster

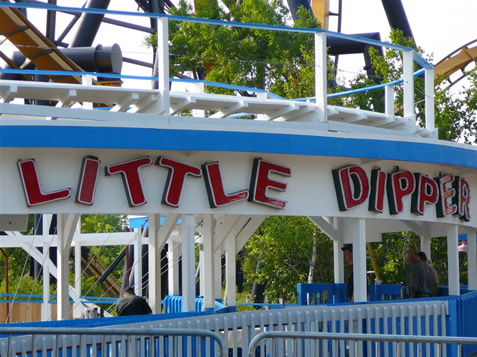

Six Flags Great America
- Park section: Yukon Territory
- Coordinates: 42.367521°N 87.933333°W
- Status: Operating
- Opening date: May 27, 2010

Kiddieland Amusement Park
- Coordinates: 41.909620°N 87.836600°W
- Status: Removed
- Opening date: 1950
- Closing date: September 27, 2009

General statistics
- Type: Wood
- Manufacturer: Philadelphia Toboggan Coasters
- Designer: Herbert Schmeck
- Model: Junior Coaster
- Lift/launch system: Chain lift hill
- Height: 28 ft (8.5 m)
- Drop: 24 ft (7.3 m)
- Length: 700 ft (210 m)
- Speed: 25 mph (40 km/h)
- Inversions: 0
- Duration: 0:50
- Restraint style: lap bar
- Height restriction: 36 in (91 cm)
- Trains: Single train with 4 cars. Riders are arranged 2 across in 2 rows for a total of 16 riders per train.
- Must transfer from wheelchair
- Little Dipper at RCDB

Little Dipper is a wooden roller coaster located at Six Flags Great America in Gurnee, Illinois. It was built in 1950 at Kiddieland Amusement Park in Melrose Park, Illinois. When the park closed in 2009, Six Flags Great America purchased the ride at an auction. The ride was relocated and reopened on May 27, 2010.

== History ==
In 1950, Little Dipper was built at Kiddieland Amusement Park in Melrose Park, Illinois. The roller coaster was designed by Herbert Schmeck and built by Philadelphia Toboggan Coasters at a cost of $20,000 ($267,635 in 2025). The ride consisted of a compact figure-eight layout featuring small hills, dips, and turns. Little Dipper cost nine cents per ride, and stood as the sole roller coaster at Kiddieland until the park's closure.

In 2009, Kiddieland closed due to a dispute with the owners of the land. On November 24, 2009, Kiddieland's rides were auctioned off. Six Flags Great America purchased Little Dipper for $33,000, promising to preserve its history. The coaster was relocated to Six Flags Great America in the Yukon Territory section of the park. Some of its wood was replaced and it was repainted before reopening on May 27, 2010.
