= The Joker (S&S Worldwide) =

Roller coasters at four Six Flags parks

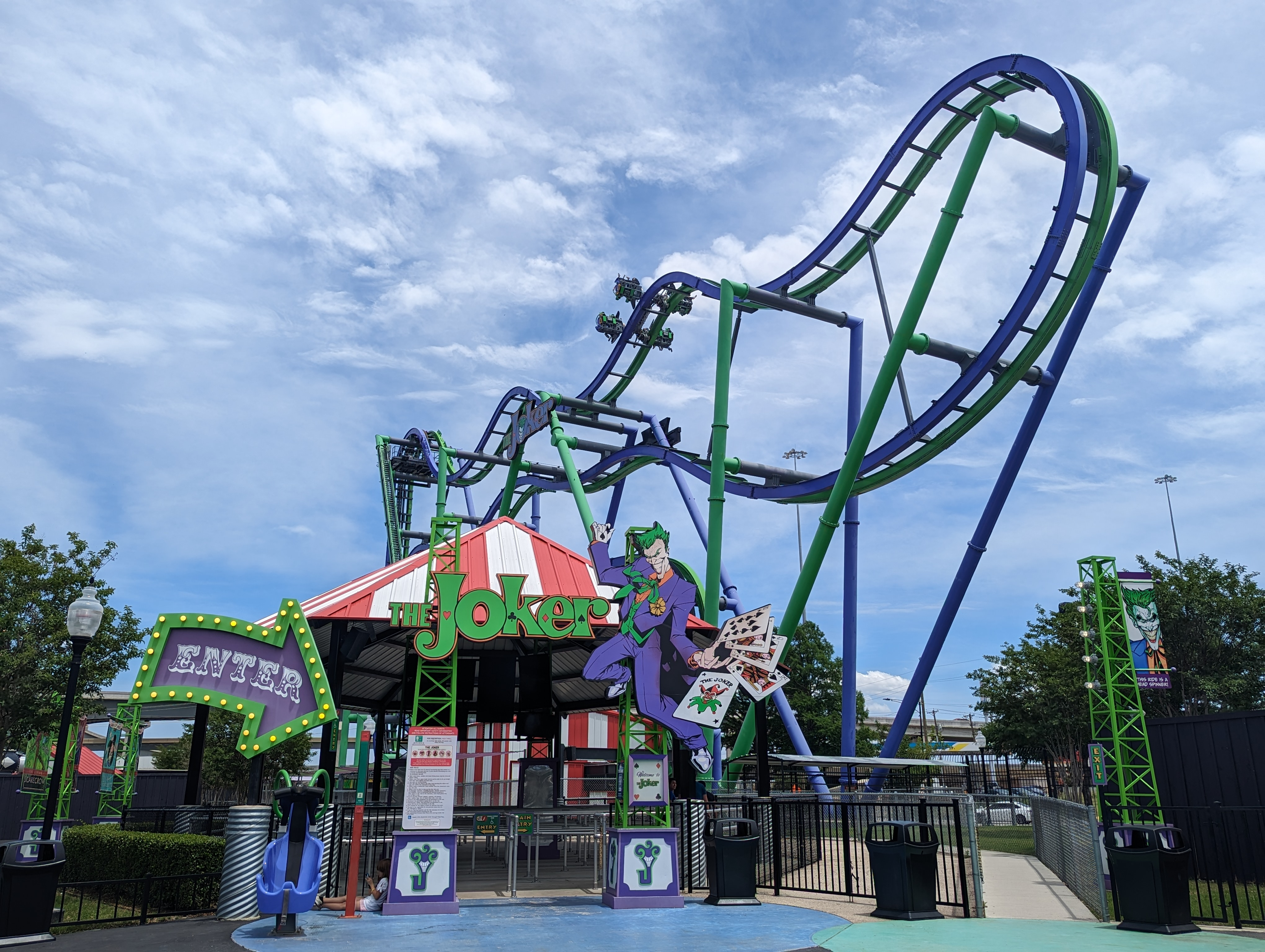
- The Joker at Six Flags Over Texas.

General statistics
- Type: Steel – 4th Dimension – Wing Coaster
- Manufacturer: S&S – Sansei Technologies
- Designer: Alan Schilke
- Model: 4D Free Spin
- Lift/launch system: Chain lift hill
- Height: 120 ft (37 m)
- Drop: 54 ft (16 m)
- Length: 1,019 ft (311 m)
- Speed: 38 mph (61 km/h)
- Inversions: 6 (2 track inversions)
- Capacity: 720 riders per hour
- Height restriction: 48 in (122 cm)
- Trains: 5 trains with a single car; riders arranged 4 across in 2 rows for a total of 8 riders per train
- Fast Lane available
- Single rider line available

The Joker is a 4D Free Spin roller coaster at four Six Flags amusement parks in the United States. Since 2016, Six Flags has installed The Joker at Six Flags Great Adventure, Six Flags Great America, Six Flags Over Texas and Six Flags New England. Built by S&S – Sansei Technologieseach of these steel roller coasters coasters are versions of their "Free Spin" model.

Riders zig zag along the track while flipping head over heels up to six times throughout the ride in a somewhat uncontrolled manner. Six Flags started installing more after the success of Batman: The Ride that opened in 2015 at Six Flags Fiesta Texas.

== History ==
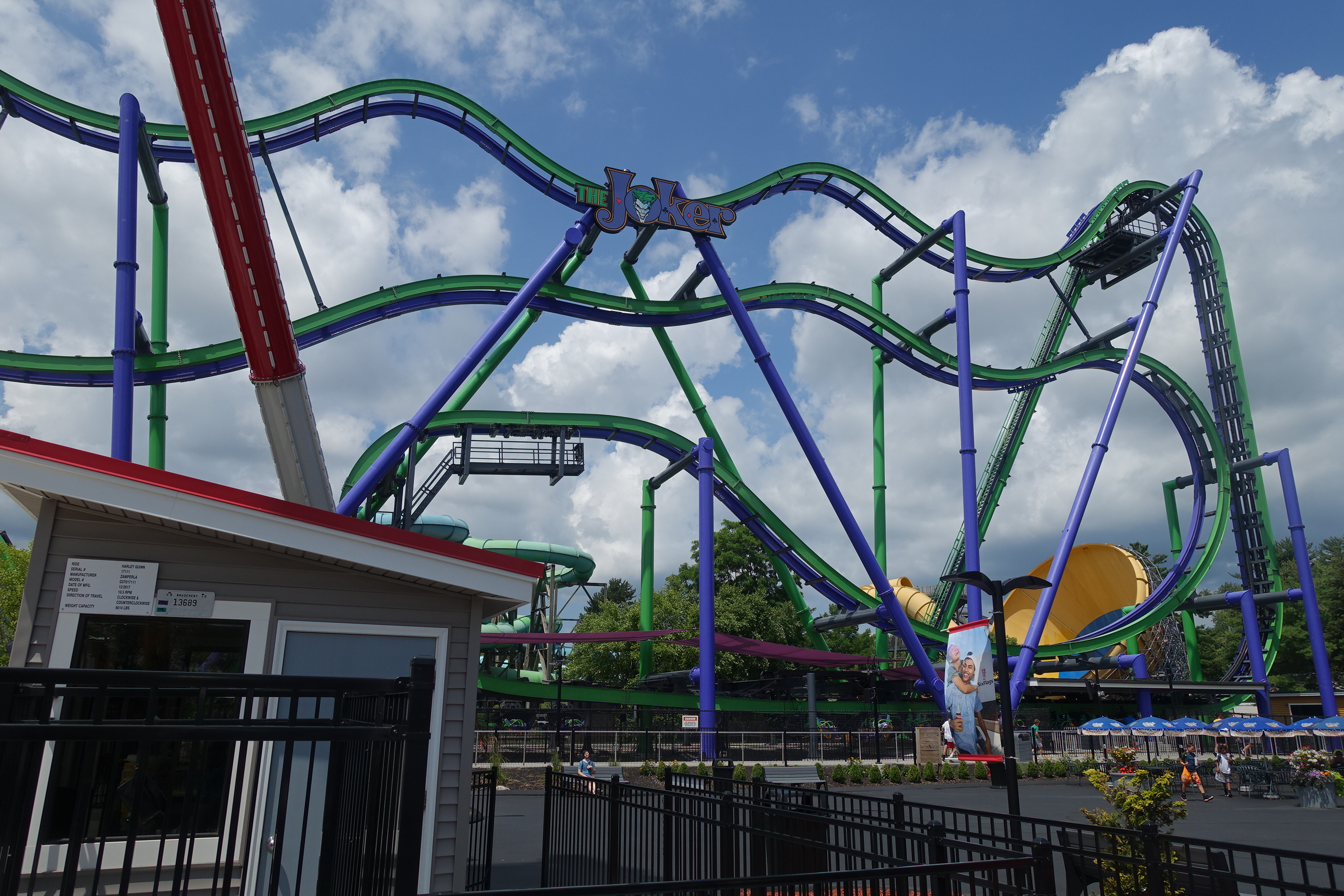
The Joker at Six Flags New England.

When originally announced on September 3, 2015, The Joker at Great Adventure was given the name Total Mayhem. On January 27, 2016, Six Flags Great Adventure renamed the coaster after the DC Comics villain Joker. The new title on the coaster brings the total number of DC Comics themed coasters in the park to seven, the most of any Six Flags park.

On September 1, 2016, Six Flags announced that Six Flags Great America, Six Flags New England and Six Flags Over Texas would install the roller coaster into their parks for the 2017 season.

The night before opening the roller coaster on May 20, 2017, Over Texas hosted an all-night private event which had The Joker opened only to the event attendees. A storm that was producing strong winds came into the area, which triggered the ride to halt while in operation while eight passengers were on board. During the stoppage, the storm got more severe, preventing the ride from being fixed, so the park called emergency services to rescue the passengers that were on the ride. The rescue operation took over three hours, bringing each passenger down individually the 120-foot-tall roller coaster while the storm was overhead. None of the riders were injured, and the park suspended the roller coaster operations on the following day for safety inspections. The Joker reopened a day later on May 21.

== Ride ==
Riders on The Joker begin by climbing along a 120-foot vertical rise. Then zoom over hills while pivoting forward multiple times, before plummeting into a steep raven drop. Next, riders subsequently change directions and go through a backwards flip, spinning backwards into another raven drop and then ending with a forward flip. The roller coaster uses an adjustable series of magnetic kickers to allow the cars to spin freely, based on factors such as gravity and rider weight in the cars. The park can adjust the degree of spin based on rider input, which will help them regulate the experience to average rider tolerance over time.

All four coasters were designed by S&S, while the track was manufactured by Rocky Mountain Construction.

As the name suggests, The Joker roller coasters are themed to the DC Comics supervillain, Joker.

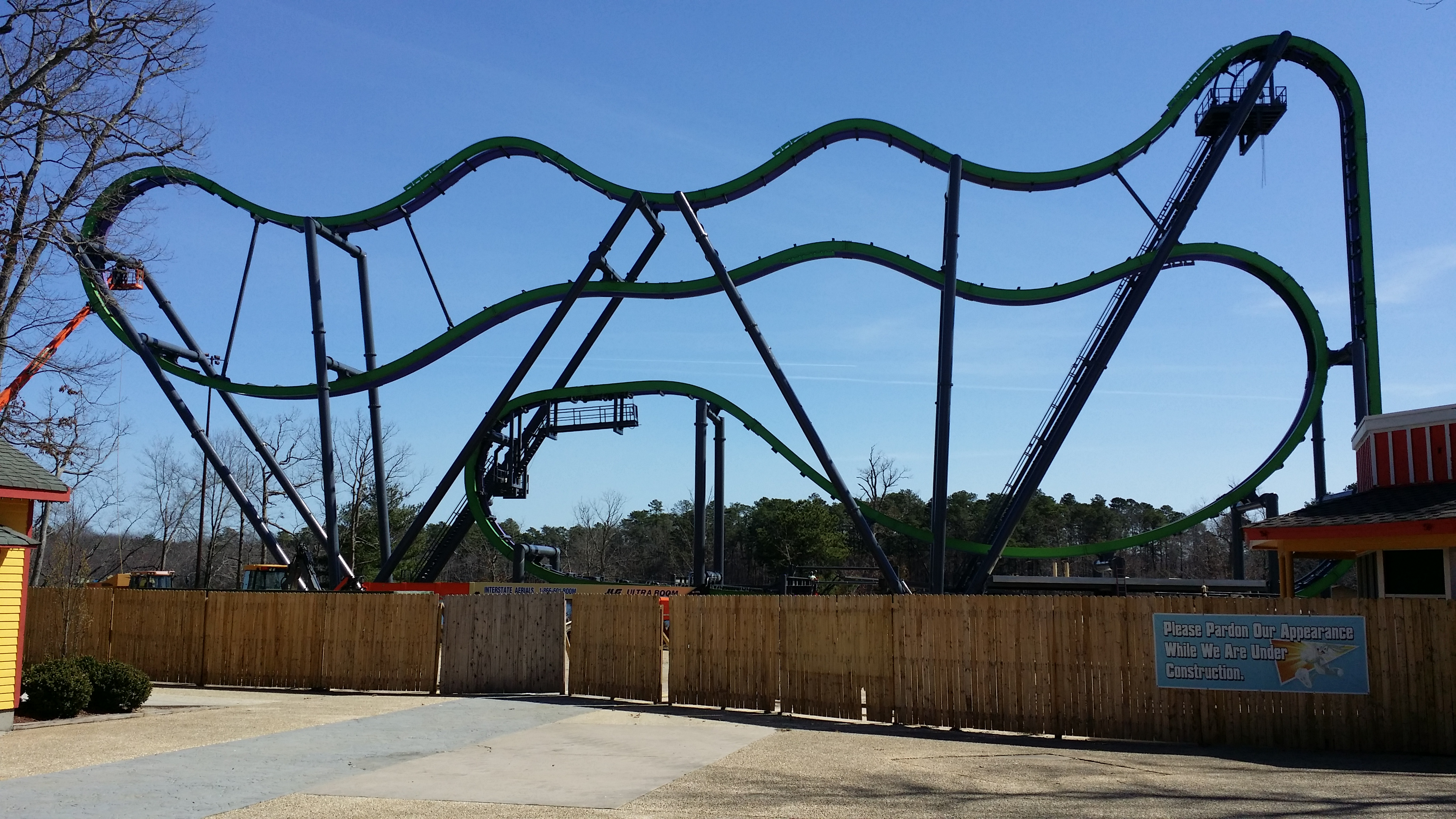
The Joker at Six Flags Great Adventure.

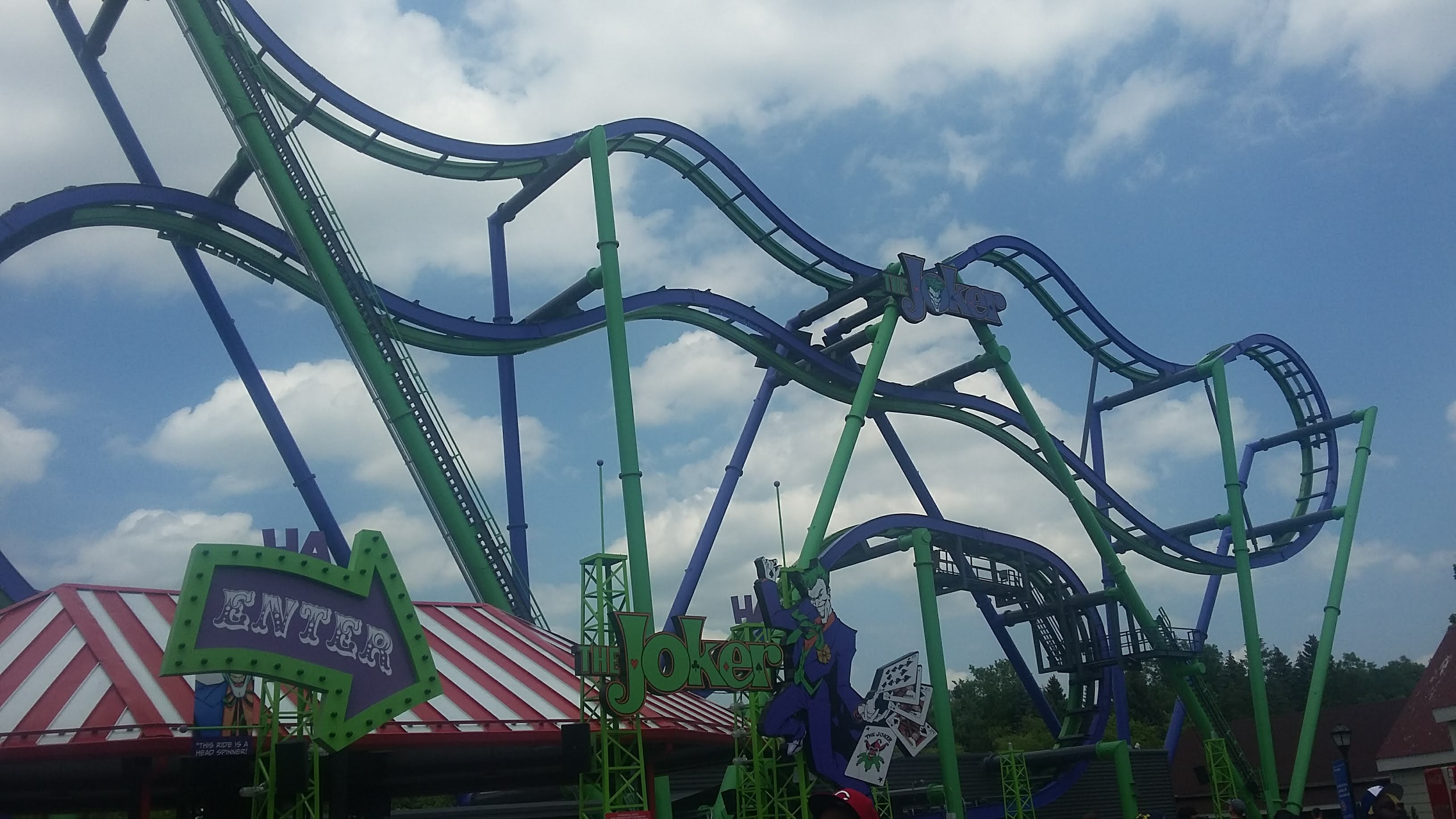
The Joker at Six Flags Great America.

At Six Flags Great Adventure, the supports are all black. At Six Flags Great America, Six Flags New England and Six Flags Over Texas, they have purple and green supports parallel to each other. At Six Flags Great America and Six Flags Over Texas, those coasters have 2 Joker signs facing back of each other, while the ones at Six Flags Great Adventure and Six Flags New England have only one Joker sign.

== Installations ==
Park	Area	Opening date
Six Flags Great Adventure	Lakefront	May 28, 2016
Six Flags Over Texas	Gotham City	May 20, 2017
Six Flags New England	Gotham City	May 27, 2017
Six Flags Great America	DC Universe (Note: Originally Yankee Harbor until the 2022 season.)	May 27, 2017
