= Rocky Point State Park =

State park in Kent County, Rhode Island

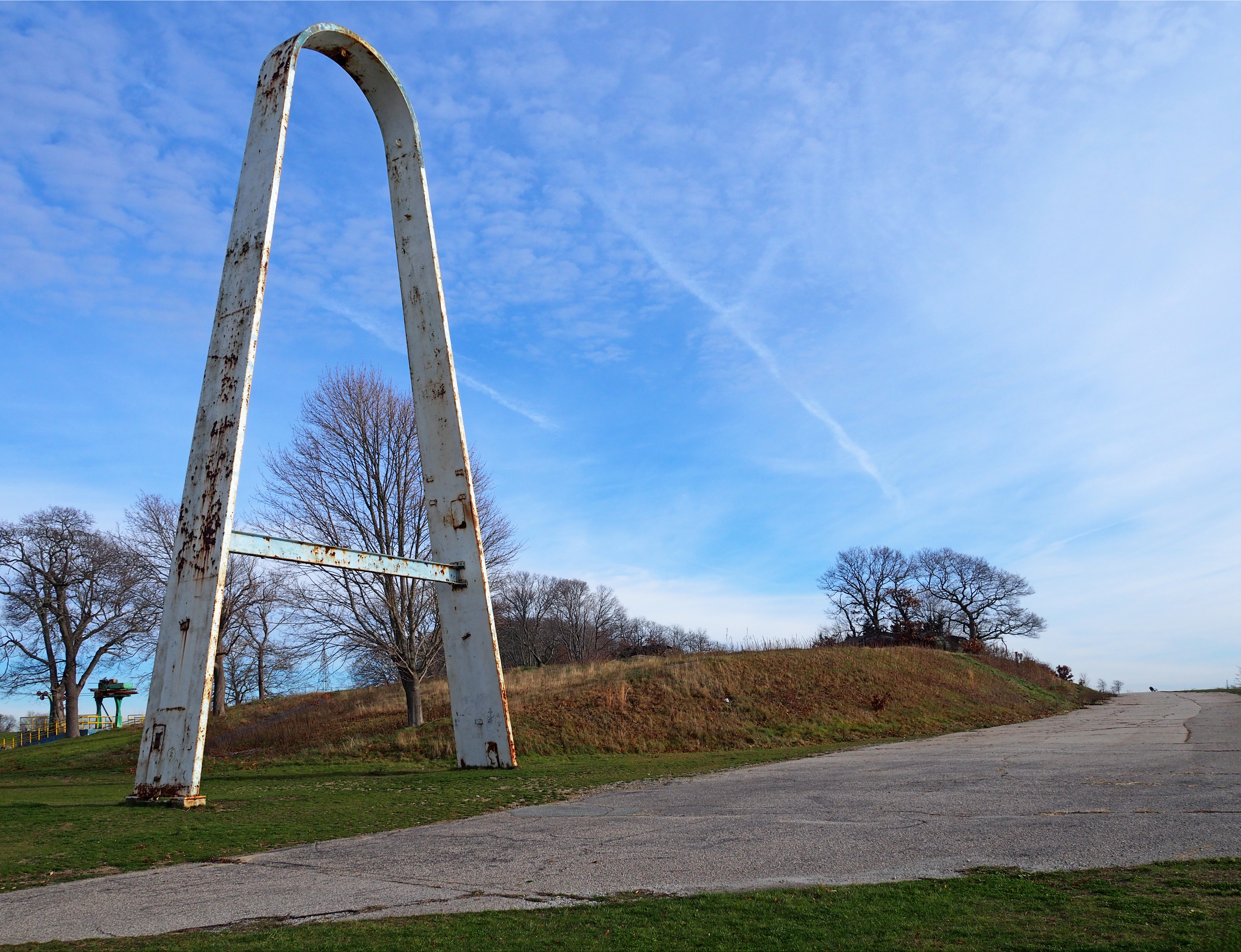
- The large arch is one of the few artifacts which remain of the former amusement park.

- Location within Rhode Island
- Interactive map of Rocky Point State Park
- Location: Warwick, Rhode Island, United States
- Coordinates: 41°41′29″N 71°21′48″W
- Area: 120 acres (49 ha)
- Elevation: 16 ft (4.9 m)
- Established: 2014
- Administrator: Rhode Island Department of Environmental Management, Division of Parks & Recreation
- Website: Official website
- Rhode Island State Parks

Rocky Point State Park is a passive use state park on Narragansett Bay in Warwick, Rhode Island. The land has been a public attraction since the mid-1800s, most notably as Rocky Point Amusement Park. The amusement park closed in 1995 and sat abandoned for years until the city and state purchased the land in stages between 2008 and 2013. It reopened to the public as a state park in October 2014.

== History ==
Rocky Point has been a public attraction since the mid-1800s, located 10 miles from the state capital on a coastal point in Warwick, Rhode Island. William Winslow first began serving dinner and offering amusements when he purchased the land in 1847. By the middle of the 20th century, it was a very popular amusement park offering dozens of rides, including roller coasters, a log flume, Skyliner, Freefall, ferris wheel, and carousel. It was also home to the Shore Dinner Hall, a 4,000-seat food hall just outside the amusement park gates serving clamcakes, steamers, lobster, and New England clam chowder.

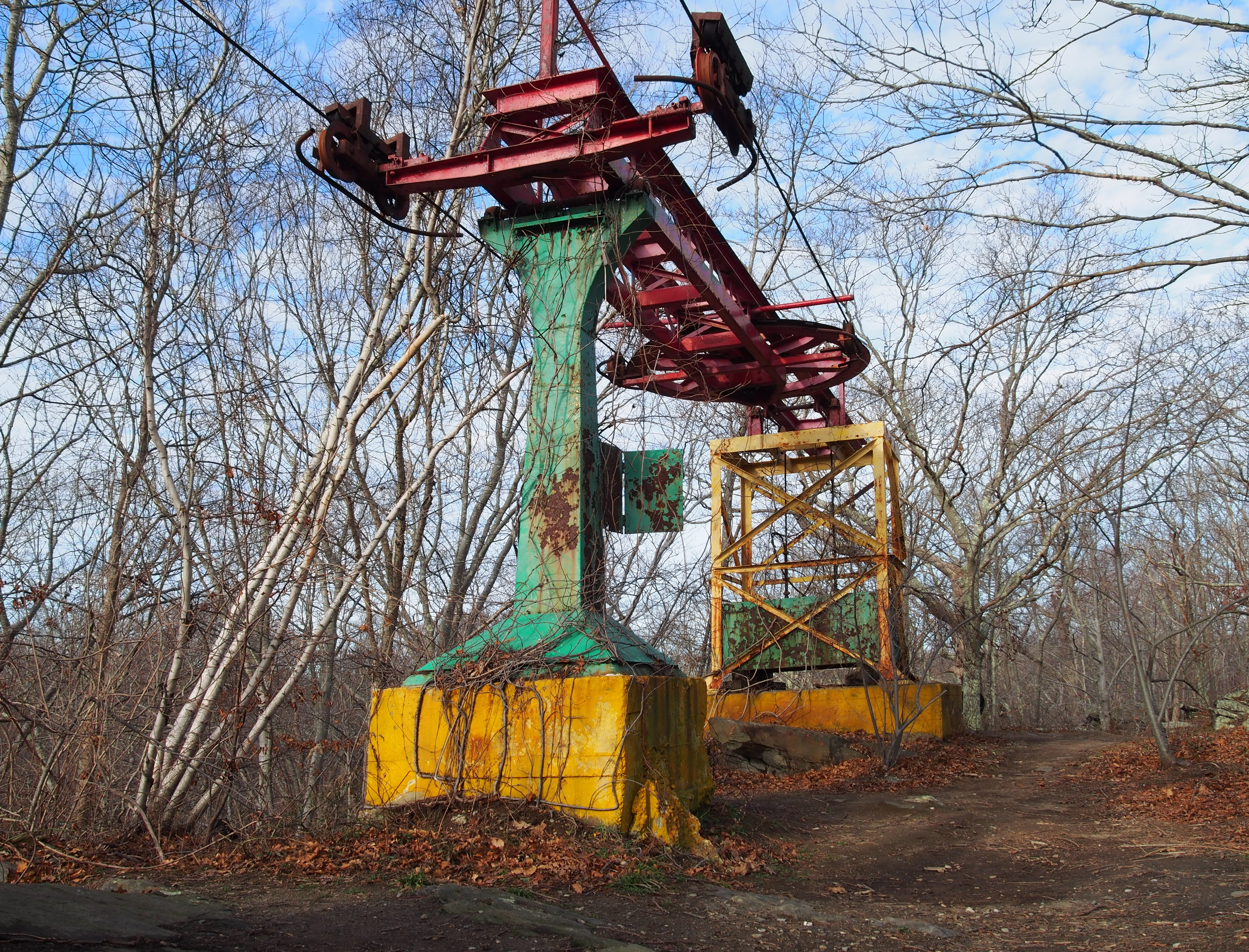
Remains of the Skyliner ride's upper turnaround in December 2015.

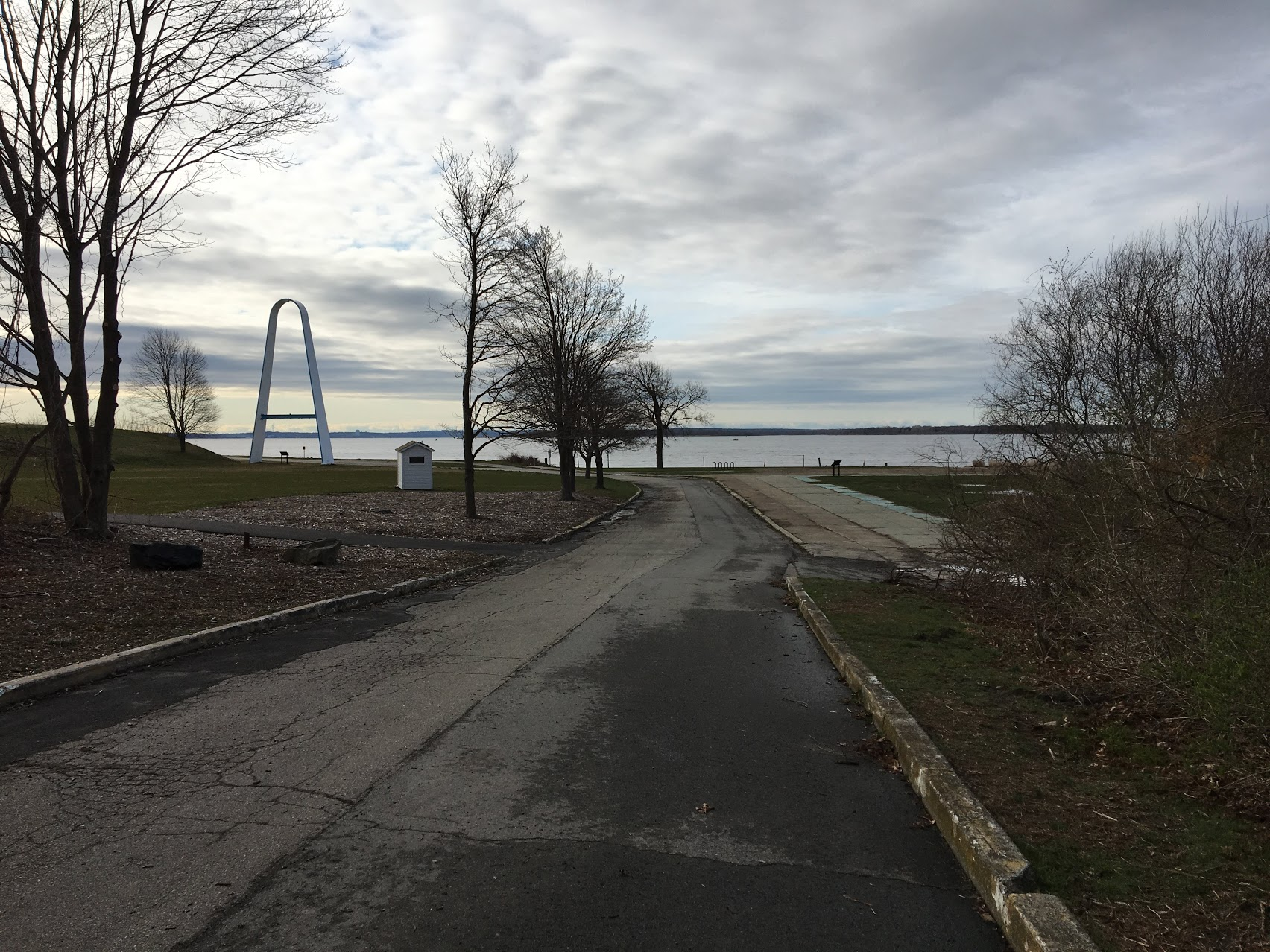
View of the park, with the Arch on the left and Olympic swimming pool on right

The park was owned by private interests throughout its history. Initially, steamboat captain William Winslow brought passengers there to dine or to use as a park. It was purchased from him in 1865 by Byron Sprague, and sold again in 1869 to the Continental Steamboat Company which brought Randall A. Harrington on to manage it. Harrington built up the popular space into a premier resort. Following a destructive fire in 1883, its character shifted to emphasizing rides, performances, sports, and other attractions. The park changed hands a few times but maintained its popularity throughout the 20th century. In the 1990s, its parent company struggled financially, and the park closed in November 1994. Many of the rides and attractions were sold, but much of the park sat abandoned for years, a popular site for vandals and urban explorers. It became a safety concern after multiple fires, eroding structures, and pervasive vandalism, and demolition of its remains began in May 2007.

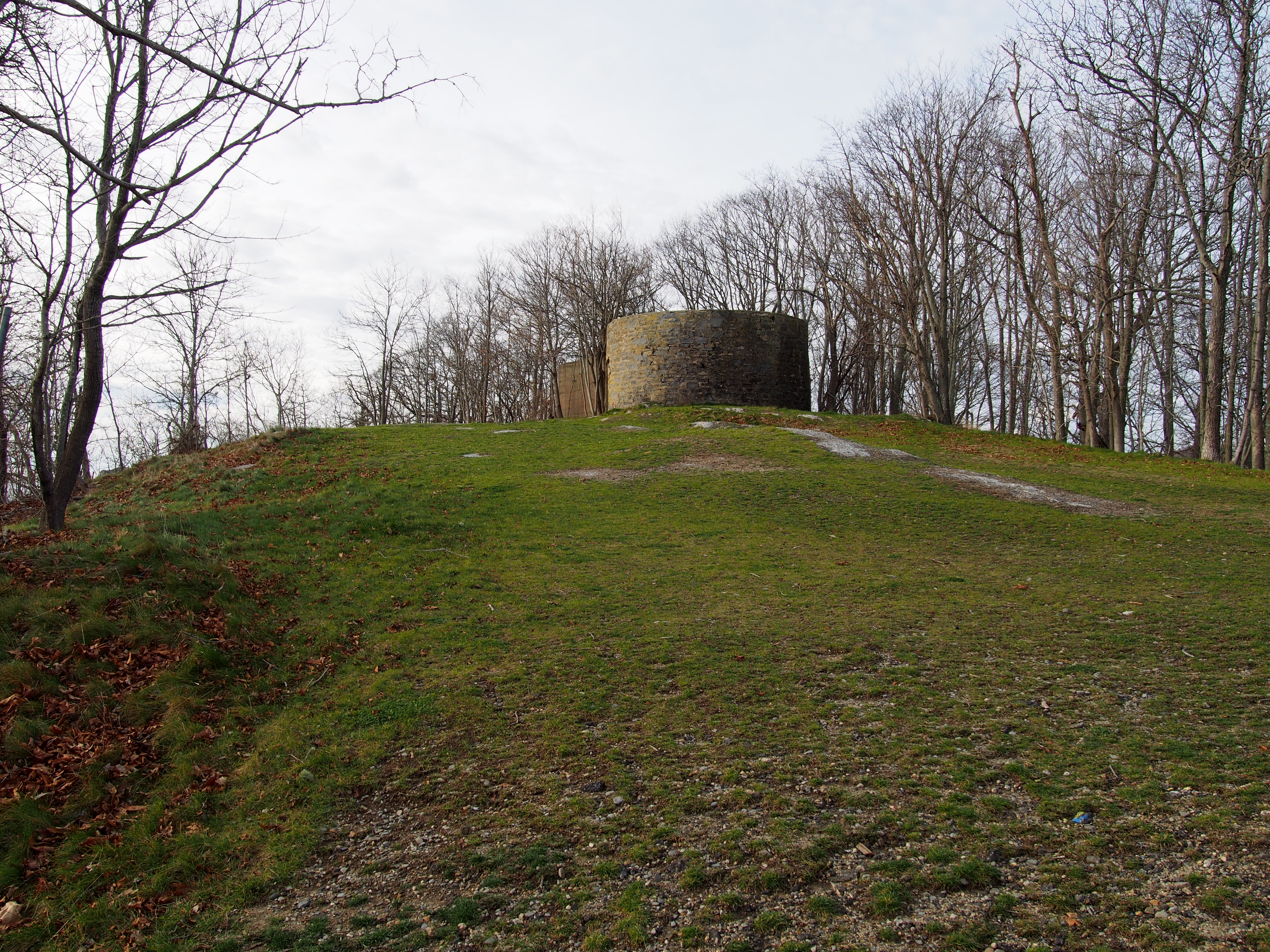
Ruins of an old water tank remain on a hill in the east part of the park.

== Acquisition for public use ==
The City of Warwick purchased 41 acres with state and federal funding in 2007, taking the title in August 2008. Rocky Point reopened to the public in June 2011, with a freshly paved walking path along the shore. Warwick mayor Scott Avedisian remarked that it was the first time in 80 years that an acre of shoreline was opened in the city for public use.

Rhode Island introduced a ballot measure in 2010 to purchase the remaining 83 acres around the site, combining it with the 41 already owned in order to establish it as a state park. The measure passed by nearly 2:1. The purchase was approved by the Small Business Administration in September 2012, and the last portion of land was transferred to the state in March 2013.

The remaining buildings were demolished in summer 2014, including the Shore Dinner Hall. The space was then cleaned and developed, and it reopened as a state park on October 25, 2014.

== Description ==
Rocky Point is a passive use area, with most of the former amusement park now open space. A few structures remain from the amusement park, including the 1906 Circle Swing ride tower, the upper and lower stations and support towers from the Skyliner gondola ride, ruins of an old water tank, and a large arch by the entrance. The arch was one of 11 “Peace Through Understanding” arches at the 1964 World's Fair in Flushing, Queens, New York; it was moved to Rocky Point in 1966 and underwent restoration in 2016. In the summer, the park screens movies on its lawn and hosts a 5K run. In 2017 and 2018, the state park hosted Food Truck Nights. A large public fishing pier was opened in July 2020, which is the only deep-water fishing pier in the bay.
