= Diabolik Invertigo =

Boomerang roller coaster at Movieland Park

Diabolik
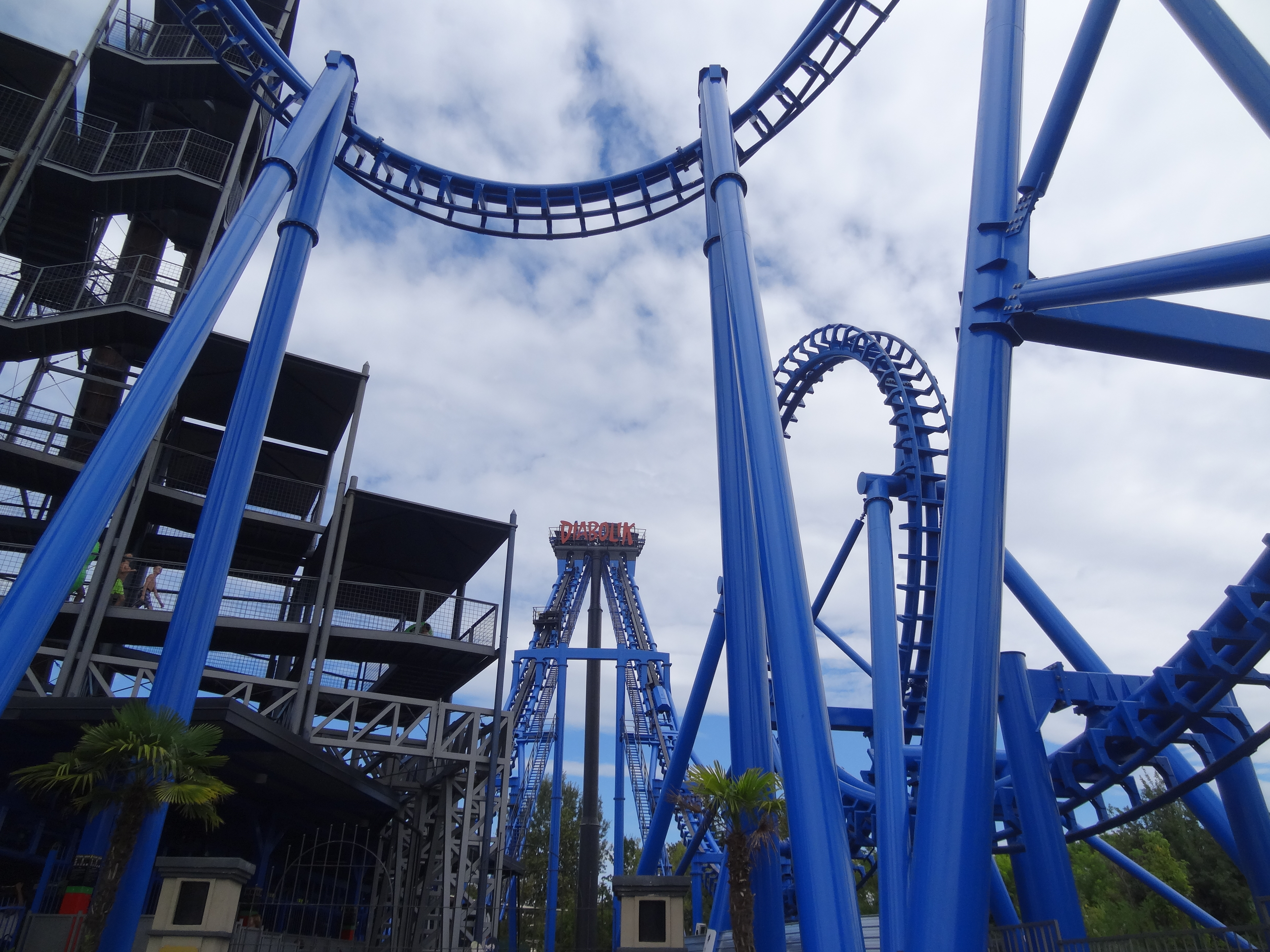
- A view of the ride layout

Movieland Park
- Coordinates: 45.477074°N 10.726034°E
- Status: Operating
- Opening date: April 24, 2015

Six Flags America
- Name: Two Face: The Flip Side
- Status: Closed
- Opening date: May 8, 1998
- Closing date: 2007

General statistics
- Manufacturer: Vekoma
- Designer: Peter Clerx
- Model: Invertigo
- Height: 40 m (130 ft)
- Length: 309 m (1,014 ft)
- Speed: 80.5 km/h (50.0 mph)
- Site area: 2,580 m^{2} (27,800 sq ft)
- Inversions: 3
- Duration: 1:30
- Max vertical angle: 45°
- G-force: 5
- Trains: Single train with 7 cars; riders arranged 2 across in 2 rows for a total of 28 riders per train
- Theme: Diabolik

Diabolik is a Vekoma Invertigo model currently operating at Movieland Park in Italy. It originally operated as Two Face: The Flip Side at Six Flags America in Bowie, Maryland.

== History ==
In 1997, HangOver opened at Liseberg in Gothenburg, Sweden. It was the first example of an Invertigo model built. An Invertigo is a variation on a standard Boomerang, except the Invertigo uses an inverted train similar to that of a Suspended Looping Coaster instead of a traditional sit-down train. The Invertigo's train also possesses seating unlike any other roller coaster; the riders sit back-to-back and face riders from adjacent rows. In 1998, the second Invertigo opened at California's Great America as Invertigo, followed by two Invertigos opening at Kings Island (as Face/Off) and Six Flags America in 1999 (as Two Face: The Flip Side). Two Face: The Flip Side opened as one of two coasters (the other being The Joker's Jinx) for the 1999 season along with the park being renamed to Six Flags America following Premier Parks' acquisition of Six Flags. It was the first and only Six Flags ride to be themed to the DC villain Two-Face, along with being the only Invertigo to operate in a Six Flags park. The ride replaced the park's Launched Loop, Python, and was part of the park's Southwest Territory area. The ride operated until 2007, when an accident forced the ride to shut down. The ride sat dormant for the 2008 season until it was taken apart and put up for sale. It was eventually sold to Movieland Park, where it reopened as Diabolik for the 2015 season on May 24.

=== Incidents ===
In 2003, the train was stopped on the lift hill for two hours due to an electrical fault.

On October 16, 2007, a major incident occurred that closed the ride. While ascending the first lift hill, the ride stopped unexpectedly. When ride attendants attempted to recover riders, the train rolled back into the station, severing a hydraulic line in the process. The hot fluid sprayed onto 12 riders, requiring two people to go to the hospital and ten victims to be treated for back and neck injuries. After the incident, the ride remained closed pending the park being able to prove the ride was safe.

== Ride experience ==
The ride is featured in an area of its own, with guests having to cross a bridge over the Pangea attraction in order to access the queue. Around the attraction itself, there are a few comic strip-esque signs around the attraction, showing the ride story. The queue itself is very lightly themed. After enough riders enter the station, the ride attendants will begin checking restraints before dispatching the ride. Riders ascend the first lift, then are held until the lift disengages. After disengaging the lift mechanism, riders drop down the lift hill then fly through the station and enter a cobra roll. Immediately after, riders enter a vertical loop before engaging the second lift halfway up the incline. Riders climb up to the top and are released with no warning, traversing the course in the opposite direction. After passing through the station a second time and engaging the lift again, the train is lowered back to the station and riders unload.
