= Rocky Point Amusement Park =

Former amusement park in Warwick, Rhode Island

Rocky Point Park
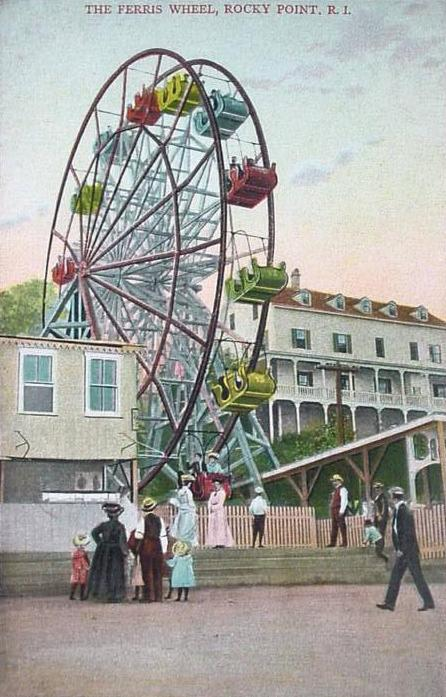
- Interactive map of Rocky Point Park
- Location: Warwick, Rhode Island, United States
- Coordinates: 41°41′21″N 71°22′3″W
- Status: Defunct
- Opened: 1847
- Closed: 1995
- Slogan: We've Got Your Summer at Rocky Point
- Operating season: Memorial Day Weekend thru mid-September

Attractions
- Total: 24+
- Roller coasters: 2+
- Water rides: 1

Rocky Point Park was an amusement park on the Narragansett Bay shore of Warwick, Rhode Island, United States. It operated from the late 1840s until it closed in 1995. In 1996, the park officially filed for bankruptcy.

== History ==
Captain William Winslow conceived the idea for a family entertainment park in the 1840s. He had purchased land and began to offer amusements and serve dinner by 1847.

In July 1936, the salt-water swimming pool at the park hosted tryouts for the 1936 Summer Olympics.

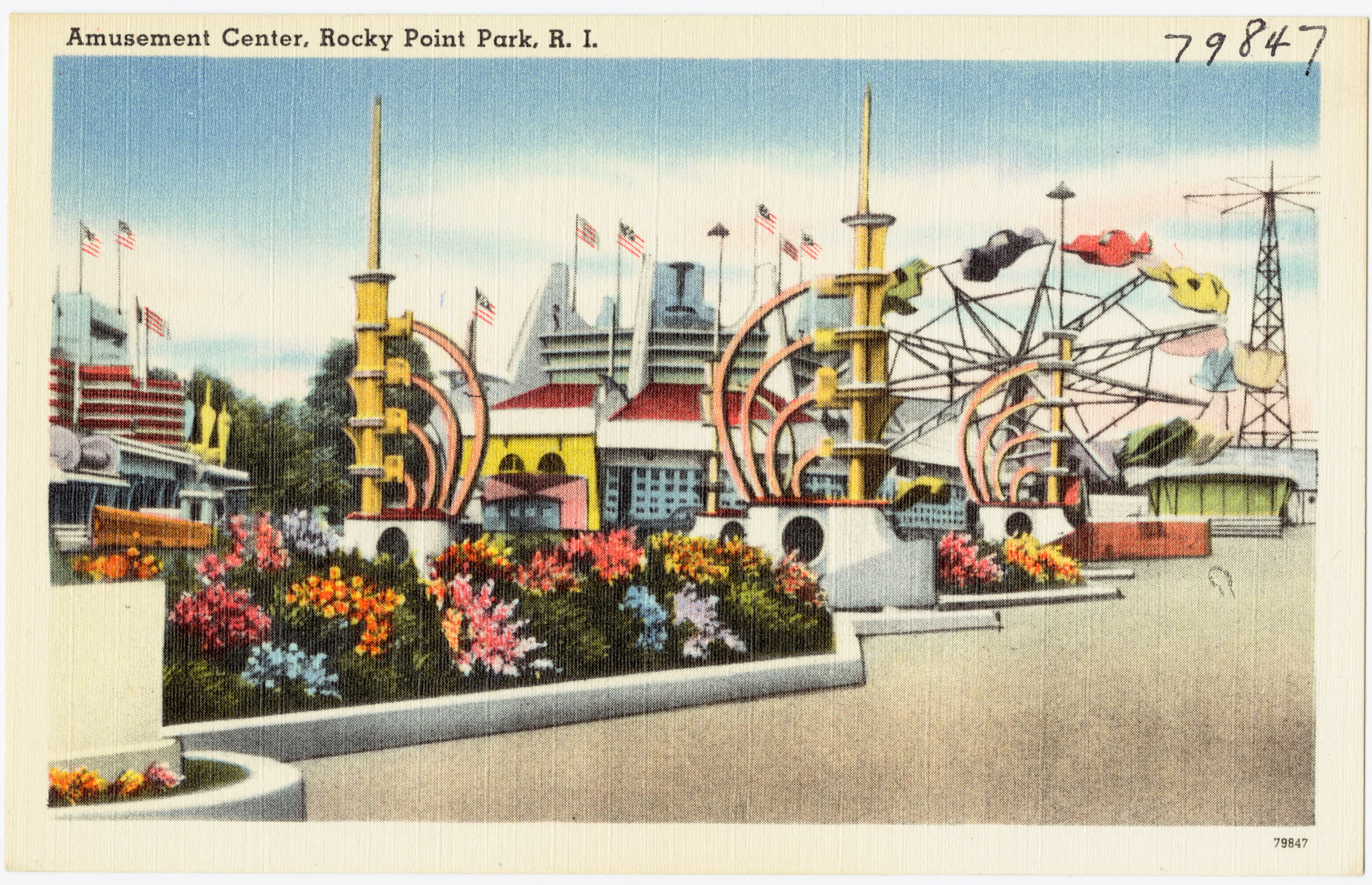
1940s postcard

Rocky Point Park was one of the most popular attractions in Rhode Island from the 1950s through the mid-1990s. It featured rides such as the Skyliner, Corkscrew Loop Roller Coaster, Log Flume, and the Freefall, which fell 13 stories at 55 mph (89 km/h). It also featured the Shore Dinner Hall, known for its clam cakes, steamers, lobsters, and Rhode Island style clam chowder. It seated more than 4,000 patrons at a time.

Rocky Point also occasionally hosted concerts in its Palladium Ballroom. Musical artists who performed at the venue included:

- The Yardbirds (1967)
- Big Brother and the Holding Company with Janis Joplin (1968)
- Sly & The Family Stone (1969)
- REO Speedwagon
- AC/DC and Thin Lizzy (1978)
- The Fixx (1983)
- Blue Öyster Cult (1984)
- Samantha Fox (1989)
- Jane's Addiction (1991)
- Pat Benatar (1991)
- Ramones (1991)
- Red Hot Chili Peppers and Pearl Jam (1991)
- Pixies (1991)
- Siouxsie and the Banshees (1992)
- Public Image Limited (1992)
- Sonic Youth (1992)
- "Weird Al" Yankovic (1992)
- Dream Theater (1993)
- Peter Frampton (1994)
- Lush and Weezer (1994)
- Scorpions (1994)
- Roomful of Blues (the venue's final concert, 1994).

== Final years ==
Rocky Point's financial situation became shaky in the early 1990s. The company that owned the park began to lose money in its attempts to leverage Rocky Point Park to fund other ventures. Rocky Point closed in 1995, then reopened briefly in 1996 as a farewell to patrons. Rides were sold in an auction, such as the Flume and Corkscrew, and are now in use at other amusement parks. The Corkscrew was sold for $850,000 to Wild Waves Theme Park in Federal Way, Washington in 1997, where it was renamed the Wild Thing and remains in operation as of 2015.

== Post-business era, vandalism ==
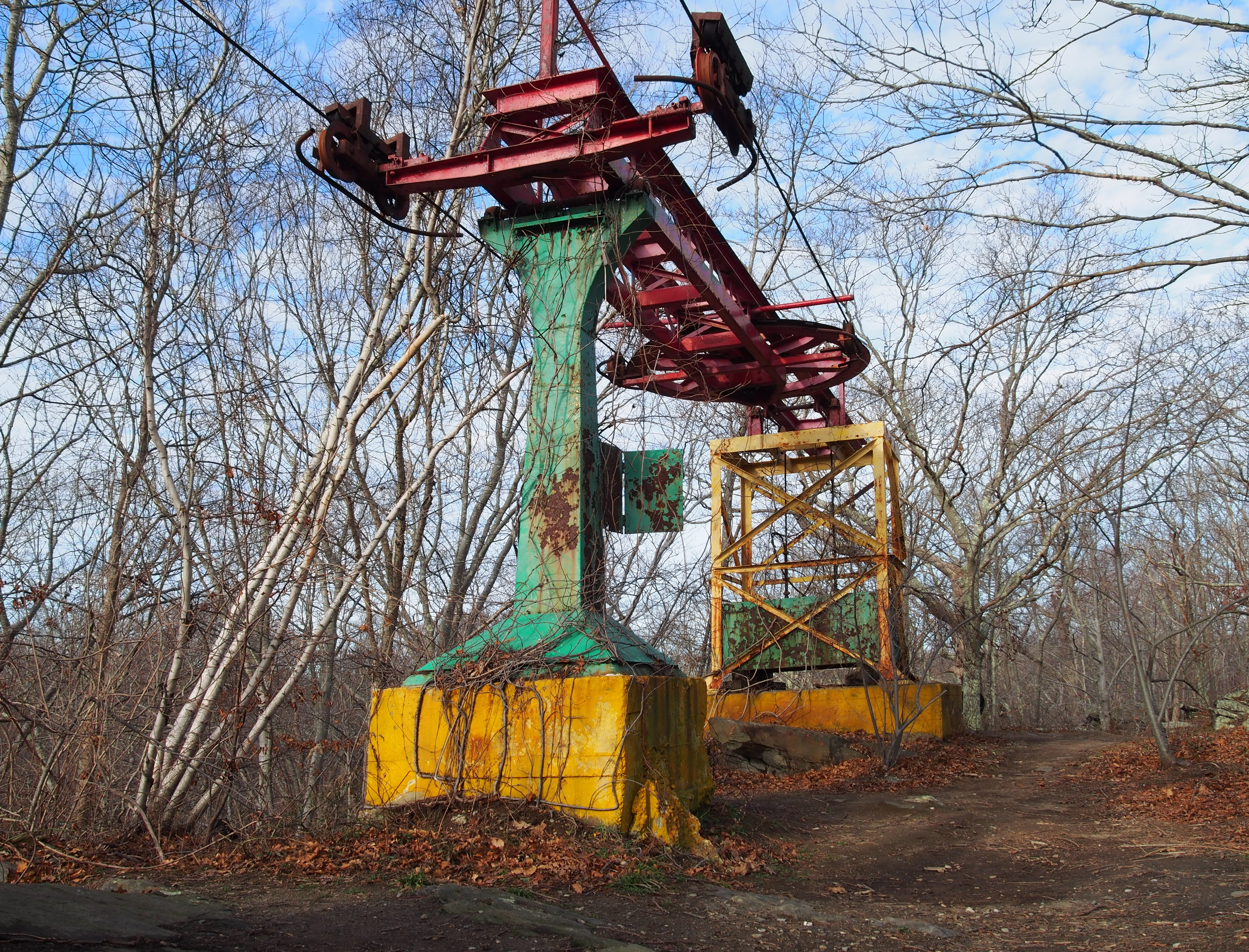
Remnants of the Skyliner ride, 2018

The Rocky Point land was purchased in 2003 for $8.5 million, and its main building called the "Big House" was attacked by vandals who lit it on fire on September 2, 2004.

Another fire started on October 16, 2006, at around 11 a.m., this time in an executive building on the waterfront. Police reported no injuries in either fire. It is unclear if this fire was caused by arson.

On May 7, 2007, demolition of the remaining midway began with a press conference at the park. A handful of stands and minor buildings had already been demolished.

The documentary film You Must Be This Tall: The Story of Rocky Point Park premiered at the Stadium Theater in Woonsocket, Rhode Island on September 7, 2007. The film garnered a five-star review from The Providence Journal and played to a sold-out crowd of 1,100 people.

The city of Warwick secured a federal grant in February 2008 to purchase about half of the 82 acres (33 ha) remaining Rocky Point Park, including much of the view of the bay. The city took title to 41 acres (170,000 m^{2}) shoreline of the former park in August 2008.

A ballot proposal passed on November 2, 2010, to issue state funding to "acquire the title to land in and around what used to be Rocky Point Park to establish the land as a public park." The Small Business Administration accepted the state's offer to purchase the Rocky Point property on September 17, 2012, to be developed into a state park.

The sale was conveyed on March 28, 2013, on the remaining 82 acres of the former amusement to the state of Rhode Island. The Rhode Island Department of Environmental Management (DEM) will oversee the operation and maintenance of the entire property.

== Re-opening ==
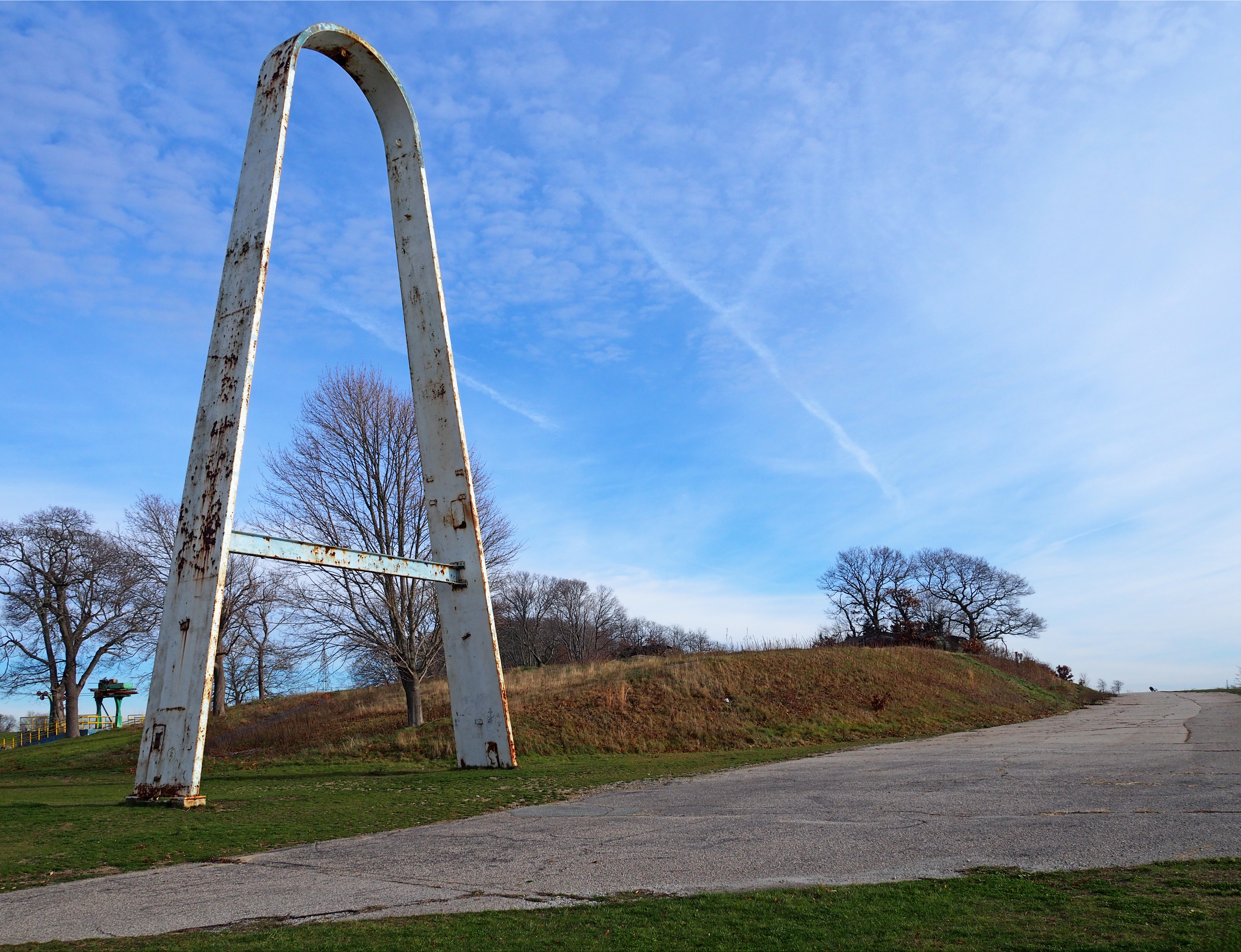
An arch from the amusement park remains in the state park

On June 26, 2011, Rocky Point was once again opened to the public and features a new asphalt mile long walking path along the shore of Narragansett Bay. The Shore Dinner Hall was later demolished while the rest of the amusement area was cleared and opened to the public. The majority of the amusement park space is now an empty field for the passive use park. A few elements of the park remain, including the upper and lower stations for the Skyliner gondola ride, ruins of an old water tank, and a large arch by the entrance that was originally built for the 1964 World's Fair in Flushing, Queens, and subsequently moved to Rocky Point.

As of November 2014, the State of Rhode Island is coordinating the development of Rocky Point State Park with the City of Warwick. Use by the public is being managed by the DEM Parks and Recreation office.

== See also ==
- List of amusement parks in New England
- List of defunct amusement parks
- Amusement ride
