= Invertigo (roller coaster) =

Roller coaster model

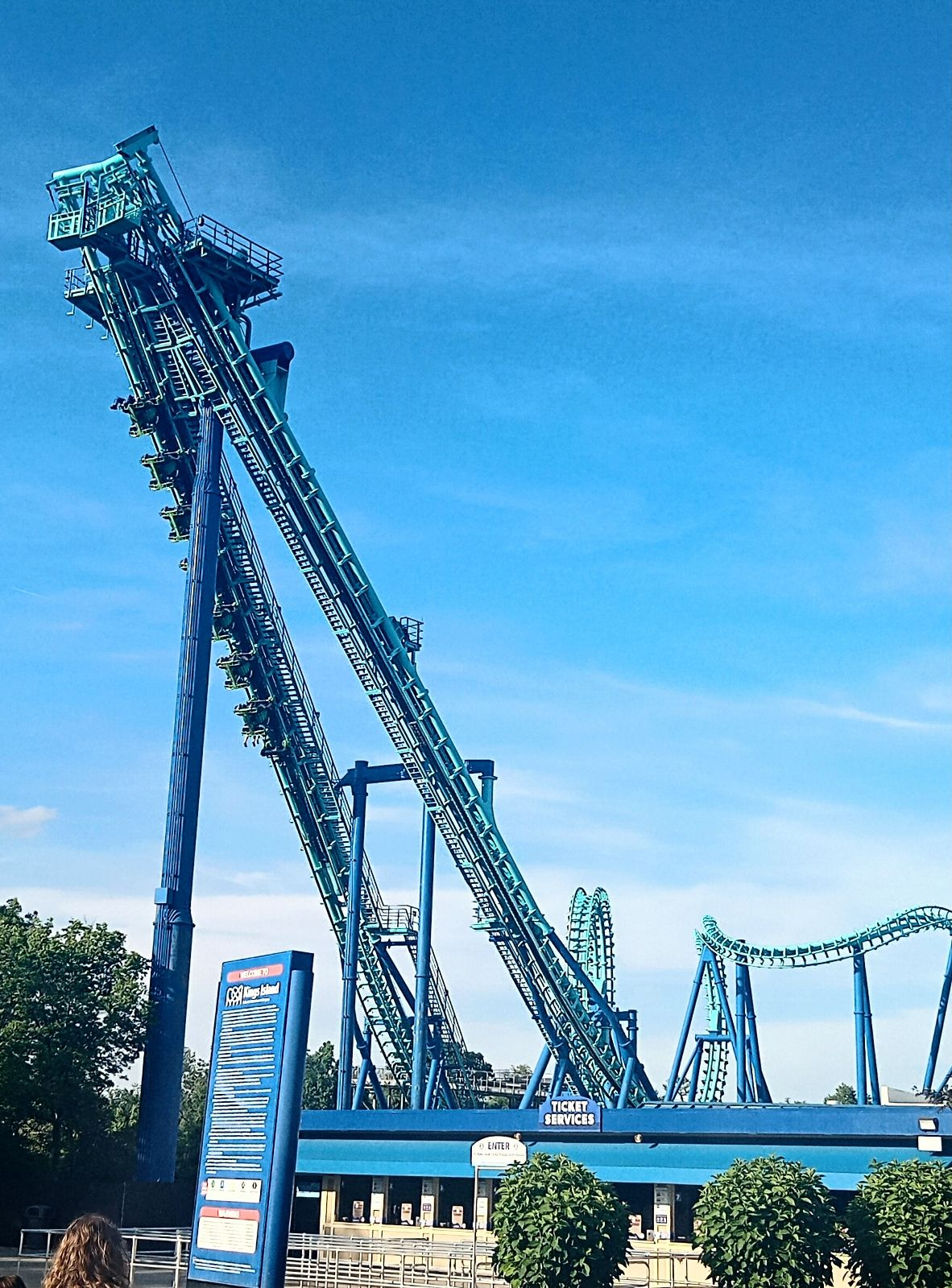
- Invertigo at Kings Island in 2025
- Status: 3 in operation
- First manufactured: 1997
- No. of installations: 4
- Manufacturer: Vekoma
- Height: 131.3 ft (40.0 m)
- Length: 1,013.8 ft (309.0 m)
- Speed: 50 mph (80 km/h)
- G force: 5
- Vehicles: 1
- Riders per vehicle: 28
- Rows: 14
- Riders per row: 2
- Duration: 1:30
- Restraint Style: Over-the-shoulder
- Inversions: 3 (traversed twice)
- Invertigo at RCDB

Invertigo is an inverted shuttle roller coaster model developed and manufactured by Dutch company Vekoma. Four roller coasters based on this model were built, with the first installation opening in 1997 as HangOver at Liseberg amusement park located in Sweden. Three of the four are still in operation. Invertigo is designed as an inverted variation of their traditional Boomerang model, which first appeared in 1984. Invertigo's seat configuration is also a departure from its predecessor, in that riders sit back-to-back, resulting in all rows facing one another with the exception of the first and last.

== History ==
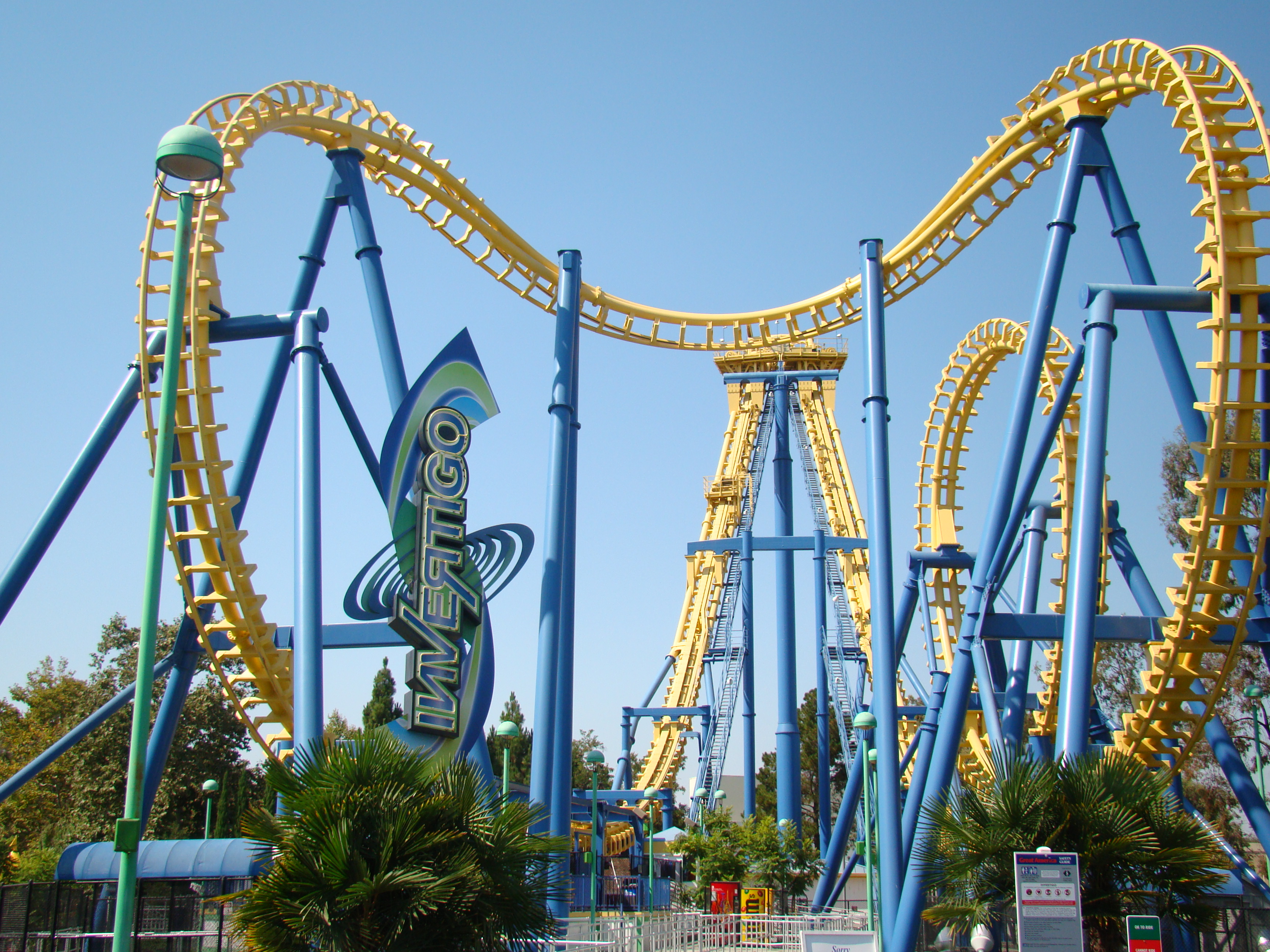
Stinger when it was at California's Great America as Invertigo.

The first installation of an Invertigo roller coaster occurred at Liseberg in 1997. HangOver was originally scheduled to open in 1996 as a launched roller coaster, however, the technology at the time prevented this from occurring and forced the opening back by a year. On March 21, 1998, California's Great America opened a ride known simply as Invertigo. On April 17, 1999, Face/Off opened at Kings Island. It was originally themed after the 1997 Paramount Pictures/Touchstone Pictures film of the same name. On May 8, 1999, Two Face: The Flip Side opened at Six Flags America. It was themed after DC Comics' Batman rival, Harvey Dent A.K.A. Two-Face.

In 2002, HangOver at Liseberg closed and was relocated to Allou Fun Park the following year. The ride, however, was never set up there and was relocated to Sommerland Syd where it operated under the name Tornado from July 2, 2005.

An accident in October 2007 closed Two Face: The Flip Side at Six Flags America indefinitely. The coaster did not reopen for the 2008 season and was sold to a park in Italy. The ride reopened as Diabolik at Movieland Park for the 2015 season.

In 2008, Face/Off at Kings Island was renamed to Invertigo following the park's initiative to remove Paramount themes from the park after being sold to Cedar Fair two years prior.

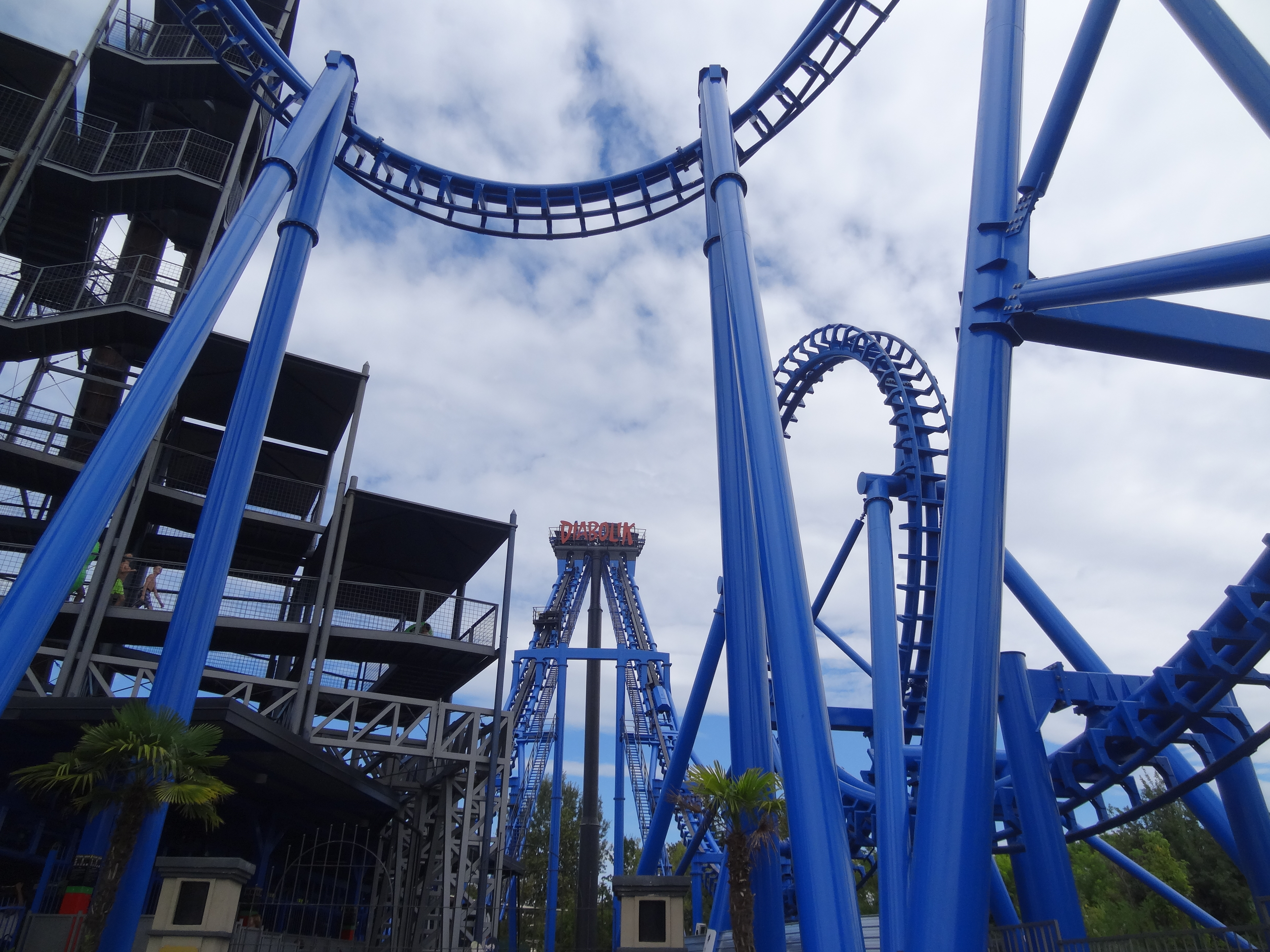
Diabolik at Movieland Park

On January 27, 2011, California's Great America announced that Invertigo would be removed from the park and relocated to a different Cedar Fair park. Invertigo was removed and moved into storage in Allentown, Pennsylvania. During this time, the track received a new teal paint scheme, with the supports remaining in royal blue. On August 30, 2011, Dorney Park & Wildwater Kingdom announced that Invertigo would reopen as Stinger for the park's 2012 season. Construction of the main ride was completed in November 2011, and the station and queue closely followed. An incident on May 3, 2014, resulted in a temporary closure when the coaster experienced a rollback that injured two riders – both were transported to the hospital. During the 2017 offseason, it was announced by Dorney Park that Stinger would be removed to make way for future development. The coaster was demolished in April 2018.

In 2011, Sommerland Syd's installation of Tornado closed with the ride currently being relocated to Bagatelle where it operates as Triops from June 30, 2012.

On February 13, 2012, Kings Island posted a picture of Invertigo getting a new paint scheme on their Facebook page. The ride was given an aqua-colored track and royal blue supports.

On December 15, 2017, Dorney Park announced on their website that Stinger would be removed. The ride was scrapped prior to the 2018 operating season. After Stinger was torn down, its train was reused on Invertigo at Kings Island.

== Installations ==
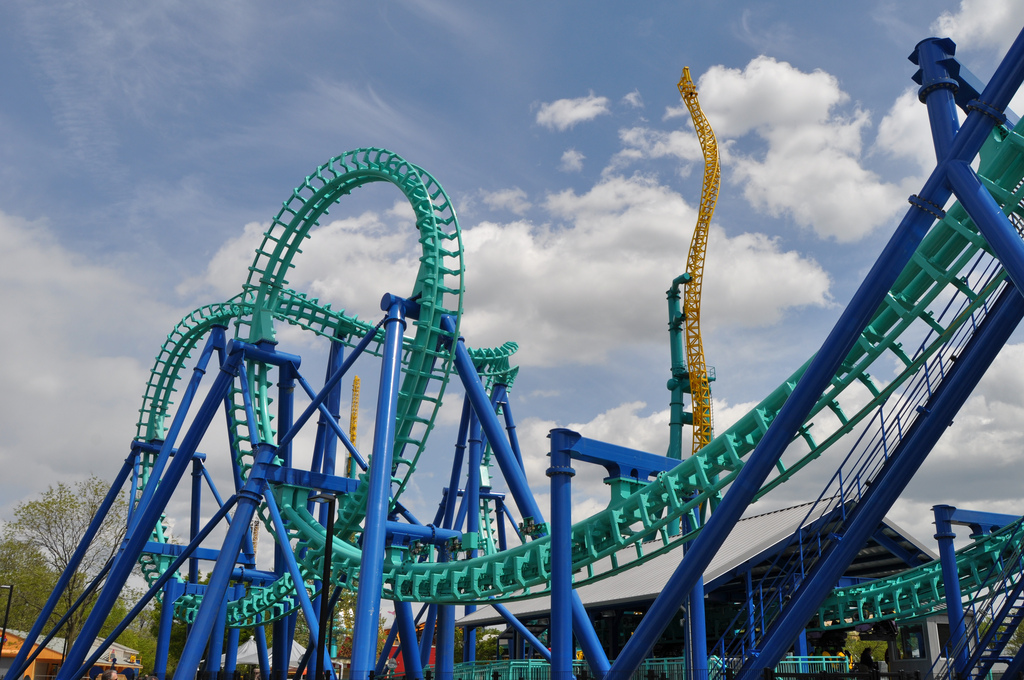
Stinger at Dorney Park & Wildwater Kingdom

Coaster name	Amusement park	Opened	Closed	Status	Refs
Invertigo; Formerly Face/Off	Kings Island	April 20, 2008; April 17, 1999	—N/a	Operating	
Stinger; Formerly Invertigo	Dorney Park & Wildwater Kingdom; California's Great America	April 28, 2012; March 21, 1998	2017	Removed	
Triops; Formerly Tornado; Formerly unknown Formerly HangOver	Bagatelle; Sommerland Syd; Allou Fun Park; Liseberg	June 30, 2012; July 2, 2005; Never opened April 1997	—N/a	Operating	
Diabolik; Formerly Two-Face: The Flip Side	Movieland Park; Six Flags America	April 24, 2015; May 8, 1999	—N/a	Operating	

== Ride experience ==
The layout of an Invertigo roller coaster

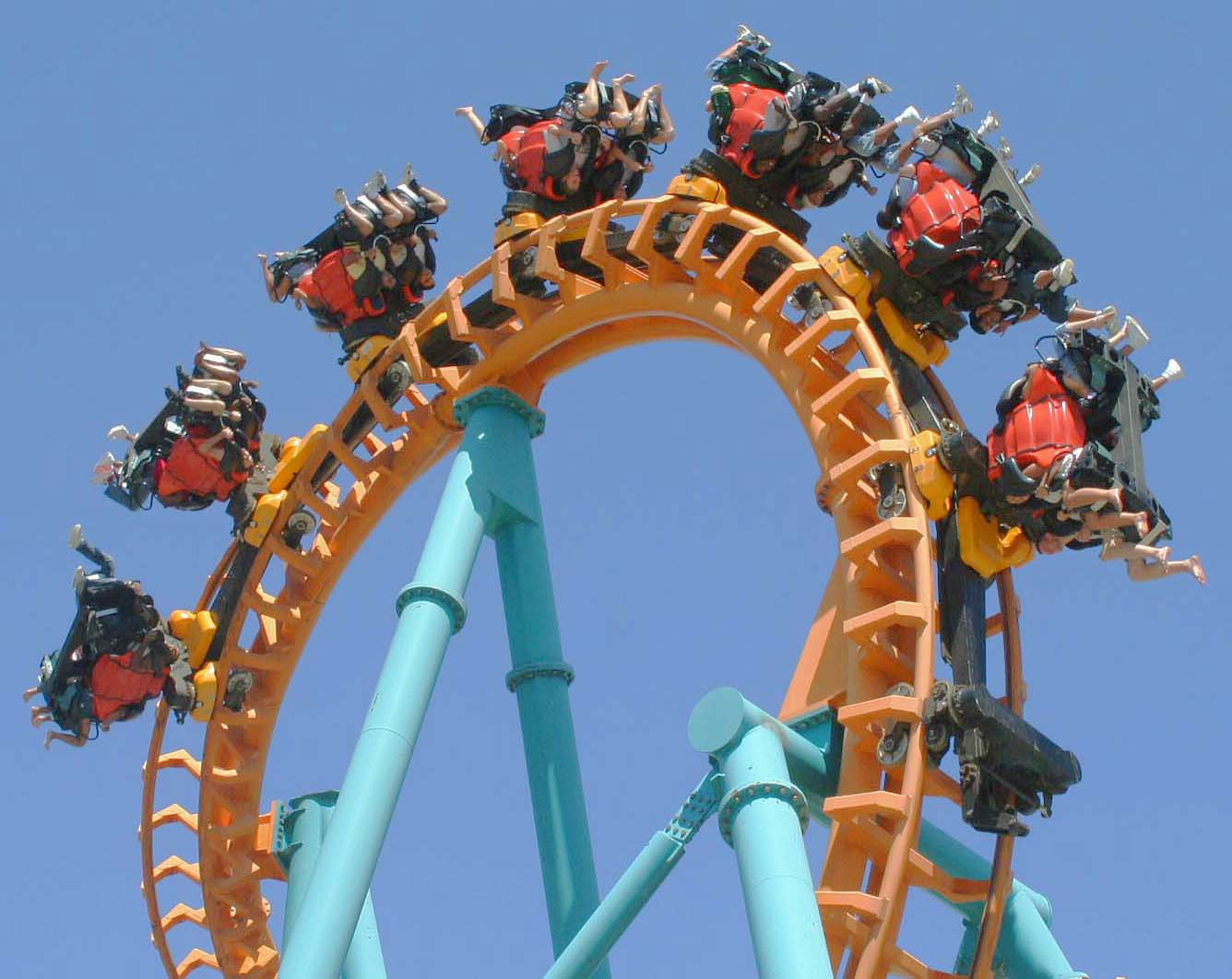
Two-Face: The Flip Side at Six Flags America

Riders sit face-to-face, staring at fellow passengers through the course of the ride. The train completes the circuit twice running in the opposite direction as it returns to the station. This gives riders the opportunity to experience the ride in both directions moving forwards and backwards.

The ride begins when the train is pulled backwards from the station and up a 138-foot-tall (42 m) lift hill. It is held for several seconds before releasing riders into a 130-foot (40 m) drop sending them 55 miles per hour (89 km/h) through the loading station. The train then enters a cobra roll element that transitions into a vertical loop. Upon exiting the loop, the train climbs the second lift hill making it most of the way up on its own momentum. Once towed to the top, the train is quickly released sending riders through the ride in reverse before being caught by the first lift hill and returned to the loading station.

== See also ==
- 2012 in amusement parks
