= Wildcatter (ride) =

Drop tower amusement ride

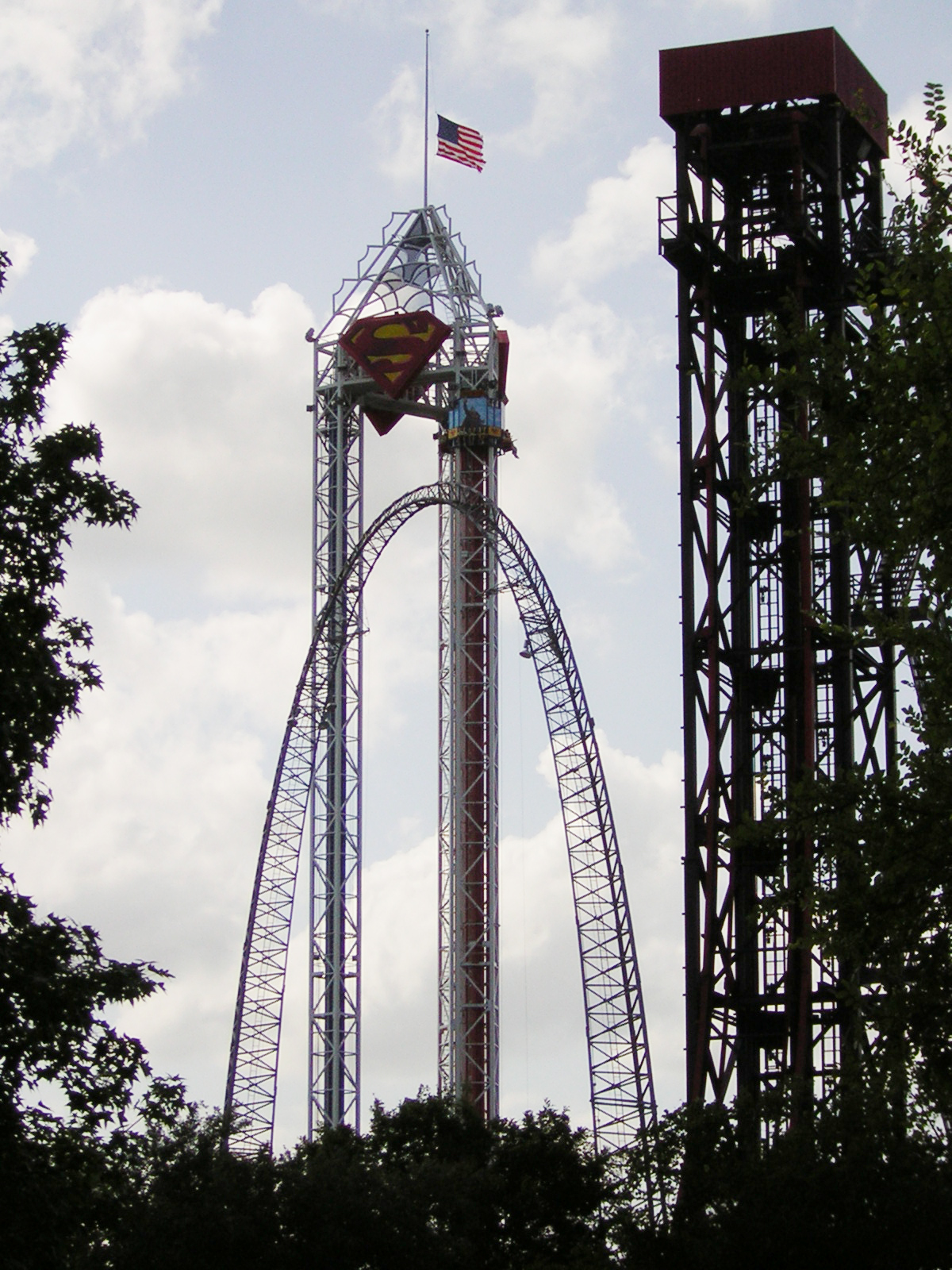
- Wildcatter (right) pictured in 2004, with the Superman: Tower Of Power looming in the background.

Six Flags Over Texas
- Area: Boomtown
- Status: Removed
- Opening date: 1982
- Closing date: 2007

Ride statistics
- Attraction type: Freefall
- Manufacturer: Intamin
- Model: First-Generation Freefall
- Height: 128 ft (39 m)
- Drop: 60 ft (18 m)
- Speed: 55 mph (89 km/h)
- Vehicles: 6
- Riders per vehicle: 4
- Height restriction: 48 in (122 cm)
- Restraints: Over-the-shoulder restraints

Wildcatter (formerly known as G-Force and Texas Cliffhanger) was a 128-foot-tall Intamin First-Generation Freefall ride that operated at Six Flags Over Texas in Arlington, Texas. It was located in the Boomtown section of the park. It closed in September 2007, and was imploded in October 2007.

== History ==
The ride first opened in 1982 as the Texas Cliffhanger, it was the original and first of its kind of the Intamin Freefall towers installed in the world, costed Six Flags Over Texas 2.1 million dollars, the other one being at Six Flags Magic Mountain during the same time. During the span of the next two-decades multiple other Freefall towers were installed at multiple parks around the world.

In 1996, it was renamed to G-Force, originally painted with brown on the full tower structure, and yellow on the gondola track; a new paint-job included black to the full tower structure, and red to the gondola track. In addition, a new four-sided metal plate was installed on the top of the tower, re-themed as the “Air Force Base and Astronaut training center” as part of the addition of the nearby The Right Stuff Adventure Theater. The four-sided metal plate would later use the Six Flags Over Texas logo as the parks signage.

In 2000, it was renamed to Wildcatter "Tejas Oil Drilling", re-themed to give more of an industrial theme of an oil derrick.

=== Closure and demolition ===
Due to the dwindling popularity of the ride, and rise of popularity of the Superman: Tower Of Power, the ride closed in September 2007. On October 2, 2007, Wildcatter was demolished with explosives to make room for the upcoming Tony Hawk's Big Spin rollercoaster (Now known as Pandemonium) for the 2008 season. The tower's supporting legs were cut down, and about 6 lbs of shaped-charge explosives were added to it.

== Ride description ==
Riders sat in small gondolas which were lifted by an elevator shaft 7-stories up into the tower’s structure. The small gondola would slowly move forward, outside of the lift mechanism, onto an outside track, riders would wait 5–10 seconds, until the units were released by chains for a full drop down the l-shaped track. Near the bottom, the guide rails gradually curved, changing directions about roughly 90 degrees, so that it was parallel to the ground. The gondola would then run down the parallel guide rails with the riders on their backs until it returned to the entrance.

== See also ==
- Freefall (ride)

== Primary Sources ==
- and , full of information of Texas Cliffhanger AKA Wildcatter.
