= Hollywood Action Tower =

Intamin Freefall ride at Movieland Park

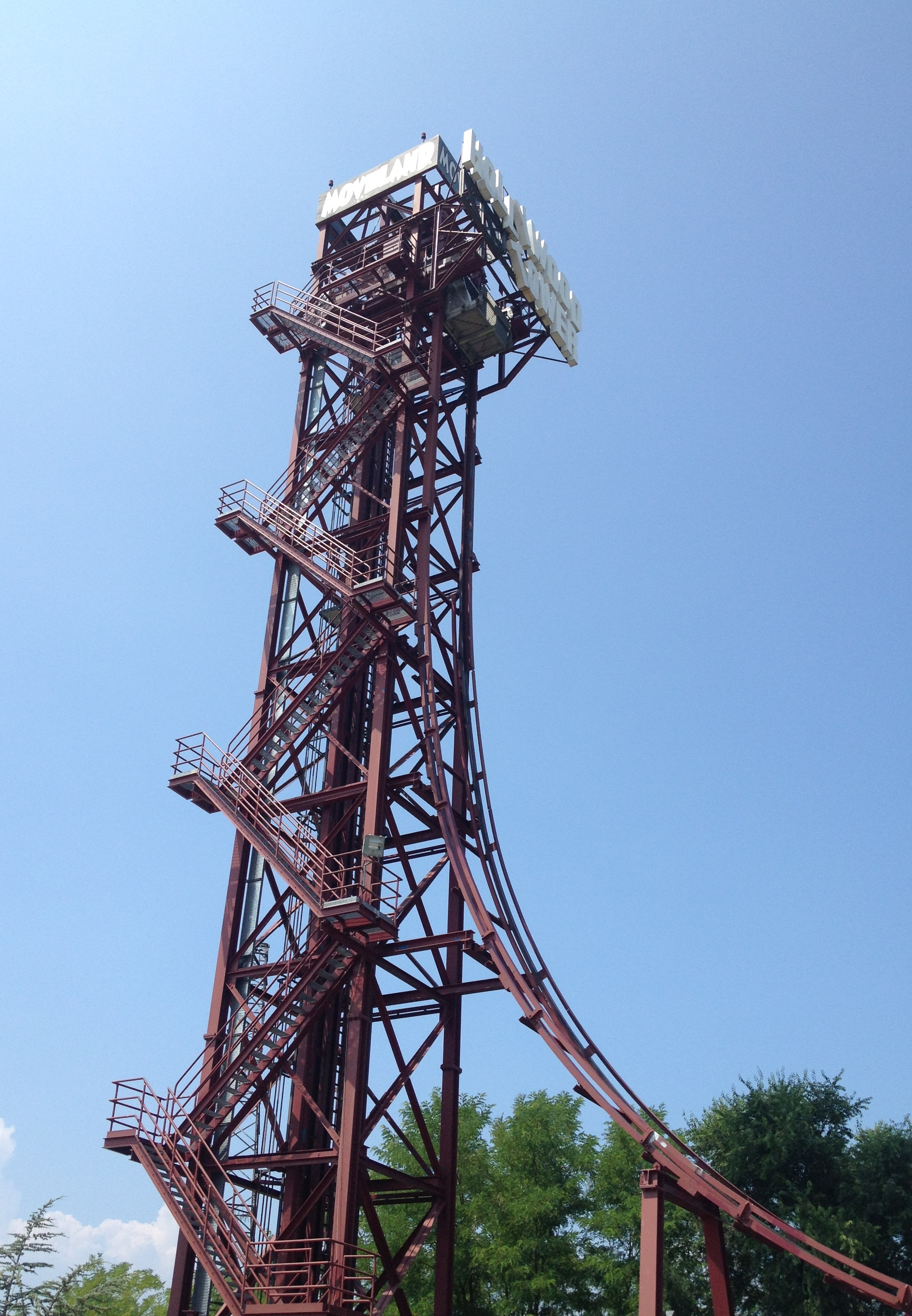
- A view of the lift shaft and drop

Movieland Park
- Area: Main Street
- Status: Operating
- Opening date: October 2006

Galaxyland
- Name: Daring Drop of Doom
- Status: Removed
- Opening date: 1985
- Closing date: 2001
- Replaced by: Space Shot

Ride statistics
- Attraction type: Drop tower
- Manufacturer: Intamin
- Designer: Giovanola
- Model: Freefall (ride)
- Height: 40 m (130 ft)
- Drop: 18 m (59 ft)
- Speed: 82 km/h (51 mph)
- Site area: 7,293 sq ft (677.5 m^{2})
- Capacity: 480 riders per hour
- Vehicles: 3
- Riders per vehicle: 4
- Rows: 1
- Riders per row: 4
- Height restriction: 120 cm (3 ft 11 in)

Hollywood Action Tower is an Intamin Freefall ride at Movieland Park in Lazise, Italy. It originally opened as Daring Drop of Doom at Galaxyland in the West Edmonton Mall in Alberta, Canada.

== History ==
In 1983, Six Flags purchased 2 Freefall models from Intamin, those being Freefall at Six Flags Magic Mountain and Wildcatter at Six Flags Over Texas. This model was the first ride to put riders in a true free fall.

In 1985, Galaxyland (which was then called Fantasyland) installed Daring Drop of Doom, which was the only example of this model in Canada and the 8th installation worldwide. It opened with a yellow-and-blue paint scheme.

In 2001, Galaxyland disassembled Daring Drop of Doom and installed a Space Shot model from S&S in its place. It sold the ride in 2003 to British theme park operator Parkware Ltd. who planned to install it at their Loudoun Castle theme park. However, their planning permission was denied by the local council and the park instead installed a relocated Space Shot from Pleasureland Southport. The ride was put up for sale and sold to Movieland Park, where it was planned to open as Hollywood Tower for the 2006 season. However, due to technical difficulties, it did not open until October of that year.

== Ride experience ==
Riders board a four-person gondola near ground level at the station and secured with an over the shoulder harness. Depending on how the ride is operated, the gondolas are either loaded alone or in groups. The gondola then moves backwards horizontally to the base of the lift tower and engages a vertical lift, which lifts it to the top of the tower. After reaching the top, it slides forward and hangs over the drop track for a few moments as the letters in front of the drop shaft are dropped and fog is released. After the letters are finished moving, the car is suddenly released, dropping riders 18 metres (59 ft). After a brief vertical freefall, the car enters a 90 degree pull-out which transitions into a horizontal brake run. Riders face upward toward the sky as the gondola rolls through the brake run and into a small uphill section. After stopping, the car rolls backwards, engages a mechanism designed to slow the car down as the gondola moves in reverse at down a 45-degree angle to another track, where the wheels engage a track which returns the gondola to an upright position, and finally, engages drive tires which help it return to the station. Riders then unload and exit the attraction.

== See also ==
- Demon Drop, another Freefall model operating at Dorney Park & Wildwater Kingdom.
