= Freefall (ride) =

Type of amusement ride

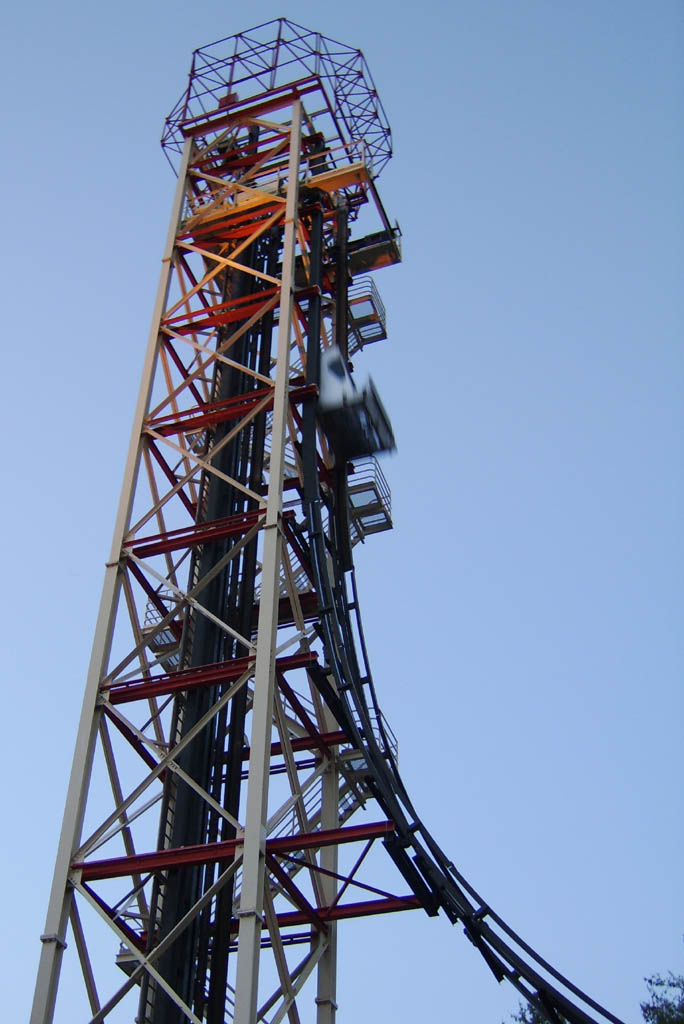
Freefall at Six Flags Over Georgia. This installation has since been removed

The Freefall is an amusement ride developed by Giovanola and marketed throughout the world by Swiss company Intamin.

It was a common ride at major amusement parks until the late 1990s, when the classic freefall rides began being replaced with larger, higher-capacity Drop Tower alternatives. Since then, Freefalls have been disappearing from midways, to be replaced by the newer-technology rides such as the Intamin Giant Drop (2nd generation), Gyro Drop (3rd generation), and the S&S Power series of compressed-air tower rides.

Currently, Demon Drop at Dorney Park & Wildwater Kingdom; Hollywood Action Tower at Movieland Park, Italy; Freefall at Rusutsu Resort, Japan; and Free Fall at Nagashima Spa Land, Japan; are the only remaining Intamin first-generation Freefall rides in operation.

== Ride description ==
The ride can accommodate up to four riders, and consists of three main sections: the loading and unloading station, the lift tower, and the drop and run-out track. Riders are loaded into a gondola type car near ground level at the station and secured with over-the-shoulder harnesses. The gondola is then moved backwards horizontally to the rear base of the lift tower and then climbs vertically to the top of the tower in 7.2 seconds. Once there, it slides forward and hangs over the drop track for a few seconds. Without warning, the car is released and riders drop 60 feet in less than two seconds before experiencing the deceleration g-forces as the car enters a pull-out curve which transitions the vertical fall into a horizontal brake run. As the gondola rolls through the brake run to slow down, the riders are facing the sky. Once it stops at the end of the run, a mechanism swings the top of the car down, and the gondola moves in reverse at a downward 45-degree angle to another track where it returns to an upright position. It then returns to the station in reverse, traveling below the brake run track.

== Incidents ==
=== Illinois ===
On May 22, 1984, an accident occurred on The Edge, a first generation Freefall ride at Marriott's Great America (now Six Flags Great America) in Gurnee, Illinois. A supporting cable snapped, and the mechanism's anti-rollback devices failed to stop the car from plummeting nearly 60 feet to the bottom of the tower. Contrary to public belief and rumor, it did not crash down on top of another car and no one was killed in the accident. Three teens were treated at a local hospital and released. To prevent this type of accident from recurring, Intamin doubled the number of anti-rollbacks on the tower and the ride programming was changed so that a car would not enter the elevator shaft until the previous car completes its descent from the tower. This change slightly lowered the ride's capacity. The Edge re-opened after having been refitted, but the stigma associated with the accident caused ridership to be low and it was eventually closed and removed in 1986.

=== Ohio ===
In 1999, four teenagers were injured after two ride vehicles on Mr. Hyde's Nasty Fall collided at the now defunct Geauga Lake amusement park.

== Installations no longer operating ==
In 1986, The Edge at Six Flags Great America in Illinois was removed due to dwindling ridership after an incident in 1984 and moved to Rocky Point Amusement Park, where it received the generic Freefall name.

In 1995, the Rocky Point Amusement Park closed, and Freefall was moved to Geauga Lake in Ohio where it received a new control system and was renamed Mr. Hyde's Nasty Fall.

In 1995, Paramount's Great America in California removed its first generation Freefall, The Edge, and replaced it with the Drop Zone Stunt Tower.

In 1997, a second generation ride Sky Screamer was removed from Six Flags AstroWorld.

In 2002, The "Drop of Doom", a first generation freefall at West Edmonton Mall's Galaxyland was removed.

In 2004, Loudoun Castle theme park in Scotland applied for planning permission to install an Intamin Freefall. However, the planning permission took too long to be granted and the park sold the ride in order to plan for a new attraction for the 2005 season. Loudoun's new ride opened in 2007 and was an S&S Power Double Shot tower drop ride.

In 2006, the Drop of Doom was rebranded as the "Hollywood Tower" in Italy. It now uses elements similar to those found on The Twilight Zone Tower of Terror.

In January 2006, Mr. Hyde's Nasty Fall, a first generation Freefall originally installed at Six Flags Great America in Gurnee, Illinois was dismantled at Geauga Lake. The salvageable parts were sent to Cedar Point, another Cedar Fair Amusement Park in Ohio, to be used for Demon Drop until it was also dismantled in 2009.

In 2006, Six Flags Great Adventure removed its first generation ride, Stuntman's Free Fall.

In December 2006, Six Flags Over Georgia dismantled Freefall, a first generation ride.

In September 2007, Six Flags Over Texas imploded the original Freefall, Wildcatter, which was originally named Texas Cliffhanger.

In February 2008, Freefall from Six Flags Magic Mountain was dismantled. The ride was standing but not operating from 2005 to 2006.

In 2009, at the end of the operating season, Cedar Point removed its first generation freefall ride, Demon Drop. The ride was originally planned to move to Knott's Berry Farm for the 2010 season, but the ride ended up at Dorney Park instead with the same name. The Dorney Park installation is the last standing/operating 1st generation operating in North America.

In 2018, Beto Carrero World removed "Elevador". It is rumored to be sold to a new-built park in Cotia, near São Paulo.

In 2019, Tokyo Summerland permanently closed "Free Fall".

In 2022, Himeji Central Park ceased operations of "Free Fall".
