= Movieland Park =

Theme park in Lazise, Italy

- Previously known as Movie Studios Park (2003-2005); Movieland Studios (2006-2012)
- The entrance archway to Movieland Park
- Interactive map of Movieland Park
- Location: CanevaWorld Resort, Lazise, Verona, Italy
- Coordinates: 45.476477°N 10.7256826°E
- Opened: 2003
- Theme: Movie Studio

Attractions
- Roller coasters: 1*

Movieland Park is a theme park located in Lazise close to the shore of Lake Garda. It is a part of the CanevaWorld Resort entertainment complex.

== History ==
In 2001, construction began on the theme park, then known as "Mister Movie Studios." On June 21, 2002, the "Rambo Action Show" opened to the public next to the already existing Caneva Aquapark complex, while the rest of the park was still under construction. The next year, in 2003, the full theme park opened to the public. The theme park was modeled after existing American theme parks such as Universal Studios Hollywood and Disney-MGM Studios, however, it initially focused more on shows than attractions. The park originally opened with 4 themed areas:

- The Main Street Set: the first area you enter when you walk in; inspired by Hollywood Boulevard from Disney-MGM Studios.
- Little Italy Set: The second area you enter when you leave the Main Street Set; themed to the Little Italy neighborhood in New York City
- U.S. Army Set: a large stage with props which hosts the Rambo Action Show and the Kitt Superjet ride
- X-City: a futuristic themed area, rethemed twice in 2010 and 2026.

For a few years after the park was formally known as "Movie Studios Park," the entrance archway still had the old "Mister Movie Studios" name on it. The park also opened with a system of Utilidors inspired by the ones in the Magic Kingdom at Walt Disney World.

In 2006, the park was renamed to Movieland Studios, along with the addition of several attractions such as the Hollywood Action Tower. In 2012, the park was renamed again to Movieland Park.

== Attractions ==
=== Current rides ===
The park currently has 25 attractions divided into three thrill levels: Action, Adventure, and Family.

Name	Experience	Manufacturer	Year	Photo
Gran Canyon Steamer	Mine-themed log flume ride featuring giant insects and indoor sections along with two drops and a dual loading station	L&T Systems	2003 (X-Splash) 2009 (Troncosaurus) 2026	
Casinò	An interactive octopus ride with a western theme, where guests throw foam balls toward targets that, when hit, raise and lower the arms.	Unknown	2003 (X-Spin) 2009 (Oktopus) 2026	
Panorama Tram	A scenic monorail that offers a look behind the scenes of the park. Before 2019 it was inspired by the Back to the Future series, but as of 2020 the ride is narrated by the park's mascot, Movy.	Intamin	2003 (Back to the Backstage) 2020 (Panorama Tram)	
Magma 2.1	A MAN KAT1 driven by a real stunt driver going through A South American geothermal power plant in the middle of an earthquake. The attraction is inspired by disaster films.	MAN SE	2003 (first version)	
The Horror House presents: Holmes Hotel	A haunted house walkthrough attraction inspired by the hotel where serial killer H. H. Holmes committed a series of murders in late 19th-century Chicago. The attraction is a retheme of the park's former Horror House.		2003 (Horror House) 2021 (Holmes Hotel)	
K6 – The Royal Intelligence Agency	A retheme of the park's old U-571 attraction, with a new story and name inspired by the Kingsman franchise, inside of a small area themed to London.		2006 (U-571) 2025 (K6)	
Hollywood Action Tower	An Intamin Freefall ride, one of 4 in operation and the only one in Europe. The theme is inspired by the Twilight Zone Tower of Terror rides at the Disney parks, and by proxy to the Twilight Zone series. The attraction originally opened as Daring Drop of Doom in 1985 at Galaxyland in Alberta, Canada before moving here for the 2006 season.	Intamin AG	2006	
Katapult	Water balloon fight attraction.		2009	
Cooter's Rodeo	A swing ride powered by a truck's wheels.		2009	
Route 66	Mini-car ride similar to Disney's Autopia where guests drive through scenes inspired by the Hollywood Hills.		2009	
Iron Pick	A pirate ship ride from Intamin themed to a pickaxe.	Intamin	2010 (BC-10 Airlines) 2026 (Iron Pick)	
The SuperJet	A jetboat attraction driven by a real stuntman, based on the series Knight Rider.	In-house	2013	
Diabolik Invertigo	A Vekoma Invertigo with a theme based on a Diabolik story created specifically for the park. The attraction originally opened in 1999 at Six Flags America as Two Face: The Flip Side and it is one of three in operation worldwide and one of two in Europe.	Vekoma	2015	
We Are Back - Kids from the future	4D film inspired by the Back to the Future series.	Moviemex3D	2024	
Fantasmik - Adventure in the Mistery House	A walkthrough haunted house for children, next to the Holmes Hotel and within the Moviestar Cafe.		2017	
Pangea - The World of Dinosaurs	Guests pilot a jeep through a jungle with animatronic dinosaurs, inspired by Jurassic Park.	In-house	2018	
Kitt MiniJet	Mini speedboats that can be driven by children. Considered a scaled-down version of the nearby Kitt SuperJet, with boats loosely themed to ones from the Cars franchise.		2019	
Bandido - The Magic Ride	4D film with a Western-style cartoon.		2019	
Space Jumper	A children's attraction featuring a series of slides and inflatables.		2024	
Space Mission Orbit	An S&S Combo Tower themed to a rocket launch. Riders experience up to +4Gs (during the launch) and -1Gs (during the power drop) The attraction was relocated from Dixie Landin' in Louisiana, USA, where it was called Hot Shot.	S&S	2021	
Antares - Interstellar Space Lines	A highly themed Gravitron ride with screens facing riders themed to an interstellar "space line"		2022	
Disaster - The Blockbuster Tour	Riders board a bus and drive through recreated sets from blockbuster movies. It is inspired by the Backlot Tour from Universal Studios Hollywood.		2024	
The Driller	A Schwarzkopf Apollo 14 model, of which two were built. Riders can control their motion by manipulating wings on top of the seats similar to a Gerstlauer Sky Fly.	Schwarzkopf	2026	

=== Defunct rides ===
Name	Experience	Manufacturer	Year
Troncosaurus	A log flume that was named X-Splash until 2009. Rethemed in 2026 into Gran Canyon Steamer.	L&T Systems	2003
Oktopus	An 2009 come X-Spin. Replaced in 2026 by Casinò.	Soriani & Moser	2003
Back to the Backstage	A scenic monorail themed to the Back to the Future series. Rethemed in 2020 into the Panorama Tram.		2003
The Horror House	A haunted house walkthrough attraction inspired by horror films.		2003
U-571	An Astroliner attraction inspired by the film U-571 which simulates the sinking of a German submarine during World War II. It begins with a pre-show in which guests experience an air raid while inside a military hangar; they are then led down into the submarine, where a dive sequence is simulated as depth charges strike the U-boat, causing large amounts of water to pour over the guests. It was relocated from the nearby Gardaland, where it operated as Asterline Saturno 7 from 1979 to 1987.		2006
Bront'o Ring	Powered roller coaster for children. Named X-Smile until 2009.	DAL Amusement Rides Company	2007
Tomb Raider Machine	A Zamperla Windshear model, similar to a Top Spin but with independent moving arms.	Zamperla	
BC-10 Airlines	A Pirate ship themed to prehistoric times. Rethemed in 2026 into Iron Pick.	Intamin	2010
Android	A 4D cinema combining 3D projections, special effects, and live actors in a story inspired by the Transformers film series..	Moviemex3D	2017
Terminator 5D	A show based on the Terminator films featuring actors and special effects, later transformed into a shooting game with the same theme.		2004
Police Academy	A 4D film which simulated training to become real police officers, inspired by the Police Academy franchise. Rethemed in 2019 into Bandido: The Magic Ride.		2009
Space Ranger	A futuristic-themed Bumper car ride with a laser game system integrated into the vehicles.		2021
