= Amusement Today =

American trade magazine

- Editor-in-Chief: Gary Slade
- Categories: Amusement parks
- Circulation: 3,000
- Publisher: Gary Slade
- Founder: Gary Slade
- Founded: 1997
- First issue: April 1997
- Country: United States
- Based in: Arlington, Texas
- Language: English
- Website: www.amusementtoday.com

Amusement Today is a monthly periodical that features articles, news, pictures, and reviews about all things relating to the amusement park industry, including parks, rides, and ride manufacturers. The trade newspaper, which is based in Arlington, Texas, United States, was founded in January 1997 by Gary Slade, Virgil E. Moore III and Rick Tidrow.

In 1997, Amusement Today won the Impact Award in the services category for "Best New Product" from the International Association of Amusement Parks and Attractions (IAAPA). A year later, in 1998, the magazine founded the Golden Ticket Awards, for which it has become best known throughout the amusement park industry. On January 2, 2001, Slade bought out his two partners, giving him sole ownership of the paper. The paper has two full-time and two part-time staff members at its Arlington office, along with two full-time writers and several freelance writers in various parts of the world.

== Golden Ticket Awards ==
Every year, Amusement Today gives out awards to the best in the amusement park industry in a ceremony known as the Golden Ticket Awards. The awards are handed out based on surveys of experienced, well-traveled amusement park enthusiasts from around the world. The awards, first presented in 1998, have been featured on the Discovery Channel and the Travel Channel.

=== 2026 winners ===
2026 Golden Ticket Awards
Host: COTALAND

The Amusement Today Golden Ticket Awards were announced on September 12, 2026.

Category	Rank	2026 Recipient	Location/Park
Best Park	1	Europa-Park	Rust, Germany
Best Park	2	Dollywood	Pigeon Forge, Tennessee
Best Park	3	Universal Epic Universe	Orlando, Florida
Best Park	4	Knoebels Amusement Resort	Elysburg, Pennsylvania
Best Park	5	Tokyo DisneySea	Urayasu, Japan
Best Waterpark	1	Holiday World & Splashin' Safari	Santa Claus, Indiana
Best Waterpark	2	Volcano Bay	Orlando, Florida
Best Waterpark	3	Schlitterbahn	New Braunfels, Texas
Best Waterpark	4	Rulantica	Rust, Germany
Best Waterpark	5	Hyland Hills Water World	Federal Heights, Colorado
Best Family Park	1	Santa's Village	Jefferson, New Hampshire
Best Family Park	2	Dutch Wonderland	Lancaster, Pennsylvania
Best Family Park	3	Legoland Florida	Winter Haven, Florida
Best Family Park	4	Morgan's Wonderland	San Antonio, Texas
Best Family Park	5	Story Land	Glen, New Hampshire
Best Family Coaster	1	Big Bear Mountain	Dollywood
Best Family Coaster	2	Hiccup's Wing Gliders	Universal Epic Universe
Best Family Coaster	3	Mecalodon	Walibi Belgium
Best Family Coaster	4	Bobcat	Six Flags Great Escape
Best Family Coaster	5	Big Thunder Mountain Railroad	Magic Kingdom
Breakout Family Entertainment Center	1	Level99	Lake Buena Vista, Florida
Breakout Family Entertainment Center	2	Universal Horror Unleashed	Las Vegas, Nevada
Breakout Family Entertainment Center	3	Atlas9	Kansas City, Missouri
Breakout Family Entertainment Center	4	Thrillz Adventure Park	Doraville, Georgia
Breakout Family Entertainment Center	5	Do The Beach	North Port, Florida
Most Beautiful Park	1	Dollywood	Pigeon Forge, Tennessee
Most Beautiful Park	2	Busch Gardens Williamsburg	Williamsburg, Virginia
Most Beautiful Park	3	Efteling	Kaatsheuvel, The Netherlands
Most Beautiful Park	4	Europa-Park	Rust, Germany
Most Beautiful Park	5	Tivoli Gardens	Copenhagen, Denmark
Best Water Ride	1	Chiapas	Phantasialand
Best Water Ride	2	Mission Bermudes	Futuroscope
Best Water Ride	3	Dudley Do-Right's Ripsaw Falls	Universal Islands of Adventure
Best Water Ride	4	Valhalla	Blackpool Pleasure Beach
Best Water Ride	5	Jurassic World: The Ride	Universal Studios Hollywood
Best Kids' Area	1	Dollywood	Pigeon Forge, Tennessee
Best Kids' Area	2	Kings Island	Kings Mills, Ohio
Best Kids' Area	3	Universal Epic Universe	Orlando, Florida
Best Kids' Area	4	Knott's Berry Farm	Buena Park, California
Best Kids' Area	5	Canada's Wonderland	Vaughan, Ontario
Best New Show	1	Monster Mash Bash	Six Flags Fiesta Texas
Best New Show	2	Vinyl to Viral	Cedar Point
Best New Show	3	Memories in Motion	Six Flags Great America
Best New Show	4	Hollywood Hits	Kings Island
Best New Show	5	Twinkling Thru Time	Hersheypark
Best New Roller Coaster	1	Falcons Flight	Six Flags Qiddiya City
Best New Roller Coaster	2	Tormenta Rampaging Run	Six Flags Over Texas
Best New Roller Coaster	3	Quantum Accelerator	Six Flags New England
Best New Roller Coaster	4	Colossus	Six Flags Qiddiya City
Best New Roller Coaster	5	GalactiCoaster	Legoland Florida
Best New Family Attraction	1	Phantom Theater: Opening Nightmare	Kings Island
Best New Family Attraction	2	WingZ of Wonder	Morgan's Wonderland
Best New Family Attraction	3	The Enchanted Greenhouse	Six Flags Qiddiya City
Best New Family Attraction	4	Bello Bay Cruise	Universal Kids Resort
Best New Family Attraction	5	Expédition Nautibus	Grand Aquarium Saint-Malo
Best New Water Park Attraction	1	Aquaticar	Aquarabia
Best New Water Park Attraction	2	Power Rapids	Aquatopia
Best New Water Park Attraction	3	Presque Isle Plunge	Waldameer & Water World
Best New Water Park Attraction	4	Reef Runners	Seabreeze
Best New Water Park Attraction	5	Nitro Blast	NRH2O
Best New Attraction Installation	1	Falcons Flight	Six Flags Qiddiya City
Best New Attraction Installation	2	Phantom Theater: Opening Nightmare	Kings Island
Best New Attraction Installation	3	WingZ of Wonder	Morgan's Wonderland
Best New Attraction Installation	4	GalactiCoaster	Legoland Florida
Best New Attraction Installation	5	Junoon Drop	Aquarabia
Best New Attraction Installation	5	Reef Runners	Seabreeze
Best Guest Experience	1	Dollywood	Pigeon Forge, Tennessee
Best Guest Experience	2	Europa-Park	Rust, Germany
Best Guest Experience	3	Holiday World & Splashin' Safari	Santa Claus, Indiana
Best Guest Experience	4	Knoebels Amusement Resort	Elysburg, Pennsylvania
Best Guest Experience	5	Disneyland	Anaheim, California
Best Dark Ride	1	Monsters Unchained: The Frankenstein Experiment	Universal Epic Universe
Best Dark Ride	2	Harry Potter and the Battle at the Ministry	Universal Epic Universe
Best Dark Ride	3	Star Wars: Rise of the Resistance	Disney's Hollywood Studios
Best Dark Ride	4	Danse Macabre	Efteling
Best Dark Ride	5	Pirates of the Caribbean: Battle for the Sunken Treasure	Shanghai Disneyland
Best Waterpark Ride	1	Mammoth	Splashin' Safari
Best Waterpark Ride	2	Wildebeest	Splashin' Safari
Best Waterpark Ride	3	Cheetah Chase	Splashin' Safari
Best Waterpark Ride	4	Krakatau Aqua Coaster	Volcano Bay
Best Waterpark Ride	5	Junoon Drop	Aquarabia
Best New Theme Concept	1	GalactiCoaster	Legoland Florida & California
Best New Theme Concept	2	Flying Fox	Kentucky Kingdom
Best New Theme Concept	3	The Enchanted Greenhouse	Six Flags Qiddiya City
Best New Theme Concept	4	Expédition Nautibus	Grand Aquarium Saint-Malo
Best New Theme Concept	5	Kyûbi Unchained	Parc Spirou Provence
Leadership Award	1	Franceen Gonzales	Enchanted Parks
Leadership Award	2	Ryan Eldredge	Six Flags
Leadership Award	3	James Harhi	Enchanted Parks

Top 50 Steel Roller Coasters
Rank	2026 Recipient	Park	Supplier	Year
1	Fury 325	Carowinds	B&M	2015
2	Jurassic World Velocicoaster	Universal Islands of Adventure	Intamin	2021
3	Steel Vengeance	Cedar Point	Rocky Mountain Construction	2018
4	Iron Gwazi	Busch Gardens Tampa Bay	Rocky Mountain Construction	2022
5	Ride to Happiness	Plopsaland De Panne	Mack	2021
6	Millennium Force	Cedar Point	Intamin	2000
7	Zadra	Energylandia	Rocky Mountain Construction	2019
8	Taron	Phantasialand	Intamin	2016
9	Voltron Nevera	Europa-Park	Mack	2024
10	Stardust Racers	Universal Epic Universe	Mack	2025
11	ArieForce One	Fun Spot America Atlanta	Rocky Mountain Construction	2023
12	Maverick	Cedar Point	Intamin	2007
13	AlpenFury	Canada's Wonderland	Premier Rides	2025
14	Expedition GeForce	Holiday Park	Intamin	2001
15	Guardians of the Galaxy: Cosmic Rewind	Epcot	Vekoma	2022
16	Phantom's Revenge	Kennywood	Morgan / Arrow	2001
17	Superman: The Ride	Six Flags New England	Intamin	2000
18	Pantherian	Kings Dominion	Intamin	2010
19	F.L.Y.	Phantasialand	Vekoma	2020
20	Apollo's Chariot	Busch Gardens Williamsburg	B&M	1999
21	Leviathan	Canada's Wonderland	B&M	2012
22	Falcons Flight	Six Flags Qiddiya City	Intamin	2025
23	Top Thrill 2	Cedar Point	Zamperla	2026
24	Hagrid's Magical Creatures Motorbike Adventure	Universal Islands of Adventure	Intamin	2019
25	Wildcat's Revenge	Hersheypark	Rocky Mountain Construction	2023
26	Diamondback	Kings Island	B&M	2009
27	Kondaa	Walibi Belgium	Intamin	2021
28	Mako	SeaWorld Orlando	B&M	2016
29	Helix	Liseberg	Mack	2014
30	Iron Rattler	Six Flags Fiesta Texas	Rocky Mountain Construction	2013
31	Nitro	Six Flags Great Adventure	B&M	2001
32	X2	Six Flags Magic Mountain	Arrow	2002
33	Time Traveler	Silver Dollar City	Mack	2018
34	Toutatis	Parc Astérix	Intamin	2023
35	Eejanaika	Fuji-Q Highland	S&S Worldwide	2006
36	Taiga	Linnanmäki	Intamin	2019
37	Hyperion	Energylandia	Intamin	2018
38	Magnum XL-200	Cedar Point	Arrow	1989
39	Lightning Rod	Dollywood	Rocky Mountain Construction	2016
40	Big Bear Mountain	Dollywood	Vekoma	2023
40	Lech Coaster	Legendia	Vekoma	2017
42	Montu	Busch Gardens Tampa Bay	B&M	1996
43	Twisted Colossus	Six Flags Magic Mountain	Rocky Mountain Construction	2015
44	Raging Bull	Six Flags Great America	B&M	1999
45	Orion	Kings Island	B&M	2020
46	Alpengeist	Busch Gardens Williamsburg	B&M	1997
47	Skyrush	Hersheypark	Intamin	2012
48	Pantheon	Busch Gardens Williamsburg	Intamin	2022
49	Candymonium	Hersheypark	B&M	2020
49	Siren's Curse	Cedar Point	Vekoma	2025

Top 50 Wood Roller Coasters
Rank	2026 Recipient	Park	Supplier	Year
1	The Voyage	Holiday World	The Gravity Group	2006
2	Phoenix	Knoebels Amusement Resort	Dinn / PTC / Schmeck	1985
3	El Toro	Six Flags Great Adventure	Intamin	2006
4	The Beast	Kings Island	KECO	1979
5	Mystic Timbers	Kings Island	Great Coasters International	2017
6	Thunderhead	Dollywood	Great Coasters International	2004
7	GhostRider	Knott's Berry Farm	Custom Coasters Inc.	1998
8	Ravine Flyer II	Waldameer & Water World	The Gravity Group	2008
9	Outlaw Run	Silver Dollar City	Rocky Mountain Construction	2013
10	Boulder Dash	Lake Compounce	Custom Coasters Inc.	2000
11	Wodan	Europa-Park	Great Coasters International	2012
12	Wildfire	Kolmården	Rocky Mountain Construction	2016
13	Balder	Liseberg	Intamin	2003
14	The Legend	Holiday World	Custom Coasters Inc.	2000
15	Comet	Great Escape	PTC / Schmeck	1994
16	Cyclone	Luna Park (Coney Island)	Baker / Keenan	1927
17	Twister	Knoebels Amusement Resort	Fetterman	1999
18	Colossos	Heide Park	Intamin	2001
19	Gold Striker	California's Great America	Great Coasters International	2013
20	Jack Rabbit	Kennywood	Miller	1920
21	Boardwalk Bullet	Kemah Boardwalk	The Gravity Group	2007
22	Shivering Timbers	Michigan's Adventure	Custom Coasters Inc.	1998
23	Grizzly	Kings Dominion	KECO	1982
24	Troy	Toverland	Great Coasters International	2007
25	Rutschebanen	Tivoli Gardens	L.A. Thompson	1914
26	Texas Stingray	SeaWorld San Antonio	Great Coasters International	2020
26	Prowler	Worlds of Fun	Great Coasters International	2009
28	Goliath	Six Flags Great America	Rocky Mountain Construction	2014
29	Joris en de Draak	Efteling	Great Coasters International	2010
30	Thunderbolt	Kennywood	Vettel / Miller	1968
31	Flying Turns	Knoebels Amusement Resort	Fetterman	2014
32	The Raven	Holiday World	Custom Coasters Inc.	1995
33	Coaster	Playland	Phare	1958
34	Lightning Racer	Hersheypark	Great Coasters International	2000
34	T Express	Everland	Intamin	2008
36	Cú Chulainn	Emerald Park	The Gravity Group	2015
37	Bobcat	Great Escape	The Gravity Group	2024
38	Wicker Man	Alton Towers	Great Coasters International	2018
39	Racer	Kennywood	Miller-Mach	1927
40	Zippin Pippin	Bay Beach	MVR	2011
41	The Boss	Six Flags St. Louis	Custom Coasters Inc.	2000
42	Comet	Hersheypark	PTC / Schmeck	1946
43	Hades 360	Mount Olympus Theme Park	The Gravity Group	2005
44	Cornball Express	Indiana Beach	Custom Coasters Inc.	1999
45	White Lightning	Fun Spot Orlando	Great Coasters International	2013
45	Wooden Warrior	Quassy Amusement Park	The Gravity Group	2011
47	Giant Dipper	Santa Cruz Beach Boardwalk	Prior & Church / Looff	1924
47	Renegade	Valleyfair	Great Coasters International	2007
49	Rampage	Alabama Adventure	Custom Coasters Inc.	1998
50	El Toro	Freizeitpark Plohn	Great Coasters International	2009

=== 2025 winners ===
2025 Golden Ticket Awards
Host: Carowinds

The Amusement Today Golden Ticket Awards were announced on September 6, 2025.

Category	Rank	2025 Recipient	Location/Park
Best Park	1	Europa-Park	Rust, Germany
Best Park	2	Universal Epic Universe	Orlando, Florida
Best Park	3	Dollywood	Pigeon Forge, Tennessee
Best Park	4	Phantasialand	Brühl, Germany
Best Park	5	Silver Dollar City	Branson, Missouri
Best Waterpark	1	Universal Volcano Bay Water Theme Park	Orlando, Florida
Best Waterpark	2	Schlitterbahn	New Braunfels, Texas
Best Waterpark	3	Holiday World & Splashin' Safari	Santa Claus, Indiana
Best Waterpark	4	Rulantica	Rust, Germany
Best Waterpark	5	Dollywood's Splash Country	Pigeon Forge, Tennessee
Best Family Park	1	Dutch Wonderland	Lancaster, Pennsylvania
Best Family Park	2	Paultons Park	Hampshire, England
Best Family Park	3	Story Land	Glen, New Hampshire
Best Family Park	4	Santa's Village	Jefferson, New Hampshire
Best Family Park	5	Legoland Florida	Winter Haven, Florida
Best Family Coaster	1	Big Bear Mountain	Dollywood
Best Family Coaster	2	Hiccup's Wing Gliders	Universal Epic Universe
Best Family Coaster	3	Bobcat	Six Flags Great Escape
Best Family Coaster	4	Mecalodon	Walibi Belgium
Best Family Coaster	4	Wooden Warrior	Quassy Amusement Park
Breakout Family Entertainment Center	1	The Funplex	Mount Laurel, New Jersey
Breakout Family Entertainment Center	2	Malibu Jacks	North Richland Hills, Texas
Breakout Family Entertainment Center	3	Meow Wolf Radio Tave	Houston, Texas
Breakout Family Entertainment Center	4	Sky Pirates of Mermaid Bay	Pigeon Forge, Tennessee
Breakout Family Entertainment Center	5	Speed Zone	Pigeon Forge, Tennessee
Most Beautiful Park	1	Busch Gardens Williamsburg	Williamsburg, Virginia
Most Beautiful Park	2	Europa-Park	Rust, Germany
Most Beautiful Park	3	Dollywood	Pigeon Forge, Tennessee
Most Beautiful Park	4	Efteling	Kaatsheuvel, The Netherlands
Most Beautiful Park	5	Tokyo DisneySea	Urayasu, Japan
Best Water Ride	1	Chiapas	Phantasialand
Best Water Ride	2	Valhalla	Blackpool Pleasure Beach
Best Water Ride	3	Jurassic World: The Ride	Universal Studios Hollywood
Best Water Ride	4	Mission Bermudes	Futuroscope
Best Water Ride	5	Dudley Do-Right's Ripsaw Falls	Universal Islands of Adventure
Best Kids' Area	1	Dollywood	Pigeon Forge, Tennessee
Best Kids' Area	2	Kings Island	Kings Mills, Ohio
Best Kids' Area	3	Universal Epic Universe	Orlando, Florida
Best Kids' Area	4	Efteling	Kaatsheuvel, The Netherlands
Best Kids' Area	5	Carowinds	Charlotte, North Carolina
Best New Show	1	Voodoo Dolls	Six Flags Fiesta Texas
Best New Show	2	Play On	Dollywood
Best New Show	3	Hide and Seek	Valleyfair
Best New Show	4	Holiday in the Sky	Holiday World & Splashin' Safari
Best New Show	5	Justice League - Rise of the Penguin	Parque Warner Madrid
Leadership Award	1	Keith James	RWS Global
Leadership Award	2	Ellis & Associates	Maitland, Florida
Leadership Award	3	Geoff Chutter	WhiteWater West
Leadership Award	4	Dave Andrews	Soaky Mountain
Leadership Award	5	Brett Sheridon	Roller
Best New Roller Coaster	1	Stardust Racers	Universal Epic Universe
Best New Roller Coaster	2	AlpenFury	Canada's Wonderland
Best New Roller Coaster	3	Siren's Curse	Cedar Point
Best New Roller Coaster	4	Top Thrill 2	Cedar Point
Best New Roller Coaster	5	Big Bad Wolf: The Wolf's Revenge	Busch Gardens Williamsburg
Best New Family Attraction	1	Danse Macabre	Efteling
Best New Family Attraction	2	Harry Potter and the Battle at the Ministry	Universal Epic Universe
Best New Family Attraction	3	Monsters Unchained: The Frankenstein Experiment	Universal Epic Universe
Best New Family Attraction	4	Mario Kart: Bowser's Challenge	Universal Epic Universe
Best New Family Attraction	5	Ghostly Manor	Paultons Park
Best New Water Park Ride	1	HydroMagnetic LIM Mammoth Water Coaster	Chimelong Paradise
Best New Water Park Ride	2	RiverRacers	Soak City (Kings Island)
Best New Water Park Ride	3	Rafter's Rage	Soaky Mountain
Best New Water Park Ride	4	Moosehorn Falls	Canada's Wonderland
Best New Water Park Ride	5	The Hive	Zoombezi Bay
Best New Attraction Installation	1	Harry Potter and the Battle at the Ministry	Universal Epic Universe
Best New Attraction Installation	2	Stardust Racers	Universal Epic Universe
Best New Attraction Installation	3	Danse Macabre	Efteling
Best New Attraction Installation	4	Constellation Carousel	Universal Epic Universe
Best New Attraction Installation	5	Joy's Happy Swing	Morgan's Wonderland
Best Guest Experience	1	Dollywood	Pigeon Forge, Tennessee
Best Guest Experience	2	Europa-Park	Rust, Germany
Best Guest Experience	3	Holiday World & Splashin' Safari	Santa Claus, Indiana
Best Guest Experience	4	Knoebels Amusement Resort	Elysburg, Pennsylvania
Best Guest Experience	5	Kings Island	Mason, Ohio
Best Dark Ride	1	Monsters Unchained: The Frankenstein Experiment	Universal Epic Universe
Best Dark Ride	2	Harry Potter and the Battle at the Ministry	Universal Epic Universe
Best Dark Ride	3	Star Wars: Rise of the Resistance	Disney's Hollywood Studios
Best Dark Ride	4	Pirates of the Caribbean: Battle for the Sunken Treasure	Shanghai Disneyland
Best Dark Ride	5	Symbolica	Efteling
Best Waterpark Ride	1	Mammoth	Splashin' Safari
Best Waterpark Ride	2	Wildebeest	Splashin' Safari
Best Waterpark Ride	3	Krakatau Aqua Coaster	Universal Volcano Bay Water Theme Park
Best Waterpark Ride	4	Master Blaster	Schlitterbahn
Best Waterpark Ride	5	The Falls	Schlitterbahn
Best Innovation	1	Rocking Boat, Mack Rides	Waldkirch, Germany
Best Innovation	2	Harry Potter and the Battle at the Ministry, Universal Epic Universe	Orlando, Florida
Best Innovation	3	Mine-Cart Madness, Universal Epic Universe	Orlando, Florida
Best Innovation	4	Top Thrill 2 and Lightning Coaster hardware, Zamperla	Vicenza, Italy
Best Innovation	5	Safety automation system, Roller	Austin, Texas
Best New Theme Concept	1	Dark Universe	Universal Epic Universe
Best New Theme Concept	2	Mine-Cart Madness/Donkey Kong Country	Universal Epic Universe/Universal Studios Japan
Best New Theme Concept	3	Siren's Curse	Cedar Point
Best New Theme Concept	4	Wizard of Oz precinct	Warner Bros. Movie World
Best New Theme Concept	5	Wrath of Rakshasa	Six Flags Great America

Top 50 Steel Roller Coasters
Rank	2025 Recipient	Park	Supplier	Year
1	Fury 325	Carowinds	B&M	2015
2	VelociCoaster	Universal Islands of Adventure	Intamin	2021
3	Steel Vengeance	Cedar Point	Dinn (rebuilt RMC)	1991 (rebuilt 2018)
4	Iron Gwazi	Busch Gardens Tampa Bay	GCI (rebuilt RMC)	1999 (rebuilt 2022)
5	Ride to Happiness	Plopsaland De Panne	Mack	2021
6	Millennium Force	Cedar Point	Intamin	2000
6	Zadra	Energylandia	Rocky Mountain Construction	2019
8	Taron	Phantasialand	Intamin	2016
9	Voltron Nevera	Europa-Park	Mack	2024
10	Expedition GeForce	Holiday Park	Intamin	2001
11	Phantom's Revenge	Kennywood	Arrow Dynamics (rebuilt Morgan)	1991 (rebuilt 2001)
12	Maverick	Cedar Point	Intamin	2007
13	ArieForce One	Fun Spot America Atlanta	RMC	2023
14	Apollo's Chariot	Busch Gardens Williamsburg	B&M	1999
15	Leviathan	Canada's Wonderland	B&M	2012
16	Superman the Ride	Six Flags New England	Intamin	2000
17	Stardust Racers	Universal Epic Universe	Mack	2025
18	Guardians of the Galaxy: Cosmic Rewind	Epcot	Vekoma	2022
19	Diamondback	Kings Island	B&M	2009
20	Kondaa	Walibi Belgium	Intamin	2020
21	Hyperion	Energylandia	Intamin	2018
22	Mako	SeaWorld Orlando	B&M	2016
23	Hagrid's Magical Creatures Motorbike Adventure	Universal Islands of Adventure	Intamin	2019
24	Pantherian	Kings Dominion	Intamin	2010
25	F.L.Y.	Phantasialand	Vekoma	2020
26	Iron Rattler	Six Flags Fiesta Texas	Rocky Mountain Construction	2013
27	Wildcat's Revenge	Hersheypark	Rocky Mountain Construction	2023
28	Helix	Liseberg	Mack Rides	2014
29	Time Traveler	Silver Dollar City	Mack	2018
30	Twisted Colossus	Six Flags Magic Mountain	Rocky Mountain Construction	2015
31	Lightning Rod	Dollywood	Rocky Mountain Construction	2016
32	Skyrush	Hersheypark	Intamin	2012
33	Nitro	Six Flags Great Adventure	B&M	2001
34	Magnum XL-200	Cedar Point	Arrow Dynamics	1989
35	Candymonium	Hersheypark	B&M	2020
36	Raging Bull	Six Flags Great America	B&M	1999
37	Big Bear Mountain	Dollywood	Vekoma	2023
38	Montu	Busch Gardens Tampa Bay	B&M	1996
39	Hyperia	Thorpe Park	Mack	2024
40	Taiga	Linnanmäki	Intamin	2019
41	Pantheon	Busch Gardens Williamsburg	Intamin	2022
41	X2	Six Flags Magic Mountain	Arrow	2002
43	Lech Coaster	Legendia	Vekoma	2017
44	Toutatis	Parc Astérix	Intamin	2023
45	Orion	Kings Island	B&M	2020
46	Banshee	Kings Island	B&M	2014
46	Batman Gotham City Escape	Parque Warner Madrid	Intamin	2023
48	Untamed	Walibi Holland	Rocky Mountain Construction	2019
49	Eejanaika	Fuji-Q Highland	S&S Worldwide	2006
49	Nemesis Reborn	Alton Towers	B&M	1994

Top 50 Wood Roller Coasters
Rank	2025 Recipient	Park	Supplier	Year
1	Phoenix	Knoebels Amusement Resort	PTC	1985
2	The Voyage	Holiday World & Splashin' Safari	The Gravity Group	2006
3	El Toro	Six Flags Great Adventure	Intamin	2006
4	The Beast	Kings Island		1979
5	Thunderhead	Dollywood	GCI	2004
6	Mystic Timbers	Kings Island	GCI	2017
7	GhostRider	Knott's Berry Farm	CCI	1998
8	Boulder Dash	Lake Compounce	CCI	2000
9	Ravine Flyer II	Waldameer & Water World	The Gravity Group	2008
10	Wodan - Timburcoaster	Europa-Park	GCI	2012
11	Outlaw Run	Silver Dollar City	RMC	2013
12	Wildfire	Kolmården Wildlife Park	RMC	2016
13	Balder	Liseberg	Intamin	2003
14	The Legend	Holiday World & Splashin' Safari	CCI	2000
15	Cyclone	Luna Park	Harry C. Baker	1927
16	Shivering Timbers	Michigan's Adventure	CCI	1998
17	Grizzly	Kings Dominion	Curtis D. Summers	1982
18	Joris en de Draak	Efteling	GCI	2010
19	Jack Rabbit	Kennywood	Harry C. Baker	1920
20	Gold Striker	California's Great America	GCI	2013
21	Boardwalk Bullet	Kemah Boardwalk	The Gravity Group and Martin & Vleminckx	2007
22	Prowler	Worlds of Fun	GCI	2009
23	Rutschebanen	Tivoli Gardens	Valdemar Lebech	1914
23	Troy	Toverland	GCI	2007
25	Twister	Knoebels Amusement Resort		1999
26	Goliath	Six Flags Great America	Rocky Mountain Construction	2014
27	Thunderbolt	Kennywood	Vettel / Miller	1968
28	Comet	The Great Escape	PTC	1994[
29	Lightning Racer	Hersheypark	Great Coasters International	2000
30	Colossos	Heide Park	Intamin	2001
31	Playland Wooden Coaster	Playland	Carl Phare/Walker LeRoy	1958
32	Zippin Pippin	Bay Beach Amusement Park	John Miller (rebuilt The Gravity Group)	1912 (rebuilt 2011)
33	Giant Dipper	Santa Cruz Beach Boardwalk	Arthur Looff	1924
34	Flying Turns	Knoebels Amusement Resort	Fetterman	2014
34	Texas Stingray	SeaWorld San Antonio	GCII	2020
36	Hades 360	Mount Olympus Theme Park	The Gravity Group	1995
37	The Raven	Holiday World & Splashin' Safari	CCI	1995
37	Wild One	Six Flags America	Dinn	1986
39	Wicker Man	Alton Towers	Great Coasters International	2018
40	White Lightning	Fun Spot America Orlando	GCII	2013
41	Cornball Express	Indiana Beach	Custom Coasters Inc.	1999
42	T Express	Everland	Intamin	2008
43	The Boss	Six Flags St. Louis	Custom Coasters Inc.	2000
44	Racer	Kennywood	Miller-Mach	1927
45	Racer	Kings Island	PTC - Allen	1985
46	The Cú Chulainn Coaster	Tayto Park	The Gravity Group	2015
46	Switchback	ZDT's Amusement Park	The Gravity Group	2015
48	El Toro	Freizeitpark Plohn	Great Coasters International	2009
49	Twister	Gröna Lund	The Gravity Group	2011
50	Renegade	Valleyfair	GCII	2007

=== 2024 winners ===
2024 Golden Ticket Awards
Host: Kennywood

The Amusement Today Golden Ticket Awards were announced on September 7, 2024.

Category	Rank	2024 Recipient	Location/Park
Best Park	1	Europa-Park	Rust, Germany
Best Park	2	Dollywood	Pigeon Forge, Tennessee
Best Park	3	Tokyo DisneySea	Urayasu, Japan
Best Park	4	Knoebels Amusement Resort	Elysburg, Pennsylvania
Best Park	5	Disneyland	Anaheim, California
Best Waterpark	1	Schlitterbahn	New Braunfels, Texas
Best Waterpark	2	Universal Volcano Bay Water Theme Park	Orlando, Florida
Best Waterpark	3	Holiday World & Splashin' Safari	Santa Claus, Indiana
Best Waterpark	4	Rulantica	Rust, Germany
Best Waterpark	5	Dollywood's Splash Country	Pigeon Forge, Tennessee
Best Family Park	1	Dutch Wonderland	Lancaster, Pennsylvania
Best Family Park	2	Santa's Village (Jefferson, New Hampshire)	Jefferson, New Hampshire
Best Family Park	3	Legoland Florida	Winter Haven, Florida
Best Family Park	4	Morgan's Wonderland	San Antonio, Texas
Best Family Park	5	Idlewild and Soak Zone	Ligonier, Pennsylvania
Best Family Coaster	1	Big Bear Mountain	Dollywood
Best Family Coaster	2	Good Gravy!	Holiday World & Splashin' Safari
Best Family Coaster	3	Slinky Dog Dash	Disney's Hollywood Studios
Best Family Coaster	4	Bobcat	Six Flags Great Escape
Best Family Coaster	5	Wooden Warrior	Quassy Amusement Park
Breakout Family Entertainment Center	1	Adventure Park USA	Monrovia, Maryland
Breakout Family Entertainment Center	2	Malibu Jacks Quad Cities	Bettendorf, Iowa
Breakout Family Entertainment Center	3	Craig's Cruisers	Wyoming, Michigan
Breakout Family Entertainment Center	4	The WWE Experience	Riyadh, Saudi Arabia
Breakout Family Entertainment Center	5	In The Game	Liberty Township, Ohio
Most Beautiful Park	1	Dollywood	Pigeon Forge, Tennessee
Most Beautiful Park	2	Busch Gardens Williamsburg	Williamsburg, Virginia
Most Beautiful Park	3	Europa-Park	Rust, Germany
Most Beautiful Park	5	Efteling	Kaatsheuvel, The Netherlands
Most Beautiful Park	5	Phantasialand	Brühl, Germany
Best Water Ride	1	Chiapas	Phantasialand
Best Water Ride	2	Valhalla	Blackpool Pleasure Beach
Best Water Ride	3	Timber Mountain Log Ride	Knott's Berry Farm
Best Water Ride	4	Dudley Do-Right's Ripsaw Falls	Universal Islands of Adventure
Best Water Ride	5	Jurassic World: The Ride	Universal Studios Hollywood
Best Kids' Area	1	Dollywood	Pigeon Forge, Tennessee
Best Kids' Area	5	Efteling	Kaatsheuvel, The Netherlands
Best Kids' Area	3	Kings Island	Kings Mills, Ohio
Best Kids' Area	4	Universal Studios Florida	Orlando, Florida
Best Kids' Area	5	Universal Islands of Adventure	Orlando, Florida
Best New Show	1	From The Heart	Dollywood
Best New Show	2	CineSational	Universal Orlando
Best New Show	3	Forever Hollywood	Six Flags Fiesta Texas
Best New Show	4	A Christmas Carol	Six Flags Fiesta Texas
Best New Show	5	Holidays In The Sky	Holiday World & Splashin' Safari
Leadership Award	1	Morgan's Wonderland	San Antonio, Texas
Leadership Award	2	Ellis & Associates	Maitland, Florida
Leadership Award	3	Adventureland	East Farmingdale, New York
Best New Roller Coaster	1	Voltron Nevera	Europa-Park
Best New Roller Coaster	2	Bobcat	Six Flags Great Escape
Best New Roller Coaster	3	Hyperia	Thorpe Park
Best New Roller Coaster	4	Good Gravy!	Holiday World & Splashin' Safari
Best New Roller Coaster	5	Primordial	Lagoon
Best New Family Attraction	1	Fire in the Hole	Silver Dollar City
Best New Family Attraction	2	Anna and Elsa's Frozen Journey	Tokyo DisneySea
Best New Family Attraction	3	Zootopia: Hot Pursuit	Shanghai Disneyland
Best New Family Attraction	4	Tiana's Bayou Adventure	Magic Kingdom
Best New Family Attraction	5	SpongeBob's Crazy Carnival Ride	Circus Circus Las Vegas
Best New Water Park Ride	1	Rise of Icarus	Mt. Olympus Water & Theme Park
Best New Water Park Ride	2	Icon Tower	Meryal Waterpark
Best New Water Park Ride	3	Kaleidoscope Kavern Lazy River	Wilderness at the Smokies
Best New Water Park Ride	4	Ridge Runner	Wilderness at the Smokies
Best New Water Park Ride	5	Eagle Hunt	Silverwood Theme Park
Best New Attraction Installation	1	Fire in the Hole	Silver Dollar City
Best New Attraction Installation	2	Voltron Nevera	Europa-Park
Best New Attraction Installation	3	Bobcat	Six Flags Great Escape
Best New Attraction Installation	4	Primordial	Lagoon
Best New Attraction Installation	5	Good Gravy!	Holiday World & Splashin' Safari
Best Guest Experience	1	Dollywood	Pigeon Forge, Tennessee
Best Guest Experience	2	Europa-Park	Rust, Germany
Best Guest Experience	3	Holiday World & Splashin' Safari	Santa Claus, Indiana
Best Guest Experience	4	Knoebels Amusement Resort	Elysburg, Pennsylvania
Best Guest Experience	5	Kings Island	Mason, Ohio
Best Dark Ride	1	Star Wars: Rise of the Resistance	Disney's Hollywood Studios
Best Dark Ride	2	Pirates of the Caribbean: Battle for the Sunken Treasure	Shanghai Disneyland
Best Dark Ride	3	Star Wars: Rise of the Resistance	Disneyland
Best Dark Ride	4	Guardians of the Galaxy – Mission: Breakout!	Disney California Adventure
Best Dark Ride	5	Jurassic World Adventure	Universal Beijing
Best Waterpark Ride	1	Wildebeest	Splashin' Safari
Best Waterpark Ride	2	Mammoth	Splashin' Safari
Best Waterpark Ride	4	Icon Tower	Meryal Water Park
Best Waterpark Ride	3	Krakatau Aqua Coaster	Universal Volcano Bay Water Theme Park
Best Waterpark Ride	5	Cheetah Chase	Splashin' Safari
Best Innovation	1	Audience participation in "Holidays in the Sky", Holiday World & Splashin' Safari	Santa Claus, Indiana
Best Innovation	2	Aurora Track-Mounted Lighting System, Skyline Attractions	Orlando, Florida
Best Innovation	3	Real Time Feedback Smart Codes, Real Time Feedback	Dallas, Texas
Best Innovation	4	DMT RideGuard, DMT Group	Essen, Germany
Best Innovation	5	Smart Pay, WhiteWater West and Vantage Technology	Richmond, Canada and Los Angeles, California
Best Food	1	Knoebels Amusement Resort	Elysburg, Pennsylvania
Best Food	2	Silver Dollar City	Branson, Missouri
Best Food	3	Epcot	Orlando, Florida
Best Food	4	Dollywood	Pigeon Forge, Tennessee
Best Food	5	Europa-Park	Rust, Germany
Best New Theme Concept	1	Good Gravy!	Holiday World & Splashin' Safari
Best New Theme Concept	2	Voltron Nevera	Europa Park
Best New Theme Concept	3	Iron Menace	Dorney Park & Wildwater Kingdom
Best New Theme Concept	4	Tiana's Bayou Adventure	Magic Kingdom and Disneyland
Best New Theme Concept	5	Primordial	Lagoon

Top 50 Steel Roller Coasters
Rank	2024 Recipient	Park	Supplier	Year
1	Fury 325	Carowinds	B&M	2015
2	VelociCoaster	Universal Islands of Adventure	Intamin	2021
3	Steel Vengeance	Cedar Point	Dinn (rebuilt RMC)	1991 (rebuilt 2018)
4	Millennium Force	Cedar Point	Intamin	2000
5	Iron Gwazi	Busch Gardens Tampa Bay	GCI (rebuilt RMC)	1999 (rebuilt 2022)
6	Taron	Phantasialand	Intamin	2016
7	Ride to Happiness	Plopsaland De Panne	Mack	2021
8	Zadra	Energylandia	Rocky Mountain Construction	2019
9	Expedition GeForce	Holiday Park	Intamin	2001
10	Maverick	Cedar Point	Intamin	2007
11	Voltron Nevera	Europa-Park	Mack	2024
12	Superman the Ride	Six Flags New England	Intamin	2000
13	Leviathan	Canada's Wonderland	B&M	2012
14	Project 305	Kings Dominion	Intamin	2010
15	Phantom's Revenge	Kennywood	Arrow Dynamics (rebuilt Morgan)	1991 (rebuilt 2001)
16	F.L.Y.	Phantasialand	Vekoma	2020
17	ArieForce One	Fun Spot America Atlanta	RMC	2023
18	Guardians of the Galaxy: Cosmic Rewind	Epcot	Vekoma	2022
19	Mako	SeaWorld Orlando	B&M	2016
20	Diamondback	Kings Island	B&M	2009
20	Iron Rattler	Six Flags Fiesta Texas	RCCA (rebuilt RMC)	1992 (rebuilt 2013)
20	Hagrid's Magical Creatures Motorbike Adventure	Universal Islands of Adventure	Intamin	2019
20	Lightning Rod	Dollywood	RMC	2016 (modified to steel coaster in 2021)
24	Hyperion	Energylandia	Intamin	2018
25	Apollo's Chariot	Busch Gardens Williamsburg	B&M	1999
26	Skyrush	Hersheypark	Intamin	2012
27	Candymonium	Hersheypark	B&M	2020
28	Kondaa	Walibi Belgium	Intamin	2021
29	Wildcat's Revenge	Hersheypark	Rocky Mountain Construction	2023
30	Time Traveler	Silver Dollar City	Mack	2018
30	Twisted Colossus	Six Flags Magic Mountain	Rocky Mountain Construction	2015
32	Big Bear Mountain	Dollywood	Vekoma	2023
32	X2	Six Flags Magic Mountain	Arrow	2002
34	Blue Fire	Europa-Park	Mack Rides	2009
34	Nitro	Six Flags Great Adventure	B&M	2001
36	Magnum XL-200	Cedar Point	Arrow Dynamics	1989
37	Nemesis Reborn	Alton Towers	B&M	1994
38	Banshee	Kings Island	B&M	2014
39	Montu	Busch Gardens Tampa Bay	B&M	1996
40	Helix	Liseberg	Mack Rides	2014
41	Alpengeist	Busch Gardens Williamsburg	B&M	1997
42	Untamed	Walibi Holland	Rocky Mountain Construction	2019
43	Orion	Kings Island	B&M	2020
44	Black Mamba	Phantasialand	B&M	2006
45	Lech Coaster	Legendia	Vekoma	2017
46	Goliath	Six Flags Over Georgia	B&M	2006
47	RailBlazer	California's Great America	Rocky Mountain Construction	2018
48	Toutatis	Parc Astérix	Intamin	2023
49	Thunder Striker	Carowinds	B&M	2018
50	Fønix	Fårup Sommerland	Vekoma	2022

Top 25 Wood Roller Coasters
Rank	2024 Recipient	Park	Supplier	Year
1	Phoenix	Knoebels Amusement Resort	PTC	1985
2	The Voyage	Holiday World & Splashin' Safari	The Gravity Group	2006
3	The Beast	Kings Island		1979
4	Thunderhead	Dollywood	GCI	2004
5	Mystic Timbers	Kings Island	GCI	2017
6	El Toro	Six Flags Great Adventure	Intamin	2006
7	Boulder Dash	Lake Compounce	CCI	2000
8	GhostRider	Knott's Berry Farm	CCI	1998
9	Wodan - Timburcoaster	Europa-Park	GCI	2012
10	Ravine Flyer II	Waldameer & Water World	The Gravity Group	2008
11	Outlaw Run	Silver Dollar City	RMC	2013
12	Cyclone	Luna Park	Harry C. Baker	1927
13	Balder	Liseberg	Intamin	2003
14	Gold Striker	California's Great America	GCI	2013
15	Joris en de Draak	Efteling	GCI	2010
16	Shivering Timbers	Michigan's Adventure	CCI	1998
17	Jack Rabbit	Kennywood	Harry C. Baker	1920
18	The Legend	Holiday World & Splashin' Safari	CCI	2000
19	Wildfire	Kolmården Wildlife Park	RMC	2016
20	Lightning Racer	Hersheypark	GCI	2000
21	Thunderbolt	Kennywood	John Miller (rebuilt Andy Vettel)	1924 (rebuilt 1968)
22	Troy	Toverland	GCI	2007
23	Prowler	Worlds of Fun	GCI	2009
24	Goliath (Six Flags Great America)	Six Flags Great America	RMC	2014
25	Boardwalk Bullet	Kemah Boardwalk	The Gravity Group and Martin & Vleminckx	2007
26	Texas Stingray	SeaWorld San Antonio	GCII	2020
27	Comet	The Great Escape	PTC	1994
28	Twister	Knoebels Amusement Resort		1999
29	Rutschebanen	Tivoli Gardens	L.A. Thompson	1914
30	Boardwalk Bullet	Kemah Boardwalk	The Gravity Group	2007
31	Flying Turns	Knoebels Amusement Resort	Fetterman	2014
32	Giant Dipper	Santa Cruz Beach Boardwalk	Arthur Looff	1924
33	Playland Wooden Coaster	Playland	Carl Phare/Walker LeRoy	1958
34	Colossos	Heide Park	Intamin	2001
35	The Raven	Holiday World & Splashin' Safari	CCI	1995
36	White Lightning	Fun Spot America Orlando	GCII	2013
37	Racer	Kennywood	Miller-Mach	1927
38	Heidi The Ride	Plopsaland De Panne	GCII	2017
39	Hades 360	Mount Olympus Theme Park	The Gravity Group	1995
40	Cornball Express	Indiana Beach	Custom Coasters Inc.	1999
41	Zippin Pippin	Bay Beach Amusement Park	John Miller (rebuilt The Gravity Group)	1912 (rebuilt 2011)
42	Racer	Kings Island	PTC - Allen	1985
43	Renegade	Valleyfair	GCII	2007
44	T Express	Everland	Intamin	2008
45	American Thunder	Six Flags St. Louis	GCII	2009
45	Bobcat	Great Escape	The Gravity Group	2024
45	Comet	Hersheypark	PTC / Schmeck	1946
48	The Cú Chulainn Coaster	Tayto Park	The Gravity Group	2015
49	Screamin' Eagle	Six Flags St. Louis	PTC	1976
50	Switchback	ZDT's Amusement Park	The Gravity Group	2015

=== 2023 winners ===
2023 Golden Ticket Awards
Host: Dollywood

The Amusement Today Golden Ticket Awards were announced on September 9, 2023.

Category	Rank	2023 Recipient	Location/Park
Best Park	1	Dollywood	Pigeon Forge, Tennessee
Best Park	2	Europa-Park	Rust, Germany
Best Park	3	Universal Islands of Adventure	Orlando, Florida
Best Park	4	Phantasialand	Brühl, Germany
Best Park	5	Kings Island	Mason, Ohio
Best Waterpark	1	Schlitterbahn	New Braunfels, Texas
Best Waterpark	2	Holiday World & Splashin' Safari	Santa Claus, Indiana
Best Waterpark	3	Universal Volcano Bay Water Theme Park	Orlando, Florida
Best Waterpark	4	Hyland Hills Water World	Federal Heights, Colorado
Best Waterpark	5	Aquatica Orlando	Orlando, Florida
Best Family Park	1	Dutch Wonderland	Lancaster, Pennsylvania
Best Family Park	2	Santa's Village (Jefferson, New Hampshire)	Jefferson, New Hampshire
Best Family Park	3	Story Land	Glen, New Hampshire
Best Family Park	4	Paultons Park	Romsey, England
Best Family Park	5	Legoland Florida	Winter Haven, Florida
Best Family Coaster	1	Big Bear Mountain	Dollywood
Best Family Coaster	2	Slinky Dog Dash	Disney's Hollywood Studios
Best Family Coaster	3	Freedom Flyer	Fun Spot America Orlando
Best Family Coaster	4	Wooden Warrior	Quassy Amusement Park
Best Family Coaster	5	Big Thunder Mountain Railroad	Disneyland Park (Paris)
Breakout Family Entertainment Center	1	Fun Land of Fredericksburg	Fredericksburg, Virginia
Breakout Family Entertainment Center	2	Meow Wolf: The Real Unreal	Grapevine, Texas
Breakout Family Entertainment Center	3	Scene75 Chicagoland	Romeoville, Illinois
Breakout Family Entertainment Center	4	Bolder	Grand Prairie, Texas
Breakout Family Entertainment Center	5	Malibu Jacks Lafayette	Lafayette, Indiana
Most Beautiful Park	1	Busch Gardens Williamsburg	Williamsburg, Virginia
Most Beautiful Park	2	Dollywood	Pigeon Forge, Tennessee
Most Beautiful Park	3	Europa-Park	Rust, Germany
Most Beautiful Park	4	Tokyo DisneySea	Tokyo, Japan
Most Beautiful Park	5	Efteling	Kaatsheuvel, The Netherlands
Best Water Ride	1	Valhalla	Blackpool Pleasure Beach
Best Water Ride	2	Dudley Do-Right's Ripsaw Falls	Universal Islands of Adventure
Best Water Ride	3	Chiapas	Phantasialand
Best Water Ride	4	Timber Mountain Log Ride	Knott's Berry Farm
Best Water Ride	5	Aquaman: Power Wave	Six Flags Over Texas
Best Kids' Area	1	Dollywood	Pigeon Forge, Tennessee
Best Kids' Area	2	Kings Island	Kings Mills, Ohio
Best Kids' Area	3	Canada's Wonderland	Vaughan, Ontario, Canada
Best Kids' Area	4	Universal Islands of Adventure	Orlando, Florida
Best Kids' Area	5	Carowinds	Charlotte, North Carolina
Best Halloween Event of 2022	1	Universal's Halloween Horror Nights	Orlando, Florida
Best Halloween Event of 2022	2	Knott's Berry Farm	Buena Park, California
Best Halloween Event of 2022	3	Universal's Halloween Horror Nights	Universal City, California
Best Halloween Event of 2022	4	Six Flags Fiesta Texas	San Antonio, Texas
Best Halloween Event of 2022	5	Europa-Park	Rust, Germany
Best New Show	1	Le Mime et l'Étoile	Puy du Fou
Best New Show	2	Summerbration	Cedar Point
Best New Show	3	El Misterio de Sorbaces	Puy du Fou España
Best New Show	4	Wake the Dead	Cedar Point
Best New Show	5	Hot Time in Rivertown	Silver Dollar City
Best New Show	5	Retrospect	Carowinds
Best New Roller Coaster	1	Wildcat's Revenge	Hersheypark
Best New Roller Coaster	2	ArieForce One	Fun Spot America Atlanta
Best New Roller Coaster	3	Big Bear Mountain	
Best New Roller Coaster	4	Toutatis	Parc Astérix
Best New Roller Coaster	5	Zambezi Zinger	Worlds of Fun
Best New Family Attraction	1	Mario Kart: Bowser's Challenge	Universal Studios Hollywood
Best New Family Attraction	2	Mickey & Minnie's Runaway Railway	Disneyland
Best New Family Attraction	3	Draken Falls	Adventureland (Iowa)
Best New Family Attraction	4	Yuta Falls	Lost Island Theme Park
Best New Family Attraction	5	Treasure Hunt: The Ride	Monterey, California
Best New Water Park Ride	1	Rocket Blast	Waldameer & Water World
Best New Water Park Ride	2	Riptide Racer	Water Country USA
Best New Water Park Ride	3	Vikingløp	Rulantica
Best New Water Park Ride	4	Turtle Coaster	Land of Legends Theme Park
Best New Water Park Ride	5	Lightspeed Shuttle	Studio City (Macau)
Best New Attraction Installation	1	ArieForce One	Fun Spot America Atlanta
Best New Attraction Installation	2	Mario Kart: Bowser's Challenge	Universal Studios Hollywood
Best New Attraction Installation	3	Toutatis	Parc Astérix
Best New Attraction Installation	4	Leviathan	Sea World
Best New Attraction Installation	5	Big Bear Mountain	Dollywood
Best Guest Experience	1	Dollywood	Pigeon Forge, Tennessee
Best Guest Experience	2	Knoebels Amusement Resort	Elysburg, Pennsylvania
Best Guest Experience	3	Holiday World & Splashin' Safari	Santa Claus, Indiana
Best Guest Experience	4	Europa-Park	Rust, Germany
Best Guest Experience	5	Silver Dollar City	Branson, Missouri
Best Dark Ride	1	Star Wars: Rise of the Resistance	Disney's Hollywood Studios
Best Dark Ride	2	Haunted Mansion	Knoebels Amusement Resort
Best Dark Ride	3	Volkanu: Quest for the Golden Idol	Lost Island Theme Park
Best Dark Ride	4	Guardians of the Galaxy – Mission: Breakout!	Disney California Adventure
Best Dark Ride	5	Harry Potter and the Escape from Gringotts	Universal Studios Florida
Best Waterpark Ride	1	Mammoth	Splashin' Safari
Best Waterpark Ride	2	Wildebeest	Splashin' Safari
Best Waterpark Ride	3	Krakatau Aqua Coaster	Universal Volcano Bay Water Theme Park
Best Waterpark Ride	4	Lost River of the Pharaohs	Hyland Hills Water World
Best Waterpark Ride	5	Cheetah Chase	Splashin' Safari
Best Innovation	1	208 ReTraK, Rocky Mountain Construction	Hayden, Idaho
Best Innovation	2	Eatrenalin, Europa Park	Rust, Germany
Best Innovation	3	Surf Coaster, Bolliger & Mabillard	Monthey, Switzerland
Best Innovation	4	StaCool Vest Core Body Cooling System, StaCool Industries	Lecanto, Florida
Best Innovation	5	eSix Gaming, Six Flags Fiesta Texas	San Antonio, Texas
Best Innovation	6	Quick Six/Just Walk Out, Amazon at Six Flags Great Adventure	Jackson Township, New Jersey
Best Innovation	7	Belt Assisted Transport, Sunkid GmbH	Bassenheim, Germany
Best Innovation	8	Perfect Pour	
Best Food	1	Knoebels Amusement Resort	Elysburg, Pennsylvania
Best Food	2	Dollywood	Pigeon Forge, Tennessee
Best Food	3	Silver Dollar City	Branson, Missouri
Best Food	4	Epcot	Orlando, Florida
Best Food	5	Europa-Park	Rust, Germany
Best Christmas Event of 2022	1	Dollywood	Pigeon Forge, Tennessee
Best Christmas Event of 2022	2	Silver Dollar City	Branson, Missouri
Best Christmas Event of 2022	3	Magic Kingdom	Bay Lake, Florida
Best Christmas Event of 2022	4	Kings Dominion	Doswell, Virginia
Best Christmas Event of 2022	5	Busch Gardens Williamsburg	Williamsburg, Virginia
Best Christmas Event of 2022	5	Europa-Park	Rust, Germany

Top 50 Steel Roller Coasters
Rank	2023 Recipient	Park	Supplier	Year
1	Fury 325	Carowinds	B&M	2015
2	Millennium Force	Cedar Point	Intamin	2000
3	VelociCoaster	Universal Islands of Adventure	Intamin	2021
4	Steel Vengeance	Cedar Point	Dinn (rebuilt RMC)	1991 (rebuilt 2018)
5	Iron Gwazi	Busch Gardens Tampa Bay	GCI (rebuilt RMC)	1999 (rebuilt 2022)
6	Expedition GeForce	Holiday Park	Intamin	2001
7	Superman the Ride	Six Flags New England	Intamin	2000
8	Taron	Phantasialand	Intamin	2016
9	Intimidator 305	Kings Dominion	Intamin	2010
9	Maverick	Cedar Point	Intamin	2007
11	Apollo's Chariot	Busch Gardens Williamsburg	B&M	1999
12	Phantom's Revenge	Kennywood	Arrow Dynamics (rebuilt Morgan)	1991 (rebuilt 2001)
13	Leviathan	Canada's Wonderland	B&M	2012
14	Lightning Rod	Dollywood	RMC	2016 (modified to steel coaster in 2021)
15	Iron Rattler	Six Flags Fiesta Texas	RCCA (rebuilt RMC)	1992 (rebuilt 2013)
15	Thunder Striker (as Intimidator)	Carowinds	B&M	2010
17	Mako	SeaWorld Orlando	B&M	2016
18	Helix	Liseberg	Mack	2014
19	Hagrid's Magical Creatures Motorbike Adventure	Universal Islands of Adventure	Intamin	2019
20	Nitro	Six Flags Great Adventure	B&M	2001
21	X2	Six Flags Magic Mountain	Arrow Dynamics	2001
22	Time Traveler	Silver Dollar City	Mack Rides	2018
23	Guardians of the Galaxy: Cosmic Rewind	Epcot	Vekoma	2022
24	Candymonium	Hersheypark	B&M	2020
25	ArieForce One	Fun Spot America Atlanta	RMC	2023
26	Diamondback	Kings Island	B&M	2009
27	Orion	Kings Island	B&M	2020
28	Twisted Colossus	Six Flags Magic Mountain	Rocky Mountain Construction	2015
29	Skyrush	Hersheypark	Intamin	2012
30	Magnum XL-200	Cedar Point	Arrow Dynamics	1989
31	Ride to Happiness	Plopsaland De Panne	Mack	2021
32	Zadra	Energylandia	RMC	2019
33	Fønix	Fårup Sommerland	Vekoma	2022
34	Montu	Busch Gardens Tampa Bay	B&M	1996
35	Nemesis	Alton Towers	B&M	1994
36	Steel Curtain	Kennywood	S&S	2019
37	Big Bear Mountain	Dollywood	Vekoma	2023
38	New Texas Giant	Six Flags Over Texas	Dinn (rebuilt RMC)	1990 (rebuilt 2011)
39	Blue Fire	Europa-Park	Mack Rides	2009
40	Wildcat's Revenge	Hersheypark	Rocky Mountain Construction	2023
41	Banshee	Kings Island	B&M	2014
41	Riddler Mindbender	Six Flags Over Georgia	Schwarzkopf	1978
43	Steel Dragon 2000	Nagashima Spa Land	Morgan	2000
43	Twisted Timbers	Kings Dominion	International Coasters, Inc. (rebuilt RMC)	1994 (rebuilt 2018)
45	Goliath	Six Flags Over Georgia	B&M	2006
46	F.L.Y.	Phantasialand	Vekoma	2020
47	Cheetah Hunt	Busch Gardens Tampa Bay	Intamin	2011
48	Alpengeist	Busch Gardens Williamsburg	B&M	1997
49	Pantheon	Busch Gardens Williamsburg	Intamin	2022
50	Black Mamba	Phantasialand	B&M	2006

Top 50 Wood Roller Coasters
Rank	2023 Recipient	Park	Supplier	Year
1	Phoenix	Knoebels Amusement Resort	PTC	1985
2	The Voyage	Holiday World & Splashin' Safari	The Gravity Group	2006
3	El Toro	Six Flags Great Adventure	Intamin	2006
4	Thunderhead	Dollywood	GCI	2004
5	Boulder Dash	Lake Compounce	CCI	2000
6	The Beast	Kings Island		1979
7	Mystic Timbers	Kings Island	GCI	2017
8	Ravine Flyer II	Waldameer & Water World	The Gravity Group	2008
9	GhostRider	Knott's Berry Farm	CCI	1998
10	Outlaw Run	Silver Dollar City	RMC	2013
11	Balder	Liseberg	Intamin	2003
12	Gold Striker	California's Great America	GCI	2013
13	Wildfire	Kolmården Wildlife Park	RMC	2016
14	Wodan - Timburcoaster	Europa-Park	GCI	2012
15	Jack Rabbit	Kennywood	Harry C. Baker	1921
16	Cyclone	Luna Park	Harry C. Baker	1927
17	Shivering Timbers	Michigan's Adventure	CCI	1998
18	Thunderbolt	Kennywood	John Miller (rebuilt Andy Vettel)	1924 (rebuilt 1968)
19	Troy	Toverland	GCI	2007
20	Rutschebanen	Tivoli Gardens	LaMarcus Adna Thompson	1914
21	The Legend	Holiday World & Splashin' Safari	CCI	2000
22	Lightning Racer	Hersheypark	GCI	2000
23	Flying Turns	Knoebels		2014
24	Prowler	Worlds of Fun	GCI	2009
25	The Comet	The Great Escape	PTC	1994
26	The Raven	Holiday World & Splashin' Safari	CCI	1995
27	Colossos	Heide Park	Intamin	2001
27	Twister	Knoebels Amusement Resort		1999
29	Giant Dipper	Santa Cruz Beach Boardwalk	Arthur Looff	1924
30	Boardwalk Bullet	Kemah Boardwalk	The Gravity Group	2007
30	Playland Wooden Coaster	Playland	Carl Phare/Walker LeRoy	1958
32	Goliath	Six Flags Great America	RMC	2014
33	Texas Stingray	SeaWorld San Antonio	GCII	2020
34	White Lightning	Fun Spot America Orlando	GCII	2013
35	Rampage	Alabama Splash Adventure	CCI	1998
36	The Cú Chulainn Coaster	Tayto Park	The Gravity Group	2015
37	Renegade	Valleyfair	GCII	2007
38	T Express	Everland	Intamin	2008
39	Boss	Six Flags St. Louis	CCI	2000
40	Screamin' Eagle	Six Flags St. Louis	PTC	1976
41	Racer	Kennywood	Miller-Mach	1927
42	Cornball Express	Indiana Beach	Custom Coasters Inc.	1999
42	Grizzly	Kings Dominion	KECO	1982
44	Hades 360	Mount Olympus Theme Park	The Gravity Group	1995
45	InvadR	Busch Gardens Williamsburg	GCII	2017
45	Viper	Six Flags Great America		1995
47	Wicker Man	Alton Towers	Great Coasters International	2018
48	Zippin Pippin	Bay Beach Amusement Park	John Miller (rebuilt The Gravity Group)	1912 (rebuilt 2011)
49	Comet	Hersheypark	PTC / Schmeck	1946
50	Switchback	ZDT's Amusement Park	The Gravity Group	2015

=== 2022 winners ===
2022 Golden Ticket Awards
Hosts: Six Flags Fiesta Texas and Morgan's Wonderland

The Amusement Today Golden Ticket Awards were announced on September 10, 2022.

Category	Rank	2022 Recipient	Location/Park
Best Park	1	Europa-Park	Rust, Germany
Best Park	2	Dollywood	Pigeon Forge, Tennessee
Best Park	3	Phantasialand	Brühl, Germany
Best Park	4	Universal's Islands of Adventure	Orlando, Florida
Best Park	5	Silver Dollar City	Branson, Missouri
Best Waterpark	1	Schlitterbahn	New Braunfels, Texas
Best Waterpark	2	Holiday World & Splashin' Safari	Santa Claus, Indiana
Best Waterpark	3	Hyland Hills Water World	Federal Heights, Colorado
Best Waterpark	4	Universal's Volcano Bay Water Theme Park	Orlando, Florida
Best Waterpark	5	Perfect Day at CocoCay	The Bahamas
Best Family Park	1	Dutch Wonderland	Lancaster, Pennsylvania
Best Family Park	2	Santa's Village (Jefferson, New Hampshire)	Jefferson, New Hampshire
Best Family Park	3	Paultons Park	Romsey, England
Best Family Park	4	Legoland Florida	Winter Haven, Florida
Best Family Park	5	Story Land	Glen, New Hampshire
Best Wildlife/Marine Park	1	SeaWorld Orlando	Orlando, Florida
Best Wildlife/Marine Park	2	Busch Gardens Tampa Bay	Tampa, Florida
Best Wildlife/Marine Park	3	Disney's Animal Kingdom	Orlando, Florida
Best Wildlife/Marine Park	4	Discovery Cove	Orlando, Florida
Best Wildlife/Marine Park	5	Ocean Park Hong Kong	Hong Kong
Breakout Family Entertainment Center	1	Meow Wolf Convergence Station	Denver, Colorado
Breakout Family Entertainment Center	2	Funplex Myrtle Beach	Myrtle Beach, South Carolina
Breakout Family Entertainment Center	3	Funplex Mount Laurel	Mount Laurel, New Jersey
Breakout Family Entertainment Center	4	Elev8 Fun	Sanford, Florida
Breakout Family Entertainment Center	5	Shepherd of the Hills	Branson, Missouri
Most Beautiful Park	1	Busch Gardens Williamsburg	Williamsburg, Virginia
Most Beautiful Park	2	Dollywood	Pigeon Forge, Tennessee
Most Beautiful Park	3	Efteling	Kaatsheuvel, The Netherlands
Most Beautiful Park	4	Europa-Park	Rust, Germany
Most Beautiful Park	5	Gilroy Gardens	Gilroy, California
Best Water Ride	1	Chiapas	Phantasialand
Best Water Ride	2	Mystic River Falls	Silver Dollar City
Best Water Ride	3	Dudley Do-Right's Ripsaw Falls	Universal's Islands of Adventure
Best Water Ride	4	Timber Mountain Log Ride	Knott's Berry Farm
Best Water Ride	5	Splash Mountain	Magic Kingdom
Best Kids' Area	1	Dollywood	Pigeon Forge, Tennessee
Best Kids' Area	2	Kings Island	Kings Mills, Ohio
Best Kids' Area	3	Knott's Berry Farm	Buena Park, California
Best Kids' Area	4	Efteling	Kaatsheuvel, The Netherlands
Best Kids' Area	5	Paultons Park	Romsey, Hampshire, England, United Kingdom
Best Halloween Event of 2021	1	Universal's Halloween Horror Nights	Orlando, Florida
Best Halloween Event of 2021	2	Knott's Berry Farm	Buena Park, California
Best Halloween Event of 2021	3	Six Flags Fiesta Texas	San Antonio, Texas
Best Halloween Event of 2021	4	Universal's Halloween Horror Nights	Universal City, California
Best Halloween Event of 2021	5	Busch Gardens Tampa Bay	Tampa, Florida
Best New Show	1	Christmas at the Southern Palace	Six Flags Over Texas
Best New Show	2	Fun, Fireworks, and Fifty	Kings Island
Best New Show	3	Come See About Me	Cedar Point
Best New Roller Coaster	1	Iron Gwazi	Busch Gardens Tampa Bay
Best New Roller Coaster	2	Guardians of the Galaxy: Cosmic Rewind	Epcot
Best New Roller Coaster	3	Ice Breaker	SeaWorld Orlando
Best New Roller Coaster	4	Pantheon	Busch Gardens Williamsburg
Best New Roller Coaster	5	Dr. Diabolical's Cliffhanger	Six Flags Fiesta Texas
Best New Family Attraction	1	Volkanu: Quest for the Golden Idol	Lost Island Theme Park
Best New Family Attraction	2	Remy's Ratatouille Adventure	Epcot
Best New Family Attraction	3	Pirates of Speelunker Cave	Six Flags Over Texas
Best New Family Attraction	4	Jumanji - The Adventure	Gardaland
Best New Family Attraction	5	Chasseurs de Tornades	Futuroscope
Best New Water Park Ride	1	Medusa's Slidewheel	Mt. Olympus Water & Theme Park
Best New Water Park Ride	2	Rocket Rapids	Quassy Amusement Park
Best New Water Park Ride	3	Riptide Racer	Aquatica San Antonio
Best New Water Park Ride	4	The Edge	Soaky Mountain
Best New Water Park Ride	5	Rapids Racer	Adventure Island
Best New Attraction Installation	1	Guardians of the Galaxy: Cosmic Rewind	Epcot
Best New Attraction Installation	2	Kangaroo	Kennywood
Best New Attraction Installation	3	Dr. Diabolical's Cliffhanger	Six Flags Fiesta Texas
Best New Attraction Installation	4	Volkanu: Quest for the Golden Idol	Lost Island Theme Park
Best New Attraction Installation	5	Fireball	Adventureland
Best Guest Experience	1	Dollywood	Pigeon Forge, Tennessee
Best Guest Experience	2	Knoebels Amusement Resort	Elysburg, Pennsylvania
Best Guest Experience	3	Holiday World & Splashin' Safari	Santa Claus, Indiana
Best Guest Experience	4	Kings Island	Mason, Ohio
Best Guest Experience	5	Europa-Park	Rust, Germany
Best Dark Ride	1	Star Wars: Rise of the Resistance	Disney's Hollywood Studios
Best Dark Ride	2	Pirates of the Caribbean: Battle for the Sunken Treasure	Shanghai Disneyland
Best Dark Ride	3	Haunted Mansion	Knoebels Amusement Resort
Best Dark Ride	4	Indiana Jones Adventure: Temple of the Forbidden Eye	Disneyland
Best Dark Ride	5	Harry Potter and the Escape from Gringotts	Universal Studios Florida
Best Waterpark Ride	1	Wildebeest	Splashin' Safari
Best Waterpark Ride	2	Krakatau Aqua Coaster	Universal's Volcano Bay Water Theme Park
Best Waterpark Ride	3	Voyage to the Center of the Earth	Hyland Hills Water World
Best Waterpark Ride	4	Master Blaster	Schlitterbahn
Best Waterpark Ride	5	Medusa's Slidewheel	Mt. Olympus Water & Theme Park
Best Innovation	1	VLocker	Loganholme, Australia
Best Innovation	2	Competency Management, Mobaro	Viby J, Denmark
Best Innovation	3	Cooking Oil Micro-Filtration, Filta	Toronto, Ontario
Best Innovation	4	EVENTS Software System, Embed	Singapore
Best Innovation	5	NinjaCross Systems	Overland Park, Kansas
Best Innovation	6	Stern Insider, Stern Pinball	Elk Grove Village, Illinois
Best Food	1	Knoebels Amusement Resort	Elysburg, Pennsylvania
Best Food	2	Dollywood	Pigeon Forge, Tennessee
Best Food	3	Silver Dollar City	Branson, Missouri
Best Food	4	Epcot	Orlando, Florida
Best Food	5	Europa-Park	Rust, Germany
Best Christmas Event of 2021	1	Dollywood	Pigeon Forge, Tennessee
Best Christmas Event of 2021	2	Silver Dollar City	Branson, Missouri
Best Christmas Event of 2021	3	Give Kids the World Village	Kissimmee, Florida
Best Christmas Event of 2021	4	Carowinds	Charlotte, North Carolina
Best Christmas Event of 2021	5	Six Flags Magic Mountain	Valencia, California

Top 50 Steel Roller Coasters
Rank	2022 Recipient	Park	Supplier	Year
1	Fury 325	Carowinds	B&M	2015
2	Steel Vengeance	Cedar Point	Dinn (rebuilt RMC)	1991 (rebuilt 2018)
3	Millennium Force	Cedar Point	Intamin	2000
4	Iron Gwazi	Busch Gardens Tampa Bay	GCI (rebuilt RMC)	1999 (rebuilt 2022)
5	VelociCoaster	Universal's Islands of Adventure	Intamin	2021
6	Expedition GeForce	Holiday Park	Intamin	2001
7	Superman the Ride	Six Flags New England	Intamin	2000
8	Apollo's Chariot	Busch Gardens Williamsburg	B&M	1999
9	Intimidator 305	Kings Dominion	Intamin	2010
10	Maverick	Cedar Point	Intamin	2007
11	Lightning Rod	Dollywood	RMC	2016 (modified to steel coaster in 2021)
12	Taron	Phantasialand	Intamin	2016
13	Phantom's Revenge	Kennywood	Arrow Dynamics (rebuilt Morgan)	1991 (rebuilt 2001)
14	Iron Rattler	Six Flags Fiesta Texas	RCCA (rebuilt RMC)	1992 (rebuilt 2013)
15	Leviathan	Canada's Wonderland	B&M	2012
16	Mako	SeaWorld Orlando	B&M	2016
17	Diamondback	Kings Island	B&M	2009
18	Twisted Colossus	Six Flags Magic Mountain	International Amusement Devices (rebuilt RMC)	1978 (rebuilt 2015)
19	Candymonium	Hersheypark	B&M	2020
20	Orion	Kings Island	B&M	2020
21	Nitro	Six Flags Great Adventure	B&M	2001
22	Time Traveler	Silver Dollar City	Mack Rides	2018
23	Skyrush	Hersheypark	Intamin	2012
24	Hagrid's Magical Creatures Motorbike Adventure	Universal's Islands of Adventure	Intamin	2019
25	Magnum XL-200	Cedar Point	Arrow Dynamics	1989
26	Zadra	Energylandia	RMC	2019
27	Intimidator	Carowinds	B&M	2018
28	Riddler Mindbender	Six Flags Over Georgia	Schwarzkopf	1978
29	Montu	Busch Gardens Tampa Bay	B&M	1996
30	Helix	Liseberg	Mack Rides	2014
31	Nemesis	Alton Towers	B&M	1994
32	X2	Six Flags Magic Mountain	Arrow Dynamics	2002
33	Blue Fire	Europa-Park	Mack Rides	2009
34	Behemoth	Canada's Wonderland	B&M	2008
35	Steel Curtain	Kennywood	S&S	2019
36	Alpengeist	Busch Gardens Williamsburg	B&M	1997
37	Banshee	Kings Island	B&M	2014
38	Raging Bull	Six Flags Great America	B&M	1999
39	Ride to Happiness	Plopsaland De Panne	Mack	2021
40	Twisted Timbers	Kings Dominion	International Coasters, Inc. (rebuilt RMC)	1994 (rebuilt 2018)
41	Goliath	Six Flags Over Georgia	B&M	2006
42	New Texas Giant	Six Flags Over Texas	Dinn (rebuilt RMC)	1990 (rebuilt 2011)
43	Pantheon	Busch Gardens Williamsburg	Intamin	2022
44	Black Mamba	Phantasialand	B&M	2006
45	Wicked Cyclone	Six Flags New England	Frontier Construction (rebuilt RMC)	1983 (rebuilt 2015)
46	Steel Dragon 2000	Nagashima Spa Land	Morgan	2000
47	Shock Wave	Six Flags Over Texas	Schwarzkopf	1978
48	Jetline	Gröna Lund	Zierer	1988
49	Shambhala	PortAventura Park	B&M	2012
50	Whizzer	Six Flags Great America	Schwarzkopf	1976

Top 25 Wood Roller Coasters
Rank	2022 Recipient	Park	Supplier	Year
1	Phoenix	Knoebels Amusement Resort	PTC	1985
2	The Voyage	Holiday World & Splashin' Safari	The Gravity Group	2006
3	El Toro	Six Flags Great Adventure	Intamin	2006
4	Boulder Dash	Lake Compounce	CCI	2000
5	The Beast	Kings Island		1979
6	Mystic Timbers	Kings Island	GCI	2017
7	Ravine Flyer II	Waldameer & Water World	The Gravity Group	2008
8	GhostRider	Knott's Berry Farm	CCI	1998
9	Outlaw Run	Silver Dollar City	RMC	2013
10	Thunderhead	Dollywood	GCI	2004
11	Gold Striker	California's Great America	GCI	2013
12	Jack Rabbit	Kennywood	Harry C. Baker	1921
13	Wodan - Timburcoaster	Europa-Park	GCI	2012
14	Lightning Racer	Hersheypark	GCI	2000
15	Wildfire	Kolmården Wildlife Park	RMC	2016
16	Troy	Toverland	GCI	2007
17	Cyclone	Luna Park	Harry C. Baker	1927
18	Balder	Liseberg	Intamin	2003
19	Shivering Timbers	Michigan's Adventure	CCI	1998
20	Thunderbolt	Kennywood	John Miller (rebuilt Andy Vettel)	1924 (rebuilt 1968)
21	Boardwalk Bullet	Kemah Boardwalk	Martin & Vleminckx	2007
22	The Legend	Holiday World & Splashin' Safari	CCI	2000
23	The Comet	The Great Escape	PTC	1994
24	The Raven	Holiday World & Splashin' Safari	CCI	1995
25	Colossos	Heide Park	Intamin	2001
26	Goliath	Six Flags Great America	RMC	2014
27	Texas Stingray	SeaWorld San Antonio	GCII	2020
28	Flying Turns	Knoebels Amusement Resort		2013
29	Playland Wooden Coaster	Playland	Carl Phare/Walker LeRoy	1958
30	Prowler	Worlds of Fun	GCII	2009
31	Giant Dipper	Santa Cruz Beach Boardwalk	Arthur Looff	1924
31	Twister	Knoebels Amusement Resort		1999
33	The Cú Chulainn Coaster	Tayto Park	The Gravity Group	2015
33	Racer	Kennywood	Miller-Mach	1927
33	Renegade	Valleyfair	GCII	2007
36	Rampage	Alabama Splash Adventure	CCI	1998
37	White Lightning	Fun Spot America Orlando	GCII	2013
38	Screamin' Eagle	Six Flags St. Louis	PTC	1976
39	T Express	Everland	Intamin	2008
40	Rutschebanen	Tivoli Gardens	Valdemar Lebech	1914
41	Blue Streak	Cedar Point	PTC	1964
41	Zippin Pippin	Bay Beach Amusement Park	John Miller (rebuilt The Gravity Group)	1912 (rebuilt 2011)
43	The Boss	Six Flags St. Louis	CCI	2000
44	Cornball Express	Indiana Beach	CCI	2001
45	InvadR	Busch Gardens Williamsburg	GCII	2017
46	Switchback	ZDT's Amusement Park	The Gravity Group	2015
47	Hades 360	Mount Olympus Theme Park	The Gravity Group	1995
48	Tremors	Silverwood	CCI	1999
49	American Thunder	Six Flags St. Louis	GCII	2009
50	Joris en de Draak	Efteling	Great Coasters International	2010

=== 2021 winners ===
2021 Golden Ticket Awards
Host: National Roller Coaster Museum and Archives

The Amusement Today Golden Ticket Awards were announced on September 9, 2021.

Category	Rank	2021 Recipient	Location/Park
Best Park	1	Europa-Park	Rust, Germany
Best Park	2	Dollywood	Pigeon Forge, Tennessee
Best Park	3	Universal's Islands of Adventure	Orlando, Florida
Best Park	4	Knoebels Amusement Resort	Elysburg, Pennsylvania
Best Park	5	Cedar Point	Sandusky, Ohio
Best Waterpark	1	Schlitterbahn	New Braunfels, Texas
Best Waterpark	2	Holiday World & Splashin' Safari	Santa Claus, Indiana
Best Waterpark	3	Rulantica	Rust, Germany
Best Waterpark	4	Universal's Volcano Bay Water Theme Park	Orlando, Florida
Best Waterpark	5	Hyland Hills Water World	Federal Heights, Colorado
Best Family Park	1	Dutch Wonderland	Lancaster, Pennsylvania
Best Family Park	2	Paultons Park	Romsey, England
Best Family Park	3	Idlewild and Soak Zone	Ligonier, Pennsylvania
Best Family Park	4	Santa's Village (Jefferson, New Hampshire)	Jefferson, New Hampshire
Best Family Park	5	Sesame Place	Langhorne, Pennsylvania
Best Wildlife/Marine Park	1	SeaWorld Orlando	Orlando, Florida
Best Wildlife/Marine Park	2	Busch Gardens Tampa Bay	Tampa, Florida
Best Wildlife/Marine Park	3	Disney's Animal Kingdom	Orlando, Florida
Best Wildlife/Marine Park	4	Discovery Cove	Orlando, Florida
Best Wildlife/Marine Park	5	SeaWorld San Diego	San Diego, California
Breakout Family Entertainment Center	1	Fun Spot America Atlanta	Fayetteville, Georgia
Breakout Family Entertainment Center	2	Funplex Myrtle Beach	Myrtle Beach, South Carolina
Breakout Family Entertainment Center	3	Scene75 Entertainment Center	Dayton, Ohio
Breakout Family Entertainment Center	4	Austin's	Pflugerville, Texas
Breakout Family Entertainment Center	5	Scene75 Entertainment Center	Columbus, Ohio
Most Beautiful Park	1	Dollywood	Pigeon Forge, Tennessee
Most Beautiful Park	2	Efteling	Kaatsheuvel, The Netherlands
Most Beautiful Park	3	Busch Gardens Williamsburg	Williamsburg, Virginia
Most Beautiful Park	4	Europa-Park	Rust, Germany
Most Beautiful Park	5	Gilroy Gardens	Gilroy, California
Best Water Ride	1	Valhalla	Blackpool Pleasure Beach
Best Water Ride	2	Mystic River Falls	Silver Dollar City
Best Water Ride	3	Dudley Do-Right's Ripsaw Falls	Universal's Islands of Adventure
Best Water Ride	4	Chiapas	Phantasialand
Best Water Ride	5	Timber Mountain Log Ride	Knott's Berry Farm
Best Kids' Area	1	Dollywood	Pigeon Forge, Tennessee
Best Kids' Area	2	Kings Island	Kings Mills, Ohio
Best Kids' Area	3	Canada's Wonderland	Vaughan, Ontario, Canada
Best Kids' Area	4	Efteling	Kaatsheuvel, The Netherlands
Best Kids' Area	5	Paultons Park	Romsey, Hampshire, England, United Kingdom
Best Halloween Event of 2020	1	Six Flags Fiesta Texas	San Antonio, Texas
Best Halloween Event of 2020	2	Busch Gardens Tampa Bay	Tampa, Florida
Best Halloween Event of 2020	3	Six Flags Great Adventure	Jackson, New Jersey
Best Halloween Event of 2020	4	Europa-Park	Rust, Germany
Best Halloween Event of 2020	5	Toverland	Sevenum, The Netherlands
Best New Show	1	Rock The Night	Six Flags Fiesta Texas
Best New Show	2	Down By The Riverside	Silver Dollar City
Best New Show	3	Sweet Summer Nights	Dollywood
Best New Show	4	Celebrate 150 Parade	Cedar Point
Best New Show	5	Deep In The Heart	Six Flags Over Texas
Best New Roller Coaster	1	VelociCoaster	Universal's Islands of Adventure
Best New Roller Coaster	2	Candymonium	Hersheypark
Best New Roller Coaster	3	F.L.Y.	Phantasialand
Best New Roller Coaster	4	Texas Stingray	SeaWorld San Antonio
Best New Roller Coaster	5	Orion	Kings Island
Best New Family Attraction	1	Star Wars: Rise of the Resistance	Disney's Hollywood Studios
Best New Family Attraction	2	Knott's Bear-y Tales: Return to the Fair	Knott's Berry Farm
Best New Family Attraction	3	Mickey & Minnie's Runaway Railway	Disney's Hollywood Studios
Best New Family Attraction	4	Mystic River Falls	Silver Dollar City
Best New Family Attraction	5	Star Wars: Rise of the Resistance	Disneyland
Best New Water Park Ride	1	Cheetah Chase	Splashin' Safari
Best New Water Park Ride	2	Riptide Race	Aquatica Orlando
Best New Water Park Ride	3	Tsunami Surge	Six Flags Hurricane Harbor Chicago
Best New Water Park Ride	4	Venus Vortex	Lake Compounce
Best New Water Park Ride	5	Rally Racer	Waldameer & Water World
Best New Attraction Installation	1	Star Wars: Rise of the Resistance	Disney's Hollywood Studios
Best New Attraction Installation	2	VelociCoaster	Universal's Islands of Adventure
Best New Attraction Installation	3	F.L.Y.	Phantasialand
Best New Attraction Installation	4	Mystic River Falls	Silver Dollar City
Best New Attraction Installation	5	The Ride to Happiness	Plopsaland De Panne
Best Guest Experience	1	Dollywood	Pigeon Forge, Tennessee
Best Guest Experience	2	Holiday World & Splashin' Safari	Santa Claus, Indiana
Best Guest Experience	3	Europa-Park	Rust, Germany
Best Guest Experience	4	Knoebels Amusement Resort	Elysburg, Pennsylvania
Best Guest Experience	5	Kings Island	Mason, Ohio
Best Dark Ride	1	Star Wars: Rise of the Resistance	Disney's Hollywood Studios
Best Dark Ride	2	Pirates of the Caribbean: Battle for the Sunken Treasure	Shanghai Disneyland
Best Dark Ride	3	Harry Potter and the Escape from Gringotts	Universal Studios Florida
Best Dark Ride	4	Twilight Zone Tower of Terror	Disney's Hollywood Studios
Best Dark Ride	5	Reese's Cupfusion	Hersheypark
Best Waterpark Ride	1	Wildebeest	Splashin' Safari
Best Waterpark Ride	2	Krakatau Aqua Coaster	Universal's Volcano Bay Water Theme Park
Best Waterpark Ride	3	Mammoth	Splashin' Safari
Best Waterpark Ride	4	Cheetah Chase	Splashin' Safari
Best Waterpark Ride	5	Master Blaster	Schlitterbahn
Best Innovation	1	Engineered Pre-Cut Wooden Track, The Gravity Group	Cincinnati, Ohio
Best Innovation	2	Clear Gear Disinfectant Spray, Clear Gear	
Best Innovation	3	CMD-CTR Operations App, First Option Software	New Alresford, England
Best Innovation	3	Flying Coaster Loading System, Vekoma	Vlodrop, The Netherlands
Best Innovation	4	ValoJump, Valo Motion	Espoo, Finland
Best Innovation	5	Paperless Data Collection Inspection System, LJM & Associates Inc.	Oldsmar, Florida
Best Innovation	6	Water slide Refurbishment, iSlide	's-Hertogenbosch, The Netherlands
Best Food	1	Knoebels Amusement Resort	Elysburg, Pennsylvania
Best Food	2	Dollywood	Pigeon Forge, Tennessee
Best Food	3	Epcot	Orlando, Florida
Best Food	4	Europa-Park	Rust, Germany
Best Food	5	Silver Dollar City	Branson, Missouri
Best Christmas Event of 2020	1	Dollywood	Pigeon Forge, Tennessee
Best Christmas Event of 2020	2	Silver Dollar City	Branson, Missouri
Best Christmas Event of 2020	3	Give Kids the World Village	Kissimmee, Florida
Best Christmas Event of 2020	4	SeaWorld Orlando	Orlando, Florida
Best Christmas Event of 2020	5	Six Flags Great Adventure	Jackson, New Jersey

Top 50 Steel Roller Coasters
Rank	2021 Recipient	Park	Supplier	Year
1	Fury 325	Carowinds	B&M	2015
2	Millennium Force	Cedar Point	Intamin	2000
3	Steel Vengeance	Cedar Point	Dinn (rebuilt RMC)	1991 (rebuilt 2018)
4	Superman the Ride	Six Flags New England	Intamin	2000
5	Candymonium	Hersheypark	B&M	2020
6	Expedition GeForce	Holiday Park	Intamin	2001
7	Lightning Rod	Dollywood	RMC	2016 (modified to steel coaster in 2021)
8	Leviathan	Canada's Wonderland	B&M	2012
9	Maverick	Cedar Point	Intamin	2007
10	Taron	Phantasialand	Intamin	2016
11	Apollo's Chariot	Busch Gardens Williamsburg	B&M	1999
12	Iron Rattler	Six Flags Fiesta Texas	RCCA (rebuilt RMC)	1992 (rebuilt 2013)
13	Intimidator 305	Kings Dominion	Intamin	2010
14	Nitro	Six Flags Great Adventure	B&M	2001
15	Phantom's Revenge	Kennywood	Arrow Dynamics (rebuilt Morgan)	1991 (rebuilt 2001)
16	Twisted Colossus	Six Flags Magic Mountain	International Amusement Devices (rebuilt RMC)	1978 (rebuilt 2015)
17	Mako	SeaWorld Orlando	B&M	2016
18	VelociCoaster	Universal's Islands of Adventure	Intamin	2021
19	Diamondback	Kings Island	B&M	2009
20	Magnum XL-200	Cedar Point	Arrow Dynamics	1989
21	Alpengeist	Busch Gardens Williamsburg	B&M	1997
22	Montu	Busch Gardens Tampa Bay	B&M	1996
23	Intimidator	Carowinds	B&M	2010
23	Steel Curtain	Kennywood	S&S	2019
25	Mind Bender	Six Flags Over Georgia	Schwarzkopf	1978
26	Time Traveler	Silver Dollar City	Mack Rides	2018
26	X2	Six Flags Magic Mountain	Arrow Dynamics	2002
28	Goliath	Six Flags Over Georgia	B&M	2006
28	Top Thrill Dragster	Cedar Point	Intamin	2003
30	Blue Fire	Europa-Park	Mack Rides	2009
31	Orion	Kings Island	B&M	2020
32	Nemesis	Alton Towers	B&M	1994
33	Hagrid's Magical Creatures Motorbike Adventure	Universal's Islands of Adventure	Intamin	2019
33	Skyrush	Hersheypark	Intamin	2012
35	Steel Dragon 2000	Nagashima Spa Land	Morgan	2000
36	New Texas Giant	Six Flags Over Texas	Dinn (rebuilt RMC)	1990 (rebuilt 2011)
37	Banshee	Kings Island	B&M	2014
38	Behemoth	Canada's Wonderland	B&M	2008
39	Twisted Timbers	Kings Dominion	International Coasters, Inc. (rebuilt RMC)	1994 (rebuilt 2018)
40	Helix	Liseberg	Mack Rides	2014
41	Cheetah Hunt	Busch Gardens Tampa Bay	Intamin	2011
42	Black Mamba	Phantasialand	B&M	2006
42	Wicked Cyclone	Six Flags New England	Frontier Construction (rebuilt RMC)	1983 (rebuilt 2015)
44	Raging Bull	Six Flags Great America	B&M	1999
45	Steel Force	Dorney Park & Wildwater Kingdom	Morgan	1997
46	Jetline	Gröna Lund	Anton Schwarzkopf	1988
47	Shock Wave	Six Flags Over Texas	Schwarzkopf	1978
48	Cannibal	Lagoon		2015
48	Raptor	Cedar Point	B&M	1994
50	Lisebergbanan	Liseberg	Schwarzkopf	1987

Top 50 Wood Roller Coasters
Rank	2021 Recipient	Park	Supplier	Year
1	Phoenix	Knoebels Amusement Resort	PTC	1985
2	The Voyage	Holiday World & Splashin' Safari	The Gravity Group	2006
3	El Toro	Six Flags Great Adventure	Intamin	2006
4	Boulder Dash	Lake Compounce	CCI	2000
5	The Beast	Kings Island		1979
6	Mystic Timbers	Kings Island	GCII	2017
7	GhostRider	Knott's Berry Farm	CCI	1998
8	Ravine Flyer II	Waldameer & Water World	The Gravity Group	2008
9	Outlaw Run	Silver Dollar City	RMC	2013
10	Thunderhead	Dollywood	GCII	2004
11	Lightning Racer	Hersheypark	GCII	2000
12	Gold Striker	California's Great America	GCII	2013
13	Cyclone	Luna Park	Harry C. Baker	1927
13	Jack Rabbit	Kennywood	Harry C. Baker	1921
15	Troy	Toverland	GCII	2007
16	Balder	Liseberg	Intamin	2003
17	The Raven	Holiday World & Splashin' Safari	CCI	1995
17	Wildfire	Kolmården Wildlife Park	RMC	2016
19	Thunderbolt	Kennywood	John Miller (rebuilt Andy Vettel)	1924 (rebuilt 1968)
20	The Comet	The Great Escape	PTC	1994
21	Shivering Timbers	Michigan's Adventure	CCI	1998
22	Boardwalk Bullet	Kemah Boardwalk	Martin & Vleminckx	2007
23	Wodan - Timburcoaster	Europa-Park	GCII	2012
24	The Legend	Holiday World & Splashin' Safari	CCI	2000
25	Colossos	Heide Park	Intamin	2001
26	Goliath	Six Flags Great America	RMC	2014
27	Flying Turns	Knoebels Amusement Resort		2013
28	Giant Dipper	Santa Cruz Beach Boardwalk	Arthur Looff	1924
29	White Lightning	Fun Spot America Orlando	GCII	2013
30	Renegade	Valleyfair	GCII	2007
31	Prowler	Worlds of Fun	GCII	2009
32	Twister	Knoebels Amusement Resort		1999
33	Rampage	Alabama Splash Adventure	CCI	1998
34	Coaster	Playland	Carl Phare/Walker LeRoy	1958
35	Blue Streak	Conneaut Lake Park	Ed Vettel	1938
36	Screamin' Eagle	Six Flags St. Louis	PTC	1976
37	Comet	Hersheypark	PTC	1946
38	Blue Streak	Cedar Point	PTC	1964
39	Hades 360	Mount Olympus Theme Park	The Gravity Group	1995
40	El Toro	Freizeitpark Plohn	GCII	2009
41	Cornball Express	Indiana Beach	CCI	2001
42	The Boss	Six Flags St. Louis	CCI	2000
43	The Cú Chulainn Coaster	Tayto Park	The Gravity Group	2015
44	Rutschebanen	Tivoli Gardens	Valdemar Lebech	1914
45	Texas Stingray	SeaWorld San Antonio	GCII	2020
45	Zippin Pippin	Bay Beach Amusement Park	John Miller (rebuilt The Gravity Group)	1912 (rebuilt 2011)
47	American Thunder	Six Flags St. Louis	GCII	2009
48	InvadR	Busch Gardens Williamsburg	GCII	2017
49	Grand National	Blackpool Pleasure Beach	Charles Paige	1935
50	T Express	Everland	Intamin	2008

=== 2020 winners ===
2020 Golden Ticket Awards
The Amusement Today Golden Ticket Awards were announced on September 23, 2020.

Category	Rank	2020 Recipient	Location
Innovation of the Year	1 (Tie)	Six Flags Over Texas	Arlington, Texas
Innovation of the Year	1 (Tie)	Six Flags Entertainment Corporation	Grand Prairie, Texas
Innovation of the Year	2	Embed	Dallas, Texas
Innovation of the Year	3	Ralph S. Alberts	Montoursville, Pennsylvania
Innovation of the Year	4	Chance Rides	Wichita, Kansas
Innovation of the Year	5	Zamperla	Vicenza, Italy
Industry Leader: Supplier	1	Gateway Ticketing Systems	Gilbertsville, Pennsylvania
Industry Leader: Supplier	2	Embed	Dallas, Texas
Industry Leader: Supplier	3	Zamperla	Vicenza, Italy
Industry Leader: Supplier	4	Bob's Space Racers	Holly Hill, Florida
Industry Leader: Supplier	5	Firestone Financial	Needham, Massachusetts
Industry Leader: Amusement/Theme Park	1	Knotts Berry Farm	Buena Park, California
Industry Leader: Amusement/Theme Park	2	Gatorland	Orlando, Florida
Industry Leader: Amusement/Theme Park	3	San Antonio Zoo	San Antonio, Texas
Industry Leader: Amusement/Theme Park	4	Kentucky Kingdom	Louisville, Kentucky
Industry Leader: Amusement/Theme Park	5	Quassy Amusement Park	Middlebury, Connecticut
Industry Leader: FEC	1	Urban Air Adventure Parks	Rockwall, Texas
Industry Leader: FEC	2	Scene75 Entertainment Centres	Dayton, Ohio
Industry Leader: FEC	3	Funplex	East Hanover Township, New Jersey
Industry Leader: FEC	4	Funspot	Laconia, New Hampshire
Industry Leader: Outdoor Entertainment	1	Tally Amusements	Fort Worth, Texas
Industry Leader: Outdoor Entertainment	2	Sky Eye/Biggest Wheel	Winter Park, Florida
Industry Leader: Outdoor Entertainment	3	Rides 4 U	Somerville, New Jersey
Industry Leader: Outdoor Entertainment	4	Rocken Graphics	Riverview, Florida
Industry Leader: Outdoor Entertainment	5	Delaware State Fair	Harrington, Delaware
Industry Leader: Association	1	New England Association of Amusement Parks and Attractions	Saco, Maine

=== 2019 winners ===
2019 Golden Ticket Awards
Host Park: Silverwood Theme Park The Amusement Today Golden Ticket Awards were announced on September 9, 2019.

Category	Rank	2019 Recipient	Location/Park
Best Park	1	Europa-Park	Rust, Germany
Best Park	2	Dollywood	Pigeon Forge, Tennessee
Best Park	3	Cedar Point	Sandusky, Ohio
Best Park	4	Disneyland	Anaheim, California
Best Park	5	Busch Gardens Williamsburg	Williamsburg, Virginia
Best Waterpark	1	Schlitterbahn	New Braunfels, Texas
Best Waterpark	2	Universal's Volcano Bay Water Theme Park	Orlando, Florida
Best Waterpark	3	Holiday World & Splashin' Safari	Santa Claus, Indiana
Best Waterpark	4	Disney's Typhoon Lagoon	Orlando, Florida
Best Waterpark	5	Disney's Blizzard Beach	Orlando, Florida
Best Family Park	1	Dutch Wonderland	Lancaster, Pennsylvania
Best Family Park	2	Sesame Place	Langhorne, Pennsylvania
Best Family Park	3	Idlewild and Soak Zone	Ligonier, Pennsylvania
Best Family Park	4	Paultons Park	Romsey, England
Best Family Park	5	Legoland Florida	Winter Haven, Florida
Best Wildlife/Marine Park	1	SeaWorld Orlando	Orlando, Florida
Best Wildlife/Marine Park	2	Disney's Animal Kingdom	Orlando, Florida
Best Wildlife/Marine Park	3	Discovery Cove	Orlando, Florida
Best Wildlife/Marine Park	4	Busch Gardens Tampa Bay	Tampa, Florida
Best Wildlife/Marine Park	5	Ocean Park	Hong Kong, China
Breakout Family Entertainment Center	1	C.J. Barrymore's	Clinton Township, Michigan
Breakout Family Entertainment Center	2	Funland of Fredericksburg	Fredericksburg, Virginia
Breakout Family Entertainment Center	3	Two Bit Circus	Los Angeles, California
Breakout Family Entertainment Center	4	Clifton Hill	Niagara Falls, Ontario, Canada
Breakout Family Entertainment Center	5	Frankie's Fun Park	Charlotte, North Carolina
Most Beautiful Park	1	Busch Gardens Williamsburg	Williamsburg, Virginia
Most Beautiful Park	2	Europa-Park	Rust, Germany
Most Beautiful Park	3	Dollywood	Pigeon Forge, Tennessee
Most Beautiful Park	4	Gilroy Gardens	Gilroy, California
Most Beautiful Park	5	Silver Dollar City	Branson, Missouri
Best Water Ride	1	Valhalla	Blackpool Pleasure Beach
Best Water Ride	2	Timber Mountain Log Ride	Knott's Berry Farm
Best Water Ride	3	Dudley Do-Right's Ripsaw Falls	Universal's Islands of Adventure
Best Water Ride	4	Infinity Falls	SeaWorld Orlando
Best Water Ride	5	Jurassic Park River Adventure	Universal's Islands of Adventure
Best Kids' Area	1	Dollywood	Pigeon Forge, Tennessee
Best Kids' Area	2	Kings Island	Kings Mills, Ohio
Best Kids' Area	3	Canada's Wonderland	Vaughan, Ontario, Canada
Best Kids' Area	4	Efteling	Kaatsheuvel, The Netherlands
Best Kids' Area	5	Universal's Islands of Adventure	Orlando, Florida
Best Halloween Event of 2018	1	Universal Orlando Resort	Orlando, Florida
Best Halloween Event of 2018	2	Knott's Berry Farm	Buena Park, California
Best Halloween Event of 2018	3	Knoebels Amusement Resort	Elysburg, Pennsylvania
Best Halloween Event of 2018	4	Europa-Park	Rust, Germany
Best Halloween Event of 2018	5	Kennywood	West Mifflin, Pennsylvania
Best New Show	1	Reuben's Swashbuckling Adventure	Silver Dollar City
Best New Show	2	Paddington On Ice - The Grand Voyage	Europa-Park
Best New Show	3	Detention at Rockville	Six Flags Fiesta Texas
Best New Roller Coaster	1	Steel Curtain	Kennywood
Best New Roller Coaster	2	Hagrid's Magical Creatures Motorbike Adventure	Universal's Islands of Adventure
Best New Roller Coaster	3	Copperhead Strike	Carowinds
Best New Roller Coaster	4	Yukon Striker	Canada's Wonderland
Best New Roller Coaster	5	Untamed	Walibi Holland
Best New Family Attraction	1	Millennium Falcon: Smugglers Run	Disneyland
Best New Family Attraction	2	Kaleidoscape	Elitch Gardens
Best New Family Attraction	3	Kings Mills Antique Autos	Kings Island
Best New Family Attraction	4	Tidal Twister	SeaWorld San Diego
Best New Family Attraction	5	Masters of Flight	Legoland Florida
Best New Water Park Ride	1	Cutback Water Coaster	Water Country USA
Best New Water Park Ride	2	Lava Drifting	Shanghai Haichang Ocean Park
Best New Water Park Ride	3	Daredevil's Peak	Perfect Day at CocoCay
Best New Water Park Ride	4	Infinity Racers	Schlitterbahn Galveston
Best New Water Park Ride	5	Rapid Remix	SoundWaves at Gaylord Opryland
Best New Attraction Installation	1	Hagrid's Magical Creatures Motorbike Adventure	Universal's Islands of Adventure
Best New Attraction Installation	2	Steel Curtain	Kennywood
Best New Attraction Installation	3	Copperhead Strike	Carowinds
Best New Attraction Installation	4	Sesame Street: Street Mission	PortAventura World
Best New Attraction Installation	5	The Zenith	Mega Parc
Best Guest Experience	1	Dollywood	Pigeon Forge, Tennessee
Best Guest Experience	2	Splashin' Safari	Santa Claus, Indiana
Best Guest Experience	3	Silver Dollar City	Branson, Missouri
Best Guest Experience	4	Europa-Park	Rust, Germany
Best Guest Experience	5	Disneyland	Anaheim, California
Best Dark Ride	1	Pirates of the Caribbean: Battle for the Sunken Treasure	Shanghai Disneyland
Best Dark Ride	2	Harry Potter and the Forbidden Journey	Universal's Islands of Adventure
Best Dark Ride	3	Twilight Zone Tower of Terror	Disney's Hollywood Studios
Best Dark Ride	4	Indiana Jones Adventure: Temple of the Forbidden Eye	Disneyland
Best Dark Ride	5	Haunted Mansion	Knoebels Amusement Resort
Best Waterpark Ride	1	Wildebeest (ride)	Splashin' Safari
Best Waterpark Ride	2	Krakatau Aqua Coaster	Universal's Volcano Bay Water Theme Park
Best Waterpark Ride	3	Mammoth	Splashin' Safari
Best Waterpark Ride	4	Ray Rush	SeaWorld Orlando
Best Waterpark Ride	5	The Falls	Schlitterbahn
Best Food	1	Knoebels Amusement Resort	Elysburg, Pennsylvania
Best Food	2	Dollywood	Pigeon Forge, Tennessee
Best Food	3	Epcot	Orlando, Florida
Best Food	4	Silver Dollar City	Branson, Missouri
Best Food	5	Europa-Park	Rust, Germany
Best Christmas Event of 2018	1	Dollywood	Pigeon Forge, Tennessee
Best Christmas Event of 2018	2	Silver Dollar City	Branson, Missouri
Best Christmas Event of 2018	3	Hersheypark	Hershey, Pennsylvania
Best Christmas Event of 2018	4	SeaWorld Orlando	Orlando, Florida
Best Christmas Event of 2018	5	Kings Island	Kings Mills, Ohio

Top 50 Steel Roller Coasters
Rank	2019 Recipient	Park	Supplier	Year
1	Fury 325	Carowinds	B&M	2015
2	Millennium Force	Cedar Point	Intamin	2000
3	Steel Vengeance	Cedar Point	Dinn (rebuilt RMC)	1991 (rebuilt 2018)
4	Superman the Ride	Six Flags New England	Intamin	2000
5	Expedition GeForce	Holiday Park	Intamin	2001
6	Twisted Colossus	Six Flags Magic Mountain	International Amusement Devices (rebuilt RMC)	1978 (rebuilt 2015)
7	Iron Rattler	Six Flags Fiesta Texas	RCCA (rebuilt RMC)	1992 (rebuilt 2013)
8	Apollo's Chariot	Busch Gardens Williamsburg	B&M	1999
9	Leviathan	Canada's Wonderland	B&M	2012
10	Nitro	Six Flags Great Adventure	B&M	2001
11	Intimidator 305	Kings Dominion	Intamin	2010
12	Phantom's Revenge	Kennywood	Arrow Dynamics (rebuilt Morgan)	1991 (rebuilt 2001)
13	Maverick	Cedar Point	Intamin	2007
14	Diamondback	Kings Island	B&M	2009
15	Mako	SeaWorld Orlando	B&M	2016
16	Nemesis	Alton Towers	B&M	1994
17	Taron	Phantasialand	Intamin	2016
18	Magnum XL-200	Cedar Point	Arrow Dynamics	1989
19	Helix	Liseberg	Mack Rides	2014
20	Steel Dragon 2000	Nagashima Spa Land	Morgan	2000
21	Top Thrill Dragster	Cedar Point	Intamin	2003
22	Time Traveler	Silver Dollar City	Mack Rides	2018
23	Blue Fire	Europa-Park	Mack Rides	2009
23	X2	Six Flags Magic Mountain	Arrow Dynamics	2002
25	Mind Bender	Six Flags Over Georgia	Schwarzkopf	1978
26	New Texas Giant	Six Flags Over Texas	Dinn (rebuilt RMC)	1990 (rebuilt 2011)
27	Skyrush	Hersheypark	Intamin	2012
28	Intimidator	Carowinds	B&M	2010
29	Behemoth	Canada's Wonderland	B&M	2008
30	Goliath	Six Flags Over Georgia	B&M	2006
30	Montu	Busch Gardens Tampa Bay	B&M	1996
32	Alpengeist	Busch Gardens Williamsburg	B&M	1997
33	Banshee	Kings Island	B&M	2014
34	Yukon Striker	Canada's Wonderland	B&M	2019
35	Tron Lightcycle Power Run	Shanghai Disneyland	Vekoma	2016
36	Cheetah Hunt	Busch Gardens Tampa Bay	Intamin	2011
37	Twisted Timbers	Kings Dominion	International Coasters, Inc. (rebuilt RMC)	1994 (rebuilt 2018)
38	Verbolten	Busch Gardens Williamsburg	Zierer	2012
39	Wicked Cyclone	Six Flags New England	Frontier Construction (rebuilt RMC)	1983 (rebuilt 2015)
40	Kumba	Busch Gardens Tampa Bay	B&M	1996
41	Cannibal	Lagoon		2015
42	Steel Curtain	Kennywood	S&S	2019
43	Black Mamba	Phantasialand	B&M	2006
44	Whizzer	Six Flags Great America	Schwarzkopf	1976
45	Full Throttle	Six Flags Magic Mountain	Premier Rides	2013
46	Raging Bull	Six Flags Great America	B&M	1999
47	Lisebergbanan	Liseberg	Schwarzkopf	1987
47	Superman: Ride of Steel	Six Flags America	Intamin	2000
49	Goliath	Six Flags Magic Mountain	Giovanola	2000
49	Tatsu	Six Flags Magic Mountain	B&M	2006

Top 50 Wood Roller Coasters
Rank	2019 Recipient	Park	Supplier	Year
1	Phoenix	Knoebels Amusement Resort	PTC	1985
2	The Voyage	Holiday World & Splashin' Safari	The Gravity Group	2006
3	El Toro	Six Flags Great Adventure	Intamin	2006
4	Boulder Dash	Lake Compounce	CCI	2000
5	The Beast	Kings Island		1979
6	GhostRider	Knott's Berry Farm	CCI	1998
7	Lightning Rod	Dollywood	RMC	2016
8	Outlaw Run	Silver Dollar City	RMC	2013
9	Ravine Flyer II	Waldameer & Water World	The Gravity Group	2008
10	Mystic Timbers	Kings Island	GCII	2017
11	Thunderhead	Dollywood	GCII	2004
12	Gold Striker	California's Great America	GCII	2013
13	Balder	Liseberg	Intamin	2003
14	Lightning Racer	Hersheypark	GCII	2000
15	Shivering Timbers	Michigan's Adventure	CCI	1998
16	Wildfire	Kolmården Wildlife Park	RMC	2016
17	Giant Dipper	Santa Cruz Beach Boardwalk	Arthur Looff	1924
18	Thunderbolt	Kennywood	John Miller (rebuilt Andy Vettel)	1924 (rebuilt 1968)
19	The Comet	The Great Escape	PTC	1994
20	Jack Rabbit	Kennywood	Harry C. Baker	1921
21	The Raven	Holiday World & Splashin' Safari	CCI	1995
22	White Lightning	Fun Spot America Orlando	GCII	2013
23	Wodan - Timburcoaster	Europa-Park	GCII	2012
24	Renegade	Valleyfair	GCII	2007
25	Troy	Toverland	GCII	2007
26	The Legend	Holiday World & Splashin' Safari	CCI	2000
27	Goliath	Six Flags Great America	RMC	2014
28	Cyclone	Luna Park	Harry C. Baker	1927
29	Prowler	Worlds of Fun	GCII	2009
30	Colossos	Heide Park	Intamin	2001
31	Boardwalk Bullet	Kemah Boardwalk	Martin & Vleminckx	2007
32	Coaster	Playland	Carl Phare/Walker LeRoy	1958
33	Flying Turns	Knoebels Amusement Resort		2013
34	Rampage	Alabama Splash Adventure	CCI	1998
35	The Cú Chulainn Coaster	Tayto Park (since renamed Emerald Park)	The Gravity Group	2015
36	The Boss	Six Flags St. Louis	CCI	2000
37	T Express	Everland	Intamin	2008
38	Blue Streak	Cedar Point	PTC	1964
39	American Thunder	Six Flags St. Louis	GCII	2009
40	Blue Streak	Conneaut Lake Park	Ed Vettel	1938
41	InvadR	Busch Gardens Williamsburg	GCII	2017
42	Screamin' Eagle	Six Flags St. Louis	PTC	1976
43	Hades 360	Mount Olympus Theme Park	The Gravity Group	1995
44	Megafobia	Oakwood Theme Park	CCI	1996
45	Rutschebanen	Tivoli Gardens	Valdemar Lebech	1915
45	Twister	Knoebels Amusement Resort		1999
47	El Toro	Freizeitpark Plohn	GCII	2009
48	Twister	Gröna Lund	The Gravity Group	2011
49	Switchback	ZDT's Amusement Park	The Gravity Group	2015
50	Grizzly	Kings Dominion	Taft Broadcasting Company	1982

=== 2018 winners ===
2018 Golden Ticket Awards
Host Park: Silver Dollar City The Amusement Today Golden Ticket Awards were announced on September 8, 2018.

Category	Rank	2018 Recipient	Location/Park	Vote
Best New Ride (Amusement Park)	1	Steel Vengeance	Cedar Point	33%
Best New Ride (Amusement Park)	2	Time Traveler	Silver Dollar City	29%
Best New Ride (Amusement Park)	3	Twisted Timbers	Kings Dominion	6%
Best New Ride (Amusement Park)	4	Oscar's Wacky Taxi	Sesame Place	5%
Best New Ride (Amusement Park)	4	Wicker Man	Alton Towers	5%
Best New Ride (Water Park)	1	Ray Rush	Aquatica Orlando	23%
Best New Ride (Water Park)	2	Breakers Edge Water Coaster	Hersheypark	21%
Best New Ride (Water Park)	3	Whitecap Racer	Hersheypark	12%
Best New Ride (Water Park)	4	Rock Wheel	Chimelong Water Park	11%
Best New Ride (Water Park)	5	Raja	Noah's Ark	9%
Best Park	1	Europa-Park	Rust, Germany	25%
Best Park	2	Cedar Point	Sandusky, Ohio	20%
Best Park	3	Knoebels Amusement Resort	Elysburg, Pennsylvania	8%
Best Park	4	Busch Gardens Williamsburg	Williamsburg, Virginia	7%
Best Park	5	Dollywood	Pigeon Forge, Tennessee	6.5%
Best Waterpark	1	Schlitterbahn New Braunfels	New Braunfels, Texas	51%
Best Waterpark	2	Holiday World and Splashin' Safari	Santa Claus, Indiana	20%
Best Waterpark	3	Universal's Volcano Bay Water Theme Park	Orlando, Florida	8%
Best Waterpark	4	Dollywood's Splash Country	Pigeon Forge, Tennessee	5%
Best Waterpark	5	Aquatica Orlando	Orlando, Florida	4%
Best Children's Park	1	Idlewild and Soak Zone	Ligonier, Pennsylvania	16%
Best Children's Park	2	Morgan's Wonderland	San Antonio, Texas	11%
Best Children's Park	3	Sesame Place	Langhorne, Pennsylvania	10%
Best Children's Park	4	Legoland Florida	Winter Haven, Florida	8%
Best Children's Park	5	Storybook Land	Egg Harbor Township, New Jersey	7%
Best Marine Life Park	1	SeaWorld Orlando	Orlando, Florida	56%
Best Marine Life Park	2	SeaWorld San Diego	San Diego, California	13%
Best Marine Life Park	3	SeaWorld San Antonio	San Antonio, Texas	9%
Best Marine Life Park	4	Discovery Cove	Orlando, Florida	7%
Best Marine Life Park	5	Ocean Park	Hong Kong, China	6%
Best Marine Life Park	5	Six Flags Discovery Kingdom	Vallejo, California	6%
Best Seaside Park	1	Santa Cruz Beach Boardwalk	Santa Cruz, California	33%
Best Seaside Park	2	Morey's Piers	Wildwood, New Jersey	22%
Best Seaside Park	3	Blackpool Pleasure Beach	Blackpool, England	20%
Best Seaside Park	4	Gröna Lund	Stockholm, Sweden	19%
Best Seaside Park	5	Kemah Boardwalk	Kemah, Texas	4%
Best Kids’ Area	1	Kings Island	Kings Mills, Ohio	23%
Best Kids’ Area	2	Universal's Islands of Adventure	Orlando, Florida	13%
Best Kids’ Area	3	Efteling	Kaatsheuvel, The Netherlands	10%
Best Kids’ Area	4	Europa-Park	Rust, Germany	9%
Best Kids’ Area	5	Paultons Park	Romsey, England	8%
Cleanest Park	1	Holiday World and Splashin' Safari	Santa Claus, Indiana	25%
Cleanest Park	2	Busch Gardens Williamsburg	Williamsburg, Virginia	12%
Cleanest Park	3	Dollywood	Pigeon Forge, Tennessee	11%
Cleanest Park	4	Europa-Park	Rust, Germany	9%
Cleanest Park	5	Tokyo DisneySea	Tokyo, Japan	8%
Friendliest Park	1	Dollywood	Pigeon Forge, Tennessee	29%
Friendliest Park	2	Silver Dollar City	Branson, Missouri	19%
Friendliest Park	3	Holiday World and Splashin' Safari	Santa Claus, Indiana	15%
Friendliest Park	4	Knoebels Amusement Resort	Elysburg, Pennsylvania	12%
Friendliest Park	5	Lagoon	Farmington, Utah	4%
Friendliest Park	5	Magic Kingdom	Orlando, Florida	4%
Best Shows	1	Dollywood	Pigeon Forge, Tennessee	42%
Best Shows	2	Six Flags Fiesta Texas	San Antonio, Texas	14%
Best Shows	3	Busch Gardens Williamsburg	Williamsburg, Virginia	9%
Best Shows	4	Disney's Animal Kingdom	Orlando, Florida	5%
Best Shows	4	Silver Dollar City	Branson, Missouri	5%
Best Landscaping	1	Busch Gardens Williamsburg	Williamsburg, Virginia	34%
Best Landscaping	2	Gilroy Gardens	Gilroy, California	16%
Best Landscaping	3	Efteling	Kaatsheuvel, The Netherlands	12%
Best Landscaping	4	Tivoli Gardens	Copenhagen, Denmark	9%
Best Landscaping	5	Disney's Animal Kingdom	Orlando, Florida	6%
Best Landscaping	5	Europa-Park	Rust, Germany	6%
Best Food	1	Knoebels Amusement Resort	Elysburg, Pennsylvania	22%
Best Food	2	Dollywood	Pigeon Forge, Tennessee	20%
Best Food	3	Epcot	Orlando, Florida	14%
Best Food	4	Silver Dollar City	Branson, Missouri	13%
Best Food	5	Busch Gardens Williamsburg	Williamsburg, Virginia	8%
Best Carousel	1	Grand Carousel	Knoebels Amusement Resort	43%
Best Carousel	2	Looff Carousel	Santa Cruz Beach Boardwalk	17%
Best Carousel	3	Riverview Carousel	Six Flags Over Georgia	8%
Best Carousel	4	Stoomcarrousel	Efteling	6%
Best Carousel	5	Caro-Seuss-El	Universal's Islands of Adventure	5%
Best Water Ride (Park)	1	Valhalla	Blackpool Pleasure Beach	22%
Best Water Ride (Park)	2	Dudley Do-Right's Ripsaw Falls	Universal's Islands of Adventure	18%
Best Water Ride (Park)	3	Splash Mountain	Magic Kingdom	10%
Best Water Ride (Park)	4	Chiapas	Phantasialand	9.5%
Best Water Ride (Park)	5	Timber Mountain Log Ride	Knott's Berry Farm	9%
Best Water Park Ride	1	Wildebeest	Holiday World and Splashin' Safari	29%
Best Water Park Ride	2	Mammoth	Holiday World and Splashin' Safari	16%
Best Water Park Ride	3	The Falls	Schlitterbahn	11%
Best Water Park Ride	4	Master Blaster	Schlitterbahn	10%
Best Water Park Ride	5	Krakatau Aqua Coaster	Universal's Volcano Bay Water Theme Park	9%
Best Dark Ride	1	The Twilight Zone Tower of Terror	Disney's Hollywood Studios	13%
Best Dark Ride	2	Harry Potter and the Forbidden Journey	Universal's Islands of Adventure	12%
Best Dark Ride	3	Haunted Mansion	Knoebels Amusement Resort	11%
Best Dark Ride	4	Pirates of the Caribbean: Battle for the Sunken Treasure	Shanghai Disneyland	10%
Best Dark Ride	5	Harry Potter and the Escape from Gringotts	Universal Studios Florida	9%
Best Indoor Roller Coaster	1	Revenge of the Mummy: The Ride	Universal Studios Florida	25%
Best Indoor Roller Coaster	2	Space Mountain	Disneyland	12%
Best Indoor Roller Coaster	3	Tron Lightcycle Power Run	Shanghai Disneyland	11.5%
Best Indoor Roller Coaster	3	Winja's Fear & Force	Phantasialand	11.5%
Best Indoor Roller Coaster	5	Black Diamond	Knoebels Amusement Resort	11%
Best Funhouse/Walk-Through	1	Noah's Ark	Kennywood	34%
Best Funhouse/Walk-Through	2	Frankenstein's Castle	Indiana Beach	13%
Best Funhouse/Walk-Through	3	Ghost Ship	Morey's Piers	12%
Best Funhouse/Walk-Through	4	Gasten Ghost Hotel	Liseberg	11%
Best Funhouse/Walk-Through	5	Lustiga Huset	Gröna Lund	10%
Best Halloween Event	1	Universal Orlando Resort	Orlando, Florida	28%
Best Halloween Event	2	Knott's Berry Farm	Buena Park, California	22%
Best Halloween Event	3	Knoebels Amusement Resort	Elysburg, Pennsylvania	13%
Best Halloween Event	4	Kings Island	Kings Mills, Ohio	6%
Best Halloween Event	5	Kennywood	West Mifflin, Pennsylvania	5%
Best Halloween Event	5	Six Flags Fiesta Texas	San Antonio, Texas	5%
Best Christmas Event	1	Dollywood	Pigeon Forge, Tennessee	35%
Best Christmas Event	2	Silver Dollar City	Branson, Missouri	14%
Best Christmas Event	3	Disneyland	Anaheim, California	8%
Best Christmas Event	4	Kings Island	Kings Mills, Ohio	6%
Best Christmas Event	4	Magic Kingdom	Orlando, Florida	6%

Top 50 Steel Roller Coasters
Rank	2018 Recipient	Park	Supplier	Year	Points
1	Fury 325	Carowinds	B&M	2015	1,222
2	Millennium Force	Cedar Point	Intamin	2000	1,156
3	Steel Vengeance	Cedar Point	Dinn (rebuilt RMC)	1991 (rebuilt 2018)	829
4	Expedition GeForce	Holiday Park	Intamin	2001	540
5	Superman the Ride	Six Flags New England	Intamin	2000	535
6	Apollo's Chariot	Busch Gardens Williamsburg	B&M	1999	522
7	Iron Rattler	Six Flags Fiesta Texas	Dinn (rebuilt RMC)	1990 (rebuilt 2013)	483
8	Leviathan	Canada's Wonderland	B&M	2012	410
9	Maverick	Cedar Point	Intamin	2007	390
10	Diamondback	Kings Island	B&M	2009	347
11	Nitro	Six Flags Great Adventure	B&M	2001	345
12	Intimidator 305	Kings Dominion	Intamin	2010	344
13	Phantom's Revenge	Kennywood	Arrow Dynamics (rebuilt Morgan)	1991 (rebuilt 2001)	324
14	Magnum XL-200	Cedar Point	Arrow Dynamics	1989	300
15	Taron	Phantasialand	Intamin	2016	283
16	Top Thrill Dragster	Cedar Point	Intamin	2003	278
17	Mako	SeaWorld Orlando	B&M	2016	251
18	Time Traveler	Silver Dollar City	Mack Rides	2018	248
19	Blue Fire	Europa-Park	Mack Rides	2006	244
20	Nemesis	Alton Towers	B&M	1994	238
21	Helix	Liseberg	Mack Rides	2014	234
22	Intimidator	Carowinds	B&M	2010	233
23	New Texas Giant	Six Flags Over Texas	Dinn (rebuilt RMC)	1992 (rebuilt 2011)	222
24	Twisted Colossus	Six Flags Magic Mountain	International Amusement Devices (rebuilt RMC)	1978 (rebuilt 2015)	212
25	Mind Bender	Six Flags Over Georgia	Schwarzkopf	1978	211
26	Goliath	Six Flags Over Georgia	B&M	2006	201
27	Behemoth	Canada's Wonderland	B&M	2008	187
28	Montu	Busch Gardens Tampa Bay	B&M	1996	186
29	Banshee	Kings Island	B&M	2014	175
30	Skyrush	Hersheypark	Intamin	2012	173
31	X2	Six Flags Magic Mountain	Arrow Dynamics	2002	162
32	Alpengeist	Busch Gardens Williamsburg	B&M	1997	160
33	Wicked Cyclone	Six Flags New England	Frontier Construction (rebuilt RMC)	1983 (rebuilt 2015)	158
34	Black Mamba	Phantasialand	B&M	2006	137
35	Cheetah Hunt	Busch Gardens Tampa Bay	Intamin	2011	132
36	Verbolten	Busch Gardens Williamsburg	Zierer	2012	116
37	Kumba	Busch Gardens Tampa Bay	B&M	1996	115
38	Twisted Timbers	Kings Dominion	International Coasters, Inc. (rebuilt RMC)	1994 (rebuilt 2018)	109
39	Superman: Ride of Steel	Six Flags America	Intamin	2000	99
39	Jetline	Gröna Lund	Anton Schwarzkopf	1988	99
41	Goliath	La Ronde	B&M	2006	97
42	Lisebergbanan	Liseberg	Schwarzkopf	1987	96
43	Griffon	Busch Gardens Williamsburg	B&M	2007	93
44	Cannibal	Lagoon		2015	92
45	Shambhala	PortAventura Park	B&M	2012	89
46	Expedition Everest	Disney's Animal Kingdom	Vekoma	2006	82
47	Storm Chaser	Kentucky Kingdom	Martin & Vleminckx (rebuilt RMC)	1998 (rebuilt 2016)	81
48	Raging Bull	Six Flags Great America	B&M	1999	78
49	Thunderbird	Holiday World & Splashin' Safari	B&M	2015	72
50	Whizzer	Six Flags Great America	Schwarzkopf	1976	70

Top 50 Wood Roller Coasters
Rank	2018 Recipient	Park	Supplier	Year	Points
1	Phoenix	Knoebels Amusement Resort	PTC	1985	1,330
2	El Toro	Six Flags Great Adventure	Intamin	2006	1,197
3	The Voyage	Holiday World & Splashin' Safari	The Gravity Group	2006	1,086
4	Boulder Dash	Lake Compounce	CCI	2000	982
5	The Beast	Kings Island		1979	781
6	Lightning Rod	Dollywood	RMC	2016	691
7	Outlaw Run	Silver Dollar City	RMC	2013	573
8	Ravine Flyer II	Waldameer & Water World	The Gravity Group	2008	560
9	Gold Striker	California's Great America	GCII	2013	497
10	Thunderhead	Dollywood	GCII	2004	477
11	Mystic Timbers	Kings Island	GCII	2017	465
12	Lightning Racer	Hersheypark	GCII	2000	329
13	GhostRider	Knott's Berry Farm	CCI	1998	307
14	Balder	Liseberg	Intamin	2003	289
15	Thunderbolt	Kennywood	John Miller (rebuilt Andy Vettel)	1924 (rebuilt 1968)	260
16	Wodan - Timburcoaster	Europa-Park	GCII	2012	236
17	Wildfire	Kolmården Wildlife Park	RMC	2016	232
18	The Raven	Holiday World & Splashin' Safari	CCI	1995	229
19	Goliath	Six Flags Great America	RMC	2014	215
20	Jack Rabbit	Kennywood	Harry C. Baker	1921	211
21	Giant Dipper	Santa Cruz Beach Boardwalk	Arthur Looff	1924	206
21	Shivering Timbers	Michigan's Adventure	CCI	1998	206
23	The Legend	Holiday World & Splashin' Safari	CCI	2000	201
24	White Lightning	Fun Spot America Orlando	GCII	2013	196
25	Troy	Toverland	GCII	2007	183
26	Renegade	Valleyfair	GCII	2007	182
27	The Cú Chulainn Coaster	Tayto Park	The Gravity Group	2015	177
28	Colossos	Heide Park	Intamin	2001	171
29	Cyclone	Luna Park	Harry C. Baker	1927	169
30	Prowler	Worlds of Fun	GCII	2009	165
30	Rampage	Alabama Splash Adventure	CCI	1998	165
32	The Comet	The Great Escape	PTC	1994	164
33	Boardwalk Bullet	Kemah Boardwalk	Martin & Vleminckx	2007	157
34	Flying Turns	Knoebels Amusement Resort		2013	148
35	Rutschebanen	Tivoli Gardens	Valdemar Lebech	1915	135
36	Switchback	ZDT's Amusement Park	The Gravity Group	2015	130
37	Blue Streak	Conneaut Lake Park	Ed Vettel	1938	118
38	American Thunder	Six Flags St. Louis	GCII	2009	117
38	Screamin' Eagle	Six Flags St. Louis	PTC	1976	117
40	Grizzly	Kings Dominion	Taft Broadcasting Company	1982	115
41	Blue Streak	Cedar Point	PTC	1964	109
42	Coaster	Playland	Carl Phare/Walker LeRoy	1958	107
43	The Boss	Six Flags St. Louis	CCI	2000	106
44	The Wild One	Six Flags America	Dinn	1986	98
45	T Express	Everland	Intamin	2008	87
46	Megafobia	Oakwood Theme Park	CCI	1996	84
47	Hades 360	Mt. Olympus Theme Park	The Gravity Group	1995	80
48	Mine Blower	Fun Spot America Kissimmee	The Gravity Group	2017	79
49	Wooden Warrior	Quassy Amusement Park	The Gravity Group	2011	77
50	Twister	Gröna Lund	The Gravity Group	2011	75

=== 2017 winners ===
2017 Golden Ticket Awards
Host Park: Lake Compounce The Amusement Today Golden Ticket Awards were announced on September 9, 2017.

Category	Rank	2017 Recipient	Location/Park	Vote
Best New Ride (Amusement Park)	1	Mystic Timbers	Kings Island	45%
Best New Ride (Amusement Park)	2	Avatar Flight of Passage	Disney's Animal Kingdom	15%
Best New Ride (Amusement Park)	3	Mine Blower	Fun Spot America - Kissimmee	8%
Best New Ride (Amusement Park)	4	InvadR	Busch Gardens Williamsburg	7%
Best New Ride (Amusement Park)	5	Wave Breaker: The Rescue Coaster	SeaWorld San Antonio	6%
Best New Ride (Water Park)	1	Thunder Rapids	Six Flags Fiesta Texas	47%
Best New Ride (Water Park)	2	Krakatau Aqua Coaster	Universal's Volcano Bay Water Theme Park	31%
Best New Ride (Water Park)	3	Point Plummet	Cedar Point Shores	7%
Best New Ride (Water Park)	3	Miss Adventure Falls	Disney's Typhoon Lagoon	7%
Best New Ride (Water Park)	5	Ko’okiri Body Plunge	Universal's Volcano Bay Water Theme Park	4%
Best Park	1	Europa-Park	Rust, Germany	27%
Best Park	2	Cedar Point	Sandusky, Ohio	18%
Best Park	3	Dollywood	Pigeon Forge, Tennessee	11%
Best Park	4	Knoebels Amusement Resort	Elysburg, Pennsylvania	10%
Best Park	5	Disneyland	Anaheim, California	6%
Best Waterpark	1	Schlitterbahn New Braunfels	New Braunfels, Texas	57%
Best Waterpark	2	Holiday World and Splashin' Safari	Santa Claus, Indiana	17%
Best Waterpark	3	Universal's Volcano Bay Water Theme Park	Orlando, Florida	6%
Best Waterpark	4	Dollywood's Splash Country	Pigeon Forge, Tennessee	4%
Best Waterpark	5	Disney's Typhoon Lagoon	Orlando, Florida	3%
Best Children's Park	1	Idlewild and Soak Zone	Ligonier, Pennsylvania	19%
Best Children's Park	2	Storybook Land	Egg Harbor Township, New Jersey	11%
Best Children's Park	3	Story Land	Glen, New Hampshire	9%
Best Children's Park	4	Morgan's Wonderland	San Antonio, Texas	8%
Best Children's Park	5	Gilroy Gardens	Gilroy, California	7%
Best Children's Park	5	Legoland California	Carlsbad, California	7%
Best Children's Park	5	Legoland Florida	Winter Haven, Florida	7%
Best Marine Life Park	1	SeaWorld Orlando	Orlando, Florida	58%
Best Marine Life Park	2	SeaWorld San Diego	San Diego, California	10%
Best Marine Life Park	3	Discovery Cove	Orlando, Florida	8%
Best Marine Life Park	4	SeaWorld San Antonio	San Antonio, Texas	7%
Best Marine Life Park	5	Six Flags Discovery Kingdom	Vallejo, California	6%
Best Seaside Park	1	Santa Cruz Beach Boardwalk	Santa Cruz, California	31%
Best Seaside Park	2	Morey's Piers	Wildwood, New Jersey	26%
Best Seaside Park	3	Blackpool Pleasure Beach	Blackpool, England	25%
Best Seaside Park	4	Gröna Lund	Stockholm, Sweden	12%
Best Kids’ Area	1	Kings Island	Kings Mills, Ohio	23%
Best Kids’ Area	2	Universal's Islands of Adventure	Orlando, Florida	13%
Best Kids’ Area	3	Efteling	Kaatsheuvel, The Netherlands	10%
Best Kids’ Area	4	Europa-Park	Rust, Germany	9%
Best Kids’ Area	5	Paultons Park	Romsey, England	8%
Cleanest Park	1	Holiday World and Splashin' Safari	Santa Claus, Indiana	56%
Cleanest Park	2	Dollywood	Pigeon Forge, Tennessee	17%
Cleanest Park	3	Europa-Park	Rust, Germany	9%
Cleanest Park	4	Busch Gardens Williamsburg	Williamsburg, Virginia	7%
Cleanest Park	5	Magic Kingdom	Orlando, Florida	6%
Friendliest Park	1	Dollywood	Pigeon Forge, Tennessee	39%
Friendliest Park	2	Holiday World and Splashin' Safari	Santa Claus, Indiana	18%
Friendliest Park	3	Silver Dollar City	Branson, Missouri	12%
Friendliest Park	4	Knoebels Amusement Resort	Elysburg, Pennsylvania	11%
Friendliest Park	5	Alabama Splash Adventure	Bessemer, Alabama	10%
Best Shows	1	Dollywood	Pigeon Forge, Tennessee	46%
Best Shows	2	Six Flags Fiesta Texas	San Antonio, Texas	18%
Best Shows	3	Silver Dollar City	Branson, Missouri	5%
Best Shows	3	SeaWorld Orlando	Orlando, Florida	5%
Best Shows	5	Disney's Hollywood Studios	Orlando, Florida	4%
Best Landscaping	1	Busch Gardens Williamsburg	Williamsburg, Virginia	31%
Best Landscaping	2	Gilroy Gardens	Gilroy, California	15%
Best Landscaping	3	Efteling	Kaatsheuvel, The Netherlands	12%
Best Landscaping	4	Dollywood	Pigeon Forge, Tennessee	8%
Best Landscaping	5	Disney's Animal Kingdom	Orlando, Florida	6%
Best Food	1	Dollywood	Pigeon Forge, Tennessee	25%
Best Food	2	Knoebels Amusement Resort	Elysburg, Pennsylvania	23%
Best Food	3	Epcot	Orlando, Florida	17%
Best Food	4	Silver Dollar City	Branson, Missouri	11%
Best Food	5	Busch Gardens Williamsburg	Williamsburg, Virginia	5%
Best Carousel	1	Knoebels Amusement Resort	Elysburg, Pennsylvania	41%
Best Carousel	2	Santa Cruz Beach Boardwalk	Santa Cruz, California	20%
Best Carousel	3	Six Flags Over Georgia	Austell, Georgia	7%
Best Carousel	4	Six Flags Great America	Gurnee, Illinois	6%
Best Carousel	5	Efteling	Kaatsheuvel, The Netherlands	5.5%
Best Water Ride (Park)	1	Valhalla	Blackpool Pleasure Beach	24%
Best Water Ride (Park)	2	Dudley Do-Right's Ripsaw Falls	Universal's Islands of Adventure	18%
Best Water Ride (Park)	3	Chiapas	Phantasialand	8%
Best Water Ride (Park)	4	Splash Mountain	Magic Kingdom	7%
Best Water Ride (Park)	5	Jurassic Park River Adventure	Universal's Islands of Adventure	6%
Best Water Park Ride	1	Wildebeest	Holiday World and Splashin' Safari	47%
Best Water Park Ride	2	Mammoth	Holiday World and Splashin' Safari	18%
Best Water Park Ride	3	The Falls	Schlitterbahn New Braunfels	14%
Best Water Park Ride	4	Master Blaster	Schlitterbahn New Braunfels	8%
Best Water Park Ride	5	Massiv	Schlitterbahn Galveston Island	6%
Best Dark Ride	1	The Twilight Zone Tower of Terror	Disney's Hollywood Studios	16%
Best Dark Ride	2	Harry Potter and the Forbidden Journey	Universal's Islands of Adventure	10%
Best Dark Ride	3	Haunted Mansion	Knoebels Amusement Resort	9.5%
Best Dark Ride	4	The Amazing Adventures of Spider-Man	Universal's Islands of Adventure	9%
Best Dark Ride	5	Harry Potter and the Escape from Gringotts	Universal Studios Florida	8%
Best Indoor Roller Coaster	1	Revenge of the Mummy: The Ride	Universal Studios Florida	24%
Best Indoor Roller Coaster	2	Space Mountain	Disneyland	11%
Best Indoor Roller Coaster	3	Winja's Fear & Force	Phantasialand	10%
Best Indoor Roller Coaster	4	Black Diamond	Knoebels Amusement Resort	9.5%
Best Funhouse/Walk-Through	1	Noah's Ark	Kennywood	32%
Best Funhouse/Walk-Through	2	Ghost Ship	Morey's Piers	18%
Best Funhouse/Walk-Through	3	Frankenstein's Castle	Indiana Beach	12%
Best Funhouse/Walk-Through	4	Gasten Ghost Hotel	Liseberg	11%
Best Funhouse/Walk-Through	5	Lustiga Huset	Gröna Lund	10%
Best Halloween Event	1	Universal Orlando Resort	Orlando, Florida	26%
Best Halloween Event	2	Knott's Berry Farm	Buena Park, California	20%
Best Halloween Event	3	Knoebels Amusement Resort	Elysburg, Pennsylvania	10%
Best Halloween Event	4	Kennywood	West Mifflin, Pennsylvania	6%
Best Halloween Event	5	Busch Gardens Tampa Bay	Tampa, Florida	5%
Best Halloween Event	5	Six Flags Fiesta Texas	San Antonio, Texas	5%
Best Halloween Event	5	Universal Studios Hollywood	Hollywood, California	5%
Best Christmas Event	1	Dollywood	Pigeon Forge, Tennessee	47%
Best Christmas Event	2	Silver Dollar City	Branson, Missouri	9%
Best Christmas Event	3	Disneyland	Anaheim, California	7%
Best Christmas Event	3	Magic Kingdom	Orlando, Florida	7%
Best Christmas Event	5	Kennywood	West Mifflin, Pennsylvania	5%

Top 50 Steel Roller Coasters
Rank	2017 Recipient	Park	Supplier	Year	Points
1	Fury 325	Carowinds	B&M	2015	1,354
2	Millennium Force	Cedar Point	Intamin	2000	1,129
3	Superman the Ride	Six Flags New England	Intamin	2000	705
4	Iron Rattler	Six Flags Fiesta Texas	Dinn (rebuilt RMC)	1990 (rebuilt 2013)	657
5	Expedition GeForce	Holiday Park	Intamin	2001	575
6	Leviathan	Canada's Wonderland	B&M	2012	481
7	Nitro	Six Flags Great Adventure	B&M	2001	442
8	Diamondback	Kings Island	B&M	2009	381
9	New Texas Giant	Six Flags Over Texas	RCCA (rebuilt RMC)	1992 (rebuilt 2011)	379
10	Maverick	Cedar Point	Intamin	2007	375
11	Apollo's Chariot	Busch Gardens Williamsburg	B&M	1999	374
12	Phantom's Revenge	Kennywood	Arrow Dynamics (rebuilt Morgan)	1991 (rebuilt 2001)	344
13	Intimidator 305	Kings Dominion	Intamin	2010	330
14	Goliath	Six Flags Over Georgia	B&M	2006	291
14	Wicked Cyclone	Six Flags New England	Frontier Construction (rebuilt RMC)	1983 (rebuilt 2015)	291
16	Twisted Colossus	Six Flags Magic Mountain	International Amusement Devices (rebuilt RMC)	1978 (rebuilt 2015)	284
17	Top Thrill Dragster	Cedar Point	Intamin	2003	276
18	Blue Fire	Europa-Park	Mack Rides	2006	272
19	Intimidator	Carowinds	B&M	2010	261
20	Nemesis	Alton Towers	B&M	1994	254
21	Taron	Phantasialand	Intamin	2016	253
22	Banshee	Kings Island	B&M	2014	244
23	Magnum XL-200	Cedar Point	Arrow Dynamics	1989	238
24	Skyrush	Hersheypark	Intamin	2012	235
25	X2	Six Flags Magic Mountain	Arrow Dynamics	2002	217
26	Mind Bender	Six Flags Over Georgia	Schwarzkopf	1978	209
27	Montu	Busch Gardens Tampa Bay	B&M	1996	200
28	Behemoth	Canada's Wonderland	B&M	2008	184
29	Cheetah Hunt	Busch Gardens Tampa Bay	Intamin	2011	181
29	Helix	Liseberg	Mack Rides	2014	181
31	Mako	SeaWorld Orlando	B&M	2016	171
32	Cannibal	Lagoon		2015	163
33	Storm Chaser	Kentucky Kingdom	Martin & Vleminckx (rebuilt RMC)	1998 (rebuilt 2016)	135
34	Raging Bull	Six Flags Great America	B&M	1999	113
35	Black Mamba	Phantasialand	B&M	2006	109
36	Alpengeist	Busch Gardens Williamsburg	B&M	1997	104
37	Medusa Steel Coaster	Six Flags Mexico	CCI (rebuilt RMC)	2000 (Rebuilt 2014)	98
38	Quimera	La Feria	Schwarzkopf	2007	93
39	Thunderbird	Holiday World & Splashin' Safari	B&M	2015	91
40	Lisebergbanan	Liseberg	Schwarzkopf	1987	84
41	Goliath	La Ronde	B&M	2006	78
41	Kumba	Busch Gardens Tampa Bay	B&M	1996	78
41	Lightning Run	Kentucky Kingdom	Chance	2014	78
44	Steel Force	Dorney Park & Wildwater Kingdom	Morgan	1997	76
45	Euro-Mir	Europa-Park	Mack Rides	1997	72
46	Shock Wave	Six Flags Over Texas	Schwarzkopf	1978	68
46	Whizzer	Six Flags Great America	Schwarzkopf	1976	68
48	Griffon	Busch Gardens Williamsburg	B&M	2007	62
49	Expedition Everest	Disney's Animal Kingdom	Vekoma	2006	61
50	Full Throttle	Six Flags Magic Mountain	Premier Rides	2013	59

Top 50 Wood Roller Coasters
Rank	2017 Recipient	Park	Supplier	Year	Points
1	El Toro	Six Flags Great Adventure	Intamin	2006	1,241
2	Phoenix	Knoebels Amusement Resort	PTC	1985	1,212
3	Boulder Dash	Lake Compounce	CCI	2000	1,171
4	The Voyage	Holiday World & Splashin' Safari	The Gravity Group	2006	1,113
5	Lightning Rod	Dollywood	RMC	2016	710
6	The Beast	Kings Island		1979	666
7	Ravine Flyer II	Waldameer & Water World	The Gravity Group	2008	612
8	Thunderhead	Dollywood	GCII	2004	560
9	Outlaw Run	Silver Dollar City	RMC	2013	541
10	Gold Striker	California's Great America	GCII	2013	489
11	Mystic Timbers	Kings Island	GCII	2017	345
12	Lightning Racer	Hersheypark	GCII	2000	276
13	Goliath	Six Flags Great America	RMC	2014	269
14	Boardwalk Bullet	Kemah Boardwalk	Martin & Vleminckx	2007	236
15	Wodan - Timburcoaster	Europa-Park	GCII	2012	223
16	Balder	Liseberg	Intamin	2003	221
17	Thunderbolt	Kennywood	John Miller (rebuilt Andy Vettel)	1924 (rebuilt 1968)	220
18	GhostRider	Knott's Berry Farm	CCI	1998	219
18	Troy	Toverland	GCII	2007	219
18	White Lightning	Fun Spot America Orlando	GCII	2013	219
21	Rampage	Alabama Splash Adventure	CCI	1998	218
22	Cyclone	Luna Park	Harry C. Baker	1927	217
23	The Raven	Holiday World & Splashin' Safari	CCI	1995	214
24	The Legend	Holiday World & Splashin' Safari	CCI	2000	198
25	Shivering Timbers	Michigan's Adventure	CCI	1998	197
26	Jack Rabbit	Kennywood	Harry C. Baker	1921	188
27	Prowler	Worlds of Fun	GCII	2009	186
28	The Boss	Six Flags St. Louis	CCI	2000	183
29	Wildfire	Kolmården Wildlife Park	RMC	2016	177
30	The Cú Chulainn Coaster	Tayto Park	The Gravity Group	2015	168
31	Giant Dipper	Santa Cruz Beach Boardwalk	Arthur Looff	1924	167
32	The Comet	The Great Escape	PTC	1994	157
33	Switchback	ZDT's Amusement Park	The Gravity Group	2015	139
34	Colossos	Heide Park	Intamin	2001	129
35	Twister	Knoebels Amusement Resort		1999	119
36	Wild Mouse	Blackpool Pleasure Beach		1958	112
37	Blue Streak	Conneaut Lake Park	Ed Vettel	1938	109
38	Hades 360	Mt. Olympus Theme Park	The Gravity Group	1995	107
39	Coaster	Playland	Carl Phare/Walker LeRoy	1958	98
40	American Thunder	Six Flags St. Louis	GCII	2009	96
41	El Toro	Freizeitpark Plohn	GCII	2006	92
42	Blue Streak	Cedar Point	PTC	1964	87
43	Screamin' Eagle	Six Flags St. Louis	PTC	1976	86
44	Flying Turns	Knoebels Amusement Resort		2013	84
45	Wooden Warrior	Quassy Amusement Park	The Gravity Group	2011	82
46	Grizzly	Kings Dominion	Taft Broadcasting Company	1982	81
47	Tremors	Silverwood	CCI	1999	80
48	Grand National	Blackpool Pleasure Beach	Charles Paige	1935	75
49	Kentucky Rumbler	Beech Bend Park	GCII	2006	77
50	Twister	Gröna Lund	The Gravity Group	2011	66

=== 2016 winners ===
2016 Golden Ticket Awards
Host Park: Cedar Point The Amusement Today Golden Ticket Awards were announced on September 10, 2016.

Category	Rank	2016 Recipient	Location/Park	Vote
Best New Ride (Amusement Park)	1	Lightning Rod	Dollywood	20%
Best New Ride (Amusement Park)	2	Storm Chaser	Kentucky Kingdom	13%
Best New Ride (Amusement Park)	3	Mako	SeaWorld Orlando	11%
Best New Ride (Amusement Park)	4	Valravn	Cedar Point	9%
Best New Ride (Amusement Park)	5	Switchback	ZDT's Amusement Park	8%
Best New Ride (Water Park)	1	Massiv	Schlitterbahn Galveston Island	48%
Best New Ride (Water Park)	2	Blackbeard's Revenge	Carowinds	15%
Best New Ride (Water Park)	3	Cyclone Saucers	Beech Bend Park	13%
Best New Ride (Water Park)	3	Tropical Plunge	Kings Island	13%
Best New Ride (Water Park)	5	Wonambi	Raging Waves	6%
Best Park	1	Europa-Park	Rust, Germany	26%
Best Park	2	Cedar Point	Sandusky, Ohio	19%
Best Park	3	Dollywood	Pigeon Forge, Tennessee	11%
Best Park	4	Knoebels Amusement Resort	Elysburg, Pennsylvania	9%
Best Park	5	Universal's Islands of Adventure	Orlando, Florida	7%
Best Park	6	Blackpool Pleasure Beach	Blackpool, England	6%
Best Park	7	Busch Gardens Williamsburg	Williamsburg, Virginia	5%
Best Park	8	Phantasialand	Brühl, Germany	4.5%
Best Park	9	Alton Towers	Staffordshire, England	4%
Best Park	9	Tokyo DisneySea	Tokyo, Japan	4%
Best Waterpark	1	Schlitterbahn New Braunfels	New Braunfels, Texas	47%
Best Waterpark	2	Storybook Land	Egg Harbor Township, New Jersey	28%
Best Waterpark	3	Dollywood's Splash Country	Pigeon Forge, Tennessee	6%
Best Waterpark	4	Disney's Blizzard Beach	Orlando, Florida	5%
Best Waterpark	5	Aquatica Orlando	Orlando, Florida	4%
Best Children's Park	1	Idlewild and Soak Zone	Ligonier, Pennsylvania	23%
Best Children's Park	2	Storybook Land	Egg Harbor Township, New Jersey	12%
Best Children's Park	3	Legoland California	Carlsbad, California	10%
Best Children's Park	3	Story Land	Glen, New Hampshire	10%
Best Children's Park	5	Paultons Park	Romsey, England	9%
Best Marine Life Park	1	SeaWorld Orlando	Orlando, Florida	57%
Best Marine Life Park	2	SeaWorld San Diego	San Diego, California	10%
Best Marine Life Park	3	SeaWorld San Antonio	San Antonio, Texas	8%
Best Marine Life Park	4	Six Flags Discovery Kingdom	Vallejo, California	7%
Best Marine Life Park	5	Discovery Cove	Orlando, Florida	6.5%
Best Marine Life Park	5	Ocean Park	Hong Kong, China	6.5%
Best Seaside Park	1	Santa Cruz Beach Boardwalk	Santa Cruz, California	30%
Best Seaside Park	2	Blackpool Pleasure Beach	Blackpool, England	28%
Best Seaside Park	3	Morey's Piers	Wildwood, New Jersey	26%
Best Seaside Park	4	Gröna Lund	Stockholm, Sweden	12%
Best Seaside Park	5	Luna Park	Brooklyn, New York	4%
Best Kids’ Area	1	Kings Island	Kings Mills, Ohio	23%
Best Kids’ Area	2	Efteling	Kaatsheuvel, The Netherlands	13%
Best Kids’ Area	3	Paultons Park	Romsey, England	9%
Best Kids’ Area	4	Knott's Berry Farm	Buena Park, California	8%
Best Kids’ Area	5	Kings Dominion	Doswell, Virginia	7%
Best Kids’ Area	5	Nickelodeon Universe	Bloomington, Minnesota	7%
Cleanest Park	1	Holiday World & Splashin' Safari	Santa Claus, Indiana	26%
Cleanest Park	2	Dollywood	Pigeon Forge, Tennessee	19%
Cleanest Park	3	Europa-Park	Rust, Germany	7.5%
Cleanest Park	4	Disneyland	Anaheim, California	7%
Cleanest Park	5	Busch Gardens Williamsburg	Williamsburg, Virginia	6%
Friendliest Park	1	Dollywood	Pigeon Forge, Tennessee	45%
Friendliest Park	2	Holiday World & Splashin' Safari	Santa Claus, Indiana	15%
Friendliest Park	3	Silver Dollar City	Branson, Missouri	7%
Friendliest Park	4	Knoebels Amusement Resort	Elysburg, Pennsylvania	6%
Friendliest Park	5	Adventure Island	Southend-on-Sea, England	5%
Best Shows	1	Dollywood	Pigeon Forge, Tennessee	45%
Best Shows	2	Six Flags Fiesta Texas	San Antonio, Texas	15%
Best Shows	3	Silver Dollar City	Branson, Missouri	7%
Best Shows	4	Disney California Adventure	Anaheim, California	6%
Best Shows	5	Europa-Park	Rust, Germany	5%
Best Landscaping	1	Busch Gardens Williamsburg	Williamsburg, Virginia	27%
Best Landscaping	2	Gilroy Gardens	Gilroy, California	18%
Best Landscaping	3	Efteling	Kaatsheuvel, The Netherlands	15%
Best Landscaping	4	Dollywood	Pigeon Forge, Tennessee	7%
Best Landscaping	5	Epcot	Orlando, Florida	6%
Best Food	1	Knoebels Amusement Resort	Elysburg, Pennsylvania	23%
Best Food	2	Dollywood	Pigeon Forge, Tennessee	20%
Best Food	3	Epcot	Orlando, Florida	14%
Best Food	4	Silver Dollar City	Branson, Missouri	13%
Best Food	5	Europa-Park	Rust, Germany	8%
Best Carousel	1	Knoebels Amusement Resort	Elysburg, Pennsylvania	40%
Best Carousel	2	Santa Cruz Beach Boardwalk	Santa Cruz, California	22%
Best Carousel	3	Six Flags Great America	Gurnee, Illinois	7%
Best Carousel	4	Efteling	Kaatsheuvel, The Netherlands	6%
Best Carousel	5	Six Flags Over Georgia	Austell, Georgia	5%
Best Water Ride (Park)	1	Valhalla	Blackpool Pleasure Beach	27%
Best Water Ride (Park)	2	Dudley Do-Right's Ripsaw Falls	Universal's Islands of Adventure	20%
Best Water Ride (Park)	3	Chiapas	Phantasialand	7%
Best Water Ride (Park)	3	Popeye & Bluto's Bilge-Rat Barges	Universal's Islands of Adventure	7%
Best Water Ride (Park)	3	Splash Mountain	Magic Kingdom	7%
Best Water Ride (Park)	3	Timber Mountain Log Ride	Knott's Berry Farm	7%
Best Water Park Ride	1	Wildebeest	Holiday World & Splashin' Safari	40%
Best Water Park Ride	2	Mammoth	Holiday World & Splashin' Safari	18%
Best Water Park Ride	3	Master Blaster	Schlitterbahn New Braunfels	11%
Best Water Park Ride	4	The Falls	Schlitterbahn New Braunfels	6%
Best Dark Ride	1	The Twilight Zone Tower of Terror	Disney's Hollywood Studios	14%
Best Dark Ride	2	Harry Potter and the Forbidden Journey	Universal's Islands of Adventure	13.5%
Best Dark Ride	3	Harry Potter and the Escape from Gringotts	Universal Studios Florida	9%
Best Dark Ride	4	Haunted Mansion	Knoebels Amusement Resort	8%
Best Dark Ride	5	Radiator Springs Racers	Disney California Adventure	5%
Best Indoor Roller Coaster	1	Revenge of the Mummy: The Ride	Universal Studios Florida	24%
Best Indoor Roller Coaster	2	Space Mountain	Disneyland	16%
Best Indoor Roller Coaster	3	Winja's Fear & Force	Phantasialand	14%
Best Indoor Roller Coaster	4	Space Mountain	Magic Kingdom	11%
Best Indoor Roller Coaster	5	Black Diamond	Knoebels Amusement Resort	10%
Best Funhouse/Walk-Through	1	Noah's Ark	Kennywood	38%
Best Funhouse/Walk-Through	2	Ghost Ship	Morey's Piers	16%
Best Funhouse/Walk-Through	3	Gasten Ghost Hotel	Liseberg	14%
Best Funhouse/Walk-Through	4	Frankenstein's Castle	Indiana Beach	11%
Best Funhouse/Walk-Through	5	Lustiga Huset	Gröna Lund	9%
Best Halloween Event	1	Universal Orlando Resort	Orlando, Florida	27%
Best Halloween Event	2	Knott's Berry Farm	Buena Park, California	20%
Best Halloween Event	3	Knoebels Amusement Resort	Elysburg, Pennsylvania	13%
Best Halloween Event	4	Kennywood	West Mifflin, Pennsylvania	7%
Best Halloween Event	5	Busch Gardens Tampa Bay	Tampa, Florida	6%
Best Christmas Event	1	Dollywood	Pigeon Forge, Tennessee	41%
Best Christmas Event	2	Disneyland	Anaheim, California	9%
Best Christmas Event	3	Silver Dollar City	Branson, Missouri	8.5%
Best Christmas Event	4	Magic Kingdom	Orlando, Florida	7%
Best Christmas Event	5	Kennywood	West Mifflin, Pennsylvania	6%

Top 50 Steel Roller Coasters
Rank	2016 Recipient	Park	Supplier	Year	Points
1	Fury 325	Carowinds	B&M	2015	1,126
2	Millennium Force	Cedar Point	Intamin	2000	1,122
3	Superman the Ride	Six Flags New England	Intamin	2000	698
4	Expedition GeForce	Holiday Park	Intamin	2001	613
5	Nitro	Six Flags Great Adventure	B&M	2001	454
6	Apollo's Chariot	Busch Gardens Williamsburg	B&M	1999	397
7	Leviathan	Canada's Wonderland	B&M	2012	393
8	Intimidator	Carowinds	B&M	2010	350
9	Diamondback	Kings Island	B&M	2009	330
10	Phantom's Revenge	Kennywood	Arrow Dynamics (rebuilt Morgan)	1991 (rebuilt 2001)	329
11	Nemesis	Alton Towers	B&M	1994	311
12	Maverick	Cedar Point	Intamin	2007	306
13	Banshee	Kings Island	B&M	2014	286
14	Blue Fire	Europa-Park	Mack Rides	2006	283
15	Magnum XL-200	Cedar Point	Arrow Dynamics	1989	279
16	New Texas Giant	Six Flags Over Texas	RCCA (rebuilt RMC)	1992 (rebuilt 2011)	272
17	Intimidator 305	Kings Dominion	Intamin	2010	268
18	Wicked Cyclone	Six Flags New England	Frontier Construction (rebuilt RMC)	1983 (rebuilt 2015)	265
19	Top Thrill Dragster	Cedar Point	Intamin	2003	258
20	Goliath	Six Flags Over Georgia	B&M	2006	255
21	Iron Rattler	Six Flags Fiesta Texas	Dinn (rebuilt RMC)	1990 (rebuilt 2013)	254
22	Montu	Busch Gardens Tampa Bay	B&M	1996	203
23	X2	Six Flags Magic Mountain	Arrow Dynamics	2002	202
24	Behemoth	Canada's Wonderland	B&M	2008	198
25	Black Mamba	Phantasialand	B&M	2006	178
26	Twisted Colossus	Six Flags Magic Mountain	International Amusement Devices (rebuilt RMC)	1978 (rebuilt 2015)	175
27	Mind Bender	Six Flags Over Georgia	Schwarzkopf	1978	168
28	Storm Chaser	Kentucky Kingdom	Martin & Vleminckx (rebuilt RMC)	1998 (rebuilt 2016)	166
29	Helix	Liseberg	Mack Rides	2014	165
30	Alpengeist	Busch Gardens Williamsburg	B&M	1997	144
31	Goliath	La Ronde	B&M	2006	128
32	Raging Bull	Six Flags Great America	B&M	1999	122
32	Taron	Phantasialand	Intamin	2016	122
34	Thunderbird	Holiday World	B&M	2015	113
35	Mako	SeaWorld Orlando	B&M	2016	110
36	Wild Eagle	Dollywood	B&M	2012	107
37	Steel Force	Dorney Park & Wildwater Kingdom	Morgan	1997	105
38	Lisebergbanan	Liseberg	Schwarzkopf	1987	99
39	Cheetah Hunt	Busch Gardens Tampa Bay	Intamin	2011	97
40	Euro-Mir	Europa-Park	Mack Rides	1997	94
40	Medusa Steel Coaster	Six Flags Mexico	CCI (rebuilt RMC)	2000 (Rebuilt 2014)	94
42	Cannibal	Lagoon		2015	92
42	Kumba	Busch Gardens Tampa Bay	B&M	1993	92
44	Lightning Run	Kentucky Kingdom	Chance Rides	2014	90
45	Whizzer	Six Flags Great America	Schwarzkopf	1976	85
46	Olympia Looping	Wurstelprater	Schwarzkopf	1989	81
47	Raptor	Cedar Point	B&M	1994	80
48	Bizarro	Six Flags Great Adventure	B&M	1999	74
49	Expedition Everest	Disney's Animal Kingdom	Vekoma	2006	72
49	GateKeeper	Cedar Point	B&M	2013	72

Top 50 Wood Roller Coasters
Rank	2016 Recipient	Park	Supplier	Year	Points
1	Boulder Dash	Lake Compounce	CCI	2000	1,216
2	Phoenix	Knoebels Amusement Resort	PTC	1985	1,144
3	El Toro	Six Flags Great Adventure	Intamin	2006	1,121
4	The Voyage	Holiday World & Splashin' Safari	The Gravity Group	2006	1,028
5	Ravine Flyer II	Waldameer & Water World	The Gravity Group	2008	692
6	The Beast	Kings Island		1979	670
7	Thunderhead	Dollywood	GCII	2004	641
8	Outlaw Run	Silver Dollar City	RMC	2013	611
9	Gold Striker	California's Great America	GCII	2013	525
10	Lightning Racer	Hersheypark	GCII	2000	347
11	Lightning Rod	Dollywood	RMC	2016	336
12	Balder	Liseberg	Intamin	2003	292
13	Goliath	Six Flags Great America	RMC	2014	267
14	Prowler	Worlds of Fun	GCII	2009	256
15	The Raven	Holiday World & Splashin' Safari	CCI	1995	245
16	The Legend	Holiday World & Splashin' Safari	CCI	2000	241
17	Giant Dipper	Santa Cruz Beach Boardwalk	Arthur Looff	1924	233
18	Colossos	Heide Park	Intamin	2001	222
19	Shivering Timbers	Michigan's Adventure	CCI	1998	213
20	Jack Rabbit	Kennywood	Harry C. Baker	1921	208
21	Thunderbolt	Kennywood	John Miller (rebuilt Andy Vettel)	1924 (rebuilt 1968)	206
22	The Cú Chulainn Coaster	Tayto Park	The Gravity Group	2015	179
23	Wodan - Timburcoaster	Europa-Park	GCII	2012	175
24	Troy	Toverland	GCII	2007	174
25	The Comet	The Great Escape	PTC	1994	166
25	El Toro	Freizeitpark Plohn	GCII	2009	166
27	Cyclone	Luna Park	Harry C. Baker	1927	165
28	Wildfire	Kolmården Wildlife Park	RMC	2016	153
29	GhostRider	Knott's Berry Farm	CCI	1998	141
30	Coaster	Playland	Carl Phare/Walker LeRoy	1958	141
31	The Boss	Six Flags St. Louis	CCI	2000	140
32	Wild Mouse	Blackpool Pleasure Beach		1958	132
33	American Thunder	Six Flags St. Louis	GCII	2009	129
34	White Lightning	Fun Spot America	GCII	2013	128
35	Megafobia	Oakwood Theme Park	CCI	1996	122
36	Hades 360	Mt. Olympus Theme Park	The Gravity Group	1995	118
37	Rampage	Alabama Splash Adventure	CCI	1998	117
38	Blue Streak	Conneaut Lake Park	Ed Vettel	1938	116
39	Screamin' Eagle	Six Flags St. Louis	PTC	1976	116
40	Tremors	Silverwood	CCI	1999	115
41	Flying Turns	Knoebels Amusement Resort		2013	110
42	Blue Streak	Cedar Point	PTC	1964	103
43	Racer	Kennywood	Charles Mach	1927	94
44	T Express	Everland	Intamin	2008	84
45	Twister	Gröna Lund	The Gravity Group	2011	84
46	Wooden Warrior	Quassy Amusement Park	The Gravity Group	2011	81
47	Twister	Knoebels Amusement Resort		1999	78
48	Kentucky Rumbler	Beech Bend Park	GCII	2006	77
49	Wood Coaster	Knight Valley	GCII	2011	76
50	Boardwalk Bullet	Kemah Boardwalk	Martin & Vleminckx	2007	73

=== 2015 winners ===
2015 Golden Ticket Awards
Host Park: Coney Island The Amusement Today Golden Ticket Awards were announced on September 12, 2015.

Category	Rank	2015 Recipient	Location/Park	Vote
Best New Ride (Amusement Park)	1	Fury 325	Carowinds	27%
Best New Ride (Amusement Park)	2	Wicked Cyclone	Six Flags New England	14%
Best New Ride (Amusement Park)	3	Twisted Colossus	Six Flags Magic Mountain	13%
Best New Ride (Amusement Park)	4	The Cú Chulainn Coaster	Tayto Park	10%
Best New Ride (Amusement Park)	5	Thunderbird	Holiday World & Splashin' Safari	9.5%
Best New Ride (Water Park)	1	Dive Bomber	Six Flags White Water	15%
Best New Ride (Water Park)	2	Slidezilla	Elitch Gardens	14%
Best New Ride (Water Park)	3	Aqua Rocket	Raging Waters San Dimas	13%
Best New Ride (Water Park)	3	Slideboarding	Wet 'n' Wild Las Vegas	13%
Best New Ride (Water Park)	5	Anaconda	Kalahari Resort Poconos	10%
Best Park	1	Europa-Park	Rust, Germany	24%
Best Park	2	Cedar Point	Sandusky, Ohio	14%
Best Park	3	Knoebels Amusement Resort	Elysburg, Pennsylvania	11%
Best Park	4	Dollywood	Pigeon Forge, Tennessee	9%
Best Park	5	Disneyland	Anaheim, California	7%
Best Park	6	Blackpool Pleasure Beach	Blackpool, England	5%
Best Park	6	Busch Gardens Williamsburg	Williamsburg, Virginia	5%
Best Park	8	Universal's Islands of Adventure	Orlando, Florida	4.5%
Best Park	9	Alton Towers	Staffordshire, England	4%
Best Park	9	Holiday World & Splashin' Safari	Santa Claus, Indiana	4%
Best Park	9	Magic Kingdom	Orlando, Florida	4%
Best Park	9	Tokyo DisneySea	Tokyo, Japan	4%
Best Waterpark	1	Schlitterbahn New Braunfels	New Braunfels, Texas	52%
Best Waterpark	2	Holiday World & Splashin' Safari	Santa Claus, Indiana	19%
Best Waterpark	3	Dollywood's Splash Country	Pigeon Forge, Tennessee	6%
Best Waterpark	4	Aquatica Orlando	Orlando, Florida	5%
Best Waterpark	5	Disney's Typhoon Lagoon	Orlando, Florida	4%
Best Children's Park	1	Idlewild and Soak Zone	Ligonier, Pennsylvania	21%
Best Children's Park	2	Storybook Land	Egg Harbor Township, New Jersey	20%
Best Children's Park	3	Story Land	Glen, New Hampshire	9%
Best Children's Park	4	Legoland Windsor	Windsor, England	8%
Best Children's Park	5	Legoland California	Carlsbad, California	7%
Best Children's Park	5	Legoland Florida	Winter Haven, Florida	7%
Best Marine Life Park	1	SeaWorld Orlando	Orlando, Florida	55%
Best Marine Life Park	2	SeaWorld San Diego	San Diego, California	10%
Best Marine Life Park	3	Discovery Cove	Orlando, Florida	9%
Best Marine Life Park	4	SeaWorld San Antonio	San Antonio, Texas	8%
Best Marine Life Park	5	Six Flags Discovery Kingdom	Vallejo, California	7%
Best Seaside Park	1	Morey's Piers	Wildwood, New Jersey	27%
Best Seaside Park	2	Santa Cruz Beach Boardwalk	Santa Cruz, California	26.5%
Best Seaside Park	3	Blackpool Pleasure Beach	Blackpool, England	26%
Best Seaside Park	4	Grona Lund	Stockholm, Sweden	12%
Best Kids’ Area	1	Kings Island	Kings Mills, Ohio	27%
Best Kids’ Area	2	Efteling	Kaatsheuvel, The Netherlands	10%
Best Kids’ Area	3	Universal's Islands of Adventure	Orlando, Florida	9.5%
Best Kids’ Area	4	Kings Dominion	Doswell, Virginia	8%
Best Kids’ Area	5	Blackpool Pleasure Beach	Blackpool, England	6%
Best Kids’ Area	5	Nickelodeon Universe	Bloomington, Minnesota	6%
Cleanest Park	1	Holiday World & Splashin' Safari	Santa Claus, Indiana	25%
Cleanest Park	2	Dollywood	Pigeon Forge, Tennessee	14%
Cleanest Park	3	Busch Gardens Williamsburg	Williamsburg, Virginia	11%
Cleanest Park	4	Europa-Park	Rust, Germany	9%
Cleanest Park	5	Disneyland	Anaheim, California	8%
Friendliest Park	1	Dollywood	Pigeon Forge, Tennessee	35%
Friendliest Park	2	Holiday World & Splashin' Safari	Santa Claus, Indiana	18%
Friendliest Park	3	Knoebels Amusement Resort	Elysburg, Pennsylvania	12%
Friendliest Park	4	Adventure Island	Southend-on-Sea, England	9%
Friendliest Park	5	Silver Dollar City	Branson, Missouri	8%
Best Shows	1	Dollywood	Pigeon Forge, Tennessee	42%
Best Shows	2	Six Flags Fiesta Texas	San Antonio, Texas	11%
Best Shows	3	Silver Dollar City	Branson, Missouri	8%
Best Shows	4	Europa-Park	Rust, Germany	7%
Best Shows	5	Disney California Adventure	Anaheim, California	6%
Best Outdoor Show Production	1	IllumiNations: Reflections of Earth	Epcot	24%
Best Outdoor Show Production	2	World of Color	Disney California Adventure	15%
Best Outdoor Show Production	3	Fantasmic!	Disney's Hollywood Studios	12%
Best Outdoor Show Production	4	Fantasmic!	Disneyland	11%
Best Outdoor Show Production	5	Lone Star Nights	Six Flags Fiesta Texas	9%
Best Landscaping	1	Busch Gardens Williamsburg	Williamsburg, Virginia	29%
Best Landscaping	2	Gilroy Gardens	Gilroy, California	17%
Best Landscaping	3	Efteling	Kaatsheuvel, The Netherlands	11%
Best Landscaping	4	Alton Towers	Staffordshire, England	9%
Best Landscaping	5	Dollywood	Pigeon Forge, Tennessee	7%
Best Food	1	Knoebels Amusement Resort	Elysburg, Pennsylvania	23%
Best Food	2	Dollywood	Pigeon Forge, Tennessee	20%
Best Food	3	Epcot	Orlando, Florida	16%
Best Food	4	Silver Dollar City	Branson, Missouri	9%
Best Food	5	Europa-Park	Rust, Germany	7%
Best Carousel	1	Knoebels Amusement Resort	Elysburg, Pennsylvania	42%
Best Carousel	2	Santa Cruz Beach Boardwalk	Santa Cruz, California	23%
Best Carousel	3	Six Flags Great America	Gurnee, Illinois	6%
Best Carousel	4	Efteling	Kaatsheuvel, The Netherlands	5%
Best Carousel	4	Six Flags Over Georgia	Austell, Georgia	5%
Best Water Ride (Park)	1	Valhalla	Blackpool Pleasure Beach	28%
Best Water Ride (Park)	2	Dudley Do-Right's Ripsaw Falls	Universal's Islands of Adventure	19%
Best Water Ride (Park)	3	Splash Mountain	Magic Kingdom	9%
Best Water Ride (Park)	4	Mountain Slidewinder	Dollywood	7%
Best Water Ride (Park)	5	Timber Mountain Log Ride	Knott's Berry Farm	6%
Best Water Park Ride	1	Wildebeest	Holiday World & Splashin' Safari	25%
Best Water Park Ride	2	Mammoth	Holiday World & Splashin' Safari	18%
Best Water Park Ride	3	Master Blaster	Schlitterbahn	14%
Best Water Park Ride	4	The Falls	Schlitterbahn	9%
Best Water Park Ride	5	Verrückt	Schlitterbahn Kansas City	8%
Best Dark Ride	1	Harry Potter and the Forbidden Journey	Universal's Islands of Adventure	13%
Best Dark Ride	2	Twilight Zone Tower of Terror	Disney's Hollywood Studios	12%
Best Dark Ride	3	Harry Potter and the Escape from Gringotts	Universal Studios Florida	9%
Best Dark Ride	4	The Amazing Adventures of Spider-Man	Universal's Islands of Adventure	8.5%
Best Dark Ride	5	Haunted Mansion	Knoebels Amusement Resort	7%
Best Indoor Water Park	1	Schlitterbahn Galveston Island	Galveston, Texas	28%
Best Indoor Water Park	2	Kalahari Resort Ohio	Sandusky, Ohio	17%
Best Indoor Water Park	3	Kalahari Resort Wisconsin	Wisconsin Dells, Wisconsin	12%
Best Indoor Water Park	4	World Waterpark	Edmonton, Alberta, Canada	11%
Best Indoor Water Park	5	Splash Landings	Staffordshire, England	6%
Best Indoor Roller Coaster	1	Revenge of the Mummy: The Ride	Universal Studios Florida	23%
Best Indoor Roller Coaster	2	Space Mountain	Disneyland	12%
Best Indoor Roller Coaster	3	Winja's Fear & Force	Phantasialand	11%
Best Indoor Roller Coaster	4	Black Diamond (roller coaster)	Knoebels Amusement Resort	10%
Best Indoor Roller Coaster	5	Mindbender	Galaxyland	7%
Best Indoor Roller Coaster	5	Rock 'n' Roller Coaster Starring Aerosmith	Disney's Hollywood Studios	7%
Best Funhouse/Walk-Through	1	Noah's Ark	Kennywood	27%
Best Funhouse/Walk-Through	2	Ghost Ship	Morey's Piers	23%
Best Funhouse/Walk-Through	3	Gasten Ghost Hotel	Liseberg	12%
Best Funhouse/Walk-Through	4	Frankenstein's Castle	Indiana Beach	10%
Best Funhouse/Walk-Through	5	Lustiga Huset	Grona Lund	8%
Best Halloween Event	1	Universal Orlando Resort	Orlando, Florida	28%
Best Halloween Event	2	Knott's Berry Farm	Buena Park, California	18%
Best Halloween Event	3	Knoebels Amusement Resort	Elysburg, Pennsylvania	11%
Best Halloween Event	4	Kennywood	West Mifflin, Pennsylvania	8%
Best Halloween Event	5	Busch Gardens Tampa Bay	Tampa, Florida	5%
Best Christmas Event	1	Dollywood	Pigeon Forge, Tennessee	40%
Best Christmas Event	2	Disneyland	Anaheim, California	10%
Best Christmas Event	3	Silver Dollar City	Branson, Missouri	9%
Best Christmas Event	4	Magic Kingdom	Orlando, Florida	6%
Best Christmas Event	5	Europa-Park	Rust, Germany	5.5%

Top 50 Steel Roller Coasters
Rank	2015 Recipient	Park	Supplier	Year	Points
1	Millennium Force	Cedar Point	Intamin	2000	1,205
2	Bizarro	Six Flags New England	Intamin	2000	929
3	Expedition GeForce	Holiday Park	Intamin	2001	714
4	Fury 325	Carowinds	B&M	2015	671
5	Nitro	Six Flags Great Adventure	B&M	2001	650
6	Apollo's Chariot	Busch Gardens Williamsburg	B&M	1999	597
7	Intimidator	Carowinds	B&M	2010	499
8	Leviathan	Canada's Wonderland	B&M	2012	491
9	Nemesis	Alton Towers	B&M	1994	462
10	New Texas Giant	Six Flags Over Texas	RCCA (rebuilt RMC)	1992 (rebuilt 2011)	450
11	Diamondback	Kings Island	B&M	2009	440
12	Goliath	Six Flags Over Georgia	B&M	2006	427
13	Top Thrill Dragster	Cedar Point	Intamin	2003	408
14	Phantom's Revenge	Kennywood	Arrow Dynamics (rebuilt Morgan)	1991 (rebuilt 2001)	405
15	Magnum XL-200	Cedar Point	Arrow Dynamics	1989	355
16	Intimidator 305	Kings Dominion	Intamin	2010	315
17	Blue Fire	Europa-Park	Mack Rides	2009	302
18	Behemoth	Canada's Wonderland	B&M	2008	301
19	Iron Rattler	Six Flags Fiesta Texas	Dinn (rebuilt RMC)	1990 (rebuilt 2013)	294
20	Banshee	Kings Island	B&M	2014	275
20	X2	Six Flags Magic Mountain	Arrow Dynamics	2002	275
22	Maverick	Cedar Point	Intamin	2007	257
23	Wicked Cyclone	Six Flags New England	Frontier Construction (rebuilt RMC)	1983 (rebuilt 2015)	251
24	Montu	Busch Gardens Tampa Bay	B&M	1996	238
25	Skyrush	Hersheypark	Intamin	2012	219
26	Alpengeist	Busch Gardens Williamsburg	B&M	1997	207
27	Mind Bender	Six Flags Over Georgia	Schwarzkopf	1978	200
28	Twisted Colossus	Six Flags Magic Mountain	International Amusement Devices (rebuilt RMC)	1978 (rebuilt 2015)	193
29	Black Mamba	Phantasialand	B&M	2006	179
30	The Swarm	Thorpe Park	B&M	2012	154
31	Raging Bull	Six Flags Great America	B&M	1999	138
31	Wild Eagle	Dollywood	B&M	2012	138
33	Griffon	Busch Gardens Williamsburg	B&M	2007	136
34	Helix	Liseberg	Mack Rides	2014	127
35	Lisebergbanan	Liseberg	Schwarzkopf	1987	114
36	Goliath	La Ronde	B&M	2006	110
37	Cheetah Hunt	Busch Gardens Tampa Bay	Intamin	2011	109
38	Air	Alton Towers	B&M	2002	108
38	Kumba	Busch Gardens Tampa Bay	B&M	1993	108
38	Lightning Run	Kentucky Kingdom	Chance Rides	2014	108
41	Shock Wave	Six Flags Over Texas	Schwarzkopf	1978	107
42	SheiKra	Busch Gardens Tampa Bay	B&M	2005	105
43	Manta	SeaWorld Orlando	B&M	2009	101
44	Bizarro	Six Flags Great Adventure	B&M	1999	96
45	Steel Force	Dorney Park & Wildwater Kingdom	Morgan	1998	92
46	Whizzer	Six Flags Great America	Schwarzkopf	1976	90
47	Expedition Everest	Disney's Animal Kingdom	Vekoma	2006	89
48	Olympia Looping	R. Barth & Sohn KB	Schwarzkopf	1989	86
49	Kingda Ka	Six Flags Great Adventure	Intamin	2005	83
49	Medusa Steel Coaster	Six Flags Mexico	CCI (rebuilt RMC)	2000 (Rebuilt 2014)	83

Top 50 Wooden Roller Coasters
Rank	2015 Recipient	Park	Supplier	Year	Points
1	Boulder Dash	Lake Compounce	CCI	2000	1,625
2	El Toro	Six Flags Great Adventure	Intamin	2006	1,464
3	Phoenix	Knoebels Amusement Resort	PTC	1985	1,301
4	The Voyage	Holiday World & Splashin' Safari	The Gravity Group	2006	1,184
5	Thunderhead	Dollywood	GCII	2004	904
6	The Beast	Kings Island		1979	740
7	Ravine Flyer II	Waldameer & Water World	The Gravity Group	2008	722
8	Outlaw Run	Silver Dollar City	RMC	2013	637
9	Gold Striker	California's Great America	GCII	2013	560
10	Lightning Racer	Hersheypark	GCII	2000	421
11	Balder	Liseberg	Intamin	2003	391
12	The Raven	Holiday World & Splashin' Safari	CCI	1995	286
13	Giant Dipper	Santa Cruz Beach Boardwalk	Arthur Looff	1924	278
14	Goliath	Six Flags Great America	RMC	2014	269
15	Thunderbolt	Kennywood	John Miller (rebuilt Andy Vettel)	1924 (rebuilt 1968)	265
16	Cyclone	Luna Park	Harry C. Baker	1927	242
17	Prowler	Worlds of Fun	GCII	2009	231
18	Troy	Toverland	GCII	2007	231
19	The Cú Chulainn Coaster	Tayto Park	The Gravity Group	2015	228
20	Shivering Timbers	Michigan's Adventure	CCI	1998	219
21	Flying Turns	Knoebels Amusement Resort		2013	211
21	Jack Rabbit	Kennywood	Harry C. Baker	1921	211
23	Colossos	Heide Park	Intamin	2001	207
24	The Comet	Great Escape	PTC	1994	198
25	The Legend	Holiday World & Splashin' Safari	CCI	2000	193
26	Wild Mouse	Blackpool Pleasure Beach		1958	185
27	Megafobia	Oakwood Theme Park	CCI	1996	171
28	Rampage	Alabama Splash Adventure	CCI	1998	167
29	Wodan - Timburcoaster	Europa-Park	GCII	2012	158
30	Coaster	Playland	Carl Phare/Walker LeRoy	1958	157
31	Hades 360	Mount Olympus Water & Theme Park	The Gravity Group	2005	156
32	Tremors	Silverwood Theme Park	CCI	1999	152
33	Kentucky Rumbler	Beech Bend Park	GCII	2006	149
34	Grand National	Blackpool Pleasure Beach	Charles Paige	1935	140
35	Blue Streak	Cedar Point	PTC	1964	133
35	Blue Streak	Conneaut Lake Park	Ed Vettel	1938	133
37	El Toro	Freizeitpark Plohn	GCII	2009	132
38	Wooden Warrior	Quassy Amusement Park	The Gravity Group	2011	130
39	American Thunder	Six Flags St. Louis	GCII	2008	123
40	White Lightning	Fun Spot America	GCII	2013	115
41	Twister	Knoebels Amusement Resort		1999	98
42	The Boss	Six Flags St. Louis	CCI	2000	91
43	Boardwalk Bullet	Kemah Boardwalk	Martin & Vleminckx	2007	88
44	Twister	Grona Lund	The Gravity Group	2011	83
45	Comet	Hersheypark	PTC	1946	78
45	Zippin Pippin	Bay Beach Amusement Park	John Miller (rebuilt The Gravity Group)	1912 (rebuilt 2011)	78
47	T Express	Everland	Intamin	2008	74
48	Big Dipper	Blackpool Pleasure Beach	John Miller	1923	70
48	Tonnerre de Zeus	Parc Astérix	CCI	1997	70
50	Racer	Kennywood	Charles Mach	1927	69

=== 2014 winners ===
2014 Golden Ticket Awards
Host Park: SeaWorld San Diego The Amusement Today Golden Ticket Awards were announced at a ceremony on September 5, 2014.

Category	Rank	2014 Recipient	Location/Park	Vote
Best New Ride (Amusement Park)	1	Flying Turns	Knoebels Amusement Resort	27%
Best New Ride (Amusement Park)	2	Banshee	Kings Island	19%
Best New Ride (Amusement Park)	3	Goliath	Six Flags Great America	11%
Best New Ride (Amusement Park)	4	Harry Potter and the Escape from Gringotts	Universal Studios Florida	10%
Best New Ride (Amusement Park)	5	Lightning Run	Kentucky Kingdom	9%
Best New Ride (Water Park)	1	Verrückt	Schlitterbahn Kansas City	59%
Best New Ride (Water Park)	2	Colossal Curl	Water Country USA	11%
Best New Ride (Water Park)	3	Bahama Blasters	Six Flags Fiesta Texas	10%
Best New Ride (Water Park)	4	Deep Water Dive	Kentucky Kingdom	8%
Best New Ride (Water Park)	5	Snake Pit	Dorney Park & Wildwater Kingdom	4%
Best Park	1	Europa-Park	Rust, Germany	25%
Best Park	2	Cedar Point	Sandusky, Ohio	16%
Best Park	3	Dollywood	Pigeon Forge, Tennessee	9%
Best Park	4	Knoebels Amusement Resort	Elysburg, Pennsylvania	8%
Best Park	5	Disneyland	Anaheim, California	8%
Best Park	6	Universal's Islands of Adventure	Orlando, Florida	5%
Best Park	7	Magic Kingdom	Orlando, Florida	4%
Best Park	7	Tokyo DisneySea	Tokyo, Japan	4%
Best Park	9	Busch Gardens Williamsburg	Williamsburg, Virginia	3.5%
Best Park	10	Holiday World & Splashin' Safari	Santa Claus, Indiana	3%
Best Waterpark	1	Schlitterbahn New Braunfels	New Braunfels, Texas	55%
Best Waterpark	2	Holiday World & Splashin' Safari	Santa Claus, Indiana	17%
Best Waterpark	3	Dollywood's Splash Country	Pigeon Forge, Tennessee	5%
Best Waterpark	4	Disney's Blizzard Beach	Orlando, Florida	4.5%
Best Waterpark	5	Disney's Typhoon Lagoon	Orlando, Florida	4%
Best Children's Park	1	Idlewild and Soak Zone	Ligonier, Pennsylvania	34%
Best Children's Park	2	Story Land	Glen, New Hampshire	13%
Best Children's Park	3	Legoland California	Carlsbad, California	12.5%
Best Children's Park	4	Legoland Florida	Winter Haven, Florida	10%
Best Children's Park	5	Enchanted Forest	Turner, Oregon	5%
Best Children's Park	5	Santa's Village	Jefferson, New Hampshire	5%
Best Marine Life Park	1	SeaWorld Orlando	Orlando, Florida	52%
Best Marine Life Park	2	SeaWorld San Diego	San Diego, California	12%
Best Marine Life Park	3	Discovery Cove	Orlando, Florida	10%
Best Marine Life Park	4	Six Flags Discovery Kingdom	Vallejo, California	9%
Best Marine Life Park	5	SeaWorld San Antonio	San Antonio, Texas	8%
Best Seaside Park	1	Santa Cruz Beach Boardwalk	Santa Cruz, California	45%
Best Seaside Park	2	Blackpool Pleasure Beach	Blackpool, England	16%
Best Seaside Park	3	Grona Lund	Stockholm, Sweden	15%
Best Seaside Park	4	Morey's Piers	Wildwood, New Jersey	12%
Best Seaside Park	5	Belmont Park	San Diego, California	4%
Best Kids’ Area	1	Kings Island	Kings Mills, Ohio	26%
Best Kids’ Area	2	Efteling	Kaatsheuvel, The Netherlands	13%
Best Kids’ Area	3	Knott's Berry Farm	Buena Park, California	10%
Best Kids’ Area	4	Universal's Islands of Adventure	Orlando, Florida	9.5%
Best Kids’ Area	5	Nickelodeon Universe	Bloomington, Minnesota	9%
Cleanest Park	1	Holiday World & Splashin' Safari	Santa Claus, Indiana	23%
Cleanest Park	2	Dollywood	Pigeon Forge, Tennessee	13%
Cleanest Park	3	Disneyland	Anaheim, California	12%
Cleanest Park	4	Europa-Park	Rust, Germany	10%
Cleanest Park	5	Busch Gardens Williamsburg	Williamsburg, Virginia	9%
Friendliest Park	1	Dollywood	Pigeon Forge, Tennessee	39%
Friendliest Park	2	Holiday World & Splashin' Safari	Santa Claus, Indiana	14%
Friendliest Park	3	Silver Dollar City	Branson, Missouri	11%
Friendliest Park	4	Knoebels Amusement Resort	Elysburg, Pennsylvania	6%
Friendliest Park	5	Disneyland	Anaheim, California	5%
Best Shows	1	Dollywood	Pigeon Forge, Tennessee	45%
Best Shows	2	Six Flags Fiesta Texas	San Antonio, Texas	12%
Best Shows	3	Europa-Park	Rust, Germany	8%
Best Shows	4	Silver Dollar City	Branson, Missouri	6.5%
Best Shows	5	Disney California Adventure	Anaheim, California	6%
Best Outdoor Show Production	1	IllumiNations: Reflections of Earth	Epcot	27%
Best Outdoor Show Production	2	World of Color	Disney California Adventure	19%
Best Outdoor Show Production	3	Fantasmic!	Disneyland	11%
Best Outdoor Show Production	4	Lone Star Nights	Six Flags Fiesta Texas	10%
Best Outdoor Show Production	5	Fantasmic!	Disney's Hollywood Studios	9%
Best Landscaping	1	Busch Gardens Williamsburg	Williamsburg, Virginia	24%
Best Landscaping	2	Gilroy Gardens	Gilroy, California	23%
Best Landscaping	3	Efteling	Kaatsheuvel, The Netherlands	17%
Best Landscaping	4	Dollywood	Pigeon Forge, Tennessee	6%
Best Landscaping	5	Epcot	Orlando, Florida	5%
Best Food	1	Dollywood	Pigeon Forge, Tennessee	21%
Best Food	2	Knoebels Amusement Resort	Elysburg, Pennsylvania	18%
Best Food	3	Epcot	Orlando, Florida	17.5%
Best Food	4	Silver Dollar City	Branson, Missouri	13%
Best Food	5	Europa-Park	Rust, Germany	7%
Best Carousel	1	Knoebels Amusement Resort	Elysburg, Pennsylvania	40%
Best Carousel	2	Santa Cruz Beach Boardwalk	Santa Cruz, California	27%
Best Carousel	3	Six Flags Great America	Gurnee, Illinois	5.5%
Best Carousel	4	Kennywood	West Mifflin, Pennsylvania	5%
Best Carousel	5	Phantasialand	Bruhl, Germany	
Best Water Ride (Park)	1	Dudley Do-Right's Ripsaw Falls	Universal's Islands of Adventure	21%
Best Water Ride (Park)	2	Valhalla	Blackpool Pleasure Beach	12%
Best Water Ride (Park)	3	Splash Mountain	Disneyland	11%
Best Water Ride (Park)	4	Timber Mountain Log Ride	Knott's Berry Farm	10.5%
Best Water Ride (Park)	5	Mountain Slidewinder	Dollywood	9%
Best Water Park Ride	1	Wildebeest	Holiday World & Splashin' Safari	23%
Best Water Park Ride	2	Master Blaster	Schlitterbahn	16%
Best Water Park Ride	3	Mammoth	Holiday World & Splashin' Safari	15%
Best Water Park Ride	4	The Falls	Schlitterbahn	7%
Best Water Park Ride	5	Congo River Expedition	Schlitterbahn	8%
Best Water Park Ride	5	Verrückt	Schlitterbahn Kansas City	8%
Best Dark Ride	1	Harry Potter and the Forbidden Journey	Universal's Islands of Adventure	20%
Best Dark Ride	2	Twilight Zone Tower of Terror	Disney's Hollywood Studios	10.5%
Best Dark Ride	3	Radiator Springs Racers	Disney California Adventure	10%
Best Dark Ride	4	The Amazing Adventures of Spider-Man	Universal's Islands of Adventure	9%
Best Dark Ride	4	Haunted Mansion	Knoebels Amusement Resort	9%
Best Indoor Water Park	1	Schlitterbahn Galveston Island	Galveston, Texas	25%
Best Indoor Water Park	2	Kalahari Resort	Sandusky, Ohio	19%
Best Indoor Water Park	3	World Waterpark	Edmonton, Alberta, Canada	12%
Best Indoor Water Park	4	Kalahari Resort	Wisconsin Dells, Wisconsin	9%
Best Indoor Water Park	5	Splash Landings	Staffordshire, England	8%
Best Indoor Roller Coaster	1	Revenge of the Mummy: The Ride	Universal Studios Florida	21%
Best Indoor Roller Coaster	2	Space Mountain	Disneyland	14%
Best Indoor Roller Coaster	3	Winja's Fear & Force	Phantasialand	12%
Best Indoor Roller Coaster	4	Black Diamond	Knoebels Amusement Resort	9%
Best Indoor Roller Coaster	5	Mindbender	Galaxyland	8.5%
Best Funhouse/Walk-Through	1	Noah's Ark	Kennywood	32%
Best Funhouse/Walk-Through	2	Frankenstein's Castle	Indiana Beach	17%
Best Funhouse/Walk-Through	3	Gasten Ghost Hotel	Liseberg	15%
Best Funhouse/Walk-Through	4	Ghost Ship	Morey's Piers	12%
Best Funhouse/Walk-Through	5	Lustiga Juset	Grona Lund	11%
Best Halloween Event	1	Universal Orlando Resort	Orlando, Florida	28%
Best Halloween Event	2	Knott's Berry Farm	Buena Park, California	20%
Best Halloween Event	3	Knoebels Amusement Resort	Elysburg, Pennsylvania	14%
Best Halloween Event	4	Kennywood	West Mifflin, Pennsylvania	9%
Best Halloween Event	5	Cedar Point	Sandusky, Ohio	6%
Best Christmas Event	1	Dollywood	Pigeon Forge, Tennessee	41%
Best Christmas Event	2	Disneyland	Anaheim, California	10%
Best Christmas Event	3	Silver Dollar City	Branson, Missouri	9.5%
Best Christmas Event	4	Magic Kingdom	Orlando, Florida	9%
Best Christmas Event	5	Kennywood	West Mifflin, Pennsylvania	7%

Top 50 Steel Roller Coasters
Rank	2014 Recipient	Park	Supplier	Year	Points
1	Millennium Force	Cedar Point	Intamin	2000	1,139
2	Bizarro	Six Flags New England	Intamin	2000	1,049
3	Expedition GeForce	Holiday Park	Intamin	2001	764
4	Diamondback	Kings Island	B&M	2009	579
5	Nitro	Six Flags Great Adventure	B&M	2001	563
6	Leviathan	Canada's Wonderland	B&M	2012	500
7	Apollo's Chariot	Busch Gardens Williamsburg	B&M	1999	484
8	New Texas Giant	Six Flags Over Texas	RCCA (rebuilt RMC)	1992 (rebuilt 2011)	465
9	Goliath	Six Flags Over Georgia	B&M	2006	422
10	Intimidator	Carowinds	B&M	2010	387
11	Phantom's Revenge	Kennywood	Arrow Dynamics (rebuilt Morgan)	1991 (rebuilt 2001)	384
12	Iron Rattler	Six Flags Fiesta Texas	Dinn (rebuilt RMC)	1990 (rebuilt 2013)	367
13	Magnum XL-200	Cedar Point	Arrow Dynamics	1989	366
13	Intimidator 305	Kings Dominion	Intamin	2010	366
15	Behemoth	Canada's Wonderland	B&M	2008	318
16	Banshee	Kings Island	B&M	2014	317
17	Blue Fire	Europa-Park	Mack Rides	2009	304
18	X2	Six Flags Magic Mountain	Arrow Dynamics	2002	292
19	Top Thrill Dragster	Cedar Point	Intamin	2003	273
20	Mind Bender	Six Flags Over Georgia	Schwarzkopf	1978	249
21	Nemesis	Alton Towers	B&M	1994	245
22	Montu	Busch Gardens Tampa Bay	B&M	1996	229
23	Alpengeist	Busch Gardens Williamsburg	B&M	1997	220
24	Black Mamba	Phantasialand	B&M	2006	179
25	Lightning Run	Kentucky Kingdom	Chance Rides	2014	165
26	Goliath	La Ronde	B&M	2006	157
26	Skyrush	Hersheypark	Intamin	2012	157
28	Maverick	Cedar Point	Intamin	2007	138
28	Wild Eagle	Dollywood	B&M	2012	138
30	Helix	Liseberg	Mack Rides	2014	134
31	Raging Bull	Six Flags Great America	B&M	1999	124
32	GateKeeper	Cedar Point	B&M	2013	117
33	Griffon	Busch Gardens Williamsburg	B&M	2007	116
34	Tatsu	Six Flags Magic Mountain	B&M	2006	115
35	Lisebergbanan	Liseberg	Schwarzkopf	1987	113
36	Kumba	Busch Gardens Tampa Bay	B&M	1993	110
37	Steel Force	Dorney Park & Wildwater Kingdom	Morgan	1998	106
38	SheiKra	Busch Gardens Tampa Bay	B&M	2005	101
39	Full Throttle	Six Flags Magic Mountain	Premier Rides	2013	95
40	Shock Wave	Six Flags Over Texas	Schwarzkopf	1978	90
41	Manta	SeaWorld Orlando	B&M	2009	87
42	Euro-Mir	Europa-Park	Mack Rides	1997	81
43	Goliath	Six Flags Magic Mountain	Giovanola	2000	79
44	Whizzer	Six Flags Great America	Schwarzkopf	1976	77
45	Kingda Ka	Six Flags Great Adventure	Intamin	2005	76
46	Piraten	Djurs Sommerland	Intamin	2008	74
47	Raptor	Cedar Point	B&M	1994	73
48	Cheetah Hunt	Busch Gardens Tampa Bay	Intamin	2011	71
49	California Screamin'	Disney California Adventure	Intamin	2001	70
49	Volcano, The Blast Coaster	Kings Dominion	Intamin	1998	70

Top 50 Wooden Roller Coasters
Rank	2014 Recipient	Park	Supplier	Year	Points
1	Boulder Dash	Lake Compounce	CCI	2000	1,480
2	El Toro	Six Flags Great Adventure	Intamin	2006	1,291
3	The Voyage	Holiday World & Splashin' Safari	The Gravity Group	2006	1,129
4	Phoenix	Knoebels Amusement Resort	PTC	1985	1,036
5	Thunderhead	Dollywood	GCII	2004	837
6	Ravine Flyer II	Waldameer & Water World	The Gravity Group	2008	719
7	Gold Striker	California's Great America	GCII	2013	619
8	The Beast	Kings Island		1979	614
9	Outlaw Run	Silver Dollar City	RMC	2013	605
10	Balder	Liseberg	Intamin	2003	393
11	Lightning Racer	Hersheypark	GCII	2000	342
12	Prowler	Worlds of Fun	GCII	2009	302
13	The Raven	Holiday World & Splashin' Safari	CCI	1995	298
14	Thunderbolt	Kennywood	John Miller (rebuilt Andy Vettel)	1924 (rebuilt 1968)	270
15	Shivering Timbers	Michigan's Adventure	CCI	1998	264
16	Troy	Toverland	GCII	2007	260
17	Giant Dipper	Santa Cruz Beach Boardwalk	Arthur Looff	1924	238
18	The Comet	Great Escape	PTC	1994	211
19	Jack Rabbit	Kennywood	Harry C. Baker	1921	204
20	Kentucky Rumbler	Beech Bend Park	GCII	2006	203
21	Wodan - Timburcoaster	Europa-Park	GCII	2012	200
22	Cyclone	Luna Park	Harry C. Baker	1927	177
23	Goliath	Six Flags Great America	RMC	2014	166
24	Colossos	Heide Park	Intamin	2001	162
25	Flying Turns	Knoebels Amusement Resort		2013	155
26	Hades 360	Mt. Olympus Water & Theme Park	The Gravity Group	2005	143
27	The Legend	Holiday World & Splashin' Safari	CCI	2000	137
28	Wooden Warrior	Quassy Amusement Park	The Gravity Group	2011	122
29	El Toro	Freizeitpark Plohn	GCII	2009	119
30	Blue Streak	Conneaut Lake Park	Ed Vettel	1938	117
31	American Thunder	Six Flags St. Louis	GCII	2008	114
32	Grand National	Blackpool Pleasure Beach	Charles Paige	1935	110
33	Megafobia	Oakwood Theme Park	CCI	1996	108
34	Tremors	Silverwood Theme Park	CCI	1999	105
35	Blue Streak	Cedar Point	PTC	1964	104
35	Boardwalk Bullet	Kemah Boardwalk	Martin & Vleminckx	2007	104
37	Coaster	Playland	Carl Phare/Walker LeRoy	1958	103
38	Apocalypse	Six Flags Magic Mountain	GCII	2009	101
38	White Lightning	Fun Spot America	GCII	2013	101
40	Twister	Knoebels Amusement Resort		1999	100
41	Rutschebanen	Tivoli Gardens	Valdemar Lebech	1915	98
42	Racer	Kennywood	Charles Mach	1927	96
43	Wild Mouse	Blackpool Pleasure Beach		1958	95
44	GhostRider	Knott's Berry Farm	CCI	1998	94
45	Colossus	Six Flags Magic Mountain	International Amusement Devices	1978	86
46	Tonnerre de Zeus	Parc Astérix	CCI	1997	85
47	HellCat	Timber Falls Adventure Park	S&S	2004	78
48	The Boss	Six Flags St. Louis	CCI	2000	70
49	Viper	Six Flags Great America		1995	69
50	Wood Coaster	Knight Valley	GCII	2011	68

=== 2013 winners ===
2013 Golden Ticket Awards
Host Park: Santa Cruz Beach Boardwalk The Amusement Today Golden Ticket Awards were announced at a ceremony held September 7, 2013.

Category	Rank	2013 Recipient	Location/Park	Vote
Best New Ride (Amusement Park)	1	Outlaw Run	Silver Dollar City	45%
Best New Ride (Amusement Park)	2	Iron Rattler	Six Flags Fiesta Texas	19%
Best New Ride (Amusement Park)	3	GateKeeper	Cedar Point	15%
Best New Ride (Amusement Park)	4	Gold Striker	California's Great America	6%
Best New Ride (Amusement Park)	5	Transformers: The Ride	Universal Studios Florida	5%
Best New Ride (Waterpark)	1	RiverRush	Dollywood's Splash Country	53%
Best New Ride (Waterpark)	2	Bonzai Pipelines	Six Flags New England	23%
Best New Ride (Waterpark)	3	Constrictor	Wet 'n' Wild Las Vegas	7%
Best New Ride (Waterpark)	4	Bonzai Pipelines	Six Flags America	6%
Best New Ride (Waterpark)	5	Bootlegger's Run	Splish Splash	5%
Best Park	1	Cedar Point	Sandusky, Ohio	23%
Best Park	2	Europa-Park	Rust, Germany	22%
Best Park	3	Knoebels Amusement Resort	Elysburg, Pennsylvania	9%
Best Park	4	Dollywood	Pigeon Forge, Tennessee	8%
Best Park	5	Disneyland	Anaheim, California	7%
Best Park	6	Tokyo DisneySea	Tokyo, Japan	6%
Best Park	7	Busch Gardens Williamsburg	Williamsburg, Virginia	5%
Best Park	7	Universal's Islands of Adventure	Orlando, Florida	5%
Best Park	9	Magic Kingdom	Orlando, Florida	4.5%
Best Park	10	Silver Dollar City	Branson, Missouri	4%
Best Waterpark	1	Schlitterbahn	New Braunfels, Texas	45%
Best Waterpark	2	Holiday World & Splashin' Safari	Santa Claus, Indiana	17%
Best Waterpark	3	Aquatica Orlando	Orlando, Florida	6%
Best Waterpark	4	Dollywood's Splash Country	Pigeon Forge, Tennessee	5%
Best Waterpark	4	Noah's Ark	Wisconsin Dells, Wisconsin	5%
Best Children's Park	1	Idlewild and Soak Zone	Ligonier, Pennsylvania	39%
Best Children's Park	2	Legoland California	Carlsbad, California	16%
Best Children's Park	3	Legoland Florida	Winter Haven, Florida	11%
Best Children's Park	4	Dutch Wonderland	Lancaster, Pennsylvania	7%
Best Children's Park	4	Story Land	Glen, New Hampshire	7%
Best Marine Life Park	1	SeaWorld Orlando	Orlando, Florida	58%
Best Marine Life Park	2	SeaWorld San Diego	San Diego, California	13%
Best Marine Life Park	3	SeaWorld San Antonio	San Antonio, Texas	9%
Best Marine Life Park	4	Discovery Cove	Orlando, Florida	7%
Best Marine Life Park	5	Ocean Park	Hong Kong, China	6%
Best Marine Life Park	5	Six Flags Discovery Kingdom	Vallejo, California	6%
Best Seaside Park	1	Santa Cruz Beach Boardwalk	Santa Cruz, California	36%
Best Seaside Park	2	Blackpool Pleasure Beach	Blackpool, England	20%
Best Seaside Park	3	Morey's Piers	Wildwood, New Jersey	15%
Best Seaside Park	4	Grona Lund	Stockholm, Sweden	14%
Best Seaside Park	5	Galveston Island Historic Pleasure Pier	Galveston, Texas	5%
Best Indoor Waterpark	1	Schlitterbahn Galveston Island	Galveston, Texas	31%
Best Indoor Waterpark	2	Kalahari Resort	Sandusky, Ohio	21%
Best Indoor Waterpark	3	Kalahari Resort	Wisconsin Dells, Wisconsin	15%
Best Indoor Waterpark	4	World Waterpark	Edmonton, Alberta, Canada	12%
Best Indoor Waterpark	5	Splash Landings	Staffordshire, England	8%
Friendliest Park	1	Dollywood	Pigeon Forge, Tennessee	35%
Friendliest Park	2	Holiday World & Splashin' Safari	Santa Claus, Indiana	21%
Friendliest Park	3	Silver Dollar City	Branson, Missouri	13%
Friendliest Park	4	Knoebel's Amusement Resort	Elysburg, Pennsylvania	10%
Friendliest Park	5	Six Flags New England	Agawam, Massachusetts	7%
Cleanest Park	1	Holiday World & Splashin' Safari	Santa Claus, Indiana	26%
Cleanest Park	2	Dollywood	Pigeon Forge, Tennessee	14%
Cleanest Park	3	Disneyland	Anaheim, California	10%
Cleanest Park	4	Busch Gardens Williamsburg	Williamsburg, Virginia	9%
Cleanest Park	5	Silver Dollar City	Branson, Missouri	8.5%
Best Shows	1	Dollywood	Pigeon Forge, Tennessee	41%
Best Shows	2	Six Flags Fiesta Texas	San Antonio, Texas	23%
Best Shows	3	Disney's Hollywood Studios	Orlando, Florida	6%
Best Shows	4	Europa-Park	Rust, Germany	5%
Best Shows	4	SeaWorld Orlando	Orlando, Florida	5%
Best Shows	4	Silver Dollar City	Branson, Missouri	5%
Best Food	1	Dollywood	Pigeon Forge, Tennessee	24%
Best Food	1	Knoebel's Amusement Resort	Elysburg, Pennsylvania	24%
Best Food	3	Epcot	Orlando, Florida	18%
Best Food	4	Silver Dollar City	Branson, Missouri	14%
Best Food	5	Tivoli Gardens	Copenhagen, Denmark	5%
Best Water Ride (Park)	1	Dudley Do-Right's Ripsaw Falls	Universal's Islands of Adventure	20%
Best Water Ride (Park)	2	Splash Mountain	Magic Kingdom	13%
Best Water Ride (Park)	3	Timber Mountain Log Ride	Knott's Berry Farm	10%
Best Water Ride (Park)	4	Valhalla	Blackpool Pleasure Beach	9%
Best Water Ride (Park)	5	Mountain Slidewinder	Dollywood	8.5%
Best Waterpark Ride	1	Wildebeest	Holiday World & Splashin' Safari	24%
Best Waterpark Ride	2	Master Blaster	Schlitterbahn	22%
Best Waterpark Ride	3	Mammoth	Holiday World & Splashin' Safari	15%
Best Waterpark Ride	4	The Falls	Schlitterbahn	10%
Best Waterpark Ride	5	Congo River Expedition	Schlitterbahn	9%
Best Kids' Area	1	Kings Island	Kings Mills, Ohio	32%
Best Kids' Area	2	Universal's Islands of Adventure	Orlando, Florida	15%
Best Kids' Area	3	Nickelodeon Universe	Bloomington, Minnesota	12%
Best Kids' Area	4	Efteling	Kaatsheuvel, The Netherlands	8%
Best Kids' Area	5	Cedar Point	Sandusky, Ohio	7%
Best Kids' Area	5	Kings Dominion	Doswell, Virginia	7%
Best Dark Ride	1	Harry Potter and the Forbidden Journey	Universal's Islands of Adventure	19%
Best Dark Ride	2	The Amazing Adventures of Spider-Man	Universal's Islands of Adventure	16%
Best Dark Ride	3	Twilight Zone Tower of Terror	Disney's Hollywood Studios	13%
Best Dark Ride	4	Haunted Mansion	Knoebel's Amusement Resort	8%
Best Dark Ride	5	Indiana Jones Adventure: Temple of the Forbidden Eye	Disneyland	7%
Best Dark Ride	5	Pirates of the Caribbean	Disneyland	7%
Best Outdoor Show Production	1	Epcot	Orlando, Florida	29%
Best Outdoor Show Production	2	Disney California Adventure	Anaheim, California	18%
Best Outdoor Show Production	3	Six Flags Fiesta Texas	San Antonio, Texas	12%
Best Outdoor Show Production	4	Disney's Hollywood Studios	Orlando, Florida	11.5%
Best Outdoor Show Production	5	Disneyland	Anaheim, California	8%
Best Landscaping	1	Busch Gardens Williamsburg	Williamsburg, Virginia	33%
Best Landscaping	2	Gilroy Gardens	Gilroy, California	12%
Best Landscaping	3	Efteling	Kaatsheuvel, The Netherlands	11%
Best Landscaping	4	Tivoli Gardens	Copenhagen, Denmark	8%
Best Landscaping	5	Dollywood	Pigeon Forge, Tennessee	7%
Best Halloween Event	1	Universal Studios Florida	Orlando, Florida	30%
Best Halloween Event	2	Knott's Berry Farm	Buena Park, California	22%
Best Halloween Event	3	Knoebel's Amusement Resort	Elysburg, Pennsylvania	11%
Best Halloween Event	4	Kennywood	West Mifflin, Pennsylvania	10%
Best Halloween Event	5	Cedar Point	Sandusky, Ohio	7%
Best Christmas Event	1	Dollywood	Pigeon Forge, Tennessee	47%
Best Christmas Event	2	Silver Dollar City	Branson, Missouri	12%
Best Christmas Event	3	Disneyland	Anaheim, California	10%
Best Christmas Event	4	Magic Kingdom	Orlando, Florida	8%
Best Christmas Event	5	Kennywood	West Mifflin, Pennsylvania	5%
Best Carousel	1	Knoebels Amusement Resort	Elysburg, Pennsylvania	48%
Best Carousel	2	Santa Cruz Beach Boardwalk	Santa Cruz, California	17%
Best Carousel	3	Six Flags Great America	Gurnee, Illinois	8%
Best Carousel	4	Six Flags Over Georgia	Austell, Georgia	7%
Best Carousel	5	Universal's Islands of Adventure	Orlando, Florida	4%
Best Indoor Coaster	1	Revenge of the Mummy: The Ride	Universal Studios Florida	23%
Best Indoor Coaster	2	Space Mountain	Disneyland	14%
Best Indoor Coaster	3	Winja's Fear & Force	Phantasialand	11%
Best Indoor Coaster	4	Mindbender	Galaxyland	10%
Best Indoor Coaster	4	Rock 'n' Roller Coaster Starring Aerosmith	Disney's Hollywood Studios	10%
Best Funhouse/Walk-Through Attraction	1	Noah's Ark	Kennywood	34%
Best Funhouse/Walk-Through Attraction	2	Frankenstein's Castle	Indiana Beach	23%
Best Funhouse/Walk-Through Attraction	3	Gasten Ghost Hotel	Liseberg	14%
Best Funhouse/Walk-Through Attraction	4	Lustiga Huset	Grona Lund	13%
Best Funhouse/Walk-Through Attraction	5	Ghost Ship	Morey's Piers	12%

Top 50 Steel Roller Coasters
Rank	2013 Recipient	Park	Supplier	Year	Points
1	Millennium Force	Cedar Point	Intamin	2000	1,204
2	Bizarro	Six Flags New England	Intamin	2000	1,011
3	Expedition GeForce	Holiday Park	Intamin	2001	598
4	Nitro	Six Flags Great Adventure	B&M	2001	596
5	Apollo's Chariot	Busch Gardens Williamsburg	B&M	1999	542
6	New Texas Giant	Six Flags Over Texas	Dinn (rebuilt RMC)	1990 (rebuilt 2011)	512
7	Goliath	Six Flags Over Georgia	B&M	2006	494
8	Intimidator	Carowinds	B&M	2010	478
9	Magnum XL-200	Cedar Point	Arrow Dynamics	1989	416
10	Intimidator 305	Kings Dominion	Intamin	2010	412
11	Iron Rattler	Six Flags Fiesta Texas	RCCA (rebuilt RMC)	1992 (rebuilt 2013)	393
12	Top Thrill Dragster	Cedar Point	Intamin	2003	356
13	Phantom's Revenge	Kennywood	Arrow Dynamics (rebuilt Morgan)	1991 (rebuilt 2001)	334
14	Diamondback	Kings Island	B&M	2009	301
15	Leviathan	Canada's Wonderland	B&M	2012	298
16	X2	Six Flags Magic Mountain	Arrow Dynamics	2002	290
17	Behemoth	Canada's Wonderland	B&M	2008	276
18	Montu	Busch Gardens Tampa Bay	B&M	1996	257
19	Mind Bender	Six Flags Over Georgia	Schwarzkopf	1978	247
20	Nemesis	Alton Towers	B&M	1994	210
21	Blue Fire	Europa-Park	Mack Rides	2009	192
22	Maverick	Cedar Point	Intamin	2007	183
23	Goliath	La Ronde	B&M	2006	156
24	Wild Eagle	Dollywood	B&M	2012	148
25	Alpengeist	Busch Gardens Williamsburg	B&M	1997	147
26	Skyrush	Hersheypark	Intamin	2012	136
27	Kumba	Busch Gardens Tampa Bay	B&M	1993	134
28	GateKeeper	Cedar Point	B&M	2013	113
29	Shock Wave	Six Flags Over Texas	Schwarzkopf	1978	103
30	Raptor	Cedar Point	B&M	1994	102
31	Raging Bull	Six Flags Great America	B&M	1999	100
32	SheiKra	Busch Gardens Tampa Bay	B&M	2005	98
33	Griffon	Busch Gardens Williamsburg	B&M	2007	97
34	Black Mamba	Phantasialand	B&M	2006	94
35	Afterburn	Carowinds	B&M	1999	92
35	Kingda Ka	Six Flags Great Adventure	Intamin	2005	92
37	Steel Force	Dorney Park & Wildwater Kingdom	Morgan	1998	87
38	Superman: Ride of Steel	Six Flags America	Intamin	2000	86
39	Volcano, The Blast Coaster	Kings Dominion	Intamin	1998	85
40	Whizzer	Six Flags Great America	Schwarzkopf	1976	80
41	Goliath	Six Flags Magic Mountain	Giovanola	2000	78
42	Expedition Everest	Disney's Animal Kingdom	Vekoma	2006	76
42	Powder Keg	Silver Dollar City	S&S Worldwide	2005	76
42	Titan	Six Flags Over Texas	Giovanola	2001	76
45	Olympia Looping	owners: R. Barth and Sohn KG	Schwarzkopf	1989	73
45	X-Flight	Six Flags Great America	B&M	2012	73
47	Dominator	Kings Dominion	B&M	2008	63
48	Kraken	SeaWorld Orlando	B&M	2000	60
48	Lisebergbanan	Liseberg	Schwarzkopf	1987	60
50	Tatsu	Six Flags Magic Mountain	B&M	2006	58

Top 50 Wooden Roller Coasters
Rank	2013 Recipient	Park	Supplier	Year	Points
1	Boulder Dash	Lake Compounce	CCI	2000	1,333
2	El Toro	Six Flags Great Adventure	Intamin	2006	1,302
3	Phoenix	Knoebels Amusement Resort	PTC	1985	1,088
4	The Voyage	Holiday World & Splashin' Safari	The Gravity Group	2006	1,086
5	Thunderhead	Dollywood	GCII	2004	923
6	Ravine Flyer II	Waldameer & Water World	The Gravity Group	2008	712
7	Outlaw Run	Silver Dollar City	RMC	2013	599
8	The Beast	Kings Island		1979	555
9	Lightning Racer	Hersheypark	GCII	2000	364
10	Shivering Timbers	Michigan's Adventure	CCI	1998	304
11	The Raven	Holiday World & Splashin' Safari	CCI	1995	296
12	Prowler	Worlds of Fun	GCII	2009	290
13	Balder	Liseberg	Intamin	2003	278
14	Hades 360	Mt. Olympus Water & Theme Park	The Gravity Group	2005	225
15	Thunderbolt	Kennywood	John Miller (rebuilt Andy Vettel)	1924 (rebuilt 1968)	222
16	The Comet	Great Escape	PTC	1994	215
17	Colossos	Heide Park	Intamin	2001	207
18	Jack Rabbit	Kennywood	Harry C. Baker	1921	192
19	Cyclone	Luna Park	Harry C. Baker	1927	166
19	The Legend	Holiday World & Splashin' Safari	CCI	2000	166
21	Kentucky Rumbler	Beech Bend Park	GCII	2006	160
22	Giant Dipper	Santa Cruz Beach Boardwalk	Arthur Looff	1924	146
23	El Toro	Freizeitpark Plohn	GCII	2009	138
24	Tremors	Silverwood Theme Park	CCI	1999	132
25	American Thunder	Six Flags St. Louis	GCII	2008	127
26	Gold Striker	California's Great America	GCII	2013	118
27	Blue Streak	Cedar Point	PTC	1964	116
28	Troy	Toverland	GCII	2007	115
29	GhostRider	Knott's Berry Farm	CCI	1998	113
30	Coaster	Playland	Carl Phare/Walker LeRoy	1958	111
31	Wodan - Timburcoaster	Europa-Park	GCII	2012	108
32	Cornball Express	Indiana Beach	CCI	2001	100
33	Blue Streak	Conneaut Lake Park	Ed Vettel	1938	99
34	Boardwalk Bullet	Kemah Boardwalk	Martin & Vleminckx	2007	94
35	Racer	Kennywood	Charles Mach	1927	90
36	Wooden Warrior	Quassy Amusement Park	The Gravity Group	2011	88
37	Zippin Pippin	Bay Beach Amusement Park	John Miller (rebuilt The Gravity Group)	1912 (rebuilt 2011)	84
38	Thunderbird	PowerLand	GCII	2006	83
39	Twister	Knoebels Amusement Resort		1999	80
40	Megafobia	Oakwood Theme Park	CCI	1996	76
41	Grand National	Blackpool Pleasure Beach	Charles Paige	1935	70
41	T Express	Everland	Intamin	2008	70
43	Great American Scream Machine	Six Flags Over Georgia	PTC	1973	66
44	Tonnerre de Zeus	Parc Astérix	CCI	1997	64
44	Viper	Six Flags Great America		1995	64
46	HellCat	Timber Falls Adventure Park	S&S	2004	62
46	Twister	Gröna Lund	The Gravity Group	2011	62
48	Cyclone	Lakeside Amusement Park	Edward Vettel	1940	60
49	Apocalypse	Six Flags Magic Mountain	GCII	2009	59
50	Yankee Cannonball	Canobie Lake Park	PTC	1930	55

=== 2012 winners ===
2012 Golden Ticket Awards
Host Park: Dollywood The Amusement Today Golden Ticket Awards were announced at a ceremony held September 8, 2012.

Category	Rank	2012 Recipient	Location	Vote
Best New Ride (Amusement Park)	1	Wild Eagle	Dollywood	30%
Best New Ride (Amusement Park)	2	Radiator Springs Racers	Disney California Adventure	15%
Best New Ride (Amusement Park)	3	Leviathan	Canada's Wonderland	14%
Best New Ride (Amusement Park)	4	Verbolten	Busch Gardens Williamsburg	7%
Best New Ride (Amusement Park)	5	OzIris	Parc Astérix	6%
Best New Ride (Amusement Park)	5	Skyrush	Hersheypark	6%
Best New Ride (Waterpark)	1	Mammoth	Holiday World & Splashin' Safari	54%
Best New Ride (Waterpark)	2	King Kaw Rapids River	Schlitterbahn Kansas City	11%
Best New Ride (Waterpark)	3	King Cobra	Six Flags Great Adventure	7%
Best New Ride (Waterpark)	4	The Lost City	Mt. Olympus Water & Theme Park	4%
Best New Ride (Waterpark)	4	Walhalla Wave	Aquatica San Antonio	4%
Best Park	1	Cedar Point	Sandusky, Ohio	21%
Best Park	2	Europa-Park	Rust, Germany	14%
Best Park	3	Dollywood	Pigeon Forge, Tennessee	13.5%
Best Park	4	Knoebels Amusement Resort	Elysburg, Pennsylvania	9%
Best Park	5	Disneyland	Anaheim, California	8%
Best Park	6	Busch Gardens Williamsburg	Williamsburg, Virginia	7%
Best Park	7	Magic Kingdom	Orlando, Florida	6%
Best Park	7	Universal's Islands of Adventure	Orlando, Florida	6%
Best Park	9	Tokyo DisneySea	Tokyo, Japan	4.5%
Best Park	10	Blackpool Pleasure Beach	Blackpool, England	4%
Best Waterpark	1	Schlitterbahn	New Braunfels, Texas	53%
Best Waterpark	2	Holiday World & Splashin' Safari	Santa Claus, Indiana	15%
Best Waterpark	3	Disney's Blizzard Beach	Orlando, Florida	7%
Best Waterpark	4	Dollywood's Splash Country	Pigeon Forge, Tennessee	6%
Best Waterpark	5	Aquatica Orlando	Orlando, Florida	5%
Best Waterpark	5	Noah's Ark	Wisconsin Dells, Wisconsin	5%
Best Children's Park	1	Idlewild and Soak Zone	Ligonier, Pennsylvania	31%
Best Children's Park	2	Legoland California	Carlsbad, California	18%
Best Children's Park	3	Farup Sommerland	Saltum, Denmark	12%
Best Children's Park	4	Legoland Florida	Winter Haven, Florida	7%
Best Children's Park	5	Sesame Place	Langhorne, Pennsylvania	6%
Best Marine Life Park	1	SeaWorld Orlando	Orlando, Florida	55%
Best Marine Life Park	2	SeaWorld San Diego	San Diego, California	11%
Best Marine Life Park	3	SeaWorld San Antonio	San Antonio, Texas	10%
Best Marine Life Park	4	Six Flags Discovery Kingdom	Vallejo, California	8%
Best Marine Life Park	5	Discovery Cove	Orlando, Florida	6%
Best Seaside Park	1	Santa Cruz Beach Boardwalk	Santa Cruz, California	34%
Best Seaside Park	2	Blackpool Pleasure Beach	Blackpool, England	20%
Best Seaside Park	3	Grona Lund	Stockholm, Sweden	19%
Best Seaside Park	4	Morey's Piers	Wildwood, New Jersey	16%
Best Seaside Park	5	Galveston Island Historic Pleasure Pier	Galveston, Texas	4%
Best Indoor Waterpark	1	Schlitterbahn Galveston Island	Galveston, Texas	33%
Best Indoor Waterpark	2	Kalahari Resort	Sandusky, Ohio	18%
Best Indoor Waterpark	3	Kalahari Resort	Wisconsin Dells, Wisconsin	17%
Best Indoor Waterpark	4	World Waterpark	Edmonton, Alberta	12%
Best Indoor Waterpark	5	Splash Landings	Staffordshire, England	8%
Friendliest Park	1	Dollywood	Pigeon Forge, Tennessee	46%
Friendliest Park	2	Holiday World & Splashin' Safari	Santa Claus, Indiana	25%
Friendliest Park	3	Silver Dollar City	Branson, Missouri	7%
Friendliest Park	4	Knoebels Amusement Resort	Elysburg, Pennsylvania	6%
Friendliest Park	5	Beech Bend Park	Bowling Green, Kentucky	4%
Friendliest Park	5	Magic Kingdom	Orlando, Florida	4%
Cleanest Park	1	Holiday World & Splashin' Safari	Santa Claus, Indiana	29%
Cleanest Park	2	Dollywood	Pigeon Forge, Tennessee	16%
Cleanest Park	3	Busch Gardens Williamsburg	Williamsburg, Virginia	14%
Cleanest Park	4	Disneyland	Anaheim, California	13%
Cleanest Park	5	Magic Kingdom	Orlando, Florida	8%
Best Shows	1	Dollywood	Pigeon Forge, Tennessee	45%
Best Shows	2	Six Flags Fiesta Texas	San Antonio, Texas	15%
Best Shows	3	Disney's Hollywood Studios	Orlando, Florida	8%
Best Shows	4	Silver Dollar City	Branson, Missouri	7%
Best Shows	5	SeaWorld Orlando	Orlando, Florida	6%
Best Food	1	Dollywood	Pigeon Forge, Tennessee	27%
Best Food	2	Knoebels Amusement Resort	Elysburg, Pennsylvania	20%
Best Food	3	Epcot	Orlando, Florida	18%
Best Food	4	Silver Dollar City	Branson, Missouri	13%
Best Food	5	Busch Gardens Williamsburg	Williamsburg, Virginia	6%
Best Water Ride (Park)	1	Dudley Do-Right's Ripsaw Falls	Universal's Islands of Adventure	26%
Best Water Ride (Park)	2	Valhalla	Blackpool Pleasure Beach	17%
Best Water Ride (Park)	3	Splash Mountain	Magic Kingdom	11%
Best Water Ride (Park)	4	Mountain Slidewinder	Dollywood	10%
Best Water Ride (Park)	5	Pilgrim's Plunge	Holiday World & Splashin' Safari	8%
Best Waterpark Ride	1	Wildebeest	Holiday World & Splashin' Safari	26%
Best Waterpark Ride	2	Master Blaster	Schlitterbahn	23%
Best Waterpark Ride	3	The Falls	Schlitterbahn	12%
Best Waterpark Ride	4	Congo River Expedition	Schlitterbahn	7%
Best Waterpark Ride	5	Zoombabwe	Holiday World & Splashin' Safari	5%
Best Kids' Area	1	Kings Island	Kings Mills, Ohio	31%
Best Kids' Area	2	Universal's Islands of Adventure	Orlando, Florida	15%
Best Kids' Area	3	Nickelodeon Universe	Bloomington, Minnesota	13%
Best Kids' Area	4	Efteling	Kaatsheuvel, The Netherlands	9%
Best Kids' Area	5	Knott's Berry Farm	Buena Park, California	6%
Best Dark Ride	1	Harry Potter and the Forbidden Journey	Universal's Islands of Adventure	24%
Best Dark Ride	2	The Amazing Adventures of Spider-Man	Universal's Islands of Adventure	18%
Best Dark Ride	3	Twilight Zone Tower of Terror	Disney's Hollywood Studios	13%
Best Dark Ride	4	Haunted Mansion	Knoebels Amusement Resort	10%
Best Dark Ride	5	Indiana Jones Adventure: Temple of the Forbidden Eye	Disneyland	6%
Best Outdoor Show Production	1	Epcot	Orlando, Florida	42%
Best Outdoor Show Production	2	Disney California Adventure	Anaheim, California	17%
Best Outdoor Show Production	3	Six Flags Fiesta Texas	San Antonio, Texas	13%
Best Outdoor Show Production	4	Magic Kingdom	Orlando, Florida	11%
Best Outdoor Show Production	5	Disney's Hollywood Studios	Orlando, Florida	10%
Best Landscaping	1	Busch Gardens Williamsburg	Williamsburg, Virginia	36%
Best Landscaping	2	Gilroy Gardens	Gilroy, California	13.5%
Best Landscaping	3	Efteling	Kaatsheuvel, The Netherlands	13%
Best Landscaping	4	Dollywood	Pigeon Forge, Tennessee	8%
Best Landscaping	5	Tivoli Gardens	Copenhagen, Denmark	7%
Best Halloween Event	1	Universal Orlando Resort	Orlando, Florida	35%
Best Halloween Event	2	Knott's Berry Farm	Buena Park, California	26%
Best Halloween Event	3	Knoebels Amusement Resort	Elysburg, Pennsylvania	13%
Best Halloween Event	4	Kennywood	West Mifflin, Pennsylvania	11%
Best Halloween Event	5	Busch Gardens Williamsburg	Williamsburg, Virginia	4%
Best Christmas Event	1	Dollywood	Pigeon Forge, Tennessee	33%
Best Christmas Event	2	Disneyland	Anaheim, California	13%
Best Christmas Event	3	Magic Kingdom	Orlando, Florida	10%
Best Christmas Event	3	Silver Dollar City	Branson, Missouri	10%
Best Christmas Event	5	Busch Gardens Williamsburg	Williamsburg, Virginia	4%
Best Carousel	1	Knoebels Amusement Resort	Elysburg, Pennsylvania	44%
Best Carousel	2	Santa Cruz Beach Boardwalk	Santa Cruz, California	18%
Best Carousel	3	Six Flags Over Georgia	Austell, Georgia	8%
Best Carousel	4	Six Flags Great America	Gurnee, Illinois	7%
Best Carousel	5	Universal's Islands of Adventure	Orlando, Florida	6%
Best Indoor Coaster	1	Revenge of the Mummy: The Ride	Universal Studios Florida	30%
Best Indoor Coaster	2	Space Mountain	Disneyland	16%
Best Indoor Coaster	3	Black Diamond	Knoebels Amusement Resort	10%
Best Indoor Coaster	4	Rock 'n' Roller Coaster Starring Aerosmith	Disney's Hollywood Studios	9%
Best Indoor Coaster	5	Space Mountain	Magic Kingdom	8.5%
Best Funhouse/Walk-Through Attraction	1	Noah's Ark	Kennywood	30%
Best Funhouse/Walk-Through Attraction	2	Frankenstein's Castle	Indiana Beach	25%
Best Funhouse/Walk-Through Attraction	3	Lustiga Huset	Grona Lund	14%
Best Funhouse/Walk-Through Attraction	4	Gasten Ghost Hotel	Liseberg	12%
Best Funhouse/Walk-Through Attraction	4	Ghost Ship	Morey's Piers	12%

Top 50 Steel Roller Coasters
Rank	2012 Recipient	Park	Supplier	Year	Points
1	Millennium Force	Cedar Point	Intamin	2000	1,272
2	Bizarro	Six Flags New England	Intamin	2000	946
3	Nitro	Six Flags Great Adventure	B&M	2001	650
4	Apollo's Chariot	Busch Gardens Williamsburg	B&M	1999	597
5	New Texas Giant	Six Flags Over Texas	Dinn (rebuilt RMC)	1990 (rebuilt 2011)	564
6	Expedition GeForce	Holiday Park	Intamin	2001	537
7	Intimidator	Carowinds	B&M	2010	520
8	Magnum XL-200	Cedar Point	Arrow Dynamics	1989	480
9	Goliath	Six Flags Over Georgia	B&M	2006	444
10	Diamondback	Kings Island	B&M	2009	395
11	Phantom's Revenge	Kennywood	Arrow Dynamics (rebuilt Morgan)	1991 (rebuilt 2001)	374
12	Intimidator 305	Kings Dominion	Intamin	2010	351
13	Top Thrill Dragster	Cedar Point	Intamin	2003	332
14	Montu	Busch Gardens Tampa Bay	B&M	1996	318
15	Wild Eagle	Dollywood	B&M	2012	292
16	Nemesis	Alton Towers	B&M	1994	238
17	Behemoth	Canada's Wonderland	B&M	2008	224
18	X²	Six Flags Magic Mountain	Arrow Dynamics	2002	209
19	Raging Bull	Six Flags Great America	B&M	1999	196
20	Mind Bender	Six Flags Over Georgia	Schwarzkopf	1978	195
21	Maverick	Cedar Point	Intamin	2007	189
22	Leviathan	Canada's Wonderland	B&M	2012	173
23	Kumba	Busch Gardens Tampa Bay	B&M	1993	141
24	Alpengeist	Busch Gardens Williamsburg	B&M	1997	133
25	Goliath	La Ronde	B&M	2006	132
26	Griffon	Busch Gardens Williamsburg	B&M	2007	124
26	Shock Wave	Six Flags Over Texas	Schwarzkopf	1978	124
28	Tatsu	Six Flags Magic Mountain	B&M	2006	116
29	Superman: Ride of Steel	Six Flags America	Intamin	2000	115
30	SheiKra	Busch Gardens Tampa Bay	B&M	2005	113
31	Raptor	Cedar Point	B&M	1994	111
32	Blue Fire	Europa-Park	Mack Rides	2009	109
33	Lisebergbanan	Liseberg	Schwarzkopf	1987	100
34	Manta	SeaWorld Orlando	B&M	2009	99
35	Dragon Challenge	Universal's Islands of Adventure	B&M	1999	98
36	Titan	Six Flags Over Texas	Giovanola	2001	94
37	Piraten	Djurs Sommerland	Intamin	2008	93
38	Kingda Ka	Six Flags Great Adventure	Intamin	2005	91
39	Steel Force	Dorney Park & Wildwater Kingdom	Morgan	1997	87
40	Volcano, The Blast Coaster	Kings Dominion	Intamin	1998	80
41	Goliath	Six Flags Magic Mountain	Giovanola	2000	78
42	Skyrush	Hersheypark	Intamin	2012	77
43	Ride of Steel	Darien Lake	Intamin	1999	74
44	Storm Runner	Hersheypark	Intamin	2004	66
45	Afterburn	Carowinds	B&M	1999	59
46	Powder Keg	Silver Dollar City	S&S	2005	58
47	The Incredible Hulk Coaster	Universal's Islands of Adventure	B&M	1999	56
48	Goliath	Walibi Holland	Intamin	2002	55
49	Black Mamba	Phantasialand	B&M	2006	50
50	Euro-Mir	Europa-Park	Mack Rides	1997	49

Top 50 Wooden Roller Coasters
Rank	2012 Recipient	Park	Supplier	Year	Points
1	El Toro	Six Flags Great Adventure	Intamin	2006	1,279
2	The Voyage	Holiday World & Splashin' Safari	The Gravity Group	2006	1,190
3	Phoenix	Knoebels Amusement Resort	PTC	1985	1,091
4	Thunderhead	Dollywood	GCII	2004	1,018
5	Boulder Dash	Lake Compounce	CCI	2000	1,009
6	Ravine Flyer II	Waldameer & Water World	The Gravity Group	2008	762
7	The Beast	Kings Island		1979	677
8	The Raven	Holiday World & Splashin' Safari	CCI	1995	385
9	Shivering Timbers	Michigan's Adventure	CCI	1998	378
10	Balder	Liseberg	Intamin	2003	364
11	Lightning Racer	Hersheypark	GCII	2000	351
12	Hades	Mt. Olympus Theme Park	Gravity Group	2005	344
13	Prowler	Worlds of Fun	GCII	2009	284
14	Cyclone	Luna Park	Harry C. Baker	1927	259
15	Thunderbolt	Kennywood	John Miller (rebuilt Andy Vettel)	1924 (rebuilt 1968)	228
16	Jack Rabbit	Kennywood	Harry C. Baker	1921	197
17	Giant Dipper	Santa Cruz Beach Boardwalk	Arthur Looff	1924	179
18	The Legend	Holiday World & Splashin' Safari	CCI	2000	171
19	Colossos	Heide Park	Intamin	2001	169
20	The Comet	Great Escape	PTC	1994	161
21	Tremors	Silverwood Theme Park	CCI	1999	149
22	Kentucky Rumbler	Beech Bend Park	GCII	2006	147
23	GhostRider	Knott's Berry Farm	CCI	1998	142
24	Twister	Gröna Lund	The Gravity Group	2011	120
25	Troy	Toverland	GCII	2007	117
26	Viper	Six Flags Great America		1995	116
27	Megafobia	Oakwood Theme Park	CCI	1996	115
28	Apocalypse	Six Flags Magic Mountain	GCII	2009	111
29	Coaster	Playland	Carl Phare/Walker LeRoy	1958	107
30	Grand National	Blackpool Pleasure Beach	Charles Paige	1935	106
31	American Thunder	Six Flags St. Louis	GCII	2008	104
32	Wooden Warrior	Quassy Amusement Park	The Gravity Group	2011	100
33	Twister	Knoebels Amusement Resort		1999	99
34	El Toro	Freizeitpark Plohn	GCII	2009	97
35	Thunderbird	PowerPark	GCII	2006	93
36	HellCat	Timber Falls Adventure Park	S&S	2004	90
37	Tonnerre de Zeus	Parc Astérix	CCI	1997	87
38	Blue Streak	Cedar Point	PTC	1964	85
39	Boardwalk Bullet	Kemah Boardwalk	Martin & Vleminckx	2007	80
39	Cornball Express	Indiana Beach	CCI	2001	80
41	Rutschebanen	Tivoli Gardens	Valdemar Lebech	1915	79
42	The Boss	Six Flags St. Louis	CCI	2000	73
42	Racer	Kennywood	Charles Mach	1927	73
44	Blue Streak	Conneaut Lake Park	Ed Vettel	1938	65
45	Mean Streak	Cedar Point	Dinn	1991	57
46	T Express	Everland	Intamin	2008	55
46	Timber Terror	Silverwood Theme Park	CCI	1996	55
48	Great American Scream Machine	Six Flags Over Georgia	PTC	1973	52
49	Wild Mouse	Blackpool Pleasure Beach		1958	50
50	Renegade	Valleyfair	GCII	2007	49

=== 2011 winners ===
2011 Golden Ticket Awards
Host Park: Holiday World & Splashin' Safari

Category	Rank	2011 Recipient	Location	Vote
Best New Ride (Amusement Park)	1	New Texas Giant	Six Flags Over Texas	45%
Best New Ride (Amusement Park)	2	Cheetah Hunt	Busch Gardens Tampa Bay	12%
Best New Ride (Amusement Park)	3	Wooden Warrior	Quassy Amusement Park	11%
Best New Ride (Amusement Park)	4	Twister	Gröna Lund	5%
Best New Ride (Amusement Park)	4	Zippin Pippin	Bay Beach Amusement Park	5%
Best New Ride (Waterpark)	1	The Falls	Schlitterbahn	45%
Best New Ride (Waterpark)	2	Vanish Point	Water Country USA	15%
Best New Ride (Waterpark)	3	Bombs Away	Raging Waters	8%
Best New Ride (Waterpark)	3	Viper	NRH2O	8%
Best Park	1	Cedar Point	Sandusky, Ohio	23%
Best Park	2	Knoebels Amusement Resort	Elysburg, Pennsylvania	13%
Best Park	3	Europa-Park	Rust, Germany	12%
Best Park	4	Dollywood	Pigeon Forge, Tennessee	8%
Best Park	5	Disneyland	Anaheim, California	7%
Best Park	6	Universal's Islands of Adventure	Orlando, Florida	6.5%
Best Park	7	Busch Gardens Williamsburg	Williamsburg, Virginia	5.5%
Best Park	8	Tokyo DisneySea	Tokyo, Japan	5%
Best Park	8	Kennywood	West Mifflin, Pennsylvania	5%
Best Park	9	Holiday World & Splashin' Safari	Santa Claus, Indiana	4.5%
Best Park	9	Blackpool Pleasure Beach	Blackpool, England	4.5%
Best Waterpark	1	Schlitterbahn	New Braunfels, Texas	66%
Best Waterpark	2	Holiday World & Splashin' Safari	Santa Claus, Indiana	14%
Best Waterpark	3	Disney's Blizzard Beach	Orlando, Florida	6%
Best Waterpark	4	Disney's Typhoon Lagoon	Orlando, Florida	5%
Best Waterpark	5	Noah's Ark	Wisconsin Dells, Wisconsin	4%
Best Children's Park	1	Idlewild and Soak Zone	Ligonier, Pennsylvania	30%
Best Children's Park	2	Legoland California	Carlsbad, California	25%
Best Children's Park	3	Fårup Sommerland	Saltum, Denmark	11%
Best Children's Park	4	Legoland Windsor	Windsor, England	10%
Best Children's Park	5	Dutch Wonderland	Lancaster, Pennsylvania	6%
Best Marine Life Park	1	SeaWorld Orlando	Orlando, Florida	55%
Best Marine Life Park	2	SeaWorld San Antonio	San Antonio, Texas	14%
Best Marine Life Park	3	Discovery Cove	Orlando, Florida	11%
Best Marine Life Park	4	SeaWorld San Diego	San Diego	10%
Best Marine Life Park	5	Six Flags Discovery Kingdom	Vallejo, California	6%
Best Seaside Park	1	Santa Cruz Beach Boardwalk	Santa Cruz, California	29%
Best Seaside Park	2	Blackpool Pleasure Beach	Blackpool, England	28%
Best Seaside Park	3	Morey's Piers	Wildwood, New Jersey	16%
Best Seaside Park	4	Gröna Lund	Stockholm, Sweden	5%
Best Seaside Park	5	Kemah Boardwalk	Kemah, Texas	4%
Best Indoor Waterpark	1	Schlitterbahn Galveston Island	Galveston, Texas	31%
Best Indoor Waterpark	2	Kalahari Resort	Sandusky, Ohio	16%
Best Indoor Waterpark	3	Kalahari Resort	Wisconsin Dells, Wisconsin	15%
Best Indoor Waterpark	4	World Waterpark	Edmonton, Canada	12%
Best Indoor Waterpark	5	Splash Landings	Staffordshire, England	11%
Friendliest Park	1	Holiday World & Splashin' Safari	Santa Claus, Indiana	32%
Friendliest Park	2	Dollywood	Pigeon Forge, Tennessee	25%
Friendliest Park	3	Knoebels Amusement Resort	Elysburg, Pennsylvania	13%
Friendliest Park	4	Silver Dollar City	Branson, Missouri	12%
Friendliest Park	5	Beech Bend Park	Bowling Green, Kentucky	5%
Cleanest Park	1	Holiday World & Splashin' Safari	Santa Claus, Indiana	35%
Cleanest Park	2	Busch Gardens Williamsburg	Williamsburg, Virginia	15%
Cleanest Park	3	Dollywood	Pigeon Forge, Tennessee	10%
Cleanest Park	4	Magic Kingdom	Orlando, Florida	9%
Cleanest Park	5	Disneyland	Anaheim, California	8%
Best Shows	1	Dollywood	Pigeon Forge, Tennessee	30%
Best Shows	2	Six Flags Fiesta Texas	San Antonio, Texas	28%
Best Shows	3	Silver Dollar City	Branson, Missouri	10%
Best Shows	4	SeaWorld Orlando	Orlando, Florida	8%
Best Shows	5	Disney's Hollywood Studios	Orlando, Florida	7%
Best Food	1	Knoebels Amusement Resort	Elysburg, Pennsylvania	29%
Best Food	2	Epcot	Orlando, Florida	17%
Best Food	3	Dollywood	Pigeon Forge, Tennessee	15%
Best Food	4	Silver Dollar City	Branson, Missouri	13%
Best Food	5	Busch Gardens Williamsburg	Williamsburg, Virginia	7%
Best Water Ride (Park)	1	Dudley Do-Right's Ripsaw Falls	Universal's Islands of Adventure	26%
Best Water Ride (Park)	2	Valhalla	Blackpool Pleasure Beach	19%
Best Water Ride (Park)	3	Pilgrim's Plunge	Holiday World & Splashin' Safari	10%
Best Water Ride (Park)	4	Splash Mountain	Magic Kingdom	9%
Best Water Ride (Park)	5	Journey to Atlantis	SeaWorld Orlando	7%
Best Waterpark Ride	1	Wildebeest	Holiday World & Splashin' Safari	34%
Best Waterpark Ride	2	Master Blaster	Schlitterbahn	24%
Best Waterpark Ride	3	Dragon's Revenge	Schlitterbahn	13%
Best Waterpark Ride	4	Congo River Expedition	Schlitterbahn	8%
Best Waterpark Ride	5	ZOOMbabwe	Holiday World & Splashin' Safari	5%
Best Kids' Area	1	Kings Island	Mason, Ohio	30%
Best Kids' Area	2	Universal's Islands of Adventure	Orlando, Florida	16%
Best Kids' Area	3	Nickelodeon Universe	Bloomington, Minnesota	12%
Best Kids' Area	4	Drayton Manor Theme Park	Staffordshire, England	8%
Best Kids' Area	5	Efteling	Kaatsheuvel, Netherlands	7%
Best Dark Ride	1	Harry Potter and the Forbidden Journey	Universal's Islands of Adventure	26%
Best Dark Ride	2	The Amazing Adventures of Spider-Man	Universal's Islands of Adventure	23%
Best Dark Ride	3	Twilight Zone Tower of Terror	Disney's Hollywood Studios	15%
Best Dark Ride	4	Haunted Mansion	Knoebels Amusement Resort	10%
Best Dark Ride	5	Indiana Jones Adventure: Temple of the Forbidden Eye	Disneyland	6%
Best Outdoor Show Production	1	Epcot	Orlando, Florida	34%
Best Outdoor Show Production	2	Six Flags Fiesta Texas	San Antonio, Texas	17%
Best Outdoor Show Production	3	Disney California Adventure	Anaheim, California	16%
Best Outdoor Show Production	4	Disneyland	Anaheim, California	10%
Best Outdoor Show Production	4	Magic Kingdom	Orlando, Florida	10%
Best Landscaping	1	Busch Gardens Williamsburg	Williamsburg, Virginia	33%
Best Landscaping	2	Efteling	Kaatsheuvel, Netherlands	13%
Best Landscaping	3	Gilroy Gardens	Gilroy, California	12%
Best Landscaping	4	Dollywood	Pigeon Forge, Tennessee	9%
Best Landscaping	5	Epcot	Orlando, Florida	7%
Best Halloween Event	1	Universal Orlando Resort	Orlando, Florida	32%
Best Halloween Event	2	Knott's Berry Farm	Buena Park, California	26%
Best Halloween Event	3	Knoebels Amusement Resort	Elysburg, Pennsylvania	16%
Best Halloween Event	4	Kennywood	West Mifflin, Pennsylvania	10%
Best Halloween Event	5	Europa-Park	Rust, Germany	5%
Best Christmas Event	1	Dollywood	Pigeon Forge, Tennessee	38%
Best Christmas Event	2	Silver Dollar City	Branson, Missouri	14%
Best Christmas Event	3	Magic Kingdom	Orlando, Florida	13.5%
Best Christmas Event	4	Disneyland	Anaheim, California	10%
Best Christmas Event	5	Disney's Hollywood Studios	Orlando, Florida	7%
Best Carousel	1	Knoebels Amusement Resort	Elysburg, Pennsylvania	55%
Best Carousel	2	Santa Cruz Beach Boardwalk	Santa Cruz, California	18%
Best Carousel	3	Six Flags Over Georgia	Austell, Georgia	7%
Best Carousel	4	Kennywood	West Mifflin, Pennsylvania	5%
Best Carousel	5	Six Flags Great America	Gurnee, Illinois	4%
Best Indoor Coaster	1	Revenge of the Mummy: The Ride	Universal Studios Florida	31%
Best Indoor Coaster	2	Space Mountain	Disneyland	15%
Best Indoor Coaster	3	Rock 'n' Roller Coaster Starring Aerosmith	Disney's Hollywood Studios	13%
Best Indoor Coaster	4	Mindbender	Galaxyland	12%
Best Indoor Coaster	5	Space Mountain	Magic Kingdom	9%
Best Funhouse/Walk-Through Attraction	1	Noah's Ark	Kennywood	24%
Best Funhouse/Walk-Through Attraction	2	Frankenstein's Castle	Indiana Beach	23%
Best Funhouse/Walk-Through Attraction	3	Noah's Ark	Blackpool Pleasure Beach	15%
Best Funhouse/Walk-Through Attraction	4	Ghost Ship	Morey's Piers	13%
Best Funhouse/Walk-Through Attraction	5	Lustiga Huset	Gröna Lund	12%

Top 50 Steel Roller Coasters
Rank	2011 Recipient	Park	Supplier	Year	Points
1	Millennium Force	Cedar Point	Intamin	2000	1,540
2	Bizarro	Six Flags New England	Intamin	2000	1,201
3	Nitro	Six Flags Great Adventure	B&M	2001	864
4	Goliath	Six Flags Over Georgia	B&M	2006	794
5	Phantom's Revenge	Kennywood	Arrow Dynamics (rebuilt Morgan)	1991 (rebuilt 2001)	756
6	New Texas Giant	Six Flags Over Texas	Dinn (rebuilt RMC)	1990 (rebuilt 2011)	743
7	Apollo's Chariot	Busch Gardens Williamsburg	B&M	1999	643
7	Expedition GeForce	Holiday Park	Intamin	2001	643
9	Top Thrill Dragster	Cedar Point	Intamin	2003	627
10	Magnum XL-200	Cedar Point	Arrow Dynamics	1989	510
11	Diamondback	Kings Island	B&M	2009	493
12	Nemesis	Alton Towers	B&M	1994	470
13	Intimidator 305	Kings Dominion	Intamin	2010	381
14	Montu	Busch Gardens Tampa Bay	B&M	1996	331
15	Behemoth	Canada's Wonderland	B&M	2008	278
16	X²	Six Flags Magic Mountain	Arrow Dynamics	2002	276
17	Mind Bender	Six Flags Over Georgia	Schwarzkopf	1978	217
18	Raptor	Cedar Point	B&M	1994	212
19	Intimidator	Carowinds	B&M	2010	207
20	Griffon	Busch Gardens Williamsburg	B&M	2007	190
21	Maverick	Cedar Point	Intamin	2007	187
22	SheiKra	Busch Gardens Tampa Bay	B&M	2005	186
23	Goliath	La Ronde	B&M	2006	182
24	Raging Bull	Six Flags Great America	B&M	1999	180
25	Titan	Six Flags Over Texas	Giovanola	2001	178
26	Steel Force	Dorney Park & Wildwater Kingdom	Morgan	1997	177
27	Alpengeist	Busch Gardens Williamsburg	B&M	1997	156
28	Dragon Challenge	Universal's Islands of Adventure	B&M	1999	149
29	Ride of Steel	Darien Lake	Intamin	1999	148
29	Volcano, The Blast Coaster	Kings Dominion	Intamin	1998	148
31	Kumba	Busch Gardens Tampa Bay	B&M	1993	144
32	Piraten	Djurs Sommerland	Intamin	2008	130
33	Kingda Ka	Six Flags Great Adventure	Intamin	2005	129
34	Blue Fire	Europa-Park	Mack Rides	2009	123
35	The Incredible Hulk Coaster	Universal's Islands of Adventure	B&M	1999	116
36	Goliath	Walibi Holland	Intamin	2002	108
37	Powder Keg	Silver Dollar City	S&S	2005	102
38	Superman: Krypton Coaster	Six Flags Fiesta Texas	B&M	2000	99
39	Tatsu	Six Flags Magic Mountain	B&M	2006	98
40	Goliath	Six Flags Magic Mountain	Giovanola	2000	97
40	Superman: Ride of Steel	Six Flags America	Intamin	2000	97
42	Shock Wave	Six Flags Over Texas	Schwarzkopf	1978	93
43	Space Mountain	Disneyland	Dynamic Structures	1977	87
44	Sky Rocket	Kennywood	Premier Rides	2010	85
45	Manta	SeaWorld Orlando	B&M	2009	84
45	Olympia Looping	R. Barth and Sohn	Schwarzkopf	1989	84
47	Expedition Everest	Disney's Animal Kingdom	Vekoma	2006	80
48	The Big One	Blackpool Pleasure Beach	Arrow Dynamics	1994	79
49	Lisebergbanan	Liseberg	Zierer	1987	75
50	Mamba	Worlds of Fun	Morgan	1998	73

Top 50 Wooden Roller Coasters
Rank	2011 Recipient	Park	Supplier	Year	Points
1	The Voyage	Holiday World & Splashin' Safari	The Gravity Group	2006	1,631
2	Phoenix	Knoebels Amusement Resort	PTC	1985	1,375
3	El Toro	Six Flags Great Adventure	Intamin	2006	1,359
4	Boulder Dash	Lake Compounce	CCI	2000	1,267
5	Thunderhead	Dollywood	GCII	2004	1,065
6	Ravine Flyer II	Waldameer & Water World	The Gravity Group	2008	969
7	The Beast	Kings Island		1979	591
8	Hades	Mount Olympus Water & Theme Park	The Gravity Group	2005	494
9	Shivering Timbers	Michigan's Adventure	CCI	1998	484
10	Prowler	Worlds of Fun	GCII	2009	452
11	Lightning Racer	Hersheypark	GCII	2000	444
12	The Raven	Holiday World & Splashin' Safari	CCI	1995	405
13	Balder	Liseberg	Intamin	2003	377
14	Thunderbolt	Kennywood	John Miller (rebuilt Andy Vettel)	1924 (rebuilt 1968)	267
15	Cyclone	Luna Park	Harry C. Baker	1927	264
16	Kentucky Rumbler	Beech Bend Park	GCII	2006	263
17	Boardwalk Bullet	Kemah Boardwalk	Martin & Vleminckx	2007	241
18	The Legend	Holiday World & Splashin' Safari	CCI	2000	240
19	The Comet	Great Escape	PTC	1994	215
20	Megafobia	Oakwood Theme Park	CCI	1996	212
20	Twister	Knoebels Amusement Resort		1999	212
22	American Thunder	Six Flags St. Louis	GCII	2008	196
23	Jack Rabbit	Kennywood	Harry C. Baker	1921	195
24	Cornball Express	Indiana Beach	CCI	2004	179
25	Grand National	Blackpool Pleasure Beach	Charles Paige	1935	173
26	Renegade	Valleyfair	GCII	2007	161
27	GhostRider	Knott's Berry Farm	CCI	1998	151
28	Giant Dipper	Santa Cruz Beach Boardwalk	Arthur Looff	1924	147
29	Colossos	Heide Park	Intamin	2001	139
30	HellCat	Timber Falls Adventure Park	S&S	2004	138
31	Tremors	Silverwood Theme Park	CCI	1999	134
32	Rampage	Alabama Adventure	CCI	1998	127
33	Troy	Toverland	GCII	2007	123
34	Coaster	Playland	Carl Phare/Walker LeRoy	1958	118
35	El Toro	Freizeitpark Plohn	GCII	2009	111
36	Apocalypse	Six Flags Magic Mountain	GCII	2009	110
36	Twister	Gröna Lund	The Gravity Group	2011	110
38	Thunderbird	PowerPark	GCII	2006	102
39	T Express	Everland	Intamin	2008	101
40	Wooden Warrior	Quassy Amusement Park	The Gravity Group	2011	99
41	Viper	Six Flags Great America		1995	95
42	The Boss	Six Flags St. Louis	CCI	2000	93
43	Racer	Kennywood	Charles Mach	1927	86
44	Wild Mouse	Blackpool Pleasure Beach		1958	74
44	Zippin Pippin	Bay Beach Amusement Park	John Miller (rebuilt The Gravity Group)	1912 (rebuilt 2011)	74
46	Blue Streak	Conneaut Lake Park	Ed Vettel	1938	68
47	The Rattler	Six Flags Fiesta Texas	RCCA	1992	65
48	Rutschebanen	Tivoli Gardens	Valdemar Lebech	1915	62
49	Blue Streak	Cedar Point	PTC	1964	60
50	Tonnerre de Zeus	Parc Astérix	CCI	1997	52

=== 2010 winners ===
2010 Golden Ticket Awards
Host Park: Busch Gardens Williamsburg il Teatro di San Marco (outdoor theater)

Category	Rank	2010 Recipient	Location	Vote
Best New Ride (Amusement Park)	1	Harry Potter and the Forbidden Journey	Universal's Islands of Adventure	24%
Best New Ride (Amusement Park)	2	Intimidator 305	Kings Dominion	21%
Best New Ride (Amusement Park)	3	Sky Rocket	Kennywood	20%
Best New Ride (Amusement Park)	4	Intimidator	Carowinds	14%
Best New Ride (Amusement Park)	5	Ghost Ship	Morey's Piers	4%
Best New Ride (Amusement Park)	5	Joris en de Draak	Efteling	4%
Best New Ride (Waterpark)	1	Wildebeest	Holiday World & Splashin' Safari	69%
Best New Ride (Waterpark)	2	Scorpion's Tail	Noah's Ark	12%
Best New Ride (Waterpark)	3	Triple Twist	Great Wolf Lodge Kings Mills	6%
Best New Ride (Waterpark)	4	Omaka Rocka	Aquatica	5.5%
Best Park	1	Cedar Point	Sandusky, Ohio	26%
Best Park	2	Knoebels Amusement Resort	Elysburg, Pennsylvania	11%
Best Park	3	Islands of Adventure	Orlando, Florida	10%
Best Park	4	Disneyland	Anaheim, California	9%
Best Park	5	Busch Gardens Williamsburg	Williamsburg, Virginia	7%
Best Park	5	Europa-Park	Rust, Germany	7%
Best Park	7	Kennywood	West Mifflin, Pennsylvania	6%
Best Park	7	Blackpool Pleasure Beach	Blackpool, England	6%
Best Park	9	Dollywood	Pigeon Forge, Tennessee	4.5%
Best Park	9	Holiday World & Splashin' Safari	Santa Claus, Indiana	4.5%
Best Park	9	Tokyo DisneySea	Tokyo, Japan	4.5%
Best Waterpark	1	Schlitterbahn	New Braunfels, Texas	57%
Best Waterpark	2	Holiday World & Splashin' Safari	Santa Claus, Indiana	16%
Best Waterpark	3	Disney's Blizzard Beach	Orlando, Florida	8%
Best Waterpark	4	Noah's Ark	Wisconsin Dells, Wisconsin	6%
Best Waterpark	5	Disney's Typhoon Lagoon	Orlando, Florida	5.5%
Best Children's Park	1	Idlewild and Soak Zone	Ligonier, Pennsylvania	38%
Best Children's Park	2	Legoland California	Carlsbad, California	30%
Best Children's Park	3	Fårup Sommerland	Saltum, Denmark	8%
Best Children's Park	4	Dutch Wonderland	Lancaster, Pennsylvania	6%
Best Children's Park	5	Little Amerricka	Marshall, Wisconsin	4%
Best Marine Life Park	1	SeaWorld Orlando	Orlando, Florida	60%
Best Marine Life Park	2	SeaWorld San Antonio	San Antonio, Texas	13%
Best Marine Life Park	3	SeaWorld San Diego	San Diego	10%
Best Marine Life Park	4	Discovery Cove	Orlando, Florida	6%
Best Marine Life Park	5	Six Flags Discovery Kingdom	Vallejo, California	5%
Best Seaside Park	1	Santa Cruz Beach Boardwalk	Santa Cruz, California	37%
Best Seaside Park	2	Blackpool Pleasure Beach	Blackpool, England	28%
Best Seaside Park	3	Morey's Piers	Wildwood, New Jersey	22%
Best Seaside Park	4	Gröna Lund	Stockholm, Sweden	5%
Best Seaside Park	5	Kemah Boardwalk	Kemah, Texas	4%
Best Indoor Waterpark	1	Schlitterbahn Galveston Island	Galveston, Texas	33%
Best Indoor Waterpark	2	Kalahari Resort	Wisconsin Dells, Wisconsin	17%
Best Indoor Waterpark	3	Kalahari Resort	Sandusky, Ohio	16%
Best Indoor Waterpark	4	World Waterpark	Edmonton, Canada	12%
Best Indoor Waterpark	5	Splash Landings	Staffordshire, England	9%
Friendliest Park	1	Holiday World & Splashin' Safari	Santa Claus, Indiana	34%
Friendliest Park	2	Dollywood	Pigeon Forge, Tennessee	24%
Friendliest Park	3	Silver Dollar City	Branson, Missouri	20%
Friendliest Park	4	Knoebels Amusement Resort	Elysburg, Pennsylvania	9%
Friendliest Park	5	Beech Bend Park	Bowling Green, Kentucky	4%
Cleanest Park	1	Holiday World & Splashin' Safari	Santa Claus, Indiana	37%
Cleanest Park	2	Busch Gardens Williamsburg	Williamsburg, Virginia	15%
Cleanest Park	3	Dollywood	Pigeon Forge, Tennessee	11%
Cleanest Park	4	Magic Kingdom	Orlando, Florida	10%
Cleanest Park	5	Disneyland	Anaheim, California	9%
Best Shows	1	Dollywood	Pigeon Forge, Tennessee	35%
Best Shows	2	Six Flags Fiesta Texas	San Antonio, Texas	18%
Best Shows	3	Silver Dollar City	Branson, Missouri	10%
Best Shows	4	Disney's Hollywood Studios	Orlando, Florida	8%
Best Shows	5	SeaWorld Orlando	Orlando, Florida	7.5%
Best Food	1	Knoebels Amusement Resort	Elysburg, Pennsylvania	27%
Best Food	2	Epcot	Orlando, Florida	18%
Best Food	2	Silver Dollar City	Branson, Missouri	18%
Best Food	4	Dollywood	Pigeon Forge, Tennessee	12%
Best Food	5	Busch Gardens Williamsburg	Williamsburg, Virginia	8%
Best Water Ride (Park)	1	Dudley Do-Right's Ripsaw Falls	Universal's Islands of Adventure	24%
Best Water Ride (Park)	2	Valhalla	Blackpool Pleasure Beach	17%
Best Water Ride (Park)	3	Splash Mountain	Magic Kingdom	13%
Best Water Ride (Park)	4	Pilgrim's Plunge	Holiday World & Splashin' Safari	11%
Best Water Ride (Park)	5	Journey to Atlantis	SeaWorld Orlando	9%
Best Waterpark Ride	1	Wildebeest	Holiday World & Splashin' Safari	33%
Best Waterpark Ride	2	Master Blaster	Schlitterbahn	21%
Best Waterpark Ride	3	ZOOMbabwe	Holiday World & Splashin' Safari	9%
Best Waterpark Ride	4	Dragon's Revenge	Schlitterbahn	8%
Best Waterpark Ride	5	Congo River Expedition	Schlitterbahn	7%
Best Kids' Area	1	Kings Island	Mason, Ohio	33%
Best Kids' Area	2	Universal's Islands of Adventure	Orlando, Florida	13%
Best Kids' Area	3	Nickelodeon Universe	Bloomington, Minnesota	12%
Best Kids' Area	4	Knott's Berry Farm	Buena Park, California	7%
Best Kids' Area	5	Busch Gardens Williamsburg	Williamsburg, Virginia	5%
Best Kids' Area	5	Efteling	Kaatsheuvel, Netherlands	5%
Best Dark Ride	1	The Amazing Adventures of Spider-Man	Universal's Islands of Adventure	30%
Best Dark Ride	2	Twilight Zone Tower of Terror	Disney's Hollywood Studios	19%
Best Dark Ride	3	Haunted Mansion	Knoebels Amusement Resort	14%
Best Dark Ride	4	Harry Potter and the Forbidden Journey	Universal's Islands of Adventure	10%
Best Dark Ride	5	The Curse of DarKastle	Busch Gardens Williamsburg	5%
Best Dark Ride	5	Indiana Jones Adventure: Temple of the Forbidden Eye	Disneyland	5%
Best Outdoor Show Production	1	Epcot	Orlando, Florida	40%
Best Outdoor Show Production	2	Disney California Adventure	Anaheim, California	17%
Best Outdoor Show Production	3	Six Flags Fiesta Texas	San Antonio, Texas	15%
Best Outdoor Show Production	4	Disneyland	Anaheim, California	11%
Best Outdoor Show Production	5	Disney's Hollywood Studios	Orlando, Florida	7%
Best Landscaping	1	Busch Gardens Williamsburg	Williamsburg, Virginia	33%
Best Landscaping	2	Efteling	Kaatsheuvel, Netherlands	13%
Best Landscaping	3	Gilroy Gardens	Gilroy, California	12%
Best Landscaping	4	Disney's Animal Kingdom	Orlando, Florida	9%
Best Landscaping	5	Epcot	Orlando, Florida	7%
Best Halloween Event	1	Universal Orlando Resort	Orlando, Florida	32%
Best Halloween Event	2	Knott's Berry Farm	Buena Park, California	25%
Best Halloween Event	3	Knoebels Amusement Resort	Elysburg, Pennsylvania	19%
Best Halloween Event	4	Kennywood	West Mifflin, Pennsylvania	11%
Best Halloween Event	5	Kings Island	Kings Mills, Ohio	5%
Best Christmas Event	1	Dollywood	Pigeon Forge, Tennessee	36%
Best Christmas Event	2	Magic Kingdom	Orlando, Florida	17%
Best Christmas Event	3	Silver Dollar City	Branson, Missouri	16%
Best Christmas Event	4	Disneyland	Anaheim, California	12%
Best Christmas Event	5	Hersheypark	Hershey, Pennsylvania	6%
Best Carousel	1	Knoebels Amusement Resort	Elysburg, Pennsylvania	50%
Best Carousel	2	Santa Cruz Beach Boardwalk	Santa Cruz, California	16%
Best Carousel	3	Six Flags Over Georgia	Austell, Georgia	11%
Best Carousel	4	Six Flags Great America	Gurnee, Illinois	9%
Best Carousel	5	Hersheypark	Hershey, Pennsylvania	4%
Best Indoor Coaster	1	Revenge of the Mummy: The Ride	Universal Studios Florida	30%
Best Indoor Coaster	2	Space Mountain	Disneyland	16%
Best Indoor Coaster	3	Space Mountain	Magic Kingdom	12%
Best Indoor Coaster	3	Mindbender	Galaxyland	12%
Best Indoor Coaster	5	Rock 'n' Roller Coaster Starring Aerosmith	Disney's Hollywood Studios	11%
Best Funhouse/Walk-Through Attraction	1	Noah's Ark	Kennywood	34%
Best Funhouse/Walk-Through Attraction	2	Frankenstein's Castle	Indiana Beach	32%
Best Funhouse/Walk-Through Attraction	3	Ghost Ship	Morey's Piers	10%
Best Funhouse/Walk-Through Attraction	4	Hotel Gasten	Liseberg	7%
Best Funhouse/Walk-Through Attraction	5	Lustiga Huset	Gröna Lund	6%

Top 50 Steel Roller Coasters
Rank	2010 Recipient	Park	Supplier	Year	Points
1	Millennium Force	Cedar Point	Intamin	2000	1,175
2	Bizarro	Six Flags New England	Intamin	2000	1,013
3	Nitro	Six Flags Great Adventure	B&M	2001	773
4	Apollo's Chariot	Busch Gardens Williamsburg	B&M	1999	573
5	Goliath	Six Flags Over Georgia	B&M	2006	560
6	Expedition GeForce	Holiday Park	Intamin	2001	514
7	Diamondback	Kings Island	B&M	2009	484
8	Magnum XL-200	Cedar Point	Arrow Dynamics	1989	427
9	Phantom's Revenge	Kennywood	Arrow Dynamics (rebuilt Morgan)	1991 (rebuilt 2001)	392
10	Top Thrill Dragster	Cedar Point	Intamin	2003	312
11	Intimidator 305	Kings Dominion	Intamin	2010	295
12	Montu	Busch Gardens Tampa Bay	B&M	1996	288
13	Behemoth	Canada's Wonderland	B&M	2008	236
14	Mind Bender	Six Flags Over Georgia	Schwarzkopf	1978	228
15	X²	Six Flags Magic Mountain	Arrow Dynamics	2002	213
16	Raging Bull	Six Flags Great America	B&M	1999	199
17	Sky Rocket	Kennywood	Premier Rides	2010	198
18	Nemesis	Alton Towers	B&M	1994	181
19	Griffon	Busch Gardens Williamsburg	B&M	2007	172
19	SheiKra	Busch Gardens Tampa Bay	B&M	2005	172
21	Intimidator	Carowinds	B&M	2010	152
21	Maverick	Cedar Point	Intamin	2007	152
23	Alpengeist	Busch Gardens Williamsburg	B&M	1997	145
24	Kumba	Busch Gardens Tampa Bay	B&M	1993	129
24	Raptor	Cedar Point	B&M	1994	129
26	Ride of Steel	Darien Lake	Intamin	1999	127
27	Kingda Ka	Six Flags Great Adventure	Intamin	2005	124
27	Steel Force	Dorney Park & Wildwater Kingdom	Morgan	1997	124
29	Goliath	Six Flags Magic Mountain	Giovanola	2000	122
30	Goliath	La Ronde	B&M	2006	120
31	Dragon Challenge	Universal's Islands of Adventure	B&M	1999	118
32	Superman: Ride of Steel	Six Flags America	Intamin	2000	107
33	Manta	SeaWorld Orlando	B&M	2009	103
34	Powder Keg	Silver Dollar City	S&S	2005	102
35	Volcano, The Blast Coaster	Kings Dominion	Intamin	1998	88
36	Expedition Everest	Disney's Animal Kingdom	Vekoma	2006	86
37	Shock Wave	Six Flags Over Texas	Schwarzkopf	1978	85
38	Mamba	Worlds of Fun	Morgan	1998	79
39	Storm Runner	Hersheypark	Intamin	2004	74
40	Tatsu	Six Flags Magic Mountain	B&M	2006	73
41	Goliath	Walibi Holland	Intamin	2002	71
42	Titan	Six Flags Over Texas	Giovanola	2001	62
43	The Incredible Hulk Coaster	Universal's Islands of Adventure	B&M	1999	57
44	Big One	Blackpool Pleasure Beach	Arrow Dynamics	1994	49
45	Euro-Mir	Europa-Park	Mack Rides	1997	47
46	Space Mountain	Disneyland	Dynamic Structures	1977	46
47	Steel Eel	SeaWorld San Antonio	Morgan	1999	43
48	Mindbender	Galaxyland	Schwarzkopf	1985	42
48	Revenge of the Mummy: The Ride	Universal Studios Florida	Premier Rides	2004	42
50	Katun	Mirabilandia	B&M	2000	41

Top 50 Wooden Roller Coasters
Rank	2010 Recipient	Park	Supplier	Year	Points
1	The Voyage	Holiday World & Splashin' Safari	The Gravity Group	2006	1,154
2	El Toro	Six Flags Great Adventure	Intamin	2006	991
3	Phoenix	Knoebels Amusement Resort	PTC	1985	952
4	Boulder Dash	Lake Compounce	CCI	2000	874
5	Thunderhead	Dollywood	GCII	2004	864
6	Ravine Flyer II	Waldameer & Water World	The Gravity Group	2008	781
7	The Beast	Kings Island		1979	552
8	Hades	Mount Olympus Water & Theme Park	The Gravity Group	2005	510
9	The Raven	Holiday World & Splashin' Safari	CCI	1995	439
10	Lightning Racer	Hersheypark	GCII	2000	403
11	Shivering Timbers	Michigan's Adventure	CCI	1998	393
12	Prowler	Worlds of Fun	GCII	2009	386
13	Cyclone	Luna Park	Harry C. Baker	1927	242
14	Thunderbolt	Kennywood	John Miller (rebuilt Andy Vettel)	1924 (rebuilt 1968)	214
15	The Legend	Holiday World & Splashin' Safari	CCI	2000	211
16	Kentucky Rumbler	Beech Bend Park	GCII	2006	159
17	The Comet	Great Escape	PTC	1994	158
18	Colossos	Heide Park	Intamin	2001	157
19	HellCat	Timber Falls Adventure Park	S&S	2004	147
20	Jack Rabbit	Kennywood	Harry C. Baker	1921	146
21	Balder	Liseberg	Intamin	2003	144
22	Giant Dipper	Santa Cruz Beach Boardwalk	Arthur Looff	1924	142
23	American Thunder	Six Flags St. Louis	GCII	2008	141
24	GhostRider	Knott's Berry Farm	CCI	1998	133
25	Tremors	Silverwood Theme Park	CCI	1999	128
26	Coaster	Playland	Carl Phare/Walker LeRoy	1958	124
27	Apocalypse	Six Flags Magic Mountain	GCII	2009	122
28	Grand National	Blackpool Pleasure Beach	Charles Paige	1935	116
29	Cornball Express	Indiana Beach	CCI	2001	113
30	Megafobia	Oakwood Theme Park	CCI	1996	87
31	The Boss	Six Flags St. Louis	CCI	2000	86
32	Twister	Knoebels Amusement Resort		1999	79
33	Rampage	Alabama Adventure	CCI	1998	78
34	Viper	Six Flags Great America		1995	74
35	Racer	Kennywood	Charles Mach	1927	70
36	T Express	Everland	Intamin	2008	67
37	Thunderbird	PowerPark	GCII	2006	57
38	Boardwalk Bullet	Kemah Boardwalk	Martin & Vleminckx	2007	51
39	Hurricane	Boomers! Dania Beach	Dinn	2000	48
40	Tonnerre de Zeus	Parc Astérix	CCI	1997	46
41	Troy	Toverland	GCII	2007	43
42	Aska	Nara Dreamland	Intamin	1998	39
42	Renegade	Valleyfair	GCII	2007	39
44	Timber Terror	Silverwood Theme Park	CCI	1996	38
45	Grizzly	Kings Dominion	Taft Broadcasting Company	1982	36
46	Gwazi	Busch Gardens Tampa Bay	GCII	1999	35
47	Blue Streak	Cedar Point	PTC	1964	34
48	Georgia Cyclone	Six Flags Over Georgia	Dinn	1990	33
49	Giant Dipper	Belmont Park	Frank Prior/Frederick Church	1925	31
50	Cyclone	Lakeside Amusement Park	Edward Vettel	1940	29

=== 2009 winners ===
2009 Golden Ticket Awards
Host Park: Legoland California

Category	Rank	2009 Recipient	Location	Vote
Best New Ride (Amusement Park)	1	Prowler	Worlds of Fun	35%
Best New Ride (Amusement Park)	2	Diamondback	Kings Island	30%
Best New Ride (Amusement Park)	3	Manta	SeaWorld Orlando	12%
Best New Ride (Amusement Park)	4	Terminator Salvation: The Ride	Six Flags Magic Mountain	7%
Best New Ride (Amusement Park)	5	Monster Mansion	Six Flags Over Georgia	4%
Best New Ride (Amusement Park)	5	Pilgrims Plunge	Holiday World & Splashin' Safari	4%
Best New Ride (Waterpark)	1	Congo River Expedition	Schlitterbahn	67%
Best New Ride (Waterpark)	2	Wahoo Racer	Six Flags St. Louis	11%
Best New Ride (Waterpark)	3	UpSurge!	Alabama Adventure	10%
Best New Ride (Waterpark)	4	Maximum Velocity	Wet'n'Wild Phoenix	5%
Best New Ride (Waterpark)	5	Dr. Von Dark's Tunnel of Terror	Splish Splash	4%
Best Park	1	Cedar Point	Sandusky, Ohio	27%
Best Park	2	Knoebels Amusement Resort	Elysburg, Pennsylvania	13%
Best Park	3	Disneyland	Anaheim, California	8%
Best Park	4	Europa-Park	Rust, Germany	7%
Best Park	4	Universal's Islands of Adventure	Orlando, Florida	7%
Best Park	6	Blackpool Pleasure Beach	Blackpool, England	6.5%
Best Park	7	Tokyo DisneySea	Tokyo, Japan	6%
Best Park	8	Magic Kingdom	Orlando, Florida	5.5%
Best Park	9	Busch Gardens Williamsburg	Williamsburg, Virginia	5%
Best Park	9	Holiday World & Splashin' Safari	Santa Claus, Indiana	5%
Best Waterpark	1	Schlitterbahn	New Braunfels, Texas	60%
Best Waterpark	2	Holiday World & Splashin' Safari	Santa Claus, Indiana	14%
Best Waterpark	3	Disney's Blizzard Beach	Orlando, Florida	9%
Best Waterpark	4	Noah's Ark	Wisconsin Dells, Wisconsin	5%
Best Waterpark	5	Aquatica	Orlando, Florida	4.5%
Best Children's Park	1	Legoland California	Carlsbad, California	37%
Best Children's Park	2	Idlewild and Soak Zone	Ligonier, Pennsylvania	26%
Best Children's Park	3	Dutch Wonderland	Lancaster, Pennsylvania	11%
Best Children's Park	4	Fårup Sommerland	Saltum, Denmark	7%
Best Children's Park	5	Kiddieland Amusement Park	Melrose Park, Illinois	6%
Best Marine Life Park	1	SeaWorld Orlando	Orlando, Florida	61%
Best Marine Life Park	2	SeaWorld San Antonio	San Antonio, Texas	11%
Best Marine Life Park	3	Discovery Cove	Orlando, Florida	9%
Best Marine Life Park	3	SeaWorld San Diego	San Diego	9%
Best Marine Life Park	5	Six Flags Discovery Kingdom	Vallejo, California	5%
Best Seaside Park	1	Santa Cruz Beach Boardwalk	Santa Cruz, California	41%
Best Seaside Park	2	Blackpool Pleasure Beach	Blackpool, England	28%
Best Seaside Park	3	Morey's Piers	Wildwood, New Jersey	21%
Best Seaside Park	4	Kemah Boardwalk	Kemah, Texas	4%
Best Indoor Waterpark	1	Schlitterbahn Galveston Island	Galveston, Texas	28%
Best Indoor Waterpark	2	Kalahari Resort	Sandusky, Ohio	17%
Best Indoor Waterpark	3	Kalahari Resort	Wisconsin Dells, Wisconsin	14%
Best Indoor Waterpark	4	World Waterpark	Edmonton, Canada	13%
Best Indoor Waterpark	5	Splash Landings	Staffordshire, England	7%
Friendliest Park	1	Silver Dollar City	Branson, Missouri	30%
Friendliest Park	2	Holiday World & Splashin' Safari	Santa Claus, Indiana	28%
Friendliest Park	3	Dollywood	Pigeon Forge, Tennessee	13%
Friendliest Park	4	Knoebels Amusement Resort	Elysburg, Pennsylvania	6%
Friendliest Park	5	Beech Bend Park	Bowling Green, Kentucky	4%
Cleanest Park	1	Holiday World & Splashin' Safari	Santa Claus, Indiana	36%
Cleanest Park	2	Busch Gardens Williamsburg	Williamsburg, Virginia	14%
Cleanest Park	3	Dollywood	Pigeon Forge, Tennessee	13%
Cleanest Park	4	Disneyland	Anaheim, California	11%
Cleanest Park	5	Magic Kingdom	Orlando, Florida	7%
Best Shows	1	Dollywood	Pigeon Forge, Tennessee	25%
Best Shows	2	Six Flags Fiesta Texas	San Antonio, Texas	23%
Best Shows	3	Silver Dollar City	Branson, Missouri	15%
Best Shows	4	Disney's Hollywood Studios	Orlando, Florida	10%
Best Shows	4	SeaWorld Orlando	Orlando, Florida	10%
Best Food	1	Knoebels Amusement Resort	Elysburg, Pennsylvania	30%
Best Food	2	Silver Dollar City	Branson, Missouri	25%
Best Food	3	Epcot	Orlando, Florida	13%
Best Food	4	Dollywood	Pigeon Forge, Tennessee	11%
Best Food	5	Busch Gardens Williamsburg	Williamsburg, Virginia	7%
Best Water Ride (Park)	1	Dudley Do-Right's Ripsaw Falls	Universal's Islands of Adventure	27%
Best Water Ride (Park)	2	Valhalla	Blackpool Pleasure Beach	16%
Best Water Ride (Park)	3	Splash Mountain	Magic Kingdom	12%
Best Water Ride (Park)	4	Mountain Sidewinder	Dollywood	8%
Best Water Ride (Park)	5	Popeye and Bluto's Bilge-Rat Barges	Universal's Islands of Adventure	7%
Best Waterpark Ride	1	Master Blaster	Schlitterbahn	35%
Best Waterpark Ride	2	ZOOMbabwe	Holiday World & Splashin' Safari	15%
Best Waterpark Ride	3	Deluge	Kentucky Kingdom	9%
Best Waterpark Ride	3	Dragon's Revenge	Schlitterbahn	9%
Best Waterpark Ride	5	Summit Plummet	Disney's Blizzard Beach	8%
Best Kids' Area	1	Kings Island	Mason, Ohio	41%
Best Kids' Area	2	Universal's Islands of Adventure	Orlando, Florida	17%
Best Kids' Area	3	Nickelodeon Universe	Bloomington, Minnesota	10%
Best Kids' Area	4	Efteling	Kaatsheuvel, Netherlands	6%
Best Kids' Area	4	Knott's Berry Farm	Buena Park, California	6%
Best Dark Ride	1	The Amazing Adventures of Spider-Man	Universal's Islands of Adventure	32%
Best Dark Ride	2	Twilight Zone Tower of Terror	Disney's Hollywood Studios	16%
Best Dark Ride	3	Haunted Mansion	Knoebels Amusement Resort	12%
Best Dark Ride	4	Indiana Jones Adventure: Temple of the Forbidden Eye	Disneyland	8%
Best Dark Ride	5	Journey to the Center of the Earth	Tokyo DisneySea	5%
Best Outdoor Show Production	1	Epcot	Orlando, Florida	41%
Best Outdoor Show Production	2	Disneyland	Anaheim, California	19%
Best Outdoor Show Production	3	Six Flags Fiesta Texas	San Antonio, Texas	16%
Best Outdoor Show Production	4	Disney's Hollywood Studios	Orlando, Florida	11%
Best Outdoor Show Production	4	Magic Kingdom	Orlando, Florida	11%
Best Landscaping	1	Busch Gardens Williamsburg	Williamsburg, Virginia	35%
Best Landscaping	2	Efteling	Kaatsheuvel, Netherlands	16%
Best Landscaping	3	Gilroy Gardens	Gilroy, California	14%
Best Landscaping	4	Epcot	Orlando, Florida	6%
Best Landscaping	5	Disney's Animal Kingdom	Orlando, Florida	5%
Best Landscaping	5	Silver Dollar City	Branson, Missouri	5%
Best Halloween Event	1	Universal Orlando Resort	Orlando, Florida	34%
Best Halloween Event	2	Knott's Berry Farm	Buena Park, California	25%
Best Halloween Event	3	Knoebels Amusement Resort	Elysburg, Pennsylvania	17%
Best Halloween Event	4	Kennywood	West Mifflin, Pennsylvania	12%
Best Christmas Event	1	Dollywood	Pigeon Forge, Tennessee	35%
Best Christmas Event	2	Silver Dollar City	Branson, Missouri	19%
Best Christmas Event	3	Magic Kingdom	Orlando, Florida	13%
Best Christmas Event	4	Disneyland	Anaheim, California	12%
Best Christmas Event	5	Hersheypark	Hershey, Pennsylvania	6%
Best Carousel	1	Knoebels Amusement Resort	Elysburg, Pennsylvania	46%
Best Carousel	2	Santa Cruz Beach Boardwalk	Santa Cruz, California	19%
Best Carousel	3	Six Flags Over Georgia	Austell, Georgia	10%
Best Carousel	4	Universal's Islands of Adventure	Orlando, Florida	8%
Best Carousel	5	Six Flags Great America	Gurnee, Illinois	6%
Best Indoor Coaster	1	Revenge of the Mummy: The Ride	Universal Studios Florida	28%
Best Indoor Coaster	2	Rock 'n' Roller Coaster Starring Aerosmith	Disney's Hollywood Studios	14%
Best Indoor Coaster	3	Space Mountain	Disneyland	13%
Best Indoor Coaster	4	Mindbender	Galaxyland	12.5%
Best Indoor Coaster	5	Space Mountain	Magic Kingdom	12%
Best Funhouse/Walk-Through Attraction	1	Frankenstein's Castle	Indiana Beach	38%
Best Funhouse/Walk-Through Attraction	2	Noah's Ark	Kennywood	36%
Best Funhouse/Walk-Through Attraction	3	Hotel Gasten	Liseberg	10%
Best Funhouse/Walk-Through Attraction	4	Lustiga Huset	Gröna Lund	8%
Best Funhouse/Walk-Through Attraction	5	Spok Huset	Gröna Lund	6%

Top 50 Steel Roller Coasters
Rank	2009 Recipient	Park	Supplier	Year	Points
1	Bizarro	Six Flags New England	Intamin	2000	1,245
2	Millennium Force	Cedar Point	Intamin	2000	1,192
3	Nitro	Six Flags Great Adventure	B&M	2001	785
4	Goliath	Six Flags Over Georgia	B&M	2006	662
5	Apollo's Chariot	Busch Gardens Williamsburg	B&M	1999	584
6	Expedition GeForce	Holiday Park	Intamin	2001	541
7	Diamondback	Kings Island	B&M	2009	432
8	Phantom's Revenge	Kennywood	Arrow Dynamics (rebuilt Morgan)	1991 (rebuilt 2001)	431
9	Magnum XL-200	Cedar Point	Arrow Dynamics	1989	423
10	Top Thrill Dragster	Cedar Point	Intamin	2003	348
11	Montu	Busch Gardens Tampa Bay	B&M	1996	282
12	Behemoth	Canada's Wonderland	B&M	2008	280
13	X²	Six Flags Magic Mountain	Arrow Dynamics	2002	263
14	Raging Bull	Six Flags Great America	B&M	1999	251
15	Maverick	Cedar Point	Intamin	2007	230
16	Mind Bender	Six Flags Over Georgia	Schwarzkopf	1978	227
17	Dueling Dragons	Universal's Islands of Adventure	B&M	1999	219
18	SheiKra	Busch Gardens Tampa Bay	B&M	2005	182
19	Alpengeist	Busch Gardens Williamsburg	B&M	1997	181
20	Nemesis	Alton Towers	B&M	1994	180
21	Powder Keg	Silver Dollar City	S&S	2005	171
22	Raptor	Cedar Point	B&M	1994	169
23	Steel Force	Dorney Park & Wildwater Kingdom	Morgan	1997	161
24	Big Bad Wolf	Busch Gardens Williamsburg	Arrow Dynamics	1984	160
25	Goliath	La Ronde	B&M	2006	148
26	Griffon	Busch Gardens Williamsburg	B&M	2007	144
27	Kumba	Busch Gardens Tampa Bay	B&M	1993	139
28	Ride of Steel	Darien Lake	Intamin	1999	119
29	The Incredible Hulk Coaster	Universal's Islands of Adventure	B&M	1999	118
30	Mamba	Worlds of Fun	Morgan	1998	115
31	Kingda Ka	Six Flags Great Adventure	Intamin	2005	111
32	Tatsu	Six Flags Magic Mountain	B&M	2006	109
33	Goliath	Six Flags Magic Mountain	Giovanola	2000	107
34	Shock Wave	Six Flags Over Texas	Schwarzkopf	1978	105
35	Superman: Ride of Steel	Six Flags America	Intamin	2000	103
36	Expedition Everest	Disney's Animal Kingdom	Vekoma	2006	99
37	Titan	Six Flags Over Texas	Giovanola	2001	97
38	Manta	SeaWorld Orlando	B&M	2009	85
38	Storm Runner	Hersheypark	Intamin	2004	85
40	Goliath	Walibi Holland	Intamin	2002	81
41	Volcano, The Blast Coaster	Kings Dominion	Intamin	1998	80
42	Xcelerator	Knott's Berry Farm	Intamin	2002	75
43	Euro-Mir	Europa-Park	Mack Rides	1998	58
44	Superman: Krypton Coaster	Six Flags Fiesta Texas	B&M	2000	53
45	Big One	Blackpool Pleasure Beach	Arrow Dynamics	1994	52
46	Steel Eel	SeaWorld San Antonio	Morgan	1999	51
47	Whizzer	Six Flags Great America	Schwarzkopf	1976	50
48	Mindbender	Galaxyland	Schwarzkopf	1985	47
49	Space Mountain	Disneyland	Dynamic Structures	1977	45
50	Katun	Mirabilandia	B&M	2000	44

Top 50 Wooden Roller Coasters
Rank	2009 Recipient	Park	Supplier	Year	Points
1	The Voyage	Holiday World & Splashin' Safari	The Gravity Group	2006	1,250
2	Boulder Dash	Lake Compounce	CCI	2000	1,049
3	El Toro	Six Flags Great Adventure	Intamin	2006	948
4	Phoenix	Knoebels Amusement Resort	PTC	1985	929
5	Thunderhead	Dollywood	GCII	2004	899
6	Ravine Flyer II	Waldameer & Water World	The Gravity Group	2008	617
7	The Beast	Kings Island		1979	604
8	Prowler	Worlds of Fun	GCII	2009	502
9	Hades	Mount Olympus Water & Theme Park	The Gravity Group	2005	487
10	Shivering Timbers	Michigan's Adventure	CCI	1998	475
11	The Raven	Holiday World & Splashin' Safari	CCI	1995	418
12	Lightning Racer	Hersheypark	GCII	2000	415
13	Evel Knievel	Six Flags St. Louis	GCII	2008	239
14	Cyclone	Astroland	Harry C. Baker	1927	227
15	The Legend	Holiday World & Splashin' Safari	CCI	2000	223
16	HellCat	Timber Falls Adventure Park	S&S	2004	194
17	Kentucky Rumbler	Beech Bend Park	GCII	2006	191
18	Colossos	Heide Park	Intamin	2001	187
19	GhostRider	Knott's Berry Farm	CCI	1998	176
20	Tremors	Silverwood Theme Park	CCI	1999	173
21	Balder	Liseberg	Intamin	2003	167
22	Giant Dipper	Santa Cruz Beach Boardwalk	Arthur Looff	1924	153
23	Thunderbolt	Kennywood	John Miller (rebuilt Andy Vettel)	1924 (rebuilt 1968)	141
24	Cornball Express	Indiana Beach	CCI	2001	133
25	Megafobia	Oakwood Theme Park	CCI	1996	124
26	Coaster	Playland	Carl Phare/Walker LeRoy	1958	121
27	Grand National	Blackpool Pleasure Beach	Charles Paige	1935	113
28	Rampage	Alabama Adventure	CCI	1998	112
29	The Comet	Great Escape	PTC	1994	108
30	Viper	Six Flags Great America		1995	104
31	Twister	Knoebels Amusement Resort		1999	102
32	Texas Giant	Six Flags Over Texas	Dinn	1990	101
33	The Boss	Six Flags St. Louis	CCI	2000	100
34	Thunderbird	PowerPark	GCII	2006	91
35	Troy	Toverland	GCII	2007	76
36	Ozark Wildcat	Celebration City	GCII	2003	72
37	Boardwalk Bullet	Kemah Boardwalk	Martin & Vleminckx	2007	64
38	Tonnerre de Zeus	Parc Astérix	CCI	1997	63
39	Jack Rabbit	Kennywood	Harry C. Baker	1921	59
40	Screamin' Eagle	Six Flags St. Louis	PTC	1976	58
41	Hurricane	Boomers! Dania Beach	Dinn	2000	57
42	Timber Terror	Silverwood Theme Park	CCI	1996	52
43	Terminator Salvation: The Ride	Six Flags Magic Mountain	GCII	2009	49
44	Georgia Cyclone	Six Flags Over Georgia	Dinn	1990	48
45	Renegade	Valleyfair	GCII	2007	46
46	T Express	Everland	Intamin	2008	44
47	Aska	Nara Dreamland	Intamin	1998	42
47	Blue Streak	Cedar Point	PTC	1964	42
49	Giant Dipper	Belmont Park	Frank Prior/Frederick Church	1925	39
50	Excalibur	Funtown Splashtown USA	CCI	1998	38

=== 2008 winners ===
2008 Golden Ticket Awards
Host Park: Give Kids The World Village

Category	Rank	2008 Recipient	Location	Vote
Best New Ride (Amusement Park)	1	Ravine Flyer II	Waldameer & Water World	53%
Best New Ride (Amusement Park)	2	Boardwalk Bullet	Kemah Boardwalk	11%
Best New Ride (Amusement Park)	3	Behemoth	Canada's Wonderland	10%
Best New Ride (Amusement Park)	4	Led Zeppelin The Ride	Freestyle Music Park	6%
Best New Ride (Amusement Park)	5	Evel Knievel	Six Flags St. Louis	5.5%
Best New Ride (Waterpark)	1	Dragon's Revenge	Schlitterbahn	52%
Best New Ride (Waterpark)	2	Dolphin Plunge	Aquatica	23%
Best New Ride (Waterpark)	3	Black Hole: The Next Generation	Wet 'n Wild Orlando	11%
Best New Ride (Waterpark)	4	Rock & Roll Island	Water Country USA	8%
Best New Ride (Waterpark)	5	Taumata Racer	Aquatica	5%
Best Park	1	Cedar Point	Sandusky, Ohio	26%
Best Park	2	Busch Gardens Europe	Williamsburg, Virginia	16%
Best Park	3	Knoebels Amusement Resort	Elysburg, Pennsylvania	7%
Best Park	4	Disneyland	Anaheim, California	6.5%
Best Park	5	Universal's Islands of Adventure	Orlando, Florida	6%
Best Park	5	Blackpool Pleasure Beach	Blackpool, England	6%
Best Park	7	Europa-Park	Rust, Germany	5.5%
Best Park	7	Kennywood	West Mifflin, Pennsylvania	5.5%
Best Park	9	Holiday World & Splashin' Safari	Santa Claus, Indiana	5%
Best Park	10	Dollywood	Pigeon Forge, Tennessee	4.8%
Best Waterpark	1	Schlitterbahn	New Braunfels, Texas	53%
Best Waterpark	2	Holiday World & Splashin' Safari	Santa Claus, Indiana	15%
Best Waterpark	3	Disney's Blizzard Beach	Orlando, Florida	9%
Best Waterpark	4	Noah's Ark	Wisconsin Dells, Wisconsin	8%
Best Waterpark	5	Typhoon Lagoon	Orlando, Florida	6%
Best Children's Park	1	Legoland California	Carlsbad, California	41%
Best Children's Park	2	Idlewild and Soak Zone	Ligonier, Pennsylvania	27%
Best Children's Park	3	Fårup Sommerland	Saltum, Denmark	10%
Best Children's Park	4	Dutch Wonderland	Lancaster, Pennsylvania	6%
Best Children's Park	5	Memphis Kiddie Park	Brooklyn, Ohio	5%
Best Children's Park	5	Sesame Place	Langhorne, Pennsylvania	5%
Best Marine Life Park	1	SeaWorld Orlando	Orlando, Florida	56%
Best Marine Life Park	2	SeaWorld San Antonio	San Antonio	14%
Best Marine Life Park	3	SeaWorld San Diego	San Diego	10%
Best Marine Life Park	4	Discovery Cove	Orlando, Florida	8%
Best Marine Life Park	4	Six Flags Discovery Kingdom	Vallejo, California	8%
Best Seaside Park	1	Santa Cruz Beach Boardwalk	Santa Cruz, California	46%
Best Seaside Park	2	Blackpool Pleasure Beach	Blackpool, England	30%
Best Seaside Park	3	Morey's Piers	Wildwood, New Jersey	15%
Best Seaside Park	4	Kemah Boardwalk	Kemah, Texas	4%
Best Indoor Waterpark	1	Schlitterbahn Galveston Island	Galveston, Texas	25%
Best Indoor Waterpark	2	World Waterpark	Edmonton, Canada	18%
Best Indoor Waterpark	3	Kalahari Resort	Sandusky, Ohio	15%
Best Indoor Waterpark	4	Kalahari Resort	Wisconsin Dells, Wisconsin	12%
Best Indoor Waterpark	5	Castaway Bay	Sandusky, Ohio	11%
Friendliest Park	1	Holiday World & Splashin' Safari	Santa Claus, Indiana	32%
Friendliest Park	2	Dollywood	Pigeon Forge, Tennessee	27%
Friendliest Park	3	Knoebels Amusement Resort	Elysburg, Pennsylvania	13%
Friendliest Park	4	Silver Dollar City	Branson, Missouri	6%
Friendliest Park	5	Beech Bend Park	Bowling Green, Kentucky	4%
Cleanest Park	1	Holiday World & Splashin' Safari	Santa Claus, Indiana	35%
Cleanest Park	2	Busch Gardens Europe	Williamsburg, Virginia	16%
Cleanest Park	3	Dollywood	Pigeon Forge, Tennessee	11%
Cleanest Park	3	Magic Kingdom	Orlando, Florida	11%
Cleanest Park	5	Disneyland	Anaheim, California	9%
Best Shows	1	Six Flags Fiesta Texas	San Antonio, Texas	27%
Best Shows	2	Dollywood	Pigeon Forge, Tennessee	24%
Best Shows	3	Disney's Hollywood Studios	Orlando, Florida	12%
Best Shows	4	Silver Dollar City	Branson, Missouri	10%
Best Shows	5	Busch Gardens Europe	Williamsburg, Virginia	8%
Best Food	1	Knoebels Amusement Resort	Elysburg, Pennsylvania	28%
Best Food	2	Dollywood	Pigeon Forge, Tennessee	19%
Best Food	3	Epcot	Orlando, Florida	18%
Best Food	4	Silver Dollar City	Branson, Missouri	13%
Best Food	5	Busch Gardens Europe	Williamsburg, Virginia	8%
Best Water Ride (Park)	1	Dudley Do-Right's Ripsaw Falls	Universal's Islands of Adventure	34%
Best Water Ride (Park)	2	Valhalla	Blackpool Pleasure Beach	22%
Best Water Ride (Park)	3	Splash Mountain	Magic Kingdom	13%
Best Water Ride (Park)	4	Popeye and Bluto's Bilge-Rat Barges	Universal's Islands of Adventure	9%
Best Water Ride (Park)	5	Journey to Atlantis	SeaWorld Orlando	8%
Best Waterpark Ride	1	Master Blaster	Schlitterbahn	25%
Best Waterpark Ride	2	ZOOMbabwe	Holiday World & Splashin' Safari	20%
Best Waterpark Ride	3	Deluge	Kentucky Kingdom	14%
Best Waterpark Ride	4	Dragon's Revenge	Schlitterbahn	12%
Best Waterpark Ride	5	Black Anaconda	Noah's Ark	7%
Best Kids' Area	1	Kings Island	Mason, Ohio	38%
Best Kids' Area	2	Universal's Islands of Adventure	Orlando, Florida	21%
Best Kids' Area	3	Knott's Berry Farm	Buena Park, California	8%
Best Kids' Area	4	Kings Dominion	Doswell, Virginia	7.5%
Best Kids' Area	4	Nickelodeon Universe	Bloomington, Minnesota	7.5%
Best Landscaping	1	Busch Gardens Europe	Williamsburg, Virginia	38%
Best Landscaping	2	Efteling	Kaatsheuvel, Netherlands	25%
Best Landscaping	3	Gilroy Gardens	Gilroy, California	18%
Best Landscaping	4	Dollywood	Pigeon Forge, Tennessee	7%
Best Landscaping	5	Epcot	Orlando, Florida	5%
Best Outdoor Show Production	1	Epcot	Epcot	38%
Best Outdoor Show Production	2	Six Flags Fiesta Texas	San Antonio, Texas	22%
Best Outdoor Show Production	3	Disneyland	Anaheim, California	13%
Best Outdoor Show Production	4	Freestyle Music Park	Myrtle Beach, South Carolina	10%
Best Outdoor Show Production	5	Disney's Hollywood Studios	Orlando, Florida	8%
Best Dark Ride	1	The Amazing Adventures of Spider-Man	Universal's Islands of Adventure	36%
Best Dark Ride	2	Twilight Zone Tower of Terror	Disney's Hollywood Studios	17%
Best Dark Ride	3	Haunted Mansion	Knoebels Amusement Resort	13%
Best Dark Ride	4	Nights in White Satin: The Trip	Freestyle Music Park	12%
Best Dark Ride	5	Pirates of the Caribbean	Disneyland	7%
Best Halloween Event	1	Universal Orlando Resort	Orlando, Florida	29%
Best Halloween Event	2	Knott's Berry Farm	Buena Park, California	22%
Best Halloween Event	3	Knoebels Amusement Resort	Elysburg, Pennsylvania	16%
Best Halloween Event	4	Kennywood	West Mifflin, Pennsylvania	12%
Best Halloween Event	5	Cedar Point	Sandusky, Ohio	6%
Best Christmas Event	1	Dollywood	Pigeon Forge, Tennessee	38%
Best Christmas Event	2	Magic Kingdom	Orlando, Florida	17%
Best Christmas Event	3	Disneyland	Anaheim, California	14%
Best Christmas Event	4	Silver Dollar City	Branson, Missouri	10%
Best Christmas Event	5	Hersheypark	Hershey, Pennsylvania	7%
Best Carousel	1	Knoebels Amusement Resort	Elysburg, Pennsylvania	48%
Best Carousel	2	Santa Cruz Beach Boardwalk	Santa Cruz, California	21%
Best Carousel	3	Six Flags Over Georgia	Austell, Georgia	9%
Best Carousel	4	Universal's Islands of Adventure	Orlando, Florida	7%
Best Carousel	5	Six Flags Great America	Gurnee, Illinois	6%
Best Indoor Coaster	1	Revenge of the Mummy: The Ride	Universal Studios Florida	28%
Best Indoor Coaster	2	Rock 'n' Roller Coaster Starring Aerosmith	Disney's Hollywood Studios	15%
Best Indoor Coaster	3	Space Mountain	Disneyland	14%
Best Indoor Coaster	4	Mindbender	Galaxyland	11%
Best Indoor Coaster	5	Exterminator	Kennywood	10%
Best Funhouse/Walk-Through Attraction	1	Frankenstein's Castle	Indiana Beach	36%
Best Funhouse/Walk-Through Attraction	2	Noah's Ark	Kennywood	33%
Best Funhouse/Walk-Through Attraction	3	Hotel Gasten	Liseberg	10%
Best Funhouse/Walk-Through Attraction	3	Lustiga Huset	Gröna Lund	10%

Top 50 Steel Roller Coasters
Rank	2008 Recipient	Park	Supplier	Year	Points
1	Superman: Ride of Steel	Six Flags New England	Intamin	2000	1,363
2	Millennium Force	Cedar Point	Intamin	2000	1,107
3	Nitro	Six Flags Great Adventure	B&M	2001	838
4	Apollo's Chariot	Busch Gardens Europe	B&M	1999	718
5	Expedition GeForce	Holiday Park	Intamin	2001	651
6	Goliath	Six Flags Over Georgia	B&M	2006	646
7	Magnum XL-200	Cedar Point	Arrow Dynamics	1989	518
8	Phantom's Revenge	Kennywood	Arrow Dynamics (rebuilt Morgan)	1991 (rebuilt 2001)	428
9	Top Thrill Dragster	Cedar Point	Intamin	2003	366
10	Montu	Busch Gardens Africa	B&M	1996	343
11	Raging Bull	Six Flags Great America	B&M	1999	278
12	Maverick	Cedar Point	Intamin	2007	254
13	Nemesis	Alton Towers	B&M	1994	246
14	Dragon Challenge	Universal's Islands of Adventure	B&M	1999	239
15	Mind Bender	Six Flags Over Georgia	Schwarzkopf	1978	232
16	X²	Six Flags Magic Mountain	Arrow Dynamics	2002	227
17	Ride of Steel	Darien Lake	Intamin	1999	205
18	Steel Force	Dorney Park & Wildwater Kingdom	Morgan	1997	186
19	SheiKra	Busch Gardens Africa	B&M	2005	174
20	Griffon	Busch Gardens Europe	B&M	2007	170
21	Superman: Ride of Steel	Six Flags America	Intamin	2000	169
22	Alpengeist	Busch Gardens Europe	B&M	1997	161
22	Raptor	Cedar Point	B&M	1994	161
24	Titan	Six Flags Over Texas	Giovanola	2001	149
25	Kingda Ka	Six Flags Great Adventure	Intamin	2005	143
26	The Incredible Hulk Coaster	Universal's Islands of Adventure	B&M	1999	141
27	Kumba	Busch Gardens Africa	B&M	1993	139
28	Goliath	La Ronde	B&M	2006	133
29	Behemoth	Canada's Wonderland	B&M	2008	123
30	Goliath	Six Flags Magic Mountain	Giovanola	2000	110
31	Shock Wave	Six Flags Over Texas	Schwarzkopf	1978	102
32	Goliath	Walibi Holland	Intamin	2002	100
33	Volcano, The Blast Coaster	Kings Dominion	Intamin	1998	96
34	Big Bad Wolf	Busch Gardens Europe	Arrow Dynamics	1984	87
35	Expedition Everest	Disney's Animal Kingdom	Vekoma	2006	85
36	Tatsu	Six Flags Magic Mountain	B&M	2006	82
37	Xcelerator	Knott's Berry Farm	Intamin	2002	73
38	Storm Runner	Hersheypark	Intamin	2004	66
39	Afterburn	Carowinds	B&M	1999	64
40	Euro-Mir	Europa-Park	Mack Rides	1998	63
40	Mamba	Worlds of Fun	Morgan	1998	63
42	Kraken	SeaWorld Orlando	B&M	2000	59
43	Dominator	Kings Dominion	B&M	2008	57
43	Mindbender	Galaxyland	Schwarzkopf	1985	57
45	Whizzer	Six Flags Great America	Schwarzkopf	1976	55
46	Fahrenheit	Hersheypark	Intamin	2008	52
47	Big One	Blackpool Pleasure Beach	Arrow Dynamics	1994	51
47	Mystery Mine	Dollywood	Gerstlauer	2007	51
49	Powder Keg	Silver Dollar City	S&S	2005	50
50	Superman: Krypton Coaster	Six Flags Fiesta Texas	B&M	2000	46

Top 50 Wooden Roller Coasters
Rank	2008 Recipient	Park	Supplier	Year	Points
1	The Voyage	Holiday World & Splashin' Safari	The Gravity Group	2006	1,225
2	Thunderhead	Dollywood	GCII	2004	1,047
3	Phoenix	Knoebels Amusement Resort	PTC	1985	1,029
4	El Toro	Six Flags Great Adventure	Intamin	2006	993
5	Boulder Dash	Lake Compounce	CCI	2000	861
6	Hades	Mount Olympus Water & Theme Park	The Gravity Group	2005	677
7	Shivering Timbers	Michigan's Adventure	CCI	1998	523
8	The Beast	Kings Island		1979	471
9	Lightning Racer	Hersheypark	GCII	2000	447
10	The Raven	Holiday World & Splashin' Safari	CCI	1995	428
11	Ravine Flyer II	Waldameer & Water World	The Gravity Group	2008	427
12	Avalanche	Timber Falls Adventure Park	S&S	2004	287
13	Kentucky Rumbler	Beech Bend Park	GCII	2006	272
14	The Legend	Holiday World & Splashin' Safari	CCI	2000	249
15	Balder	Liseberg	Intamin	2003	237
16	Cyclone	Astroland	Harry C. Baker	1927	227
17	Tremors	Silverwood Theme Park	CCI	1999	218
18	Colossos	Heide Park	Intamin	2001	187
19	Thunderbolt	Kennywood	John Miller (rebuilt Andy Vettel)	1924 (rebuilt 1968)	186
20	Ozark Wildcat	Celebration City	GCII	2003	182
20	Rampage	Alabama Adventure	CCI	1998	182
22	Megafobia	Oakwood Theme Park	CCI	1996	177
23	Giant Dipper	Santa Cruz Beach Boardwalk	Arthur Looff	1924	170
24	GhostRider	Knott's Berry Farm	CCI	1998	163
25	Cornball Express	Indiana Beach	CCI	2001	156
26	Troy	Toverland	GCII	2007	148
27	Grand National	Blackpool Pleasure Beach	Charles Paige	1935	139
28	Texas Giant	Six Flags Over Texas	Dinn	1990	134
29	The Comet	Great Escape	PTC	1994	131
30	Viper	Six Flags Great America		1995	128
31	Coaster	Playland	Carl Phare/Walker LeRoy	1958	118
32	Twister	Knoebels Amusement Resort		1999	96
33	Tonnerre de Zeus	Parc Astérix	CCI	1997	93
34	Jack Rabbit	Kennywood	Harry C. Baker	1921	88
35	Renegade	Valleyfair	GCII	2007	81
35	Thunderbird	PowerPark	GCII	2006	81
37	Hurricane	Boomers! Dania Beach	Dinn	2000	78
38	Aska	Nara Dreamland	Intamin	1998	73
39	Boardwalk Bullet	Kemah Boardwalk	Martin & Vleminckx	2007	66
40	Georgia Cyclone	Six Flags Over Georgia	Dinn	1990	63
41	Blue Streak	Cedar Point	PTC	1964	58
42	Grizzly	Kings Dominion	KECO	1982	55
43	Timber Terror	Silverwood Theme Park	CCI	1996	51
44	Evel Knievel	Six Flags St. Louis	GCII	2008	50
45	Wildcat	Hersheypark	GCII	1996	44
46	The Boss	Six Flags St. Louis	CCI	2000	43
47	Racer	Kennywood	Charlie Mach	1927	42
48	Screamin' Eagle	Six Flags St. Louis	PTC	1976	40
49	Great American Scream Machine	Six Flags Over Georgia	PTC	1973	35
49	New Mexico Rattler	Cliff's Amusement Park		2002	35

=== 2007 winners ===
2007 Golden Ticket Awards
Host Park: Dollywood

Category	Rank	2007 Recipient	Location	Vote
Best New Ride (Amusement Park)	1	Maverick	Cedar Point	42%
Best New Ride (Amusement Park)	2	Mystery Mine	Dollywood	23%
Best New Ride (Amusement Park)	3	Griffon	Busch Gardens Europe	17%
Best New Ride (Amusement Park)	4	Renegade	Valleyfair	5%
Best New Ride (Amusement Park)	5	Troy	Toverland	3%
Best New Ride (Waterpark)	1	Bakuli	Splashin' Safari	40%
Best New Ride (Waterpark)	2	Deluge	Six Flags Kentucky Kingdom	30%
Best New Ride (Waterpark)	3	Brainwash	Wet 'n Wild Orlando	11%
Best New Ride (Waterpark)	4	East Coaster Waterworks	Hersheypark	6%
Best New Ride (Waterpark)	5	Poseidon's Rage	Mt. Olympus	3%
Best Park	1	Cedar Point	Sandusky, Ohio	33%
Best Park	2	Knoebels Amusement Resort	Elysburg, Pennsylvania	10%
Best Park	3	Universal's Islands of Adventure	Orlando, Florida	9%
Best Park	4	Holiday World	Santa Claus, Indiana	7%
Best Park	5	Disneyland	Anaheim, California	6%
Best Park	5	Blackpool Pleasure Beach	Blackpool, England	6%
Best Park	7	Kennywood	West Mifflin, Pennsylvania	5%
Best Park	8	Busch Gardens Europe	Williamsburg, Virginia	4.5%
Best Park	9	Europa-Park	Rust, Germany	4%
Best Park	10	Magic Kingdom	Orlando, Florida	3%
Best Park	10	Tokyo DisneySea	Tokyo, Japan	3%
Best Waterpark	1	Schlitterbahn	New Braunfels, Texas	45%
Best Waterpark	2	Holiday World & Splashin' Safari	Santa Claus, Indiana	23%
Best Waterpark	3	Disney's Blizzard Beach	Orlando, Florida	9%
Best Waterpark	4	Noah's Ark	Wisconsin Dells, Wisconsin	4%
Best Waterpark	4	Typhoon Lagoon	Orlando, Florida	4%
Best Children's Park	1	Legoland California	Carlsbad, California	51%
Best Children's Park	2	Idlewild and Soak Zone	Ligonier, Pennsylvania	15%
Best Children's Park	3	Fårup Sommerland	Saltum, Denmark	7%
Best Children's Park	3	Sesame Place	Langhorne, Pennsylvania	7%
Best Children's Park	4	Memphis Kiddie Park	Brooklyn, Ohio	5%
Best Marine Life Park	1	SeaWorld Orlando	Orlando, Florida	57%
Best Marine Life Park	2	SeaWorld San Antonio	San Antonio	26%
Best Marine Life Park	3	SeaWorld San Diego	San Diego	8%
Best Marine Life Park	4	Six Flags Discovery Kingdom	Vallejo, California	6%
Best Marine Life Park	5	Marineland	Ontario, Canada	3%
Best Seaside Park	1	Santa Cruz Beach Boardwalk	Santa Cruz, California	49%
Best Seaside Park	2	Blackpool Pleasure Beach	Blackpool, England	21%
Best Seaside Park	3	Morey's Piers	Wildwood, New Jersey	12%
Best Seaside Park	4	Belmont Park	San Diego, California	4%
Best Seaside Park	5	Kemah Boardwalk	Kemah, Texas	3%
Best Indoor Waterpark	1	World Waterpark	Edmonton, Canada	18%
Best Indoor Waterpark	2	Schlitterbahn Galveston Island	Galveston, Texas	12%
Best Indoor Waterpark	3	Castaway Bay	Sandusky, Ohio	10%
Best Indoor Waterpark	3	Kalahari Resort	Sandusky, Ohio	10%
Best Indoor Waterpark	5	Great Wolf Lodge	Sandusky, Ohio	6%
Best Indoor Waterpark	5	Kalahari Resort	Wisconsin Dells, Wisconsin	6%
Best Indoor Waterpark	5	Splash Landings/Alton Towers	Staffordshire, England	6%
Friendliest Park	1	Holiday World & Splashin' Safari	Santa Claus, Indiana	48%
Friendliest Park	2	Dollywood	Pigeon Forge, Tennessee	20%
Friendliest Park	3	Knoebels Amusement Resort	Elysburg, Pennsylvania	5%
Friendliest Park	4	Silver Dollar City	Branson, Missouri	4%
Friendliest Park	5	Disneyland	Anaheim, California	3%
Friendliest Park	5	Beech Bend Park	Bowling Green, Kentucky	3%
Cleanest Park	1	Holiday World & Splashin' Safari	Santa Claus, Indiana	49%
Cleanest Park	2	Busch Gardens Europe	Williamsburg, Virginia	14%
Cleanest Park	3	Disneyland	Anaheim, California	6%
Cleanest Park	3	Magic Kingdom	Orlando, Florida	6%
Cleanest Park	5	Dollywood	Pigeon Forge, Tennessee	4%
Best Shows	1	Six Flags Fiesta Texas	San Antonio, Texas	29%
Best Shows	2	Dollywood	Pigeon Forge, Tennessee	27%
Best Shows	3	Busch Gardens Europe	Williamsburg, Virginia	8%
Best Shows	3	Silver Dollar City	Branson, Missouri	8%
Best Shows	5	Disney's Hollywood Studios	Orlando, Florida	6%
Best Food	1	Knoebels Amusement Resort	Elysburg, Pennsylvania	25%
Best Food	2	Epcot	Orlando, Florida	15%
Best Food	3	Dollywood	Pigeon Forge, Tennessee	14%
Best Food	4	Busch Gardens Europe	Williamsburg, Virginia	11%
Best Food	5	Silver Dollar City	Branson, Missouri	9%
Best Water Ride (Park)	1	Dudley Do-Right's Ripsaw Falls	Universal's Islands of Adventure	26%
Best Water Ride (Park)	2	Valhalla	Blackpool Pleasure Beach	17%
Best Water Ride (Park)	3	Splash Mountain	Magic Kingdom	8%
Best Water Ride (Park)	4	Popeye and Bluto's Bilge-Rat Barges	Universal's Islands of Adventure	6%
Best Water Ride (Park)	5	Journey to Atlantis	SeaWorld Orlando	5%
Best Waterpark Ride	1	Master Blaster	Schlitterbahn	32%
Best Waterpark Ride	2	Deluge	Kentucky Kingdom	10%
Best Waterpark Ride	3	ZOOMbabwe	Holiday World & Splashin' Safari	8%
Best Waterpark Ride	4	Bakuli	Holiday World & Splashin' Safari	7%
Best Waterpark Ride	4	Summit Plummet	Blizzard Beach	7%
Best Kids' Area	1	Kings Island	Kings Mills, Ohio	54%
Best Kids' Area	2	Universal's Islands of Adventure	Orlando, Florida	10%
Best Kids' Area	3	Carowinds	Charlotte, North Carolina	5%
Best Kids' Area	4	Idlewild	Ligonier, Pennsylvania	4%
Best Kids' Area	4	Knott's Berry Farm	Buena Park, California	4%
Best Landscaping (Park)	1	Busch Gardens Europe	Williamsburg, Virginia	43%
Best Landscaping (Park)	2	Gilroy Gardens	Gilroy, California	16%
Best Landscaping (Park)	3	Efteling	Kaatsheuvel, Netherlands	10%
Best Landscaping (Park)	4	Epcot	Orlando, Florida	5%
Best Landscaping (Park)	4	Busch Gardens Africa	Buena Park, California	5%
Best Outdoor Show Production	1	IllumiNations: Reflections of Earth	Epcot	37%
Best Outdoor Show Production	2	Six Flags Fiesta Texas	San Antonio, Texas	16%
Best Outdoor Show Production	3	Disneyland	Anaheim, California	13%
Best Outdoor Show Production	4	Disney's Hollywood Studios	Orlando, Florida	11%
Best Outdoor Show Production	5	Cedar Point	Sandusky, Ohio	7%
Best Dark Ride	1	The Amazing Adventures of Spider-Man	Universal's Islands of Adventure	37%
Best Dark Ride	2	Haunted Mansion	Knoebels Amusement Resort	20%
Best Dark Ride	3	Twilight Zone Tower of Terror	Disney's Hollywood Studios	7%
Best Dark Ride	4	Indiana Jones Adventure: Temple of the Forbidden Eye	Disneyland	5%
Best Dark Ride	5	Pirates of the Caribbean	Disneyland	4%
Best Halloween Event	1	Knott's Berry Farm	Buena Park, California	26%
Best Halloween Event	2	Universal Orlando Resort	Orlando, Florida	25%
Best Halloween Event	3	Kennywood	West Mifflin, Pennsylvania	11%
Best Halloween Event	4	Knoebels Amusement Resort	Elysburg, Pennsylvania	9%
Best Halloween Event	5	Cedar Point	Sandusky, Ohio	7%
Best Carousel	1	Grand Carousel	Knoebels Amusement Resort	40%
Best Carousel	2	Looff Carousel	Santa Cruz Beach Boardwalk	18%
Best Carousel	3	The Riverview Carousel	Six Flags Over Georgia	8%
Best Carousel	4	Caro-Seuss-El	Universal's Islands of Adventure	5%
Best Carousel	5	Columbia Carousel	Six Flags Great America	4%
Best Indoor Coaster	1	Rock 'n' Roller Coaster Starring Aerosmith	Disney's Hollywood Studios	17%
Best Indoor Coaster	2	Revenge of the Mummy: The Ride	Universal Studios Florida	16%
Best Indoor Coaster	2	Space Mountain	Disneyland	16%
Best Indoor Coaster	4	Space Mountain	Magic Kingdom	13%
Best Indoor Coaster	5	Exterminator	Kennywood	8%

Top 50 Steel Roller Coasters
Rank	2007 Recipient	Park	Supplier	Year	Points
1	Superman: Ride of Steel	Six Flags New England	Intamin	2000	1,181
2	Millennium Force	Cedar Point	Intamin	2000	1,083
3	Nitro	Six Flags Great Adventure	B&M	2001	733
4	Apollo's Chariot	Busch Gardens Europe	B&M	1999	616
5	Magnum XL-200	Cedar Point	Arrow Dynamics	1989	589
6	Expedition GeForce	Holiday Park	Intamin	2001	542
7	Phantom's Revenge	Kennywood	Arrow Dynamics (rebuilt Morgan)	1991 (rebuilt 2001)	439
8	Goliath	Six Flags Over Georgia	B&M	2006	392
9	Top Thrill Dragster	Cedar Point	Intamin	2003	372
10	Montu	Busch Gardens Africa	B&M	1996	309
11	Ride of Steel	Darien Lake	Intamin	1999	255
12	Raging Bull	Six Flags Great America	B&M	1999	249
13	Maverick	Cedar Point	Intamin	2007	220
14	Nemesis	Alton Towers	B&M	1994	219
14	Superman: Ride of Steel	Six Flags America	Intamin	2000	219
16	SheiKra	Busch Gardens Africa	B&M	2005	208
17	X	Six Flags Magic Mountain	Arrow Dynamics	2002	198
18	Alpengeist	Busch Gardens Europe	B&M	1997	183
19	Raptor	Cedar Point	B&M	1994	170
20	Steel Force	Dorney Park & Wildwater Kingdom	Morgan	1997	167
21	Kumba	Busch Gardens Africa	B&M	1993	165
22	Mind Bender	Six Flags Over Georgia	Schwarzkopf	1978	149
23	Dueling Dragons	Universal's Islands of Adventure	B&M	1999	140
24	Goliath	Six Flags Magic Mountain	Giovanola	2000	130
24	Xcelerator	Knott's Berry Farm	Intamin	2002	130
26	Titan	Six Flags Over Texas	Giovanola	2001	119
27	Griffon	Busch Gardens Europe	B&M	2007	106
28	Volcano, The Blast Coaster	Kings Dominion	Intamin	1998	104
29	Goliath	Walibi World	Intamin	2002	95
30	The Incredible Hulk Coaster	Universal's Islands of Adventure	B&M	1999	89
31	Kingda Ka	Six Flags Great Adventure	Intamin	2005	87
32	Big Bad Wolf	Busch Gardens Europe	Arrow Dynamics	1984	84
32	Expedition Everest	Disney's Animal Kingdom	Vekoma	2006	84
32	Powder Keg	Silver Dollar City	S&S	2005	84
35	Shock Wave	Six Flags Over Texas	Schwarzkopf	1978	81
36	Superman: Krypton Coaster	Six Flags Fiesta Texas	B&M	2000	80
37	Goliath	La Ronde	B&M	2006	76
38	Storm Runner	Hersheypark	Intamin	2004	75
39	Mamba	Worlds of Fun	Morgan	1998	66
40	Kraken	SeaWorld Orlando	B&M	2000	64
41	Tatsu	Six Flags Magic Mountain	B&M	2006	63
41	Top Gun: The Jet Coaster	Carowinds	B&M	1999	63
43	Medusa	Six Flags Great Adventure	B&M	1999	57
44	Big One	Blackpool Pleasure Beach	Arrow Dynamics	1994	56
45	Revenge of the Mummy: The Ride	Universal Studios Florida	Premier Rides	2004	49
46	Steel Eel	SeaWorld San Antonio	Morgan	1999	47
47	Mystery Mine	Dollywood	Gerstlauer	2007	45
48	Mindbender	Galaxyland	Schwarzkopf	1985	43
49	California Screamin'	Disney's California Adventure	Intamin	2001	42
50	Katun	Mirabilandia	B&M	2000	41

Top 50 Wooden Roller Coasters
Rank	2007 Recipient	Park	Supplier	Year	Points
1	The Voyage	Holiday World & Splashin' Safari	The Gravity Group	2006	1,240
2	Thunderhead	Dollywood	GCII	2004	932
3	Phoenix	Knoebels Amusement Resort	PTC	1985	844
4	Boulder Dash	Lake Compounce	CCI	2000	740
5	Hades	Mount Olympus Water & Theme Park	The Gravity Group	2005	702
6	Shivering Timbers	Michigan's Adventure	CCI	1998	550
7	The Raven	Holiday World & Splashin' Safari	CCI	1995	548
8	The Beast	Kings Island		1979	506
9	El Toro	Six Flags Great Adventure	Intamin	2006	494
10	Lightning Racer	Hersheypark	GCII	2000	402
11	The Legend	Holiday World & Splashin' Safari	CCI	2000	358
12	Avalanche	Timber Falls Adventure Park	S&S	2004	313
13	Kentucky Rumbler	Beech Bend Park	GCII	2006	308
14	Cyclone	Astroland	Harry C. Baker	1927	257
15	Balder	Liseberg	Intamin	2003	193
16	Tremors	Silverwood Theme Park	CCI	1999	188
17	GhostRider	Knott's Berry Farm	CCI	1998	176
18	Ozark Wildcat	Celebration City	GCII	2003	170
19	The Comet	Great Escape	PTC	1994	169
20	Texas Giant	Six Flags Over Texas	Dinn	1990	164
21	Thunderbolt	Kennywood	John Miller (rebuilt Andy Vettel)	1924 (rebuilt 1968)	149
22	Giant Dipper	Santa Cruz Beach Boardwalk	Arthur Looff	1924	137
23	Colossos	Heide Park	Intamin	2001	136
24	Cornball Express	Indiana Beach	CCI	2001	134
25	Megafobia	Oakwood Theme Park	CCI	1996	121
26	Tonnerre de Zeus	Parc Astérix	CCI	1997	112
27	Rampage	Alabama Adventure	CCI	1998	93
28	Grand National	Blackpool Pleasure Beach	Charles Paige	1935	88
29	Coaster	Playland	Carl Phare/Walker LeRoy	1958	87
30	Twister	Knoebels Amusement Resort		1999	86
31	Thunderbird	PowerPark	GCII	2006	76
32	The Boss	Six Flags St. Louis	CCI	2000	74
33	Jack Rabbit	Kennywood	Harry C. Baker	1921	71
34	Aska	Nara Dreamland	Intamin	1998	68
35	New Mexico Rattler	Cliff's Amusement Park		2002	64
36	Timber Terror	Silverwood Theme Park	CCI	1996	61
37	Viper	Six Flags Great America		1995	58
38	Wildcat	Hersheypark	GCII	1996	57
39	Mean Streak	Cedar Point	Dinn	1991	54
40	Gwazi	Busch Gardens Africa	GCII	1999	51
40	Hurricane	Boomers! Dania Beach	Dinn	2000	51
42	Roar	Six Flags America	GCII	1998	47
43	Georgia Cyclone	Six Flags Over Georgia	Dinn	1990	46
44	Great American Scream Machine	Six Flags Over Georgia	PTC	1973	45
45	The Racer	Kings Island	PTC	1972	44
46	Big Dipper	Geauga Lake	John Miller	1925	42
47	Roar	Six Flags Discovery Kingdom	GCII	1999	38
48	Blue Streak	Cedar Point	PTC	1964	35
49	Racer	Kennywood	Charlie Mach	1927	34
49	Thundercoaster	Tusenfryd	Vekoma	2001	34

=== 2006 winners ===
2006 Golden Ticket Awards
Host Park: Holiday World & Splashin' Safari

Category	Rank	2006 Recipient	Location/Park	Vote
Best Amusement Park	1	Cedar Point	Sandusky, Ohio	37%
Best Amusement Park	2	Blackpool Pleasure Beach	Blackpool, England	10%
Best Amusement Park	3	Knoebels Amusement Resort	Elysburg, Pennsylvania	8%
Best Amusement Park	4	Universal's Islands of Adventure	Orlando, Florida	7%
Best Amusement Park	5	Disneyland	Anaheim, California	6%
Best Amusement Park	6	Kennywood	West Mifflin, Pennsylvania	6%
Best Amusement Park	6	Europa Park	Rust, Germany	6%
Best Amusement Park	8	Holiday World & Splashin' Safari	Santa Claus, Indiana	5%
Best Amusement Park	8	Busch Gardens Europe	Williamsburg, Virginia	5%
Best Amusement Park	10	Magic Kingdom	Orlando, Florida	3%
Best Waterpark	1	Schlitterbahn	New Braunfels, Texas	52%
Best Waterpark	2	Holiday World & Splashin' Safari	Santa Claus, Indiana	22%
Best Waterpark	3	Disney's Blizzard Beach	Orlando, Florida	6%
Best Waterpark	4	Noah's Ark	Wisconsin Dells, Wisconsin	5%
Best Waterpark	5	Disney's Typhoon Lagoon	Orlando, Florida	4%
Best Children's Park	1	Legoland California	Carlsbad, California	43%
Best Children's Park	2	Idlewild	Ligonier, Pennsylvania	15%
Best Children's Park	3	Memphis Kiddie Park	Cleveland, Ohio	8%
Best Children's Park	3	Sesame Place	Langhorne, Pennsylvania	8%
Best Children's Park	5	Kiddieland Amusement Park	Melrose Park, Illinois	6%
Best Marine Life Park	1	SeaWorld Orlando	Orlando, Florida	65%
Best Marine Life Park	2	SeaWorld San Antonio	San Antonio, Texas	15%
Best Marine Life Park	3	SeaWorld San Diego	San Diego, California	8%
Best Marine Life Park	4	Marineland	Niagara Falls, Ontario	6%
Best Marine Life Park	4	Six Flags Marine World	Vallejo, California	6%
Best Kids' Area	1	Paramount's Kings Island	Kings Mills, Ohio	53%
Best Kids' Area	2	Universal's Islands of Adventure	Orlando, Florida	11%
Best Kids' Area	3	Paramount's Carowinds	Charlotte, North Carolina	6%
Best Kids' Area	4	Paramount's Kings Dominion	Doswell, Virginia	5%
Best Kids' Area	5	Idlewild	Ligonier, Pennsylvania	4%
Friendliest Park	1	Holiday World & Splashin' Safari	Santa Claus, Indiana	44%
Friendliest Park	2	Dollywood	Pigeon Forge, Tennessee	20%
Friendliest Park	3	Cedar Point	Sandusky, Ohio	11%
Friendliest Park	4	Knoebels Amusement Resort	Elysburg, Pennsylvania	5%
Friendliest Park	4	Magic Kingdom	Orlando, Florida	5%
Cleanest Park	1	Holiday World & Splashin' Safari	Santa Claus, Indiana	46%
Cleanest Park	2	Busch Gardens Europe	Williamsburg, Virginia	10%
Cleanest Park	3	Disneyland	Anaheim, California	9%
Cleanest Park	4	Magic Kingdom	Orlando, Florida	7%
Cleanest Park	5	Epcot	Orlando, Florida	5%
Best Halloween Event	1	Universal Orlando Resort	Orlando, Florida	23%
Best Halloween Event	2	Knott's Berry Farm	Buena Park, California	22%
Best Halloween Event	3	Kennywood	West Mifflin, Pennsylvania	13%
Best Halloween Event	4	Knoebels Amusement Resort	Elysburg, Pennsylvania	11%
Best Halloween Event	5	Cedar Point	Sandusky, Ohio	9%
Best Landscaping — Amusement Park	1	Busch Gardens Europe	Williamsburg, Virginia	44%
Best Landscaping — Amusement Park	2	Efteling	Kaatsheuvel, The Netherlands	14%
Best Landscaping — Amusement Park	3	Bonfante Gardens	Gilroy, California	8%
Best Landscaping — Amusement Park	4	Busch Gardens Africa	Tampa, Florida	6%
Best Landscaping — Amusement Park	5	Dollywood	Pigeon Forge, Tennessee	4%
Best Landscaping — Waterpark	1	Schlitterbahn	New Braunfels, Texas	29%
Best Landscaping — Waterpark	2	Disney's Blizzard Beach	Orlando, Florida	20%
Best Landscaping — Waterpark	3	Disney's Typhoon Lagoon	Orlando, Florida	17%
Best Landscaping — Waterpark	4	Holiday World & Splashin' Safari	Santa Claus, Indiana	8%
Best Landscaping — Waterpark	5	Boomerang Bay	Kings Mills, Ohio	4%
Best Food	1	Knoebels Amusement Resort	Elysburg, Pennsylvania	24%
Best Food	2	Epcot	Orlando, Florida	17%
Best Food	3	Dollywood	Pigeon Forge, Tennessee	10%
Best Food	4	Busch Gardens Europe	Williamsburg, Virginia	9%
Best Food	4	Silver Dollar City	Branson, Missouri	9%
Best Shows	1	Six Flags Fiesta Texas	San Antonio, Texas	28%
Best Shows	2	Dollywood	Pigeon Forge, Tennessee	21%
Best Shows	3	Busch Gardens Europe	Williamsburg, Virginia	10%
Best Shows	4	Silver Dollar City	Branson, Missouri	6%
Best Shows	5	Disney-MGM Studios	Orlando, Florida	5%
Best Outdoor Night Show Production	1	Epcot	Orlando, Florida	31%
Best Outdoor Night Show Production	2	Six Flags Fiesta Texas	San Antonio, Texas	22%
Best Outdoor Night Show Production	3	Disneyland	Anaheim, California	14%
Best Outdoor Night Show Production	4	Cedar Point	Sandusky, Ohio	10%
Best Outdoor Night Show Production	4	Disney-MGM Studios	Orlando, Florida	10%
Best Water Ride	1	Dudley Do-Right's Ripsaw Falls	Universal's Islands of Adventure	25%
Best Water Ride	2	Valhalla	Blackpool Pleasure Beach	18%
Best Water Ride	3	Mountain Slidewinder	Dollywood	9%
Best Water Ride	4	Splash Mountain	Magic Kingdom	8%
Best Water Ride	5	Journey to Atlantis	SeaWorld Orlando	8%
Best Waterpark Ride	1	Master Blaster	Schlitterbahn	34%
Best Waterpark Ride	2	Zinga	Holiday World & Splashin' Safari	13%
Best Waterpark Ride	3	Zoombabwe	Holiday World & Splashin' Safari	7%
Best Waterpark Ride	4	Typhoon	Six Flags New England	6%
Best Waterpark Ride	5	Black Anaconda	Noah's Ark	4%
Best Waterpark Ride	5	Summit Plummet	Disney's Blizzard Beach	4%
Best Dark Ride	1	The Amazing Adventures of Spider-Man	Universal's Islands of Adventure	35%
Best Dark Ride	2	Haunted Mansion	Knoebels Amusement Resort	15%
Best Dark Ride	3	Twilight Zone Tower of Terror	Disney-MGM Studios	7%
Best Dark Ride	4	Indiana Jones Adventure: Temple of the Forbidden Eye	Disneyland	6%
Best Dark Ride	5	The Haunted Mansion	Magic Kingdom	5%
Best New Ride of 2006 — Amusement Park	1	The Voyage	Holiday World & Splashin' Safari	50%
Best New Ride of 2006 — Amusement Park	2	Expedition Everest	Disney's Animal Kingdom	16%
Best New Ride of 2006 — Amusement Park	3	El Toro	Six Flags Great Adventure	8%
Best New Ride of 2006 — Amusement Park	4	Goliath	Six Flags Over Georgia	7%
Best New Ride of 2006 — Amusement Park	5	Kentucky Rumbler	Beech Bend Park	4%
Best New Ride of 2006 — Waterpark	1	Bahari River	Holiday World & Splashin' Safari	32%
Best New Ride of 2006 — Waterpark	2	Time Warp	Noah's Ark	15%
Best New Ride of 2006 — Waterpark	2	Tornado	Six Flags Hurricane Harbor Chicago	15%
Best New Ride of 2006 — Waterpark	4	Fire Tower Falls	Dolly's Splash Country	9%
Best Capacity	1	Cedar Point	Sandusky, Ohio	42%
Best Capacity	2	Magic Kingdom	Orlando, Florida	14%
Best Capacity	3	Disneyland	Anaheim, California	9%
Best Capacity	4	Holiday World & Splashin' Safari	Santa Claus, Indiana	4%
Best Capacity	4	Knoebels Amusement Resort	Elysburg, Pennsylvania	4%
Best Theming of an Attraction	1	Dueling Dragons	Universal's Islands of Adventure	22%
Best Theming of an Attraction	2	Expedition Everest	Disney's Animal Kingdom	18%
Best Theming of an Attraction	3	Twilight Zone Tower of Terror	Disney-MGM Studios	11%
Best Theming of an Attraction	4	Indiana Jones Adventure: Temple of the Forbidden Eye	Disneyland	7%
Best Theming of an Attraction	5	Revenge of the Mummy: The Ride	Universal Studios Florida	6%
Best Concert Venue	1	Paramount's Kings Island	Kings Mills, Ohio	13%
Best Concert Venue	2	Six Flags Fiesta Texas	San Antonio, Texas	12%
Best Concert Venue	3	Hersheypark	Hershey, Pennsylvania	11%
Best Concert Venue	4	Six Flags Darien Lake	Darien Center, New York	10%
Best Concert Venue	5	Universal Orlando Resort	Orlando, Florida	6%

Top 50 Steel Roller Coasters
Rank	2006 Recipient	Park	Supplier	Year	Points
1	Superman: Ride of Steel	Six Flags New England	Intamin	2000	1,129
2	Millennium Force	Cedar Point	Intamin	2000	1,052
3	Magnum XL-200	Cedar Point	Arrow Dynamics	1989	663
4	Nitro	Six Flags Great Adventure	B&M	2001	615
5	Apollo's Chariot	Busch Gardens Europe	B&M	1999	610
6	Expedition GeForce	Holiday Park	Intamin	2001	500
7	Phantom's Revenge	Kennywood	Arrow Dynamics (rebuilt Morgan)	1991 (rebuilt 2001)	446
8	Montu	Busch Gardens Africa	B&M	1996	388
9	Goliath	Six Flags Over Georgia	B&M	2006	354
10	Top Thrill Dragster	Cedar Point	Intamin	2003	333
11	Raging Bull	Six Flags Great America	B&M	1999	319
12	Superman: Ride of Steel	Six Flags Darien Lake	Intamin	1999	304
13	SheiKra	Busch Gardens Africa	B&M	2005	237
14	Raptor	Cedar Point	B&M	1994	219
15	Steel Force	Dorney Park & Wildwater Kingdom	Morgan	1997	214
16	Nemesis	Alton Towers	B&M	1994	212
17	Alpengeist	Busch Gardens Europe	B&M	1997	206
18	Dragon Challenge	Universal's Islands of Adventure	B&M	1999	204
19	Mind Bender	Six Flags Over Georgia	Schwarzkopf	1978	182
20	X	Six Flags Magic Mountain	Arrow Dynamics	2002	181
21	The Incredible Hulk Coaster	Universal's Islands of Adventure	B&M	1999	157
21	Kumba	Busch Gardens Africa	B&M	1993	157
23	Superman: Ride of Steel	Six Flags America	Intamin	2000	156
24	Goliath	Six Flags Magic Mountain	Giovanola	2000	155
25	Volcano, The Blast Coaster	Kings Dominion	Intamin	1998	110
26	Mamba	Worlds of Fun	Morgan	1998	102
27	Titan	Six Flags Over Texas	Giovanola	2001	98
28	Kingda Ka	Six Flags Great Adventure	Intamin	2005	88
29	Goliath	Walibi World	Intamin	2001	83
30	Big Bad Wolf	Busch Gardens Europe	Arrow Dynamics	1984	79
31	Expedition Everest	Disney's Animal Kingdom	Vekoma	2006	77
32	Top Gun: The Jet Coaster	Paramount's Carowinds	B&M	1999	74
33	Superman: Krypton Coaster	Six Flags Fiesta Texas	B&M	2000	72
34	Euro-Mir	Europa Park	Mack Rides	1997	71
35	Xcelerator	Knott's Berry Farm	Intamin	2002	68
36	Shock Wave	Six Flags Over Texas	Schwarzkopf	1978	62
37	Goliath	La Ronde	B&M	2006	59
38	The Riddler's Revenge	Six Flags Magic Mountain	B&M	1998	58
39	Storm Runner	Hersheypark	Intamin	2004	57
40	Talon	Dorney Park & Wildwater Kingdom	B&M	2001	56
40	Tatsu	Six Flags Magic Mountain	B&M	2006	56
42	Big One	Blackpool Pleasure Beach	Arrow Dynamics	1994	51
42	Dominator	Geauga Lake	B&M	2000	51
44	Mindbender	Galaxyland	Schwarzkopf	1985	48
45	Desperado	Buffalo Bill's	Arrow Dynamics	1993	47
45	Kraken	SeaWorld Orlando	B&M	2000	47
45	Powder Keg: A Blast into the Wilderness	Silver Dollar City	S&S	2005	47
49	Air	Alton Towers	B&M	2002	43
49	Superman: Ultimate Flight	Six Flags Over Georgia	B&M	2002	43

Top 50 Wooden Roller Coasters
Rank	2006 Recipient	Park	Supplier	Year	Points
1	Thunderhead	Dollywood	GCII	2004	904
2	The Voyage	Holiday World & Splashin' Safari	The Gravity Group	2006	844
3	Boulder Dash	Lake Compounce	CCI	2000	746
3	Hades	Mt. Olympus Water & Theme Park	The Gravity Group	2005	746
5	Phoenix	Knoebels Amusement Resort	PTC	1985	720
6	Shivering Timbers	Michigan's Adventure	CCI	1998	696
7	The Raven	Holiday World & Splashin' Safari	CCI	1995	624
8	The Beast	Paramount's Kings Island		1979	431
9	The Legend	Holiday World & Splashin' Safari	CCI	2000	420
10	Lightning Racer	Hersheypark	GCII	2000	385
11	Avalanche	Timber Falls	S&S	2004	286
12	GhostRider	Knott's Berry Farm	CCI	1998	279
13	El Toro	Six Flags Great Adventure	Intamin	2006	218
14	Texas Giant	Six Flags Over Texas	Dinn	1990	211
15	Rampage	Visionland	CCI	1998	209
16	Cyclone	Astroland	Harry C. Baker	1927	208
17	Tremors	Silverwood Theme Park	CCI	1999	196
18	Cornball Express	Indiana Beach	CCI	2001	167
19	Thunderbolt	Kennywood	John Miller (rebuilt Andy Vettel)	1924 (rebuilt 1968)	163
20	Kentucky Rumbler	Beech Bend Park	GCII	2006	160
20	Ozark Wildcat	Celebration City	GCII	2003	160
22	The Comet	Great Escape	PTC	1994	155
23	Colossos	Heide Park	Intamin	2001	154
24	Megafobia	Oakwood Leisure Park	CCI	1996	153
25	Aska	Nara Dreamland	Intamin	1998	148
26	Grand National	Blackpool Pleasure Beach	Charles Paige	1935	146
27	Balder	Liseberg	Intamin	2003	135
28	Coaster	Playland	Carl Phare/Walker LeRoy	1958	130
29	Twister	Knoebels Amusement Resort		1999	115
30	Tonnerre de Zeus	Parc Astérix	CCI	1997	112
31	Georgia Cyclone	Six Flags Over Georgia	Dinn	1990	108
32	Viper	Six Flags Great America		1995	103
33	The Boss	Six Flags St. Louis	CCI	2000	92
34	Giant Dipper	Santa Cruz Beach Boardwalk	Arthur Looff	1924	86
35	Silver Comet	Martin's Fantasy Island	CCI	1999	77
36	New Mexico Rattler	Cliff's Amusement Park		2002	76
37	Jack Rabbit	Kennywood	Harry C. Baker	1921	70
38	Blue Streak	Cedar Point	PTC	1964	63
39	Roar	Six Flags America	GCII	1998	57
40	Great American Scream Machine	Six Flags Over Georgia	PTC	1973	54
41	Grizzly	Paramount's Kings Dominion	Taft Broadcasting Company	1982	52
41	Timber Terror	Silverwood Theme Park	CCI	1996	52
43	Racer	Kennywood	Charlie Mach	1927	49
43	Wildcat	Hersheypark	GCII	1996	49
45	Hurricane	Boomers! Dania Beach	Dinn	2000	47
46	Gwazi	Busch Gardens Africa	GCII	1999	46
47	Thundercoaster	Tusenfryd	Vekoma	2001	40
48	Son of Beast	Paramount's Kings Island	RCCA	2000	36
49	Timber Wolf	Worlds of Fun	Dinn	1989	35
50	Cyclone	Lakeside Amusement Park	Edward A. Vettel	1940	33

=== 2005 winners ===
2005 Golden Ticket Awards
Host Park: Six Flags Fiesta Texas

Category	Rank	2005 Recipient	Location/Park	Vote
Best Amusement Park	1	Cedar Point	Sandusky, Ohio	37%
Best Amusement Park	2	Universal's Islands of Adventure	Orlando, Florida	14%
Best Amusement Park	3	Blackpool Pleasure Beach	Blackpool England	9%
Best Amusement Park	4	Europa Park	Rust, Germany	7%
Best Amusement Park	4	Knoebels Amusement Resort	Elysburg, Pennsylvania	7%
Best Waterpark	1	Schlitterbahn	New Braunfels, Texas	52%
Best Waterpark	2	Holiday World & Splashin' Safari	Santa Claus, Indiana	17%
Best Waterpark	3	Disney's Blizzard Beach	Orlando, Florida	7%
Best Waterpark	4	Noah's Ark	Wisconsin Dells, Wisconsin	5%
Best Waterpark	5	Disney's Typhoon Lagoon	Orlando, Florida	3%
Best Children's Park	1	Legoland California	Carlsbad, California	44%
Best Children's Park	2	Idlewild	Ligonier, Pennsylvania	12%
Best Children's Park	3	Kiddieland Amusement Park	Melrose Park, Illinois	9%
Best Children's Park	4	Sesame Place	Langhorne, Pennsylvania	8%
Best Children's Park	5	Dutch Wonderland	Lancaster, Pennsylvania	6%
Best Kids' Area	1	Paramount's Kings Island	Kings Mills, Ohio	50%
Best Kids' Area	2	Universal's Islands of Adventure	Orlando, Florida	10%
Best Kids' Area	3	Paramount's Carowinds	Charlotte, North Carolina	8%
Best Kids' Area	4	Paramount's Kings Dominion	Doswell, Virginia	4%
Best Kids' Area	5	Disneyland	Anaheim, California	3%
Best Kids' Area	5	Knott's Berry Farm	Buena Park, California	3%
Friendliest Park	1	Holiday World & Splashin' Safari	Santa Claus, Indiana	47%
Friendliest Park	2	Dollywood	Pigeon Forge, Tennessee	17%
Friendliest Park	3	Cedar Point	Sandusky, Ohio	7%
Friendliest Park	3	Knoebels Amusement Resort	Elysburg, Pennsylvania	7%
Friendliest Park	5	Magic Kingdom	Orlando, Florida	4%
Cleanest Park	1	Holiday World & Splashin' Safari	Santa Claus, Indiana	37%
Cleanest Park	2	Busch Gardens Williamsburg	Williamsburg, Virginia	10%
Cleanest Park	3	Cedar Point	Sandusky, Ohio	9%
Cleanest Park	4	Magic Kingdom	Orlando, Florida	7%
Cleanest Park	5	Disneyland	Anaheim, California	6%
Best Halloween Event	1	Knott's Berry Farm	Buena Park, California	25%
Best Halloween Event	2	Universal Studios Florida	Orlando, Florida	24%
Best Halloween Event	3	Kennywood	West Mifflin, Pennsylvania	10%
Best Halloween Event	4	Knoebels Amusement Resort	Elysburg, Pennsylvania	9%
Best Halloween Event	5	Cedar Point	Sandusky, Ohio	6%
Best Landscaping — Amusement Park	1	Busch Gardens Williamsburg	Williamsburg, Virginia	43%
Best Landscaping — Amusement Park	2	Efteling	Kaatsheuvel, The Netherlands	18%
Best Landscaping — Amusement Park	3	Bonfante Gardens	Gilroy, California	7%
Best Landscaping — Amusement Park	4	Europa Park	Rust, Germany	4%
Best Landscaping — Amusement Park	5	Busch Gardens Tampa Bay	Tampa, Florida	3%
Best Landscaping — Waterpark	1	Schlitterbahn	New Braunfels, Texas	30%
Best Landscaping — Waterpark	2	Disney's Typhoon Lagoon	Orlando, Florida	20%
Best Landscaping — Waterpark	3	Disney's Blizzard Beach	Orlando, Florida	14%
Best Landscaping — Waterpark	4	Holiday World & Splashin' Safari	Santa Claus, Indiana	10%
Best Landscaping — Waterpark	5	Dolly's Splash Country	Pigeon Forge, Tennessee	6%
Best Food	1	Knoebels Amusement Resort	Elysburg, Pennsylvania	26%
Best Food	2	Epcot	Orlando, Florida	13%
Best Food	3	Busch Gardens Williamsburg	Williamsburg, Virginia	12%
Best Food	4	Dollywood	Pigeon Forge, Tennessee	11%
Best Food	5	Silver Dollar City	Branson, Missouri	9%
Best Shows	1	Six Flags Fiesta Texas	San Antonio, Texas	30%
Best Shows	2	Dollywood	Pigeon Forge, Tennessee	19%
Best Shows	3	Busch Gardens Williamsburg	Williamsburg, Virginia	10%
Best Shows	4	Silver Dollar City	Branson, Missouri	6%
Best Shows	5	Cedar Point	Sandusky, Ohio	5%
Best Shows	5	Disney-MGM Studios	Orlando, Florida	5%
Best Outdoor Night Show Production	1	Epcot	Orlando, Florida	27%
Best Outdoor Night Show Production	2	Six Flags Fiesta Texas	San Antonio, Texas	21%
Best Outdoor Night Show Production	3	Disneyland	Anaheim, California	13%
Best Outdoor Night Show Production	4	Disney-MGM Studios	Orlando, Florida	12%
Best Outdoor Night Show Production	5	Cedar Point	Sandusky, Ohio	9%
Best Water Ride	1	Valhalla	Blackpool Pleasure Beach	24%
Best Water Ride	2	Dudley Do-Right's Ripsaw Falls	Universal's Islands of Adventure	20%
Best Water Ride	3	Popeye and Bluto's Bilge-rat Barges	Universal's Islands of Adventure	9%
Best Water Ride	4	Splash Mountain	Magic Kingdom	7%
Best Water Ride	5	Mountain Slidewinder	Dollywood	6%
Best Waterpark Ride	1	Master Blaster	Schlitterbahn	29%
Best Waterpark Ride	2	Zinga	Holiday World & Splashin' Safari	12%
Best Waterpark Ride	3	Zoombabwe	Holiday World & Splashin' Safari	10%
Best Waterpark Ride	4	Summit Plummet	Disney's Blizzard Beach	6%
Best Waterpark Ride	5	Crush 'N Gusher	Disney's Typhoon Lagoon	5%
Best Dark Ride	1	The Amazing Adventures of Spider-Man	Universal's Islands of Adventure	38%
Best Dark Ride	2	Haunted Mansion	Knoebels Amusement Resort	16%
Best Dark Ride	3	Twilight Zone Tower of Terror	Disney-MGM Studios	5%
Best Dark Ride	3	Indiana Jones Adventure: Temple of the Forbidden Eye	Disneyland	5%
Best Dark Ride	5	Droomvlucht	Efteling	4%
Best Dark Ride	5	Pirates of the Caribbean	Disneyland	4%
Best New Ride of 2005 — Amusement Park	1	Hades	Mt. Olympus Water & Theme Park	45%
Best New Ride of 2005 — Amusement Park	2	Kingda Ka	Six Flags Great Adventure	16%
Best New Ride of 2005 — Amusement Park	3	Italian Job: Turbo Coaster	Paramount's Kings Island	8%
Best New Ride of 2005 — Amusement Park	4	maXair	Cedar Point	6%
Best New Ride of 2005 — Amusement Park	4	Powder Keg: A Blast into the Wilderness	Silver Dollar City	6%
Best New Ride of 2005 — Amusement Park	4	SheiKra	Busch Gardens Tampa Bay	6%
Best New Ride of 2005 — Waterpark	1	Black Anaconda	Noah's Ark Water Park	21%
Best New Ride of 2005 — Waterpark	2	Crush 'N Gusher	Disney's Typhoon Lagoon	17%
Best New Ride of 2005 — Waterpark	3	Typhoon	Six Flags New England	14%
Best New Ride of 2005 — Waterpark	4	Bahari	Holiday World & Splashin' Safari	9%
Best New Ride of 2005 — Waterpark	4	Funnel of Fear	Michigan's Adventure	9%
Best Place to Ride Go-Karts	1	Mt. Olympus Water & Theme Park	Wisconsin Dells, Wisconsin	86%
Best Place to Ride Go-Karts	2	NASCAR Speedpark	Pigeon Forge, Tennessee	4%
Best Place to Ride Go-Karts	3	Cedar Point	Sandusky, Ohio	3%
Best Souvenirs	1	Cedar Point	Sandusky, Ohio	19%
Best Souvenirs	2	Knoebels Amusement Resort	Elysburg, Pennsylvania	12%
Best Souvenirs	3	Magic Kingdom	Orlando, Florida	11%
Best Souvenirs	4	Disneyland	Anaheim, California	10%
Best Souvenirs	5	Universal's Islands of Adventure	Orlando, Florida	8%
Best Games Area	1	Cedar Point	Sandusky, Ohio	37%
Best Games Area	2	Paramount's Kings Island	Kings Mills, Ohio	13%
Best Games Area	3	Kennywood	West Mifflin, Pennsylvania	9%
Best Games Area	4	Six Flags Great Adventure	Jackson, New Jersey	7%
Best Games Area	5	Six Flags Great America	Gurnee, Illinois	5%

Top 50 Steel Roller Coasters
Rank	2005 Recipient	Park	Supplier	Year	Points
1	Millennium Force	Cedar Point	Intamin	2000	1,032
2	Superman: Ride of Steel	Six Flags New England	Intamin	2000	923
3	Magnum XL-200	Cedar Point	Arrow Dynamics	1989	569
4	Apollo's Chariot	Busch Gardens Williamsburg	B&M	1999	542
5	Nitro	Six Flags Great Adventure	B&M	2001	508
6	Expedition GeForce	Holiday Park	Intamin	2001	498
7	Top Thrill Dragster	Cedar Point	Intamin	2003	436
8	Phantom's Revenge	Kennywood	Arrow Dynamics (rebuilt Morgan)	1991 (rebuilt 2001)	393
9	Raging Bull	Six Flags Great America	B&M	1999	333
10	Montu	Busch Gardens Tampa Bay	B&M	1996	329
11	Raptor	Cedar Point	B&M	1994	249
12	X	Six Flags Magic Mountain	Arrow Dynamics	2002	235
13	Superman: Ride of Steel	Six Flags Darien Lake	Intamin	1999	228
14	Steel Force	Dorney Park & Wildwater Kingdom	Morgan	1997	227
15	Dueling Dragons	Universal's Islands of Adventure	B&M	1999	219
16	Nemesis	Alton Towers	B&M	1994	218
17	Alpengeist	Busch Gardens Williamsburg	B&M	1997	185
18	Superman: Ride of Steel	Six Flags America	Intamin	2000	183
19	The Incredible Hulk Coaster	Universal's Islands of Adventure	B&M	1999	152
20	Goliath	Six Flags Magic Mountain	Giovanola	2000	148
21	Mind Bender	Six Flags Over Georgia	Schwarzkopf	1978	133
22	Kumba	Busch Gardens Tampa Bay	B&M	1993	127
23	Volcano, The Blast Coaster	Paramount's King's Dominion	Intamin	1998	101
24	Goliath	Six Flags Holland	Intamin	2001	91
25	Mamba	Worlds of Fun	Morgan	1998	81
26	Kraken	SeaWorld Orlando	B&M	2000	80
27	Big Bad Wolf	Busch Gardens Williamsburg	Arrow Dynamics	1984	79
28	SheiKra	Busch Gardens Tampa Bay	B&M	2005	77
29	Big One	Blackpool Pleasure Beach	Arrow Dynamics	1994	75
29	Top Gun: The Jet Coaster	Paramount's Carowinds	B&M	1999	75
31	Kingda Ka	Six Flags Great Adventure	Intamin	2005	72
32	Euro-Mir	Europa Park	Mack Rides	1997	70
33	Superman: Krypton Coaster	Six Flags Fiesta Texas	B&M	2000	69
34	Storm Runner	Hersheypark	Intamin	2004	65
34	Titan	Six Flags Over Texas	Giovanola	2001	65
36	Air	Alton Towers	B&M	2002	64
37	Shock Wave	Six Flags Over Texas	Schwarzkopf	1978	55
38	Xcelerator	Knott's Berry Farm	Intamin	2002	50
39	Lisebergbanan	Liseberg	Schwarzkopf	1987	47
40	Mindbender	Galaxyland	Schwarzkopf	1985	44
40	Powder Keg: A Blast into the Wilderness	Silver Dollar City	S&S	2005	44
42	Desperado	Buffalo Bill's	Arrow Dynamics	1993	43
43	Medusa	Six Flags Great Adventure	B&M	1999	42
44	Dominator	Geauga Lake	B&M	2000	41
45	Batman: The Ride	Six Flags Great America	B&M	1992	38
45	Colossus	Thorpe Park	Intamin	2002	38
45	The Riddler's Revenge	Six Flags Magic Mountain	B&M	1998	38
45	Superman: Ultimate Flight	Six Flags Over Georgia	B&M	2002	38
49	Wildfire	Silver Dollar City	B&M	2001	36
50	Whizzer	Six Flags Great America	Schwarzkopf	1976	35

Top 50 Wooden Roller Coasters
Rank	2005 Recipient	Park	Supplier	Year	Points
1	Thunderhead	Dollywood	GCII	2004	838
2	Boulder Dash	Lake Compounce	CCI	2000	690
3	Shivering Timbers	Michigan's Adventure	CCI	1998	671
4	Phoenix	Knoebels Amusement Resort	PTC	1985	662
5	The Raven	Holiday World & Splashin' Safari	CCI	1995	616
6	Hades	Mt. Olympus Water & Theme Park	The Gravity Group	2005	579
7	The Legend	Holiday World & Splashin' Safari	CCI	2000	537
8	The Beast	Paramount's Kings Island		1979	436
9	Lightning Racer	Hersheypark	GCII	2000	355
10	GhostRider	Knott's Berry Farm	CCI	1998	301
11	Avalanche	Timber Falls	S&S	2004	263
12	Texas Giant	Six Flags Over Texas	Dinn	1990	238
13	Megafobia	Oakwood Leisure Park	CCI	1996	236
14	Cyclone	Astroland	Harry C. Baker	1927	220
15	Tremors	Silverwood Theme Park	CCI	1999	218
16	Ozark Wildcat	Celebration City	GCII	2003	212
17	Rampage	Visionland	CCI	1998	199
18	Cornball Express	Indiana Beach	CCI	2001	195
19	Colossos	Heide Park	Intamin	2001	193
20	The Comet	Great Escape	PTC	1994	163
21	Balder	Liseberg	Intamin	2003	153
22	Georgia Cyclone	Six Flags Over Georgia	Dinn	1990	149
22	Grand National	Blackpool Pleasure Beach	Charles Paige	1935	149
22	Thunderbolt	Kennywood	John Miller (rebuilt Andy Vettel)	1924 (rebuilt 1968)	149
25	Twister	Knoebels Amusement Resort		1999	113
26	Viper	Six Flags Great America		1995	112
27	Tonnerre de Zeus	Parc Astérix	CCI	1997	104
28	Jack Rabbit	Kennywood	Harry C. Baker	1921	102
29	Coaster	Playland	Carl Phare/Walker LeRoy	1958	93
30	New Mexico Rattler	Cliff's Amusement Park		2002	87
31	Son of Beast	Paramount's Kings Island	RCCA	2000	80
32	Wildcat	Hersheypark	GCII	1996	70
33	Giant Dipper	Santa Cruz Beach Boardwalk	Arthur Looff	1924	68
33	Mean Streak	Cedar Point	Dinn	1991	68
33	Timber Terror	Silverwood Theme Park	CCI	1996	68
36	The Boss	Six Flags St. Louis	CCI	2000	63
37	Grizzly	Paramount's Kings Dominion	Taft Broadcasting Company	1982	68
38	Blue Streak	Cedar Point	PTC	1964	53
39	Villain	Geauga Lake	CCI	2000	51
40	Racer	Kennywood	Charlie Mach	1927	47
41	Big Dipper	Geauga Lake	John Miller	1925	42
42	Texas Cyclone	Six Flags AstroWorld	Frontier Construction	1976	41
43	Cyclone	Six Flags New England	Frontier Construction	1983	37
43	Gwazi	Busch Gardens Tampa Bay	GCII	1999	37
45	Timber Wolf	Worlds of Fun	Dinn	1989	36
46	The Racer	Paramount's Kings Island	PTC	1972	33
46	Thundercoaster	Tusenfryd	Vekoma	2001	33
48	Hurricane	Boomers! Dania Beach	Dinn	2000	32
49	Roar	Six Flags America	GCII	1998	31
50	Excalibur	Funtown Splashtown USA	CCI	1998	27

=== 2004 winners ===
2004 Golden Ticket Awards
Host Park: Cedar Point

Category	Rank	2004 Recipient	Location/Park	Vote
Best Amusement Park	1	Cedar Point	Sandusky, Ohio	35%
Best Amusement Park	2	Universal's Islands of Adventure	Orlando, Florida	15%
Best Amusement Park	3	Blackpool Pleasure Beach	Blackpool, England	7%
Best Amusement Park	4	Knoebels Amusement Resort	Elysburg, Pennsylvania	7%
Best Amusement Park	5	Kennywood	West Mifflin, Pennsylvania	6%
Best Waterpark	1	Schlitterbahn	New Braunfels, Texas	56%
Best Waterpark	2	Holiday World & Splashin' Safari	Santa Claus, Indiana	18%
Best Waterpark	3	Disney's Blizzard Beach	Orlando, Florida	6%
Best Waterpark	4	Disney's Typhoon Lagoon	Orlando, Florida	4%
Best Waterpark	5	Boomerang Bay	Kings Mills, Ohio	3%
Best Children's Park	1	Legoland California	Carlsbad, California	41%
Best Children's Park	2	Idlewild	Ligonier, Pennsylvania	13%
Best Children's Park	3	Memphis Kiddie Park	Cleveland, Ohio	10%
Best Children's Park	4	Sesame Place	Langhorne, Pennsylvania	7%
Best Children's Park	5	Dutch Wonderland	Lancaster, Pennsylvania	4%
Best Kids' Area	1	Paramount's Kings Island	Kings Mills, Ohio	50%
Best Kids' Area	2	Universal's Islands of Adventure	Orlando, Florida	10%
Best Kids' Area	3	Paramount's Kings Dominion	Doswell, Virginia	7%
Best Kids' Area	4	Cedar Point	Sandusky, Ohio	6%
Best Kids' Area	5	Knott's Berry Farm	Buena Park, California	5%
Friendliest Park	1	Holiday World & Splashin' Safari	Santa Claus, Indiana	43%
Friendliest Park	2	Dollywood	Pigeon Forge, Tennessee	11%
Friendliest Park	3	Knoebels Amusement Resort	Elysburg, Pennsylvania	8%
Friendliest Park	4	Cedar Point	Sandusky, Ohio	6%
Friendliest Park	5	Silver Dollar City	Branson, Missouri	5%
Cleanest Park	1	Holiday World & Splashin' Safari	Santa Claus, Indiana	36%
Cleanest Park	2	Magic Kingdom	Orlando, Florida	11%
Cleanest Park	3	Busch Gardens Williamsburg	Williamsburg, Virginia	10%
Cleanest Park	4	Cedar Point	Sandusky, Ohio	8%
Cleanest Park	5	Disneyland	Anaheim, California	7%
Best Landscaping	1	Busch Gardens Williamsburg	Williamsburg, Virginia	44%
Best Landscaping	2	Efteling	Kaatsheuvel, The Netherlands	19%
Best Landscaping	3	Bonfante Gardens	Gilroy, California	9%
Best Landscaping	4	Magic Kingdom	Orlando, Florida	4%
Best Landscaping	5	Epcot	Orlando, Florida	3%
Most Beautiful Park	1	Busch Gardens Williamsburg	Williamsburg, Virginia	36%
Most Beautiful Park	2	Efteling	Kaatsheuvel, The Netherlands	23%
Most Beautiful Park	3	Europa Park	Rust, Germany	9%
Most Beautiful Park	4	Universal's Islands of Adventure	Orlando, Florida	7%
Most Beautiful Park	5	Epcot	Orlando, Florida	4%
Most Beautiful Waterpark	1	Schlitterbahn	New Braunfels, Texas	31%
Most Beautiful Waterpark	2	Disney's Blizzard Beach	Orlando, Florida	25%
Most Beautiful Waterpark	3	Disney's Typhoon Lagoon	Orlando, Florida	14%
Most Beautiful Waterpark	4	Holiday World & Splashin' Safari	Santa Claus, Indiana	7%
Most Beautiful Waterpark	5	Hyland Hills Water World	Denver, Colorado	5%
Best Food	1	Knoebels Amusement Resort	Elysburg, Pennsylvania	28%
Best Food	2	Silver Dollar City	Branson, Missouri	13%
Best Food	3	Busch Gardens Williamsburg	Williamsburg, Virginia	10%
Best Food	3	Kennywood	West Mifflin, Pennsylvania	10%
Best Food	5	Epcot	Orlando, Florida	9%
Best Shows	1	Six Flags Fiesta Texas	San Antonio, Texas	34%
Best Shows	2	Dollywood	Pigeon Forge, Tennessee	14%
Best Shows	3	Busch Gardens Williamsburg	Williamsburg, Virginia	12%
Best Shows	4	Silver Dollar City	Branson, Missouri	8%
Best Shows	5	Cedar Point	Sandusky, Ohio	5%
Best Outdoor Night Show	1	Six Flags Fiesta Texas	San Antonio, Texas	22%
Best Outdoor Night Show	2	Epcot	Orlando, Florida	21%
Best Outdoor Night Show	3	Disney-MGM Studios	Orlando, Florida	13%
Best Outdoor Night Show	4	Disneyland	Anaheim, California	12%
Best Outdoor Night Show	5	Cedar Point	Sandusky, Ohio	10%
Best Water Ride	1	Dudley Do-Right's Ripsaw Falls	Universal's Islands of Adventure	23%
Best Water Ride	2	Valhalla	Blackpool Pleasure Beach	21%
Best Water Ride	3	Popeye and Bluto's Bilge-rat Barges	Universal's Islands of Adventure	9%
Best Water Ride	4	Splash Mountain	Magic Kingdom	7%
Best Water Ride	5	Journey to Atlantis	SeaWorld Orlando	6%
Best Waterpark Ride	1	Master Blaster	Schlitterbahn	37%
Best Waterpark Ride	2	Zinga	Holiday World & Splashin' Safari	14%
Best Waterpark Ride	3	Zoombabwe	Holiday World & Splashin' Safari	10%
Best Waterpark Ride	4	Tasmanian Typhoon	Boomerang Bay	4%
Best Waterpark Ride	5	Voyage to the Center of the Earth	Hyland Hills Water World	3%
Best Waterpark Ride	5	Whitewater Tube Chute	Schlitterbahn	3%
Best Dark Ride	1	The Amazing Adventures of Spider-Man	Universal's Islands of Adventure	37%
Best Dark Ride	2	Haunted Mansion	Knoebels Amusement Resort	22%
Best Dark Ride	3	Twilight Zone Tower of Terror	Disney-MGM Studios	6%
Best Dark Ride	4	Droomvlucht	Efteling	4%
Best Dark Ride	4	Indiana Jones Adventure: Temple of the Forbidden Eye	Disneyland	4%

Top 50 Steel Roller Coasters
Rank	2004 Recipient	Park	Supplier	Year	Points
1	Millennium Force	Cedar Point	Intamin	2000	1,181
2	Superman: Ride of Steel	Six Flags New England	Intamin	2000	1,167
3	Magnum XL-200	Cedar Point	Arrow Dynamics	1989	767
4	Expedition GeForce	Holiday Park	Intamin	2001	694
5	Apollo's Chariot	Busch Gardens Williamsburg	B&M	1999	636
6	Nitro	Six Flags Great Adventure	B&M	2001	554
7	Top Thrill Dragster	Cedar Point	Intamin	2003	433
8	Phantom's Revenge	Kennywood	Arrow Dynamics (rebuilt Morgan)	1991 (rebuilt 2001)	421
9	Montu	Busch Gardens Tampa Bay	B&M	1996	347
10	Raptor	Cedar Point	B&M	1994	314
11	Steel Force	Dorney Park & Wildwater Kingdom	Morgan	1997	282
12	Superman: Ride of Steel	Six Flags America	Intamin	2000	266
13	Superman: Ride of Steel	Six Flags Darien Lake	Intamin	1999	260
14	Raging Bull	Six Flags Great America	B&M	1999	248
15	X	Six Flags Magic Mountain	Arrow Dynamics	2002	245
16	Dueling Dragons	Universal's Islands of Adventure	B&M	1999	244
17	Nemesis	Alton Towers	B&M	1994	242
18	Goliath	Six Flags Magic Mountain	Giovanola	2000	233
19	Alpengeist	Busch Gardens Williamsburg	B&M	1997	232
20	The Incredible Hulk Coaster	Universal's Islands of Adventure	B&M	1999	203
21	Mind Bender	Six Flags Over Georgia	Schwarzkopf	1978	181
22	Kumba	Busch Gardens Tampa Bay	B&M	1993	152
23	Volcano, The Blast Coaster	Paramount's King's Dominion	Intamin	1998	135
24	Goliath	Six Flags Holland	Intamin	2001	130
25	Titan	Six Flags Over Texas	Giovanola	2001	124
26	Shock Wave	Six Flags Over Texas	Schwarzkopf	1978	94
27	Superman: Krypton Coaster	Six Flags Fiesta Texas	B&M	2000	93
28	Mamba	Worlds of Fun	Morgan	1998	90
29	Kraken	SeaWorld Orlando	B&M	2000	88
30	Big One	Blackpool Pleasure Beach	Arrow Dynamics	1994	86
31	Euro-Mir	Europa Park	Mack Rides	1997	84
32	Air	Alton Towers	B&M	2002	81
33	Storm Runner	Hersheypark	Intamin	2004	79
34	Medusa	Six Flags Great Adventure	B&M	1999	66
35	Superman: Ultimate Flight	Six Flags Over Georgia	B&M	2002	65
36	Xcelerator	Knott's Berry Farm	Intamin	2002	64
37	Dominator	Geauga Lake	B&M	2000	63
38	Desperado	Buffalo Bill's	Arrow Dynamics	1993	60
39	Big Bad Wolf	Busch Gardens Williamsburg	Arrow Dynamics	1984	55
40	Top Gun: The Jet Coaster	Paramount's Carowinds	B&M	1999	50
41	California Screamin'	Disney's California Adventure	Intamin	2001	48
42	Talon	Dorney Park & Wildwater Kingdom	B&M	2001	47
43	Superman: The Escape	Six Flags Magic Mountain	Intamin	1997	46
44	The Riddler's Revenge	Six Flags Magic Mountain	B&M	1998	45
45	Mindbender	Galaxyland	Schwarzkopf	1985	43
46	Wildfire	Silver Dollar City	B&M	2001	38
47	Lisebergbanan	Liseberg	Schwarzkopf	1987	31
48	Colossus	Thorpe Park	Intamin	2002	30
49	Magnum Force	Flamingoland	Schwarzkopf	2000	28
49	Rock 'n' Roller Coaster Starring Aerosmith	Disney-MGM Studios	Vekoma	1999	28

Top 50 Wooden Roller Coasters
Rank	2004 Recipient	Park	Supplier	Year	Points
1	Boulder Dash	Lake Compounce	CCI	2000	972
2	Shivering Timbers	Michigan's Adventure	CCI	1998	854
3	The Raven	Holiday World & Splashin' Safari	CCI	1995	843
4	Phoenix	Knoebels Amusement Resort	PTC	1985	745
5	The Legend	Holiday World & Splashin' Safari	CCI	2000	634
6	Thunderhead	Dollywood	GCII	2004	530
7	The Beast	Paramount's Kings Island		1979	448
8	GhostRider	Knott's Berry Farm	CCI	1998	434
9	Texas Giant	Six Flags Over Texas	Dinn	1990	395
10	Lightning Racer	Hersheypark	GCII	2000	376
11	Tremors	Silverwood Theme Park	CCI	1999	290
12	The Comet	Great Escape	PTC	1994	289
13	Rampage	Visionland	CCI	1998	279
14	Megafobia	Oakwood Leisure Park	CCI	1996	251
15	Colossos	Heide Park	Intamin	2001	246
16	Cyclone	Astroland	Harry C. Baker	1927	231
17	Cornball Express	Indiana Beach	CCI	2001	230
18	Thunderbolt	Kennywood	John Miller (rebuilt Andy Vettel)	1924 (rebuilt 1968)	221
19	Grand National	Blackpool Pleasure Beach	Charles Paige	1935	207
20	Georgia Cyclone	Six Flags Over Georgia	Dinn	1990	199
21	Ozark Wildcat	Celebration City	GCII	2003	162
22	The Boss	Six Flags St. Louis	CCI	2000	160
23	Balder	Liseberg	Intamin	2003	159
24	New Mexico Rattler	Cliff's Amusement Park		2002	142
25	Twister	Knoebels Amusement Resort		1999	125
26	Tonnerre de Zeus	Parc Astérix	CCI	1997	124
27	Texas Cyclone	Six Flags AstroWorld	Frontier Construction	1976	119
28	Wildcat	Hersheypark	GCII	1996	117
29	Viper	Six Flags Great America		1995	115
30	Timber Terror	Silverwood Theme Park	CCI	1996	111
31	Coaster	Playland	Carl Phare/Walker LeRoy	1958	98
32	Giant Dipper	Santa Cruz Beach Boardwalk	Arthur Looff	1924	92
33	Villain	Geauga Lake	CCI	2000	88
34	Jack Rabbit	Kennywood	Harry C. Baker	1921	87
35	Timber Wolf	Worlds of Fun	Dinn	1989	86
36	Grizzly	Paramount's Kings Dominion	Taft Broadcasting Company	1982	71
36	Son of Beast	Paramount's Kings Island	RCCA	2000	71
38	Gwazi	Busch Gardens Tampa Bay	GCII	1999	70
39	Racer	Kennywood	Charlie Mach	1927	67
40	Excalibur	Funtown Splashtown USA	CCI	1998	62
41	Great America Scream Machine	Six Flags Over Georgia	PTC	1973	59
42	Blue Streak	Cedar Point	PTC	1964	57
43	Cyclone	Six Flags New England	Frontier Construction	1983	56
44	Screechin' Eagle	LeSourdsville Lake	John Miller	1938	54
45	Mega Zeph	Six Flags New Orleans	CCI	2000	47
46	Big Dipper	Geauga Lake	John Miller	1925	45
46	Roar	Six Flags Marine World	GCII	1999	45
48	Roar	Six Flags America	GCII	1998	40
49	Thunder Run	Six Flags Kentucky Kingdom	Dinn	1990	36
50	Hurricane	Boomers! Dania Beach	Dinn	2000	33

=== 2003 winners ===
2003 Golden Ticket Awards
Host Park: Schlitterbahn

Category	Rank	2003 Recipient	Location/Park	Vote
Best Amusement Park	1	Cedar Point	Sandusky, Ohio	30%
Best Amusement Park	2	Universal's Islands of Adventure	Orlando, Florida	15%
Best Amusement Park	3	Blackpool Pleasure Beach	Blackpool, England	12%
Best Waterpark	1	Schlitterbahn	New Braunfels, Texas	47%
Best Waterpark	2	Holiday World & Splashin' Safari	Santa Claus, Indiana	23%
Best Waterpark	3	Dorney Park & Wildwater Kingdom	Allentown, Pennsylvania	6%
Best Kids' Area	1	Paramount's Kings Island	Kings Mills, Ohio	47%
Best Kids' Area	2	Universal's Islands of Adventure	Orlando, Florida	8%
Best Kids' Area	3	Paramount's Kings Dominion	Doswell, Virginia	7%
Friendliest Park	1	Holiday World & Splashin' Safari	Santa Claus, Indiana	61%
Friendliest Park	2	Knoebels Amusement Resort	Elysburg, Pennsylvania	10%
Friendliest Park	3	Paramount's Kings Dominion	Doswell, Virginia	3%
Cleanest Park	1	Holiday World & Splashin' Safari	Santa Claus, Indiana	45%
Cleanest Park	2	Disneyland	Anaheim, California	10%
Cleanest Park	3	Busch Gardens Williamsburg	Williamsburg, Virginia	7%
Best Landscaping	1	Busch Gardens Williamsburg	Williamsburg, Virginia	37%
Best Landscaping	2	Efteling	Kaatsheuvel, The Netherlands	23%
Best Landscaping	3	Bonfante Gardens	Gilroy, California	7%
Best Landscaping	3	Alton Towers	Staffordshire, England	7%
Most Beautiful Park	1	Busch Gardens Williamsburg	Williamsburg, Virginia	38%
Most Beautiful Park	2	Efteling	Kaatsheuvel, The Netherlands	22%
Most Beautiful Park	3	Europa Park	Rust, Germany	8%
Most Beautiful Waterpark	1	Schlitterbahn	New Braunfels, Texas	24%
Most Beautiful Waterpark	2	Typhoon Lagoon	Orlando, Florida	18%
Most Beautiful Waterpark	3	Blizzard Beach	Orlando, Florida	17%
Best Food	1	Knoebels Amusement Resort	Elysburg, Pennsylvania	30%
Best Food	2	Silver Dollar City	Branson, Missouri	13%
Best Food	3	Busch Gardens Williamsburg	Williamsburg, Virginia	10%
Best Shows	1	Six Flags Fiesta Texas	San Antonio, Texas	32%
Best Shows	2	Busch Gardens Williamsburg	Williamsburg, Virginia	13%
Best Shows	3	Dollywood	Pigeon Forge, Tennessee	8%
Best Shows	3	Silver Dollar City	Branson, Missouri	8%
Best Water Ride	1	Valhalla	Blackpool Pleasure Beach	23%
Best Water Ride	2	Dudley Do-Right's Ripsaw Falls	Universal's Islands of Adventure	14%
Best Water Ride	3	Popeye and Bluto's Bilge-rat Barges	Universal's Islands of Adventure	6%
Best Waterpark Ride	1	Zinga	Holiday World & Splashin' Safari	27%
Best Waterpark Ride	2	Master Blaster	Schlitterbahn	26%
Best Waterpark Ride	3	Zoombabwe	Holiday World & Splashin' Safari	16%
Best Dark Ride	1	The Amazing Adventures of Spider-Man	Universal's Islands of Adventure	34%
Best Dark Ride	2	Haunted Mansion	Knoebels Amusement Resort	20%
Best Dark Ride	3	Dreamflight (Droomvlucht)	Efteling	8%
Best Park Capacity	1	Cedar Point	Sandusky, Ohio	53%
Best Park Capacity	2	Disneyland	Anaheim, California	8%
Best Park Capacity	3	Magic Kingdom	Orlando, Florida	6%
Best Non-Coaster Ride	1	Giant Drops	Multiple locations	20%
Best Non-Coaster Ride	2	The Amazing Adventures of Spider-Man	Universal's Islands of Adventure	14%
Best Non-Coaster Ride	3	The Twilight Zone Tower of Terror	Disney-MGM Studios	8%
Best Theming of an Attraction	1	Dueling Dragons	Universal's Islands of Adventure	27%
Best Theming of an Attraction	2	Indiana Jones Adventure: Temple of the Forbidden Eye	Disneyland	14%
Best Theming of an Attraction	3	The Twilight Zone Tower of Terror	Disney-MGM Studios	10%

Top 50 Steel Roller Coasters
Rank	2003 Recipient	Park	Supplier	Year	Points
1	Superman: Ride of Steel	Six Flags New England	Intamin	2000	1,177
2	Millennium Force	Cedar Point	Intamin	2000	1,093
3	Expedition GeForce	Holiday Park	Intamin	2001	794
4	Magnum XL-200	Cedar Point	Arrow Dynamics	1989	789
5	Apollo's Chariot	Busch Gardens Williamsburg	B&M	1999	538
6	Nitro	Six Flags Great Adventure	B&M	2001	527
7	Nemesis	Alton Towers	B&M	1994	361
8	Phantom's Revenge	Kennywood	Arrow Dynamics (rebuilt Morgan)	1991 (rebuilt 2001)	353
9	Superman: Ride of Steel	Six Flags Darien Lake	Intamin	1999	320
10	Raptor	Cedar Point	B&M	1994	315
11	Top Thrill Dragster	Cedar Point	Intamin	2003	298
12	Montu	Busch Gardens Tampa Bay	B&M	1996	278
13	Superman: Ride of Steel	Six Flags America	Intamin	2000	272
14	Dueling Dragons	Universal's Islands of Adventure	B&M	1999	257
15	X	Six Flags Magic Mountain	Arrow Dynamics	2002	243
16	Steel Force	Dorney Park & Wildwater Kingdom	Morgan	1997	242
17	Raging Bull	Six Flags Great America	B&M	1999	239
18	Goliath	Six Flags Magic Mountain	Giovanola	2000	184
19	Goliath	Six Flags Holland	Intamin	2001	183
19	Alpengeist	Busch Gardens Williamsburg	B&M	1997	183
21	The Incredible Hulk Coaster	Universal's Islands of Adventure	B&M	1999	179
22	Kumba	Busch Gardens Tampa Bay	B&M	1993	148
23	Euro-Mir	Europa Park	Mack Rides	1997	147
24	Air	Alton Towers	B&M	2002	140
25	Superman: Krypton Coaster	Six Flags Fiesta Texas	B&M	2000	138
26	Mind Bender	Six Flags Over Georgia	Schwarzkopf	1978	137
27	Titan	Six Flags Over Texas	Giovanola	2001	131
28	Volcano, The Blast Coaster	Paramount's King's Dominion	Intamin	1998	122
29	Big One	Blackpool Pleasure Beach	Arrow Dynamics	1994	111
30	Mr. Freeze	Six Flags Over Texas	Premier Rides	1998	97
31	Mamba	Worlds of Fun	Morgan	1998	95
32	Colossus	Thorpe Park	Intamin	2002	90
33	Hypersonic XLC	Paramount's King's Dominion	S&S	2001	87
34	Shock Wave	Six Flags Over Texas	Schwarzkopf	1978	80
35	Xcelerator	Knott's Berry Farm	Intamin	2002	79
36	Medusa	Six Flags Great Adventure	B&M	1999	68
37	Mindbender	Galaxyland	Schwarzkopf	1985	67
38	Superman: Ultimate Flight	Six Flags Over Georgia	B&M	2002	64
39	Top Gun: The Jet Coaster	Paramount's Carowinds	B&M	1999	60
40	Wildfire	Silver Dollar City	B&M	2001	59
41	The Riddler's Revenge	Six Flags Magic Mountain	B&M	1998	56
42	Big Bad Wolf	Busch Gardens Williamsburg	Arrow Dynamics	1984	47
43	California Screamin'	Disney's California Adventure	Intamin	2001	43
44	Magnum Force	Flamingo Land Resort	Schwarzkopf	2000	39
45	Superman: The Escape	Six Flags Magic Mountain	Intamin	1997	37
45	Top Gun	Paramount's Great America	B&M	1993	37
47	Superman: Ultimate Escape	Six Flags Worlds of Adventure	Intamin	2000	35
48	Kraken	SeaWorld Orlando	B&M	2000	31
49	Desperado	Buffalo Bill's	Arrow Dynamics	1993	30
50	Wicked Twister	Cedar Point	Intamin	2002	28

Top 30 Wooden Roller Coasters
Rank	2003 Recipient	Park	Supplier	Year	Points
1	The Raven	Holiday World & Splashin' Safari	CCI	1995	1194
2	Shivering Timbers	Michigan's Adventure	CCI	1998	912
3	Boulder Dash	Lake Compounce	CCI	2000	892
4	Phoenix	Knoebels Amusement Resort	PTC	1985	823
5	The Legend	Holiday World & Splashin' Safari	CCI	2000	724
6	GhostRider	Knott's Berry Farm	CCI	1998	437
7	Lightning Racer	Hersheypark	GCII	2000	427
8	The Beast	Paramount's Kings Island		1979	422
9	Megafobia	Oakwood Leisure Park	CCI	1996	421
10	Texas Giant	Six Flags Over Texas	Dinn	1990	415
11	Colossos	Heide Park	Intamin	2001	335
12	Grand National	Blackpool Pleasure Beach	Charles Paige	1935	314
13	Cornball Express	Indiana Beach	CCI	2001	304
14	The Comet	Great Escape	PTC	1994	284
15	Rampage	Visionland	CCI	1998	279
16	Cyclone	Astroland	Harry C. Baker	1927	269
17	The Boss	Six Flags St. Louis	CCI	2000	237
18	Georgia Cyclone	Six Flags Over Georgia	Dinn	1990	225
19	Thunderbolt	Kennywood	John Miller (rebuilt Andy Vettel)	1924 (rebuilt 1968)	194
20	Tonnerre de Zeus	Parc Astérix	CCI	1997	180
21	Twister	Knoebels Amusement Resort		1999	177
22	Tremors	Silverwood Theme Park	CCI	1999	168
23	Viper	Six Flags Great America		1995	139
24	Coaster	Playland	Carl Phare/Walker LeRoy	1958	130
25	Texas Cyclone	Six Flags AstroWorld	Frontier Construction	1976	129
26	Ozark Wildcat	Celebration City	GCII	2003	121
27	Villain	Six Flags Worlds of Adventure	CCI	2000	112
28	Wildcat	Hersheypark	GCII	1996	104
29	Giant Dipper	Santa Cruz Beach Boardwalk	Arthur Looff	1924	97
30	Timber Wolf	Worlds of Fun	Dinn	1989	89
31	Timber Terror	Silverwood Theme Park	CCI	1996	78
32	Grizzly	Paramount's Kings Dominion	Taft Broadcasting Company	1982	76
33	Cyclone	Six Flags New England	Frontier Construction	1983	69
34	Excalibur	Funtown Splashtown USA	CCI	1998	60
35	Thunder Run	Six Flags Kentucky Kingdom	Dinn	1990	54
35	Blue Streak	Cedar Point	PTC	1964	54
37	Son of Beast	Paramount's Kings Island	RCCA	2000	49
37	Wild Mouse	Blackpool Pleasure Beach		1958	49
39	Roar	Six Flags America	GCII	1998	48
40	Screechin' Eagle	LeSourdsville Lake	John Miller	1938	45
40	Werewolf	Six Flags Belgium	Vekoma	2001	45
42	Jack Rabbit	Kennywood	Harry C. Baker	1921	44
43	Thundercoaster	Tusenfryd	Vekoma	2001	42
44	Gwazi	Busch Gardens Tampa Bay	GCII	1999	41
44	Racer	Kennywood	Charlie Mach	1927	41
44	Roar	Six Flags Marine World	GCII	1999	41
47	Cyclops	Big Chief's Cart & Coaster World	CCI	1995	37
47	Hurricane	Boomers! Dania Beach	Dinn	2000	37
49	Mean Streak	Cedar Point	Dinn	1991	36
50	Mega Zeph	Six Flags New Orleans	CCI	2000	35

=== 2002 winners ===
2002 Golden Ticket Awards
Host Park: Paramount's Kings Island

Category	Rank	2002 Recipient	Location/Park	Vote
Best Amusement Park	1	Cedar Point	Sandusky, Ohio	28%
Best Amusement Park	2	Universal's Islands of Adventure	Orlando, Florida	18%
Best Amusement Park	3	Knoebels Amusement Resort	Elysburg, Pennsylvania	9%
Best Waterpark	1	Schlitterbahn	New Braunfels, Texas	48%
Best Waterpark	2	Holiday World & Splashin' Safari	Santa Claus, Indiana	17%
Best Waterpark	3	Disney's Blizzard Beach	Orlando, Florida	9%
Best Kids' Area	1	Paramount's Kings Island	Kings Mills, Ohio	38%
Best Kids' Area	2	Legoland California	Carlsbad, California	6%
Best Kids' Area	3	Idlewild	Ligonier, Pennsylvania	5%
Friendliest Park	1	Holiday World & Splashin' Safari	Santa Claus, Indiana	60%
Friendliest Park	2	Knoebels Amusement Resort	Elysburg, Pennsylvania	8%
Friendliest Park	3	Cedar Point	Sandusky, Ohio	6%
Cleanest Park	1	Holiday World & Splashin' Safari	Santa Claus, Indiana	40%
Cleanest Park	2	Disneyland	Anaheim, California	9%
Cleanest Park	3	Busch Gardens Williamsburg	Williamsburg, Virginia	8%
Best Landscaping	1	Busch Gardens Williamsburg	Williamsburg, Virginia	37%
Best Landscaping	2	Efteling	Kaatsheuvel, The Netherlands	17%
Best Landscaping	3	Bonfante Gardens	Gilroy, California	6%
Best Food	1	Knoebels Amusement Resort	Elysburg, Pennsylvania	28%
Best Food	2	Silver Dollar City	Branson, Missouri	11%
Best Food	3	Busch Gardens Williamsburg	Williamsburg, Virginia	10%
Best Shows	1	Six Flags Fiesta Texas	San Antonio, Texas	29%
Best Shows	2	Busch Gardens Williamsburg	Williamsburg, Virginia	11%
Best Shows	3	Silver Dollar City	Branson, Missouri	
Best Water Ride	1	Dudley Do-Right's Ripsaw Falls	Universal's Islands of Adventure	16%
Best Water Ride	2	Valhalla	Blackpool Pleasure Beach	15%
Best Water Ride	3	Popeye & Bluto's Bilge-rat Barges	Universal's Islands of Adventure	6%
Best Waterpark Ride	1	Master Blaster	Schlitterbahn	34%
Best Waterpark Ride	2	Zoombabwe	Holiday World & Splashin' Safari	32%
Best Waterpark Ride	3	Summit Plummit	Disney's Blizzard Beach	7%
Best Dark Ride	1	The Amazing Adventures of Spider-Man	Universal's Islands of Adventure	31%
Best Dark Ride	2	Haunted Mansion	Knoebels Amusement Resort	13%
Best Dark Ride	3	The Haunted Mansion	Disneyland	9%
Best Park Capacity	1	Cedar Point	Sandusky, Ohio	45%
Best Park Capacity	2	Disneyland	Anaheim, California	10%
Best Park Capacity	3	Europa Park	Rust, Germany	9%
Best Souvenirs	1	Knoebels Amusement Resort	Elysburg, Pennsylvania	16%
Best Souvenirs	2	Cedar Point	Sandusky, Ohio	13%
Best Souvenirs	3	Universal's Islands of Adventure	Orlando, Florida	8%
Best Games Area	1	Cedar Point	Sandusky, Ohio	19%
Best Games Area	2	Paramount's Kings Island	Kings Mills, Ohio	11%
Best Games Area	3	Disney's California Adventure	Anaheim, California	8%
Best Themed or Background Music	1	Universal's Islands of Adventure	Orlando, Florida	38%
Best Themed or Background Music	2	Disney's California Adventure	Anaheim, California	10%
Best Themed or Background Music	3	Efteling	Kaatsheuvel, The Netherlands	7%
Most Classic or Distinctive Coaster Station	1	Cyclone	Lakeside Amusement Park	22%
Most Classic or Distinctive Coaster Station	2	Racer	Kennywood	12%
Most Classic or Distinctive Coaster Station	3	Dueling Dragons	Universal's Islands of Adventure	11%

Top 25 Steel Roller Coasters
Rank	2002 Recipient	Park	Supplier	Year	Points
1	Millennium Force	Cedar Point	Intamin	2000	970
2	Superman: Ride of Steel	Six Flags New England	Intamin	2000	897
3	Magnum XL-200	Cedar Point	Arrow Dynamics	1989	723
4	Nitro	Six Flags Great Adventure	B&M	2001	398
5	Apollo's Chariot	Busch Gardens Williamsburg	B&M	1999	359
6	Steel Force	Dorney Park & Wildwater Kingdom	Morgan	1997	353
7	Phantom's Revenge	Kennywood	Arrow Dynamics (rebuilt Morgan)	1991 (rebuilt 2001)	330
8	Expedition GeForce	Holiday Park	Intamin	2001	329
9	Montu	Busch Gardens Tampa Bay	B&M	1996	303
10	Superman: Ride of Steel	Six Flags Darien Lake	Intamin	1999	303
11	Dueling Dragons	Universal's Islands of Adventure	B&M	1999	267
12	Raptor	Cedar Point	B&M	1994	247
13	Alpengeist	Busch Gardens Williamsburg	B&M	1997	244
14	Goliath	Six Flags Magic Mountain	Giovanola	2000	243
14	Raging Bull	Six Flags Great America	B&M	1999	243
16	Superman: Ride of Steel	Six Flags America	Intamin	2000	224
17	The Incredible Hulk Coaster	Universal's Islands of Adventure	B&M	1999	213
18	Nemesis	Alton Towers	B&M	1994	203
19	Kumba	Busch Gardens Tampa Bay	B&M	1993	188
20	X	Six Flags Magic Mountain	Arrow Dynamics	2002	169
21	The Big One	Blackpool Pleasure Beach	Arrow Dynamics	1994	137
22	Mind Bender	Six Flags Over Georgia	Schwarzkopf	1978	131
23	Titan	Six Flags Over Texas	Giovanola	2001	128
24	Mamba	Worlds of Fun	Morgan	1998	102
24	Superman: Krypton Coaster	Six Flags Fiesta Texas	B&M	2000	102

Top 25 Wooden Roller Coasters
Rank	2002 Recipient	Park	Supplier	Year	Points
1	The Raven	Holiday World & Splashin' Safari	CCI	1995	838
2	Shivering Timbers	Michigan's Adventure	CCI	1998	788
3	Boulder Dash	Lake Compounce	CCI	2000	764
4	The Legend	Holiday World & Splashin' Safari	CCI	2000	661
5	Phoenix	Knoebels	PTC	1985	604
6	GhostRider	Knott's Berry Farm	CCI	1998	570
7	The Beast	Paramount's Kings Island		1979	394
8	Texas Giant	Six Flags Over Texas	Dinn	1990	363
9	Megafobia	Oakwood Theme Park	CCI	1996	328
10	Rampage	Alabama Splash Adventure	CCI	1998	321
11	Lightning Racer	Hersheypark	GCII	2000	307
12	The Comet	Great Escape	PTC	1994	278
13	Cyclone	Astroland	Harry C. Baker	1927	244
14	Georgia Cyclone	Six Flags Over Georgia	Dinn	1990	221
15	Thunderbolt	Kennywood	John Miller (rebuilt Andy Vettel)	1924 (rebuilt 1968)	218
16	Colossos	Heide Park	Intamin	2001	216
17	The Boss	Six Flags St. Louis	CCI	2000	200
18	Cornball Express	Indiana Beach	CCI	2001	166
19	Villain	Six Flags Ohio	CCI	2000	153
20	Tonnerre de Zeus	Parc Asterix	CCI	1997	152
21	Tremors	Silverwood Theme Park	CCI	1999	149
22	Twister	Knoebels Grove		1999	147
23	Grand National	Blackpool Pleasure Beach	Charles Paige	1935	118
24	Viper	Six Flags Great America		1995	116
25	Wildcat	Hersheypark	GCII	1996	113

=== 2001 winners ===
2001 Golden Ticket Awards
Host Park: Holiday World & Splashin' Safari

Category	Rank	2001 Recipient	Location/Park	Vote
Best Amusement Park	1	Cedar Point	Sandusky, Ohio	21%
Best Amusement Park	2	Universal's Islands of Adventure	Orlando, Florida	12%
Best Amusement Park	3	Knoebel's Grove	Elysburg, Pennsylvania	11%
Best Amusement Park	4	Kennywood	West Mifflin, Pennsylvania	10%
Best Waterpark	1	Schlitterbahn	New Braunfels, Texas	50%
Best Waterpark	2	Disney's Blizzard Beach	Orlando, Florida	7%
Best Waterpark	3	Holiday World & Splashin' Safari	Santa Claus, Indiana	6%
Best Kids' Area	1	Paramount's Kings Island	Kings Mills, Ohio	24%
Best Kids' Area	2	Universal's Islands of Adventure	Orlando, Florida	24%
Best Kids' Area	3	Six Flags Worlds of Adventure	Aurora, Ohio	7%
Friendliest Park Staff	1	Holiday World & Splashin' Safari	Santa Claus, Indiana	60%
Friendliest Park Staff	2	Knoebel's Grove	Elysburg, Pennsylvania	5%
Cleanest Park	1	Holiday World & Splashin' Safari	Santa Claus, Indiana	46%
Cleanest Park	2	Busch Gardens Williamsburg	Williamsburg, Virginia	16%
Cleanest Park	3	Walt Disney World	Orlando, Florida	15%
Best Landscaping	1	Busch Gardens Williamsburg	Williamsburg, Virginia	52%
Best Landscaping	2	Walt Disney World	Orlando, Florida	8%
Best Landscaping	3	Silver Dollar City	Branson, Missouri	6%
Best Food	1	Knoebel's Grove	Elysburg, Pennsylvania	23%
Best Food	2	Silver Dollar City	Branson, Missouri	21%
Best Food	3	Kennywood	West Mifflin, Pennsylvania	10%
Best Shows	1	Six Flags Fiesta Texas	San Antonio, Texas	23%
Best Shows	2	Silver Dollar City	Branson, Missouri	14%
Best Shows	3	Walt Disney World	Orlando, Florida	8%
Best Water Ride	1	Dudley Do-Right's Ripsaw Falls	Universal's Islands of Adventure	35%
Best Water Ride	2	Perilous Plunge	Knott's Berry Farm	9%
Best Water Ride	3	Escape from Pompeii	Busch Gardens Williamsburg	8%
Best Water Ride	4	Journey to Atlantis	SeaWorld Orlando	7%
Best Waterpark Ride	1	Master Blaster	Schlitterbahn	42%
Best Waterpark Ride	2	Raging River	Schlitterbahn	9%
Best Waterpark Ride	3	Summit Plummit	Disney's Blizzard Beach	7%
Best Park Capacity	1	Cedar Point	Sandusky, Ohio	51%
Best Park Capacity	2	Walt Disney World	Orlando, Florida	12%
Best Park Capacity	3	Disneyland	Anaheim, California	7%
Best Dark Ride	1	The Amazing Adventures of Spider-Man	Universal's Islands of Adventure	31%
Best Dark Ride	2	Haunted Mansion	Knoebel's Grove	23%
Best Dark Ride	3	Indiana Jones Adventure: Temple of the Forbidden Eye	Disneyland	8%
Best Carousel	1	Knoebel's Grove	Elysburg, Pennsylvania	39%
Best Carousel	2	Santa Cruz Beach Boardwalk	Santa Cruz, California	13%
Best Carousel	3	Six Flags Over Georgia	Atlanta, Georgia	12%
Best Carousel	4	Universal's Islands of Adventure	Orlando, Florida	6%

Top 25 Steel Roller Coasters
Rank	2001 Recipient	Park	Supplier	Year	Points
1	Millennium Force	Cedar Point	Intamin	2000	758
2	Superman: Ride of Steel	Six Flags New England	Intamin	2000	682
3	Magnum XL-200	Cedar Point	Arrow Dynamics	1989	661
4	Steel Force	Dorney Park & Wildwater Kingdom	Morgan	1997	399
5	Montu	Busch Gardens Tampa Bay	B&M	1996	336
6	Superman: Ride of Steel	Six Flags Darien Lake	Intamin	1999	305
7	Apollo's Chariot	Busch Gardens Williamsburg	B&M	1999	298
8	Raptor	Cedar Point	B&M	1994	266
9	The Incredible Hulk Coaster	Universal's Islands of Adventure	B&M	1999	261
10	Alpengeist	Busch Gardens Williamsburg	B&M	1997	252
11	Raging Bull	Six Flags Great America	B&M	1999	220
12	Dueling Dragons	Universal's Islands of Adventure	B&M	1999	210
13	Kumba	Busch Gardens Tampa Bay	B&M	1993	201
14	Goliath	Six Flags Magic Mountain	Giovanola	2000	196
15	Phantom's Revenge	Kennywood	Arrow Dynamics (rebuilt Morgan)	1991 (rebuilt 2001)	168
16	Nitro	Six Flags Great Adventure	B&M	2001	164
17	Mind Bender	Six Flags Over Georgia	Schwarzkopf	1978	163
18	Mamba	Worlds of Fun	Morgan	1998	158
19	Nemesis	Alton Towers	B&M	1994	148
20	Superman: Ride of Steel	Six Flags America	Intamin	2000	146
21	Titan	Six Flags Over Texas	Giovanola	2001	126
22	Medusa	Six Flags Great Adventure	B&M	1999	125
23	Superman: Ultimate Escape	Six Flags Worlds of Adventure	Intamin	2000	100
24	Desperado	Buffalo Bill's	Arrow Dynamics	1994	99
25	Volcano	Paramount's Kings Dominion	Intamin	1998	93

Top 25 Wooden Roller Coasters
Rank	2001 Recipient	Park	Supplier	Year	Points
1	The Raven	Holiday World & Splashin' Safari	CCI	1995	688
2	Shivering Timbers	Michigan's Adventure	CCI	1998	615
3	Boulder Dash	Lake Compounce	CCI	2000	554
4	Phoenix	Knoebels	PTC	1985	533
5	The Legend	Holiday World & Splashin' Safari	CCI	2000	431
6	GhostRider	Knott's Berry Farm	CCI	1998	424
7	Rampage	Alabama Splash Adventure	CCI	1998	369
8	Texas Giant	Six Flags Over Texas	Dinn	1990	363
9	The Comet	Great Escape	PTC	1994	336
10	Megafobia	Oakwood Theme Park	CCI	1996	295
11	Cyclone	Astroland	Harry C. Baker	1927	283
12	The Beast	Paramount's Kings Island		1979	271
13	Lightning Racer	Hersheypark	GCII	2000	269
14	Thunderbolt	Kennywood	John Miller (rebuilt Andy Vettel)	1924 (rebuilt 1968)	192
15	The Boss	Six Flags St. Louis	CCI	2000	186
16	Georgia Cyclone	Six Flags Over Georgia	Dinn	1990	185
17	Villain	Six Flags Ohio	CCI	2000	165
18	Tonnerre de Zeus	Parc Asterix	CCI	1997	142
19	Tremors	Silverwood Theme Park	CCI	1999	137
20	Twister	Knoebels Grove		1999	130
21	Giant Dipper	Santa Cruz Beach Boardwalk	Arthur Loof	1924	129
22	Wildcat	Hersheypark	GCII	1996	125
23	Coaster	Playland	Carl Phare/Walker LeRoy	1968	115
24	Timber Wolf	Worlds of Fun	Dinn	1989	97
25	Cyclone	Riverside Park	Frontier Construction	1983	73

=== 2000 winners ===
2000 Golden Ticket Awards
No host park, the awards were announced from Amusement Today's Arlington, Texas office

Category	Rank	2000 Recipient	Location/Park	Vote
Best Amusement Park	1	Cedar Point	Sandusky, Ohio	33%
Best Amusement Park	2	Knoebels Grove	Elysburg, Pennsylvania	18%
Best Amusement Park	3	Universal's Islands of Adventure	Orlando, Florida	14%
Best Amusement Park	4	Kennywood	West Mifflin, Pennsylvania	11%
Best Waterpark	1	Schlitterbahn	New Braunfels, Texas	49%
Best Waterpark	2	Disney's Blizzard Beach	Orlando, Florida	8%
Best Waterpark	3	Wildwater Kingdom	Allentown, Pennsylvania	7%
Friendliest Park	1	Holiday World & Splashin' Safari	Santa Claus, Indiana	45%
Friendliest Park	2	Knoebels Grove	Elysburg, Pennsylvania	13%
Friendliest Park	3	Walt Disney World	Orlando, Florida	13%
Cleanest Park	1	Holiday World & Splashin' Safari	Santa Claus, Indiana	28%
Cleanest Park	2	Busch Gardens Williamsburg	Williamsburg, Virginia	15%
Cleanest Park	3	Walt Disney World	Orlando, Florida	14%
Best Landscaping	1	Busch Gardens Williamsburg	Williamsburg, Virginia	51%
Best Landscaping	2	Walt Disney World	Orlando, Florida	12%
Best Landscaping	3	Alton Towers	Staffordshire, England	6%
Best Food	1	Knoebels Grove	Elysburg, Pennsylvania	20%
Best Food	2	Kennywood	West Mifflin, Pennsylvania	15%
Best Food	3	Busch Gardens Williamsburg	Williamsburg, Virginia	14%
Best Food	4	Universal's Islands of Adventure	Orlando, Florida	10%
Best Shows	1	Six Flags Fiesta Texas	San Antonio, Texas	22%
Best Shows	2	Busch Gardens Williamsburg	Williamsburg, Virginia	18%
Best Shows	3	Walt Disney World	Orlando, Florida	14%
Best Ride Theming	1	Dueling Dragons	Universal's Islands of Adventure	24%
Best Ride Theming	2	Indiana Jones Adventure: Temple of the Forbidden Eye	Disneyland	11%
Best Ride Theming	3	Alpengeist	Busch Gardens Williamsburg	10%
Best Waterpark Ride	1	Master Blaster	Schlitterbahn	35%
Best Waterpark Ride	2	Lazy River	(multiple locations)	16%
Best Waterpark Ride	3	Raging River	Schlitterbahn	9%
Best Park Capacity	1	Cedar Point	Sandusky, Ohio	51%
Best Park Capacity	2	Walt Disney World	Orlando, Florida	7%
Best Park Capacity	3	Disneyland	Anaheim, California	6%
Best Park Capacity	3	Universal's Islands of Adventure	Orlando, Florida	6%
Best Indoor Attraction	1	The Amazing Adventures of Spider-Man	Universal's Islands of Adventure	32%
Best Indoor Attraction	2	Haunted Mansion	Knoebels Grove	15%
Best Indoor Attraction	3	Indiana Jones Adventure: Temple of the Forbidden Eye	Disneyland	8%
Best Non-coaster Ride	1	The Amazing Adventures of Spider-Man	Universal's Islands of Adventure	17%
Best Non-coaster Ride	2	Space Shot	(multiple locations)	13%
Best Non-coaster Ride	3	Giant Drops	(multiple locations)	12%
Best Non-coaster Ride	4	Frisbee	(multiple locations)	9%

Top 25 Steel Roller Coasters
Rank	2000 Recipient	Park	Supplier	Year	Points
1	Magnum XL-200	Cedar Point	Arrow Dynamics	1989	700
2	Millennium Force	Cedar Point	Intamin	2000	464
3	Montu	Busch Gardens Tampa Bay	B&M	1996	327
4	Steel Force	Dorney Park & Wildwater Kingdom	Morgan	1997	319
5	Raptor	Cedar Point	B&M	1994	313
6	Superman: Ride of Steel	Six Flags Darien Lake	Intamin	1999	296
7	Kumba	Busch Gardens Tampa Bay	B&M	1993	241
8	Alpengeist	Busch Gardens Williamsburg	B&M	1997	240
9	Apollo's Chariot	Busch Gardens Williamsburg	B&M	1999	205
10	Superman: Ride of Steel	Six Flags New England	Intamin	2000	192
11	The Incredible Hulk Coaster	Universal's Islands of Adventure	B&M	1999	190
12	Raging Bull	Six Flags Great America	B&M	1999	189
13	Dueling Dragons	Universal's Islands of Adventure	B&M	1999	165
14	Nemesis	Alton Towers	B&M	1994	153
15	Desperado	Buffalo Bill's	Arrow Dynamics	1994	151
16	Mind Bender	Six Flags Over Georgia	Schwarzkopf	1978	144
17	Medusa	Six Flags Great Adventure	B&M	1999	127
18	Goliath	Six Flags Magic Mountain	Giovanola	2000	122
19	Steel Phantom	Kennywood	Arrow Dynamics	1991	119
20	Mamba	Worlds of Fun	Morgan	1998	118
21	Shockwave	Six Flags Over Texas	Schwarzkopf	1978	117
22	Mindbender	Galaxyland	Schwarzkopf	1985	82
23	Big Bad Wolf	Busch Gardens Williamsburg	Arrow Dynamics	1984	81
24	Mantis	Cedar Point	B&M	1996	80
25	Superman: Ultimate Escape	Six Flags Ohio	Intamin	2000	70

Top 25 Wooden Roller Coasters
Rank	2000 Recipient	Park	Supplier	Year	Points
1	The Raven	Holiday World & Splashin' Safari	CCI	1995	502
2	Shivering Timbers	Michigan's Adventure	CCI	1998	490
3	Texas Giant	Six Flags Over Texas	Dinn	1990	459
4	Rampage	Alabama Splash Adventure	CCI	1998	341
5	Phoenix	Knoebels	PTC	1985	337
6	The Beast	Paramount's Kings Island		1979	305
7	The Legend	Holiday World & Splashin' Safari	CCI	2000	287
8	GhostRider	Knott's Berry Farm	CCI	1998	286
9	Megafobia	Oakwood Theme Park	CCI	1996	269
10	The Comet	Great Escape	PTC	1994	253
11	Cyclone	Astroland	Harry C. Baker	1927	212
12	Boulder Dash	Lake Compounce	CCI	2000	201
13	Georgia Cyclone	Six Flags Over Georgia	Dinn	1990	183
14	Thunderbolt	Kennywood	John Miller (rebuilt Andy Vettel)	1924 (rebuilt 1968)	182
15	Twister	Knoebels Grove		1999	165
16	Mean Streak	Cedar Point	Dinn	1991	117
17	Wildcat	Hersheypark	GCII	1996	116
18	Giant Dipper	Santa Cruz Beach Boardwalk	Arthur Loof	1924	114
19	Timber Wolf	Worlds of Fun	Dinn	1989	101
20	Tonnerre de Zeus	Parc Asterix	CCI	1997	91
21	Villain	Six Flags Ohio	CCI	2000	86
22	Coaster	Playland	Carl Phare/Walker LeRoy	1968	79
23	Cyclone	Riverside Park	Frontier Construction	1983	78
24	Viper	Six Flags Great America		1995	77
25	Grizzly	Paramount's Kings Dominion	Taft Broadcasting Company	1982	73

=== 1999 winners ===
1999 Golden Ticket Awards
No host park, the awards were announced from Amusement Today's Arlington, Texas office

Category	Rank	1999 Recipient	Location/Park	Vote
Best Amusement/Theme Park	1	Cedar Point	Sandusky, Ohio	20%
Best Amusement/Theme Park	2	Busch Gardens Williamsburg	Williamsburg, Virginia	14%
Best Amusement/Theme Park	3	Kennywood	West Mifflin, Pennsylvania	13%
Best Amusement/Theme Park	4	Universal's Islands of Adventure	Orlando, Florida	10%
Best Waterpark	1	Schlitterbahn	New Braunfels, Texas	43%
Best Waterpark	2	Wildwater Kingdom	Allentown, Pennsylvania	8%
Best Waterpark	3	Disney's Typhoon Lagoon	Orlando, Florida	7%
Best Waterpark	3	Disney's Blizzard Beach	Orlando, Florida	7%
Friendliest Park	1	Holiday World & Splashin' Safari	Santa Claus, Indiana	29%
Friendliest Park	2	Knoebel's Grove	Elysburg, Pennsylvania	9%
Friendliest Park	3	Walt Disney World	Orlando, Florida	8%
Cleanest Park	1	Busch Gardens Williamsburg	Williamsburg, Virginia	27%
Cleanest Park	2	Walt Disney World	Orlando, Florida	16%
Cleanest Park	3	Holiday World & Splashin' Safari	Santa Claus, Indiana	10%
Best Landscaping	1	Busch Gardens Williamsburg	Williamsburg, Virginia	58%
Best Landscaping	2	Walt Disney World	Orlando, Florida	7%
Best Landscaping	3	Alton Towers	Staffordshire, England	6%
Best Food	1	Busch Gardens Williamsburg	Williamsburg, Virginia	17%
Best Food	1	Kennywood	West Mifflin, Pennsylvania	17%
Best Food	1	Knoebel's Grove	Elysburg, Pennsylvania	17%
Best Shows	1	Six Flags Fiesta Texas	San Antonio, Texas	20%
Best Shows	2	Busch Gardens Williamsburg	Williamsburg, Virginia	17%
Best Shows	3	Dollywood	Pigeon Forge, Tennessee	9%
Best Ride Theming (ride, attraction or queue)	1	Dueling Dragons	Universal's Islands of Adventure	15%
Best Ride Theming (ride, attraction or queue)	2	Nemesis	Alton Towers	13%
Best Ride Theming (ride, attraction or queue)	3	Indiana Jones Adventure: Temple of the Forbidden Eye	Disneyland	11%
Best Ride Theming (ride, attraction or queue)	4	Twilight Zone Tower of Terror	Disney-MGM Studios	10%
Best Waterpark Ride	1	Master Blaster	Schlitterbahn	46%
Best Waterpark Ride	2	Pepsi Aqua Blast	Wildwater Kingdom	7%
Best Park Capacity	1	Cedar Point	Sandusky, Ohio	40%
Best Park Capacity	2	Walt Disney World	Orlando, Florida	14%
Best Park Capacity	3	Kennywood	West Mifflin, Pennsylvania	9%
Best Indoor Attraction (noncoaster)	1	The Amazing Adventures of Spider-Man	Universal's Islands of Adventure	17%
Best Indoor Attraction (noncoaster)	1	Haunted Mansion	Knoebel's Grove	17%
Best Indoor Attraction (noncoaster)	3	Indiana Jones Adventure: Temple of the Forbidden Eye	Disneyland	9%
Best Non-coaster Ride	1	Giant Drops	(multiple locations)	19%
Best Non-coaster Ride	2	Space Shot	(multiple locations)	17%
Best Non-coaster Ride	3	The Amazing Adventures of Spider-Man	Universal's Islands of Adventure	7%

Top 25 Steel Roller Coasters
Rank	1999 Recipient	Park	Supplier	Year	Points
1	Magnum XL-200	Cedar Point	Arrow Dynamics	1989	637
2	Montu	Busch Gardens Tampa Bay	B&M	1996	391
3	Steel Force	Dorney Park & Wildwater Kingdom	Morgan	1997	364
4	Alpengeist	Busch Gardens Williamsburg	B&M	1997	319
5	Kumba	Busch Gardens Tampa Bay	B&M	1993	293
6	Raptor	Cedar Point	B&M	1994	260
7	Desperado	Buffalo Bill's	Arrow Dynamics	1994	189
8	Mind Bender	Six Flags Over Georgia	Schwarzkopf	1978	174
9	Mamba	Worlds of Fun	Morgan	1998	151
10	Superman: Ride of Steel	Six Flags Darien Lake	Intamin	1999	147
11	Steel Phantom	Kennywood	Arrow Dynamics	1991	127
12	Shockwave	Six Flags Over Texas	Schwarzkopf	1978	117
13	Nemesis	Alton Towers	B&M	1994	97
14	Raging Bull	Six Flags Great America	B&M	1999	96
15	Big Bad Wolf	Busch Gardens Williamsburg	Arrow Dynamics	1984	95
16	Medusa	Six Flags Great Adventure	B&M	1999	94
17	Mindbender	Galaxyland	Schwarzkopf	1985	93
18	Top Gun	Paramount's Carowinds	B&M	1999	77
19	The Incredible Hulk Coaster	Universal's Islands of Adventure	B&M	1999	75
20	Apollo's Chariot	Busch Gardens Williamsburg	B&M	1999	69
21	Dueling Dragons	Universal's Islands of Adventure	B&M	1999	64
22	Viper	Six Flags Magic Mountain	Arrow Dynamics	1990	63
23	Steel Eel	SeaWorld San Antonio	Morgan	1999	61
24	Taz's Texas Tornado	AstroWorld	Schwarzkopf	1998	59
25	Batman: The Ride	Six Flags Great America	B&M	1992	57

Top 25 Wooden Roller Coasters
Rank	1999 Recipient	Park	Supplier	Year	Points
1	Texas Giant	Six Flags Over Texas	Dinn	1990	515
2	The Raven	Holiday World & Splashin' Safari	CCI	1995	391
3	Rampage	Alabama Splash Adventure	CCI	1998	345
4	Shivering Timbers	Michigan's Adventure	CCI	1998	338
5	The Comet	Great Escape	PTC	1994	286
6	Phoenix	Knoebels	PTC	1985	279
7	The Beast	Paramount's Kings Island		1979	274
8	Cyclone	Astroland	Harry C. Baker	1927	241
9	Georgia Cyclone	Six Flags Over Georgia	Dinn	1990	220
10	Megafobia	Oakwood Theme Park	CCI	1996	185
11	Thunderbolt	Kennywood	John Miller (rebuilt Andy Vettel)	1924 (rebuilt 1968)	181
12	Wildcat	Hersheypark	GCII	1996	170
13	GhostRider	Knott's Berry Farm	CCI	1998	164
14	Timber Wolf	Worlds of Fun	Dinn	1989	131
15	Cyclone	Riverside Park	Frontier Construction	1983	106
16	Giant Dipper	Santa Cruz Beach Boardwalk	Arthur Loof	1924	103
17	Grizzly	Paramount's Kings Dominion	Taft Broadcasting Company	1982	100
18	Mean Streak	Cedar Point	Dinn	1991	98
19	Viper	Six Flags Great America		1995	80
20	Coaster	Playland	Carl Phare/Walker LeRoy	1958	68
21	The Wild One	Six Flags America	Dinn	1986	64
22	Jack Rabbit	Kennywood	Harry C. Baker	1920	62
23	Grand National	Blackpool Pleasure Beach	Charles Paige	1935	61
24	The Great White	Wild Wheels Pier	CCI	1996	51
25	Big Dipper	Geauga Lake	John Miller	1926	49

=== 1998 winners ===
1998 Golden Ticket Awards
No host park, the awards were announced from Amusement Today's Arlington, Texas office

Category	Rank	1998 Recipient	Location/Park	Vote
Best Amusement/Theme Park	1	Cedar Point	Sandusky, Ohio	37%
Best Amusement/Theme Park	2	Busch Gardens Williamsburg	Williamsburg, Virginia	16%
Best Amusement/Theme Park	3	Kennywood	West Mifflin, Pennsylvania	9%
Best Waterpark	1	Schlitterbahn	New Braunfels, Texas	28%
Best Waterpark	2	Disney's Blizzard Beach	Orlando, Florida	12%
Friendliest Park	1	Holiday World & Splashin' Safari	Santa Claus, Indiana	22%
Friendliest Park	2	Six Flags Over Texas	Arlington, Texas	17%
Friendliest Park	3	Busch Gardens Williamsburg	Williamsburg, Virginia	10%
Cleanest Park	1	Busch Gardens Williamsburg	Williamsburg, Virginia	24%
Cleanest Park	2	Disneyland	Anaheim, California	14%
Cleanest Park	3	Walt Disney World	Orlando, Florida	11%
Best Landscaping	1	Busch Gardens Williamsburg	Williamsburg, Virginia	62%
Best Landscaping	2	Disneyland	Anaheim, California	6%
Best Landscaping	2	Walt Disney World	Orlando, Florida	6%
Best Landscaping	2	Busch Gardens Tampa Bay	Tampa, Florida	6%
Best Food	1	Busch Gardens Williamsburg	Williamsburg, Virginia	21%
Best Food	2	Kennywood	West Mifflin, Pennsylvania	15%
Best Food	3	Six Flags Fiesta Texas	San Antonio, Texas	9%
Best Food	3	Epcot Center	Orlando, Florida	9%
Best Shows	1	Busch Gardens Williamsburg	Williamsburg, Virginia	19%
Best Shows	2	Six Flags Fiesta Texas	San Antonio, Texas	14%
Best Shows	3	Walt Disney World	Orlando, Florida	12%
Best Themed Ride	1	Nemesis	Alton Towers	11%
Best Themed Ride	1	Batman: The Ride	Six Flags Great America	11%
Best Themed Ride	1	Alpengeist	Busch Gardens Williamsburg	11%
Best Themed Ride	4	The Twilight Zone Tower of Terror	Disney-MGM Studios	10%
Best Waterpark Ride	1	Master Blaster	Schlitterbahn	29%
Best Waterpark Ride	2	Journey to the Center of the Earth	Hyland Hills Water World	10%
Best Capacity (fastest moving lines)	1	Cedar Point	Sandusky, Ohio	38%
Best Capacity (fastest moving lines)	2	Disneyland	Anaheim, California	15%
Best Simulator/Indoor Attraction	1	Back to the Future: The Ride	Universal Studios Florida	23%
Best Simulator/Indoor Attraction	2	Star Tours	Disneyland	17%
Best Simulator/Indoor Attraction	3	T2 3-D: Battle Across Time	Universal Studios Florida	15%
Best Simulator/Indoor Attraction	4	Dino Island	multiple locations	11%
Best Non-coaster Ride	1	Giant Drops	(multiple locations)	21%
Best Non-coaster Ride	2	Space Shot	(multiple locations)	15%
Best Non-coaster Ride	3	Skycoaster	(multiple locations)	11%

Top 25 Steel Roller Coasters
Rank	1998 Recipient	Park	Supplier	Year	Points
1	Magnum XL-200	Cedar Point	Arrow Dynamics	1989	466
2	Alpengeist	Busch Gardens Williamsburg	B&M	1997	329
3	Montu	Busch Gardens Tampa Bay	B&M	1996	311
4	Kumba	Busch Gardens Tampa Bay	B&M	1993	257
5	Steel Force	Dorney Park & Wildwater Kingdom	Morgan	1997	241
6	Raptor	Cedar Point	B&M	1994	203
7	Mamba	Worlds of Fun	Morgan	1998	176
8	Desperado	Buffalo Bill's	Arrow Dynamics	1994	146
9	Big Bad Wolf	Busch Gardens Williamsburg	Arrow Dynamics	1984	113
10	Nemesis	Alton Towers	B&M	1994	100
11	Steel Phantom	Kennywood	Arrow Dynamics	1991	94
12	Mind Bender	Six Flags Over Georgia	Schwarzkopf	1978	90
13	Mindbender	Galaxyland	Schwarzkopf	1985	84
14	Mantis	Cedar Point	B&M	1996	83
15	Taz's Texas Tornado	Six Flags AstroWorld	Schwarzkopf	1998	82
15	Loch Ness Monster	Busch Gardens Williamsburg	Arrow Dynamics	1978	82
17	Shockwave	Six Flags Over Texas	Schwarzkopf	1978	74
18	Big One	Blackpool Pleasure Beach	Arrow Dynamics	1994	61
19	Batman: The Ride	Six Flags Great Adventure	B&M	1993	57
20	Superman: The Escape	Six Flags Magic Mountain	Intamin	1997	53
21	Batman: The Ride	Six Flags St. Louis	B&M	1995	52
22	The Great White	SeaWorld San Antonio	B&M	1997	49
23	Mr. Freeze	Six Flags Over Texas	Premier Rides	1998	47
23	Batman: The Ride	Six Flags Great America	B&M	1992	47
25	Crazy Mouse	Dinosaur Beach	Reverchon	1997	45

Top 25 Wooden Roller Coasters
Rank	1998 Recipient	Park	Supplier	Year	Points
1	Texas Giant	Six Flags Over Texas	Dinn	1990	477
2	The Raven	Holiday World & Splashin' Safari	CCI	1995	295
3	The Beast	Kings Island		1979	231
4	The Comet	Great Escape	PTC	1994	213
5	Megafobia	Oakwood Theme Park	CCI	1996	197
6	Shivering Timbers	Michigan's Adventure	CCI	1998	193
7	Cyclone	Astroland	Harry C. Baker	1927	189
8	Timber Wolf	Worlds of Fun	Dinn	1989	168
9	Thunderbolt	Kennywood	John Miller (rebuilt Andy Vettel)	1924 (rebuilt 1968)	157
10	Phoenix	Knoebels	PTC	1985	135
11	Wildcat	Hersheypark	GCII	1996	121
12	Georgia Cyclone	Six Flags Over Georgia	Dinn	1990	96
13	Cyclone	Riverside Park	Frontier Construction	1983	95
14	Grizzly	Paramount's Kings Dominion	Taft Broadcasting Company	1982	85
15	The Wild One	Adventure World	Dinn	1986	77
16	The Great White	Wild Wheels Pier	CCI	1996	69
17	Rampage	VisionLand	CCI	1998	66
18	Giant Dipper	Santa Cruz Beach Boardwalk	Arthur Loof	1924	65
18	Screamin' Eagle	Six Flags St. Louis	PTC	1976	65
20	Jack Rabbit	Kennywood	Harry C. Baker	1920	57
21	Mean Streak	Cedar Point	Dinn	1991	50
22	Coaster	Playland	Carl Phare/Walker LeRoy	1958	49
23	Rebel Yell	Paramount's Kings Dominion	PTC	1975	48
24	Viper	Six Flags Great America		1995	47
25	Blue Streak	Conneaut Lake Park	Ed Vettel	1938	44

=== Publisher's Picks ===
Publisher's Pick Award Winners

Year	Category	Recipient
2026	Turnstile Award	Kentucky Kingdom
2026	Person of the Year Award	Matt Hughey (COTALAND)
2026	Supplier of the Year Award	Vekoma Rides
2026	Show Person of the Year Award	Sandy Schmidt
2026	Park of the Year Award	Knoebels Amusement Resort
2025	Renaissance Award	Les Powers and Bill Prescott (Family Kingdom)
2025	Turnstile Award	Six Flags Hurricane Harbor Los Angeles
2025	Supplier of the Year Award	Eli Bridge Co.
2025	Show Person of the Year Award	Madison Kissel and Savannah Kissel Seibert
2024	Renaissance Award	Alton Towers and Nemesis Reborn
2024	Turnstile Award	Europa-Park
2024	Person of the Year Award	Beth Root
2023	Renaissance Award	Kennywood
2023	Turnstile Award	Carowinds
2022	Renaissance Award	Kennywood
2022	Park of the Year	Kings Island
2022	Turnstile Award	Six Flags Fiesta Texas
2022	Legends Series	Paul and Alethea Roads (Wonderland Park); Dick Knoebel (Knoebels)
2021	Renaissance Award	Six Flags Over Texas
2021	Park of the Year	Universal Orlando
2021	Turnstile Award	Scene75 Entertainment Centers
2021	Legends Series	Larry Bill (The Gravity Group)
2020	Person of the Year	Gene Staples, Indiana Beach
2020	Supplier of the Year	Great Coasters International
2020	Renaissance Award	Europa Park
2020	Turnstile Award	Arnolds Park Amusement Park
2019	Park of the Year	Morey's Piers
2019	Renaissance Award	Kings Island
2019	Turnstile Award	Silverwood
2018	Innovation Award	Chance Rides
2018	Turnstile Award	Silver Dollar City
2017	Person of the Year	Jerry Brick
2017	Park of the Year	Morgan's Wonderland
2017	Supplier of the Year	Intamin
2016	Person of the Year	Raffi Kaprelyan
2016	Renaissance Award	Ed Hart
2016	Supplier of the Year	B&M
2016	Park of the Year	Cedar Point
2015	Park of the Year	Lagoon
2015	Persons of the Year	Alberto Zamperla and Valerio Ferrari
2015	Renaissance Award	Huck Finn's Playland
2015	Turnstile Award	Quassy Amusement Park
2014	Persons of the Year	SeaWorld Rescue Team
2013	Person of the Year	John Arie Sr., Fun Spot America Theme Parks
2013	Person of the Year	Kim Samarelli, New Jersey Amusement Association
2013	Supplier of the Year	Ronald Bussink, Bussink Design GmBH
2013	Turnstile Award	Timber Mountain Log Ride, Knott's Berry Farm
2012	Park of the Year	Disney California Adventure
2012	Supplier of the Year	RWS and Associates (Luminosity — Ignite the Night!)
2012	Person of the Year	Tilan K. Fertitta (Galveston Island Historic Pleasure Pier)
2012	Turnstile Award	SeaWorld San Diego
2011	Park of the Year	Gröna Lund
2011	Supplier of the Year	Chance Rides Manufacturing
2011	Legends Series	Richard Kinzel (Cedar Fair Entertainment Company)
2010	Park of the Year	Beech Bend Park
2010	Person of the Year	Jeff Novotny (National Roller Coaster Museum and Archives)
2010	Legends Series	Will Koch (Holiday World & Splashin' Safari)
2009	Park of the Year	Wonderland Park
2009	Persons of the Year	Dick & Barbara Knoebel (Knoebels Amusement Resort)
2009	Supplier of the Year	Gary Goddard Entertainment
2009	Legends Series	Jack Krantz (Adventureland)
2008	Park of the Year	Xocomil Waterpark
2008	Person of the Year	Paul Nelson (Waldameer & Water World)
2008	Supplier of the Year	Zamperla
2007	Park of the Year	Dollywood
2007	Person of the Year	Milton S. Hershey (Hersheypark)
2007	Supplier of the Year	National Ticket Company
2006	Park of the Year	State Fair of Texas
2006	Person of the Year	Pat Thomson (Western Playland)
2006	Supplier of the Year	William H. Robinson
2005	Park of the Year	Disneyland
2005	Person of the Year	Nick Laskaris (Mount Olympus Water & Theme Park)
2005	Supplier of the Year	Werner Stengel
2004	Park of the Year	Holiday World & Splashin' Safari
2004	Person of the Year	Dan Feicht (Cedar Point)
2004	Supplier of the Year	Philadelphia Toboggan Company
2003	Park of the Year	Cliff's Amusement Park

== Host venues ==
Times hosting	Park/Resort	Years
3	Dollywood	2007, 2012, 2023
3	Holiday World & Splashin' Safari	2001, 2006, 2011
2	Cedar Point	2004, 2016
2	Six Flags Fiesta Texas	2005, 2022
1	Busch Gardens Williamsburg	2010
1	Carowinds	2025
1	COTALAND	2026
1	Give Kids the World Village	2008
1	Kennywood	2024
1	Kings Island	2002
1	Lake Compounce	2017
1	Legoland California	2009
1	Luna Park, Coney Island	2015
1	National Roller Coaster Museum and Archives	2021
1	Quassy Amusement Park	2017
1	Santa Cruz Beach Boardwalk	2013
1	Schlitterbahn	2003
1	SeaWorld San Diego	2014
1	Silver Dollar City	2018
1	Silverwood Theme Park	2019

- From 1998 to 2000, there was no Host Park; the awards were announced from Amusement Today's Arlington, Texas, office instead.
- The 2020 event was canceled due to the COVID-19 pandemic that affected the amusement industry. Voting was not held in 2020, and regular categories were not awarded. Instead, a special category of industry leader awards was created along with publisher picks.

== Former awards ==
- Best Shows (1998–2018) - Busch Gardens Williamsburg (1998), Six Flags Fiesta Texas (1999–2008), Dollywood (2009–2018)
- Cleanest Park (1998–2018) - Busch Gardens Williamsburg (1998–1999), Holiday World & Splashin' Safari (2000–2018)
- Friendliest Park (1998–2018) - Holiday World & Splashin' Safari (1998–2008, 2010–2011), Silver Dollar City (2009), Dollywood (2012–2018)
- Best Marine Life Park (2006–2018) SeaWorld Orlando
- Best Carousel (2007–2018) Grand Carousel, Knoebels Amusement Resort
- Best Indoor Roller Coaster (2007–2018) - Revenge of the Mummy: The Ride, Universal Studios Florida (2007–2018)
- Best Seaside Park (2007–2018) - Santa Cruz Beach Boardwalk (2007–2014, 2016–2018), Morey's Piers (2015)
- Best Funhouse/Walk-Through (2008–2018) - Frankenstein's Castle, Indiana Beach (2008–2009), Noah's Ark, Kennywood, (2010–2018)
  - The award for Best Shows was revamped after 2018 to showcase a specific new show at a park.
- Best Halloween Event (published 2005–2023 for seasons 2004–2022) - Knott's Berry Farm (2005, 2007), Universal's Halloween Horror Nights (2006, 2008-2018, 2021-2022), Six Flags Fiesta Texas (2020). (Note: Awards were given the following year for seasonal events, meaning the listed year's award would be published in the following year's publication. No award was given out in 2020 for the 2019 season.)
- Best Christmas Event (published 2007–2023 for seasons 2006–2022) - Dollywood (2006–2022)
- Best Indoor Waterpark (2007–2013) - Schlitterbahn Galveston Island (tied 2007, 2008–2013), World Waterpark (tied 2007)
- Best Food (1998-2025) - Knoebels for twenty-three out of the twenty-seven years, including one tie.

== Repeat winners ==
- Best Amusement Park – Europa-Park for nine of the last 10 years.
- Best Water Park – Schlitterbahn for 26 of the last 27 years.
- Best Landscaping/Most Beautiful Park – Busch Gardens Williamsburg for 26 of the 27 years.
- Best Steel Roller Coaster – Fury 325 for the last nine years.
- Best Wooden Roller Coaster - Phoenix, Knoebels, winner since 2018.
- Best Indoor Waterpark – Schlitterbahn Galveston Island for all 8 years the award has been given.
- Best Outdoor Production Show – IllumiNations: Reflections of Earth at Epcot for 12 out of the 13 years the award has been given.

== See also ==
- Attractions Magazine
- Funworld Magazine
