= Golden Ticket Award for Best New Attraction Installation =

Amusement park industry award

- Awarded for: Best New Attraction Installation in Amusement parks
- Country: United States
- Presented by: Amusement Today
- First award: 2019
- Currently held by: Falcons Flight
- Website: goldenticketawards.com

The Golden Ticket Award for Best New Attraction Installation is presented by Amusement Today to the best new attraction installation in the amusement park industry.

== History ==
The Golden Ticket Awards have been presenting awards since 1998 acknowledging the amusement industry achievement in different categories. The Best New Attraction Installation award was introduced in 2019 and the first award was presented to Hagrid's Magical Creatures Motorbike Adventure at Universal Islands of Adventure. Before 2019, there was one award recognizing new attractions, which then was divided up to showcase more rides in the industry.

The award is based on the attraction's uniqueness, popularity, theming and effect on the industry.

== Attraction Installation recipients ==
Year	Winner	Park	Other candidates
2019	Hagrid's Magical Creatures Motorbike Adventure	Universal Islands of Adventure	Steel Curtain at Kennywood; Copperhead Strike at Carowinds; Sesame Street: Street Mission at PortAventura World; Zénith at Méga-Parc
2021	Star Wars: Rise of the Resistance	Disney's Hollywood Studios	VelociCoaster at Universal Islands of Adventure; F.L.Y. at Phantasialand; Mystic River Falls at Silver Dollar City; The Ride to Happiness at Plopsaland De Panne
2022	Guardians of the Galaxy: Cosmic Rewind	Epcot	Kangaroo at Kennywood; Dr. Diabolical's Cliffhanger at Six Flags Fiesta Texas; Volkanu: Quest for the Golden Idol at Lost Island Theme Park; Fireball at Adventureland
2023	ArieForce One	Fun Spot America Atlanta	Mario Kart: Bowser's Challenge at Universal Studios Hollywood; Toutatis at Parc Astérix; Leviathan at Sea World; Big Bear Mountain at Dollywood
2024	Fire in the Hole	Silver Dollar City	Voltron Nevera at Europa-Park; Bobcat at Six Flags Great Escape and Hurricane Harbor; Primordial at Lagoon; Good Gravy! at Holiday World & Splashin' Safari
2025	Harry Potter and the Battle at the Ministry	Universal Epic Universe	Stardust Racers at Universal Epic Universe; Danse Macabre at Efteling; Constellation Carousel at Universal Epic Universe; Joy's Happy Swing at Morgan's Wonderland
2026	Falcons Flight	Six Flags Qiddiya City	Phantom Theater: Opening Nightmare at Kings Island; WingZ of Wonder at Morgan's Wonderland; GalactiCoaster at Legoland Florida; Junoon Drop at Aquarabia; Reef Runners at Seabreeze
