= Golden Ticket Award for Best New Roller Coaster =

Amusement park industry award

- Awarded for: Best new roller coaster in Amusement parks
- Country: United States
- Presented by: Amusement Today
- First award: 2019
- Currently held by: Falcons Flight
- Website: goldenticketawards.com

The Golden Ticket Award for Best New Roller Coaster is presented by Amusement Today to the best new roller coaster in the amusement park industry.

== History ==
The Golden Ticket Awards have been presenting awards since 1998 acknowledging the amusement industry achievement in different categories. The Best New Roller Coaster award was introduced in 2019 and the first award was presented to Steel Curtain at Kennywood. From 2005 to 2018, new roller coasters were eligible for the Best New Ride (amusement park) category. In 2019, that category was divided up to showcase more new rides in the industry. The Best New Roller Coaster category honors the best roller coaster regardless of structural material.

== Roller coaster recipients ==
Year	Winner	Park	Other candidates
2019	Steel Curtain	Kennywood	Hagrid's Magical Creatures Motorbike Adventure at Islands of Adventure; Copperhead Strike at Carowinds; Yukon Striker at Canada's Wonderland; Untamed at Walibi Holland
2021	VelociCoaster	Universal's Islands of Adventure	Candymonium at Hersheypark; F.L.Y. at Phantasialand; Texas Stingray at SeaWorld San Antonio; Orion at Kings Island
2022	Iron Gwazi	Busch Gardens Tampa Bay	Guardians of the Galaxy: Cosmic Rewind at Epcot; Ice Breaker at SeaWorld Orlando; Pantheon at Busch Gardens Williamsburg; Dr. Diabolical's Cliffhanger at Six Flags Fiesta Texas
2023	Wildcat's Revenge	Hersheypark	ArieForce One at Fun Spot America Atlanta; Big Bear Mountain at Dollywood; Toutatis at Parc Astérix; Zambezi Zinger at Worlds of Fun
2024	Voltron Nevera	Europa-Park	Bobcat at Six Flags Great Escape and Hurricane Harbor; Hyperia at Thorpe Park; Good Gravy! at Holiday World & Splashin' Safari; Primordial at Lagoon
2025	Stardust Racers	Universal Epic Universe	AlpenFury at Canada's Wonderland; Siren's Curse at Cedar Point; Top Thrill 2 at Cedar Point; Big Bad Wolf: The Wolf's Revenge at Busch Gardens Williamsburg
2026	Falcons Flight	Six Flags Qiddiya City	Tormenta Rampaging Run at Six Flags Over Texas; Quantum Accelerator at Six Flags New England; Colossus at Six Flags Qiddiya City; GalactiCoaster at Legoland Florida
