= Good Gravy! (roller coaster) =

Family shuttle roller coaster at Holiday World

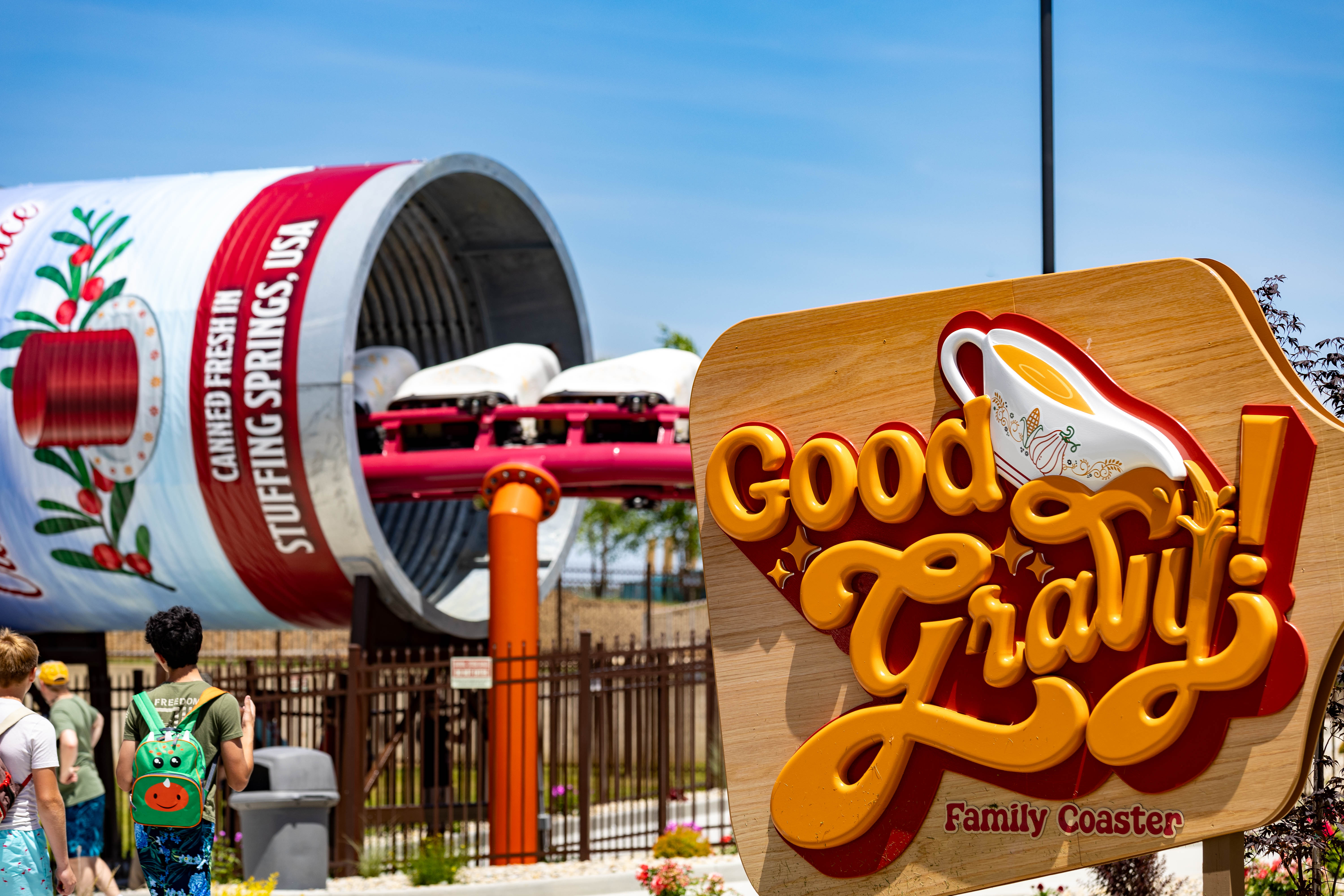
- The coaster's entry sign and its cranberry sauce can tunnel

Holiday World & Splashin' Safari
- Location: Holiday World & Splashin' Safari
- Park section: Thanksgiving
- Coordinates: 38.12210°N 86.90931°W
- Status: Operating
- Opening date: May 11, 2024; 2 years ago
- Replaced: Giraffica

General statistics
- Type: Steel – Shuttle
- Manufacturer: Vekoma
- Model: Family Boomerang
- Lift/launch system: Drive tire lift hill
- Height: 77 ft (23 m)
- Length: 721.8 ft (220.0 m)
- Speed: 37 mph (60 km/h)
- Inversions: 0
- Height restriction: 38 in (97 cm)
- Trains: Single train with 10 cars; riders arranged 2 across in a single row for a total of 20 riders per train
- Must transfer from wheelchair
- Good Gravy! at RCDB

Good Gravy! is a family shuttle roller coaster at Holiday World & Splashin' Safari in Santa Claus, Indiana. It is a custom version of Vekoma's Family Boomerang model, and it opened on May 11, 2024. It is themed to a Thanksgiving dinner, and has received praise for its decorations and theming.

== History ==
Following the removal of Giraffica (formerly Pilgrams Plunge), a shoot the chutes ride built by Intamin, Holiday World began seeking a ride to construct in its place. The park met with Dutch manufacturer Vekoma at the 2021 International Association of Amusement Parks and Attractions (IAAPA) Expo, where Vekoma suggested their Family Boomerang model. After visiting the park, Vekoma presented multiple layout options before the design was finalized.

Early in the process, the park came up with the idea of a ride themed to a gravy boat. The themed queue building was constructed by Universal Design Associates of Ferdinand, Indiana, while the thematic elements placed along the ride's course were created by 3dxScenic.

On August 1, 2023, Holiday World announced Good Gravy! for the 2024 season as North America's first Family Boomerang roller coaster. In November, the ride's hand-sculpted train was revealed at the 2023 IAAPA Expo. The ride's track was assembled on-site in a period of seven days. On April 11, 2024, Holiday World sent a train filled with plush turkeys for the ride's first test run. The ride officially opened to the public on May 11, 2024.

== Characteristics ==
=== Theme ===
Good Gravy! is themed to a Thanksgiving dinner in which two characters, Grandma Gracy and Grandpa Gavin, have run out of gravy, and riders must ride the coaster to help make more. The ride's queue is themed to a house with a late 1960s and early 1970s aesthetic, featuring items donated from individuals' houses. The train is modeled after a gravy boat filled with gravy. Throughout the ride, the train passes by various theming elements, including a cranberry sauce can, a kitchen timer, and other kitchen items. The roller coaster is located in the Thanksgiving section of the park. The area directly around the ride, called Stuffing Springs, features related theming. Adjacent to the ride is Cranberry Corner, a children's play area inspired by European amusement parks. Nearby, a Dippin' Dots stand is housed in a refurbished 1964 Airstream camper and serves its food in plastic gravy boats.

=== Ride experience ===
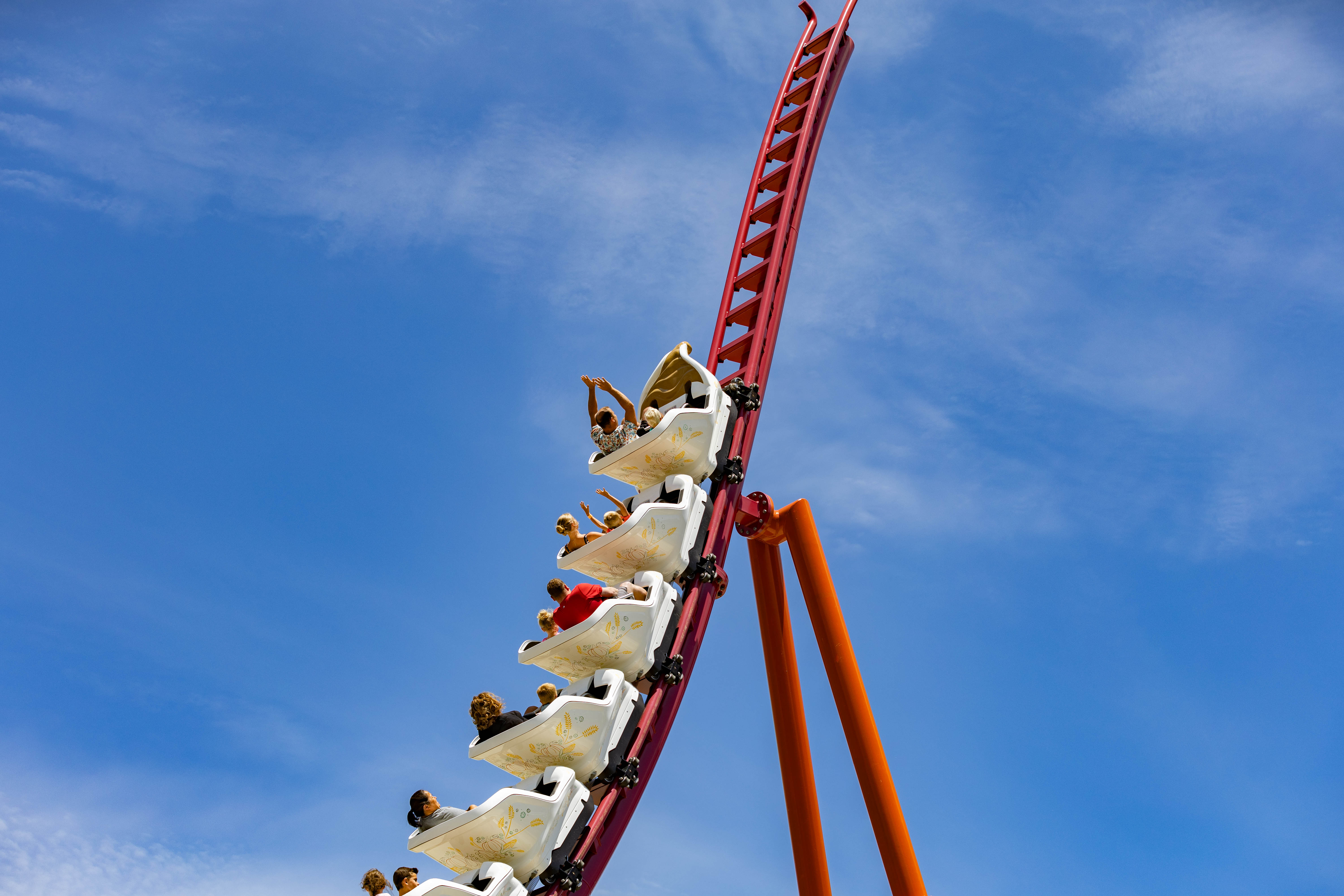
The coaster's forward spike

Good Gravy! is designed for families and children, featuring a minimum height requirement of 38 inches (97 cm). The two-across, ten-car train features an individual T-shaped lap bar for each rider. After boarding, riders are dispatched backwards out of the station and pulled up a tire lift before being released and dropped forwards, reaching top speeds of 37 miles per hour (60 km/h) and passing through the station once more. Riders then take a right turn, travel through an enlarged cranberry sauce can, then turn left. Next, riders traverse a small hill adjacent to an 18-foot-tall rolling pin, then take a right turn followed by a left turn past larger-than-life recreations of a box of stuffing mix, a kitchen timer, a whisk, and a bottle of milk. The train then ascends a spike before rolling back and traversing the track in reverse. The total track length of the coaster is 721.8 feet (220.0 m), and the total track traveled amounts to nearly 1,500 feet (460 m) during the just over one-minute-long ride.

== Reception ==
In Amusement Today's Golden Ticket Awards, Good Gravy! won Best New Theme Concept of 2024, placed second for Best Family Coaster, fourth for Best New Roller Coaster of 2024, and fifth for Best New Attraction Installation of 2024. American Coaster Enthusiasts member Brian Lydy described the coaster as "a world-class attraction" and a "very special experience", mentioning he believed it was "just what the park needed". WGN-TV reporter Marcus LeShock praised the ride's theming, describing the ride as "impressive".
