= Battlestar Galactica: Human vs. Cylon =

Amusement ride

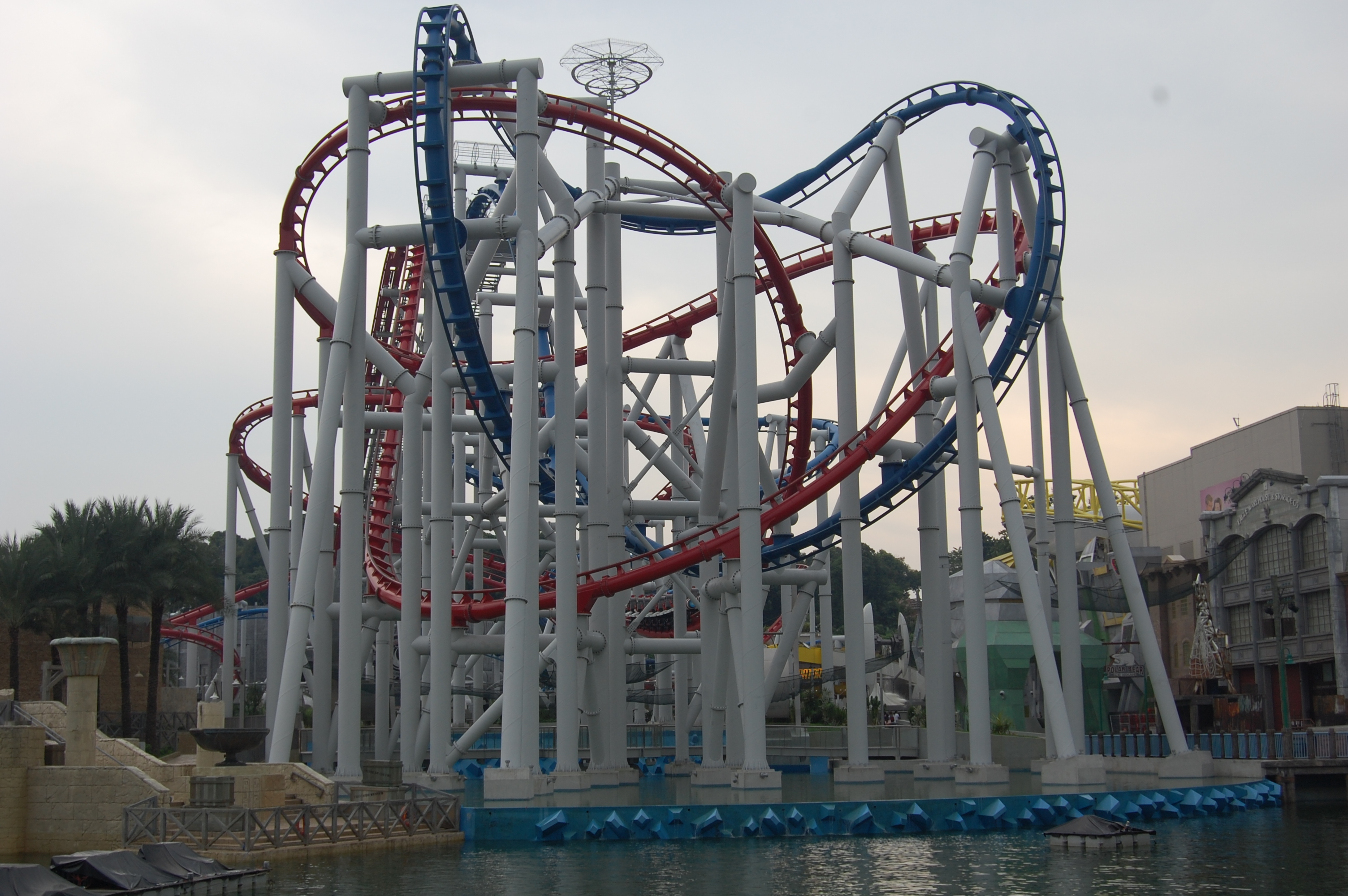
- An overview of the nested tracks of Battlestar Galactica: Human vs. Cylon

Universal Studios Singapore
- Park section: Sci-Fi City
- Coordinates: 1°15′14.92″N 103°49′20.27″E
- Status: Operating
- Opening date: 18 March 2010

General statistics
- Type: Steel – Dueling – Launched
- Manufacturer: Vekoma
- Model: Custom
- Lift/launch system: LSM
	Cylon (Inverted)	Human (Sit-down)
Height	140 ft (42.7 m)	140 ft (42.7 m)
Speed	51.0 mph (82.1 km/h)	56 mph (90.1 km/h)
Inversions	5	0
- Height restriction: 49.2 in (125 cm)
- Trains: 8 cars. Riders are arranged 2 across in a single row for a total of 16 riders per train.
- Theme: Battlestar Galactica
- Battlestar Galactica: Human vs. Cylon at RCDB; Pictures of Battlestar Galactica: Human vs. Cylon at RCDB

Battlestar Galactica: Human vs. Cylon is a pair of steel, dueling roller coasters at Universal Studios Singapore. One of the coasters is an inverted roller coaster track in gray (previously blue until 2017), and the other half is a traditional seated roller coaster in red. The coasters, which opened in 2010 and was inactive between 2013 and 2015, reach 42.5 metres (139 ft) in height and is the tallest dueling coaster in the world.

Universal Studios Singapore is the only Universal Studios amusement park to have a Battlestar Galactica roller coaster. It was the first Vekoma coaster, after the Flying Dutchman, to feature four-abreast seating that is similar to coasters by Bolliger & Mabillard, though the trains have since been modified to a more standard two-across arrangement.

== Coasters ==
The roller coaster trains are launched from the start of their lift hill (used to be launched from the station) at high speed instead of the traditional chain lift. Linear Synchronous Motors (LSM) are used for high-acceleration speed during launching. Similar to the now-defunct Dragon Challenge at Universal's Islands of Adventure, these coasters feature several near collisions mere inches apart. Part of the ride took place over the park's central lagoon. The coasters are the tallest dueling coaster in the world at 42.5 metres (139 ft).

=== Battlestar Galactica: Cylon ===
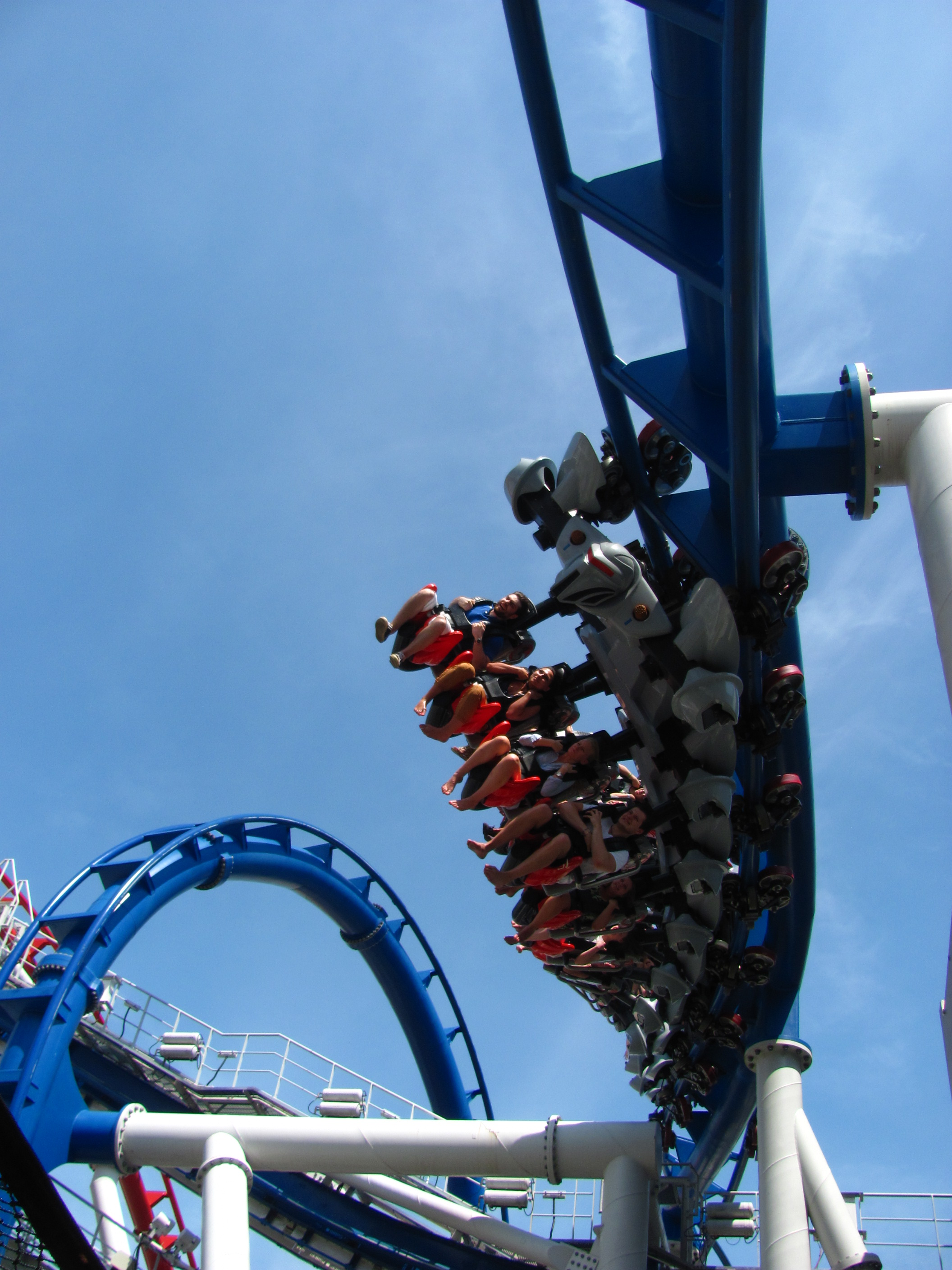
One of the suspended trains on the Cylon side of Battlestar Galactica

The Cylon coaster is a coaster designed like the Cylon Raider suspended from the track with legs free that performs intense manoeuvres that includes five inversions, a cobra roll, a corkscrew, a vertical loop and a zero-g roll. The Cylon coaster also plunges into a 5-metre (16 ft) deep pit filled with artificial fog to give thrill seekers the sensation of a near miss with the ground. It also includes sudden turns close to buildings emphasising the sensation of a near miss. Before the ride starts, a short monologue spoken by a robotic voice states “This has all happened before. This will all happen again.”

==== Ride description ====
The ride is a suspended coaster with 5 inversions. The ride starts with a LSM launch to its max speed of 51.0 mph (82.1 km/h) before diving into a cobra roll. After some time, it goes into a corkscrew. It then plunges into a 5-meter deep pit filled with artificial fog and goes straight into a vertical loop that goes around the launch (which is the most intense part of the ride) and dives down into the pit again. Lastly, it has a zero-g roll over the launch and goes into a helix before reaching the brake run.

=== Battlestar Galactica: Human ===
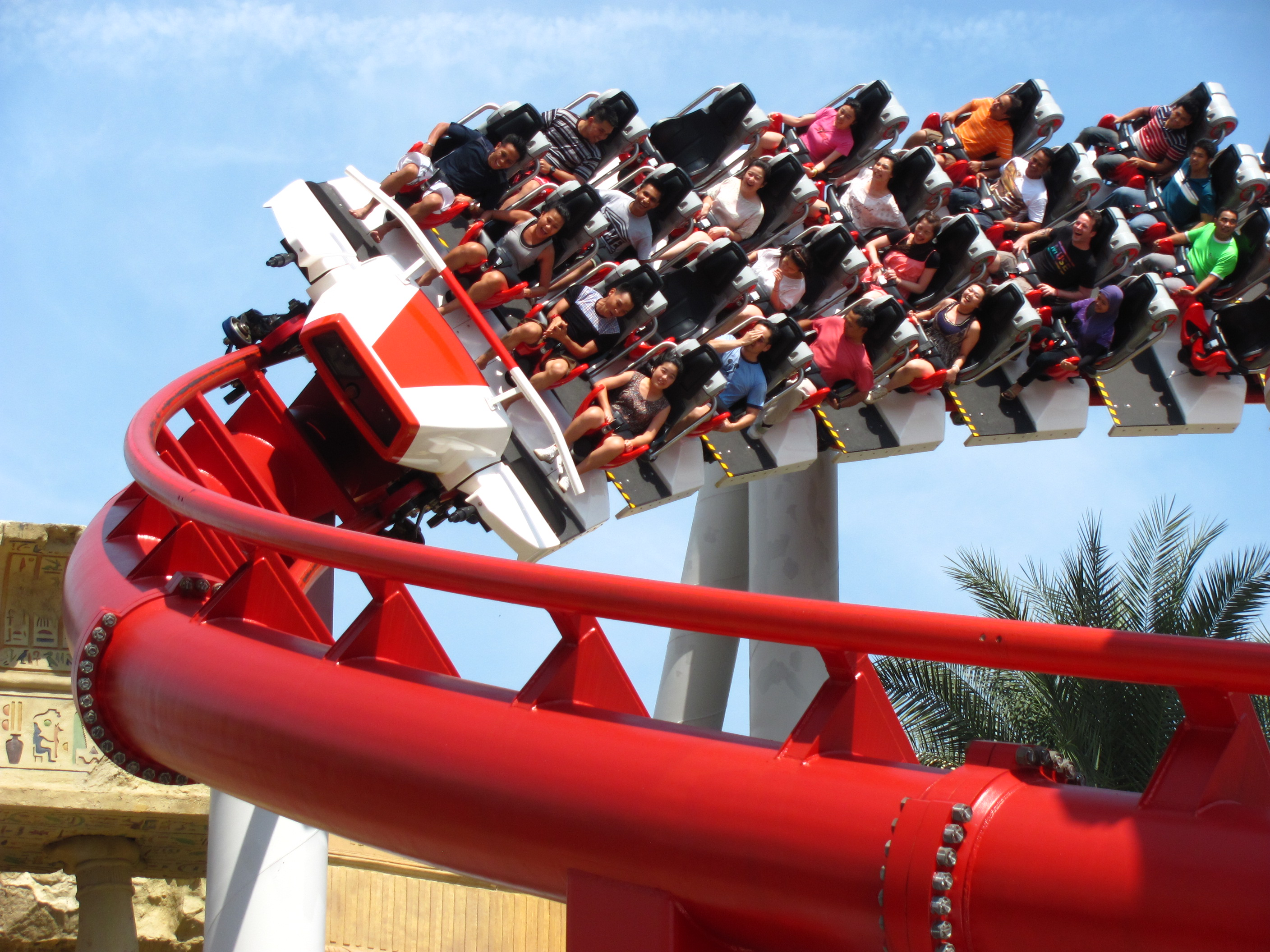
One of the old sit down trains on the Human side of Battlestar Galactica

==== Pre-show ====
The queue for the Human ride firstly is a narrow walkway. The riders enter the ride building where Galactica Actual and Cag Starbuck explain the mission. Then the riders are loaded into the trains. Upon departure, the riders hear the dialogue, "Happy Hunting. So say we all."

==== Ride description ====
The Human coaster is designed like the Colonial Mark II Viper for riders who want a roller coaster experience without inversions. According to Universal Studios Singapore engineers, riders on the Human track experience more G-forces than those on the Cylon track. At the top of the launch, the coaster reaches its top speed of 90 kilometres per hour (56 mph).

== History ==
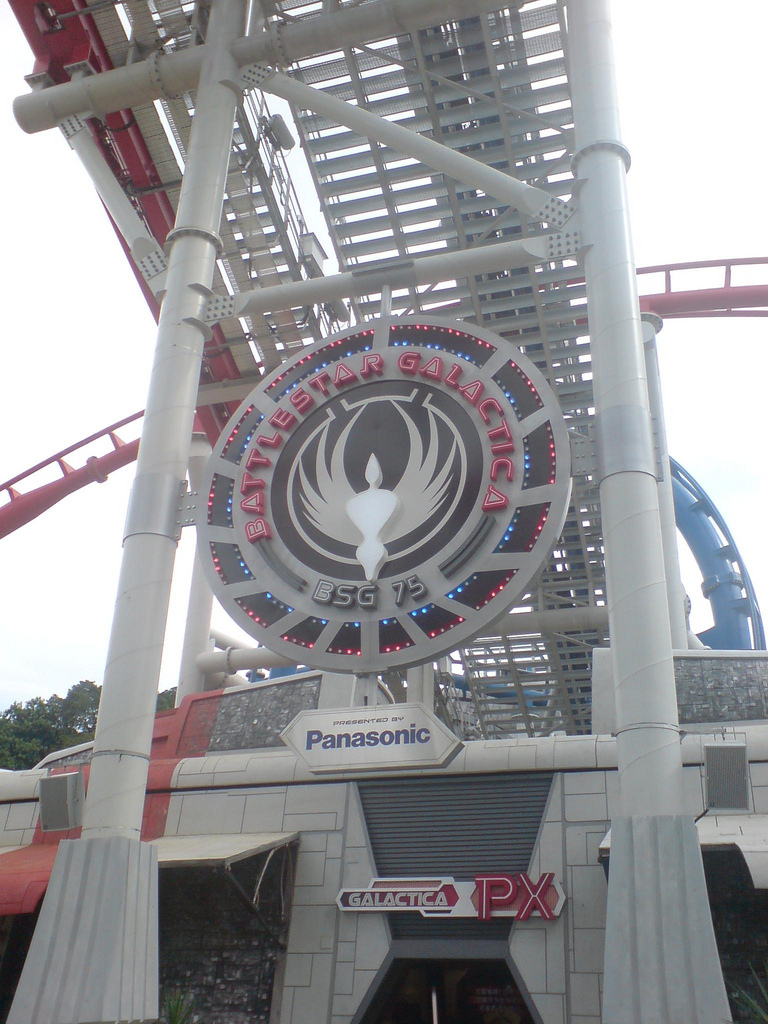
The ride's exit and store

On 18 March 2010, Battlestar Galactica: Human vs. Cylon was one of the 16 attractions that opened during Universal Studios Singapore's soft opening. A week after its opening, Universal Studios Singapore identified a problem in a ride vehicle during routine testing. The ride closed for repair on 25 March 2010. Both rides remained closed for about 11 months thereafter.

In August 2010, Resorts World Sentosa publicly addressed the reason for closure of the ride, stating that the problem lies with the design of the ride vehicles and not the track layout. Higher than anticipated stress and vibration levels caused fatigue cracks to develop in the seat-post supports of the "Human" coaster train. The redesigned component was to eliminate the weld entirely and was also to be installed with additional strength-reinforcement parts. Extensive ride testing cycles and inspections were conducted, as the ride needed to be re-certified before it reopened to the public. In early February 2011, Universal Studios Singapore announced the rides would re-open on 21 February 2011.

On 21 December 2010, Battlestar Galactica: Human vs. Cylon entered the final testing stage with newly reinforced cars for both the "Human" and "Cylon" coasters. On 4 February 2011, the ride was opened unofficially for "technical rehearsals", with the ride officially reopening as planned on 21 February 2011.

On 21 July 2013, the ride was closed again for review. More than a year passed before Resorts World Sentosa announced, in November 2014, that Battlestar Galactica: Human vs Cylon would reopen in early 2015 with new trains. On 25 May 2015, Universal Studios Singapore announced that the ride would return with all-new ride vehicles on 27 May 2015. The ride was officially reopened as planned two days later, with the ride vehicles being changed from four-abreast seating to two-abreast seating.

On 6 April 2016 riders were stuck for about an hour on Human when a technical error occurred on the rides.

On 28 November 2025, Human stalled on the launch, causing 16 riders to get stuck for 30 to 40 minutes in the rain. No injuries were reported and the ride reopened the next day.

== See also ==
- List of amusement rides based on film franchises
- Universal Studios Singapore
- Battlestar Galactica
- Dragon Challenge
- Stardust Racers
