= Dragon Challenge =

Defunct inverted roller coaster at Universal's Islands of Adventure

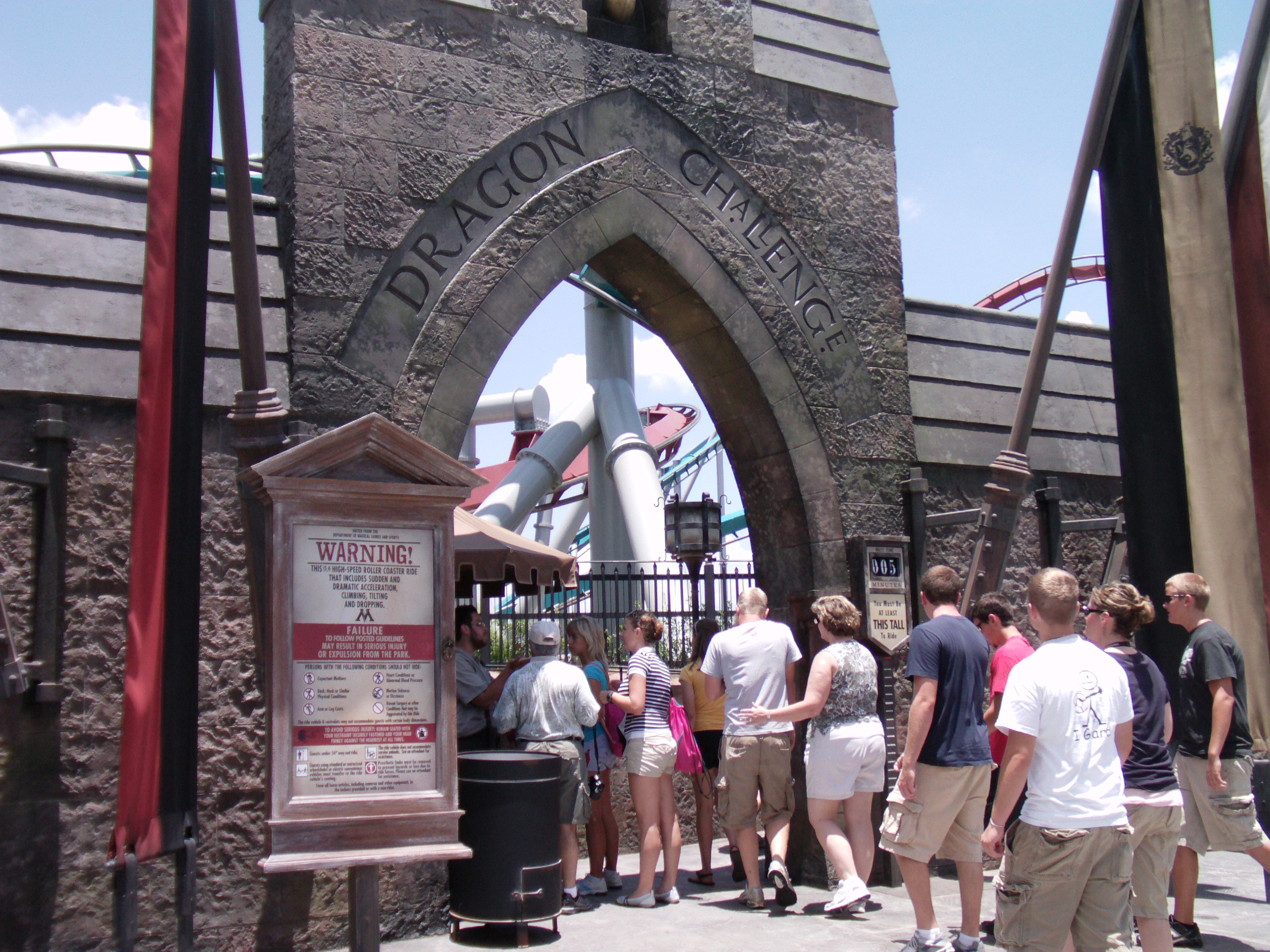
- Entrance to Dragon Challenge
- Previously known as Dueling Dragons (1999–2010)

Universal Islands of Adventure
- Park section: The Wizarding World of Harry Potter (2010-2017) - Hogsmeade
- Coordinates: 28°28′25″N 81°28′24″W
- Status: Removed
- Opening date: May 28, 1999
- Closing date: September 4, 2017
- Replaced by: Hagrid's Magical Creatures Motorbike Adventure

General statistics
- Type: Steel – Inverted – Dueling
- Manufacturer: Bolliger & Mabillard
- Designer: Werner Stengel
- Model: Inverted Coaster
- Lift/launch system: Chain lift hill
	Chinese Fireball	Hungarian Horntail
Height	125 ft (38.1 m)	125 ft (38.1 m)
Drop	115 ft (35.1 m)	95 ft (29.0 m)
Length	3,200 ft (975.4 m)	3,200 ft (975.4 m)
Speed	60 mph (96.6 km/h)	55 mph (88.5 km/h)
Inversions	5	5
Duration	2:25	2:25
- Height restriction: 54 in (137 cm)
- Trains: 8 cars. Riders are arranged 4 across in a single row for a total of 32 riders per train.
- Dragon Challenge at RCDB; Pictures of Dragon Challenge at RCDB

Dragon Challenge, formerly named Dueling Dragons (1999–2010), was a pair of intertwined inverted roller coasters in the Wizarding World of Harry Potter area of Islands of Adventure in Orlando, Florida, United States. Designed by Bolliger & Mabillard of Switzerland, the ride was a dueling roller coaster featuring two tracks – one side was called Chinese Fireball and the other Hungarian Horntail – that were themed as two chasing dragons. Its layout involved two trains sharing adjacent lift hills, with each traversing unique courses. Trains on the Chinese Fireball track reached a maximum speed of 60 mph (97 km/h), while trains on the Hungarian Horntail reached 55 mph (89 km/h). Both tracks featured five inversions and an identical ride duration of 2 minutes and 25 seconds.

The ride debuted as Dueling Dragons during the grand opening of Islands of Adventure on May 28, 1999. It was located in The Lost Continent area, and the dueling trains were named Fire and Ice. After a renovation period, the attraction reopened in March 2010. It was renamed Dragon Challenge for The Wizarding World of Harry Potter grand opening on June 18, 2010.

During much of the ride's history, the trains were dispatched simultaneously, creating three near-miss encounters along the courses. Multiple incidents in 2011 involving injuries to riders, who were hit with loose objects, resulted in an operational change to dispatch trains separately to avoid close encounters. Universal Orlando officials, citing that the ride had reached the end of its service life, made the decision to close Dragon Challenge permanently on September 4, 2017. Hagrid's Magical Creatures Motorbike Adventure opened in its place in 2019, leaving The Incredible Hulk Coaster as the only remaining Bolliger and Mabillard roller coaster at Islands of Adventure.

== History ==
=== Dueling Dragons (1999–2010) ===
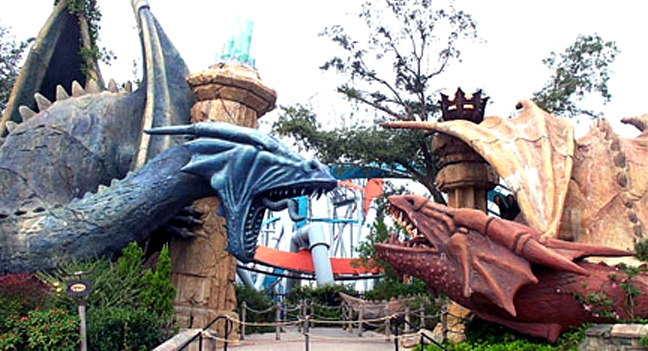
Entrance to the coasters when they were known as Dueling Dragons

In 1997, it was announced that Dueling Dragons would be a part of a new second theme park at the Universal Orlando Resort, Islands of Adventure. The new ride would be a unique dueling inverted roller coaster by Bolliger & Mabillard. It would be placed in a fairy tale-themed land known as the Lost Continent. The coaster would be situated in the Merlinwood area. Dueling Dragons was completed on time, debuting with the premiere of Islands of Adventure on May 28, 1999. At the time, it was the only fully inverted dueling roller coaster in the world. The ride was themed to two dueling dragons. The queue was decorated as a ruined castle that the two dragons destroyed. Once the riders arrived at the station, they chose which of the two coasters they would like to experience, the Fire dragon or the Ice dragon. The original name for Dueling Dragons was going to be "Merlin's Duelling Dragons," and the dragons both had names; Blizzrock for the blue dragon, and Pyrock for the red dragon.

=== Dragon Challenge (2010–2017) ===
On May 31, 2007, Universal announced plans to construct The Wizarding World of Harry Potter, a new section devoted to the popular Harry Potter book and film series. Dueling Dragons, as well as the adjacent roller coaster Flying Unicorn (later renamed Flight of the Hippogriff), were shown to be included in the new section. Universal later announced that Dueling Dragons would be renamed Dragon Challenge upon the re-opening of the attraction and that its two coasters would be renamed Hungarian Horntail and Chinese Fireball.

Construction on re-theming the queue began in the third quarter of 2009. In the first quarter of 2010, the ride closed in order to refurbish the attraction to incorporate the Harry Potter theme. In mid-March 2010, the roller coasters reopened to the public. On June 18, 2010, with the opening of the entire The Wizarding World of Harry Potter section, the ride officially became Dragon Challenge.

During the summer of 2011, there were two accidents (one serious) caused by what is believed to be loose objects hitting riders while riding the roller coaster. The most serious accident involved a rider being struck in the eye by an object, causing injuries which required the removal of the eye. On the same day of the incident, Universal Studios announced that the coasters would not duel until an investigation was completed. For two months the coasters were dispatched separately and in mid-October 2011, Universal made the decision to turn off the dueling aspect of the ride permanently without any explanation to what caused the injuries. No further injuries were reported.

Dragon Challenge was becoming obsolete due to the lack of its dueling feature. In early 2017, rumors were starting to spread that it was to be removed for a new attraction based on the Harry Potter spin-off film Fantastic Beasts and Where to Find Them. It was then confirmed that Universal announced on July 24, 2017, that a new roller coaster was scheduled to debut in 2019, meaning that Dragon Challenge would be officially shut down on September 4, 2017. By late September 2017, Dragon Challenge was being removed and sent to the scrapyard. The ride's replacement, Hagrid's Magical Creatures Motorbike Adventure, opened on June 13, 2019.

=== Legacy ===
A tribute to Dragon Challenge can be found in the queue line of Hagrid's Magical Creatures Motorbike Adventure. Upon exiting the room with cages on the ceiling, guests can find a mural on the left wall. The mural features fire and ice dragons and a message saying Dueling Club.

Universal's Halloween Horror Nights in 2023 featured a haunted house based on the original Dueling Dragons concept called "Dueling Dragons: Choose Thy Fate". The house's story takes place after the events of the original ride where guests choose a path and a victor.

== Ride experience ==
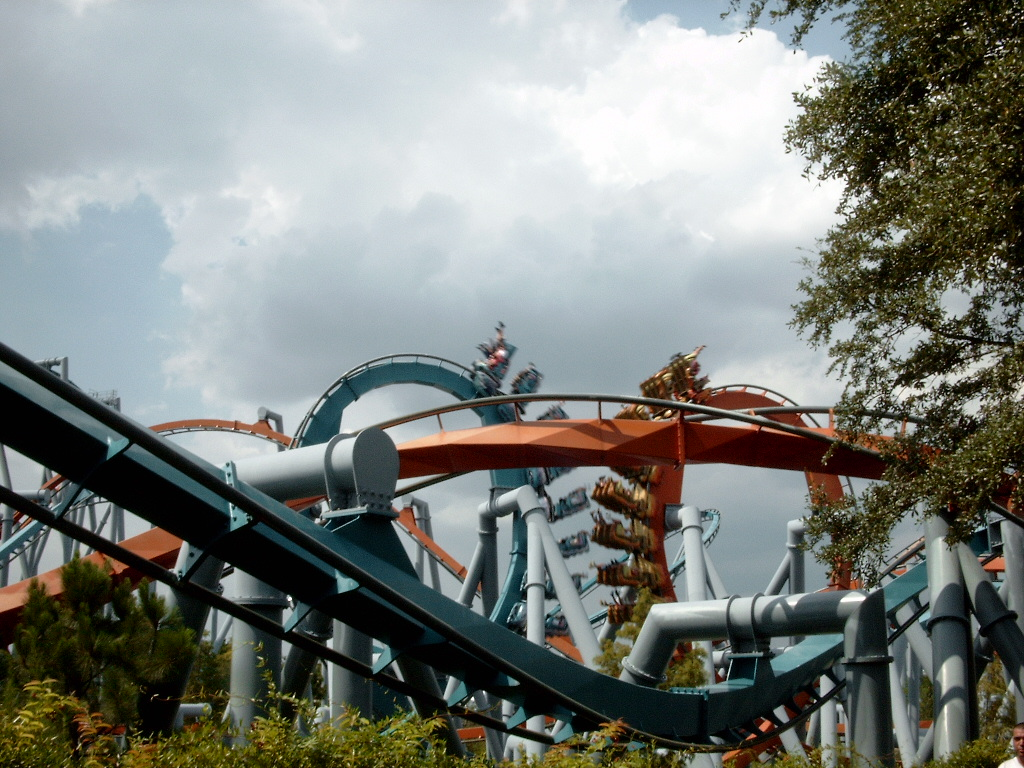
Head-to-head on the former Dueling Dragons

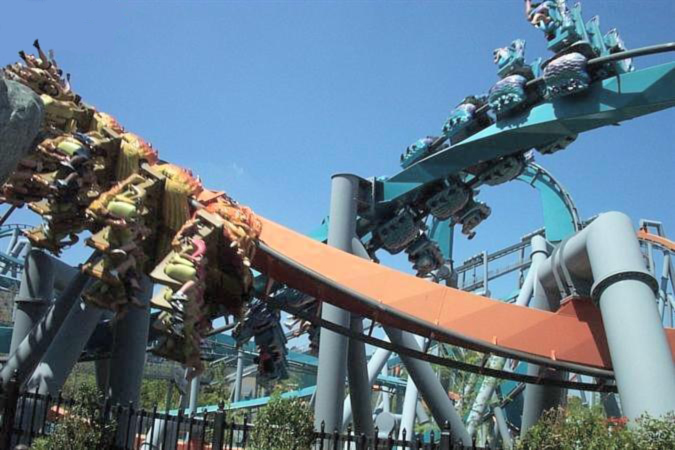
Corkscrew section

=== Queue ===
Before the Harry Potter refurbishment, the queue was themed as a ruined castle where the Fire and Ice dragons lived. The queue passed through dungeons with human skeletons, torches and cobwebs. To ride Fire, guests would go left, while riders wanting to ride Ice would go right at the intersection point.

After the Harry Potter re-theming of the queue, guests were taken past a number of banners for the Triwizard Tournament showing support for the tournament's four contestants. After passing the Weasleys' crashed flying Ford Anglia, they entered the Champions' Tent. From there, guests passed a large pedestal with the Triwizard Cup glowing at the top, and several dark "tunnels" which led to both coaster's stations. Just before entering the station, guests had to choose which coaster they wanted to ride: the Chinese Fireball to the left or the Hungarian Horntail to the right. Once in the station, there was a projection of the dragons on the ceiling.

In April 2015, metal detectors were installed as a permanent fixture to the entrance, and security officers with metal-detecting wands were employed. The attraction enacted a zero tolerance policy for cell phones, wallets, coins, watches, cameras, or other loose objects; all riders were required to completely empty their pockets before boarding. Persons in violation would be sent to the lockers or possibly ejected from the park without a refund.

=== Track layout ===
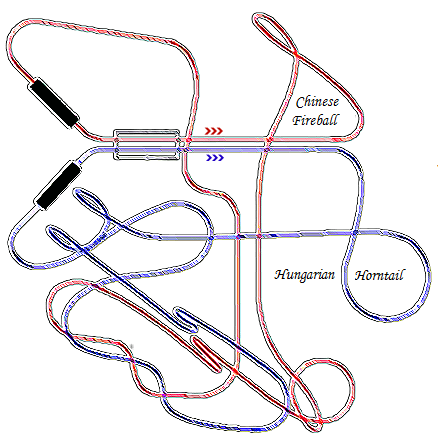
Ride layout

==== Chinese Fireball ====
After departing from the station, the train made a slight left turn leading into the transfer track section before beginning to climb the 125-foot (38 m) lift hill. Once at the top and after going through a pre-drop, the train made a sharp 115-foot (35 m) left-hand drop back to the ground. Then, the train went back up, through an Immelmann followed by a slight air-time downward right turn before entering an air-time hill (this was the first of three near-miss points with the Hungarian Horntail train when the roller coasters duelled). Next, the train dropped back down turning left slightly, leading into a second Immelmann. After a downward right helix and a short section of straight track, the train went through the second former near-miss point with the other train, a vertical loop. After the loop and another section of straight track, the train made a right turn leading into the third and final former near-miss element, which was a corkscrew. Then, the train made a left turn followed by a small drop leading into another section of straight track before entering the final element in the coaster layout, another corkscrew. The train then made a left turn into the final brake run. Following a left turn, the train returned to the station where the riders unloaded and the next riders loaded.

==== Hungarian Horntail ====
After departing from the station, the train made a slight right turn leading into the transfer track section before beginning to climb the 125-foot (38 m) lift hill. Once at the top and after going through a pre-drop, the train made a sharp 95-foot (29 m) right-hand drop back to the ground. Then, the train went through a 270-degree left overbanked turn before entering a Zero-gravity roll, which was the first of three former near-miss points with the Chinese Fireball train. Then, the train made a slight right turn heading straight into a wall before entering a cobra roll. After a straight section of track, the train entered the second former near-miss point with the other train, a vertical loop. The train then made a right turn into the final former near-miss point, a corkscrew. Next, the train made a right turn, followed by a left turn leading into the final brake run. Following a right turn, the train returned to the station where the riders unloaded and the next riders loaded.

=== Track ===
The steel track was approximately 3,200 feet (980 m) in length and the height of the lift was approximately 125 feet (38 m) for both roller coasters. The first drop for Chinese Fireball was 115 feet (35 m) while Hungarian Horntail was 95 feet (29 m). Chinese Fireball's track was red, Hungarian Horntail's was blue, and both coasters' supports were white.

=== Trains ===
Dragon Challenge operated with several steel and fiberglass trains. Each train had eight cars with four seats for a total of 32 riders per train. The trains' front seat resembled a mouth, while the rest bore a resemblance to hands. The Hungarian Horntail trains resembled a blue ice dragon while the Chinese Fireball trains resembled a red fire dragon.

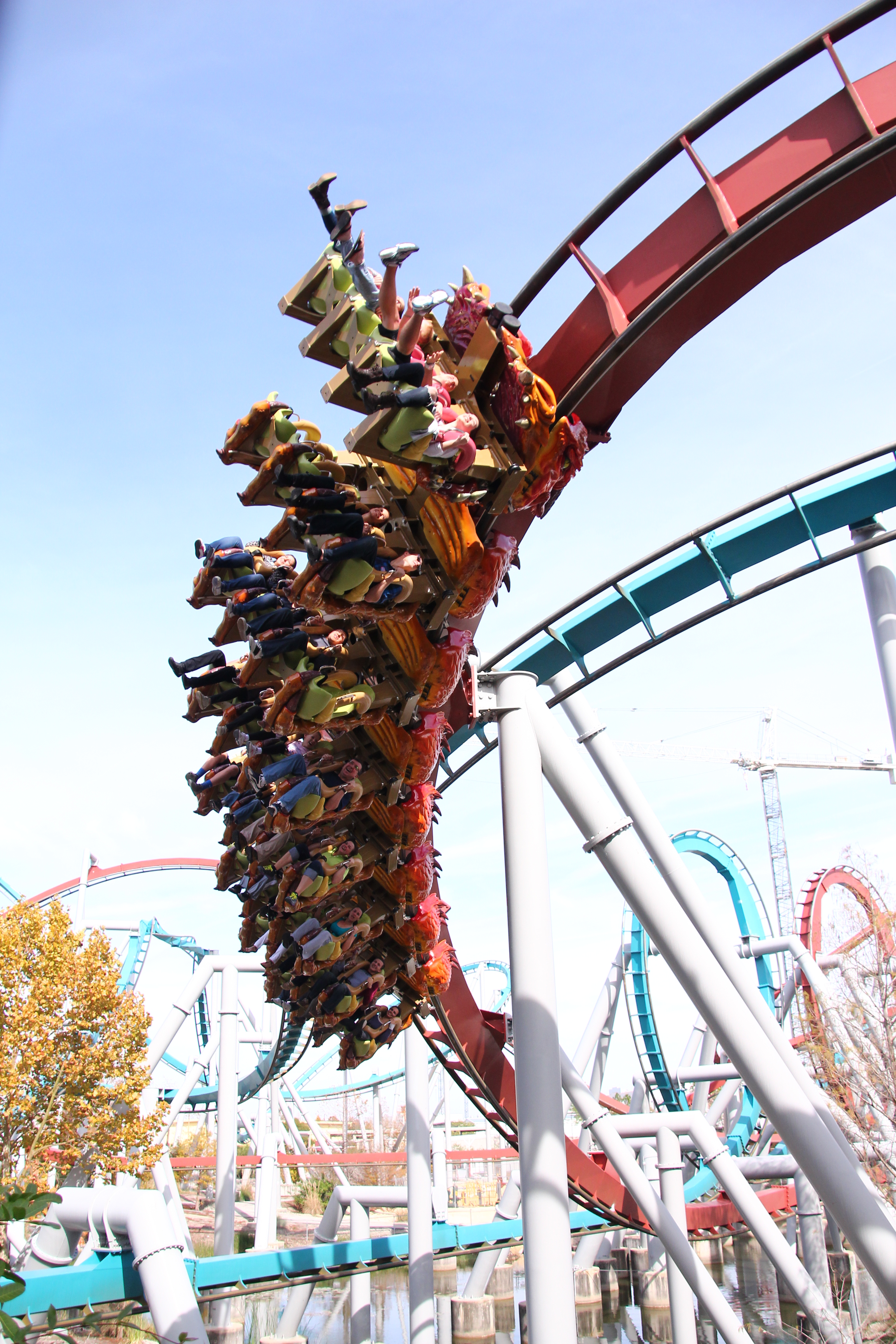
Inverted seating of the Chinese Fireball track

When the coaster cars duelled, in order to make the trains meet at each of the three near-miss points along the layout, the trains would be weighed once they were loaded at the station to adjust the dispatch times. (For example, if the Chinese Fireball train weighed more than the Hungarian Horntail train, the Fireball would be dispatched after the Horntail.)

== Reception ==
Dragon Challenge was generally well received from its opening in 1999 until its closing in 2017. In Amusement Today's annual Golden Ticket Awards for the Top Steel Roller Coasters, Dragon Challenge ranked in the top 50 every year between 2000 and 2012. It peaked at position 11 in 2002.

Golden Ticket Awards: Top steel Roller Coasters
Year									1998	1999
Ranking									–	–
Year	2000	2001	2002	2003	2004	2005	2006	2007	2008	2009
Ranking	13	12	11	14	16	15	18	23	14	17
Year	2010	2011	2012	2013	2014	2015	2016	2017	2018	2019
Ranking	31	28	35	–	–	–	–	–	–	–
Year	2020	2021	2022	2023	2024	2025				
Ranking	N/A	–	–	–	–	–				

== Incidents ==
- On July 1, 2009, an employee was walking underneath the coaster in a restricted area when he was hit by a train during a test run. The victim suffered multiple head injuries and was taken to nearby Orlando Regional Medical Center.
- On July 31, 2011, a tourist was injured when an unidentified object hit him in the eye while riding Dragon Challenge. Prior to the incident, the guest had only one good eye, therefore the incident resulted in the guest completely losing his sight. Dragon Challenge remained shut for less than 24 hours after the incident with Universal concluding that the ride was safe.
- On August 10, 2011, a rider was struck by an object while riding the attraction, injuring his face and leg. As a result of this and the aforementioned incident in which a rider lost sight in one eye, Universal officials announced that the two roller coasters would no longer operate simultaneously, pending an investigation into both incidents. In October 2011, officials suspended the dueling aspect of the ride permanently.

== See also ==
- Incidents at Universal parks
- Battlestar Galactica: Human vs. Cylon
- Stardust Racers
