= Stardust Racers =

Dual launched roller coaster at Universal Epic Universe

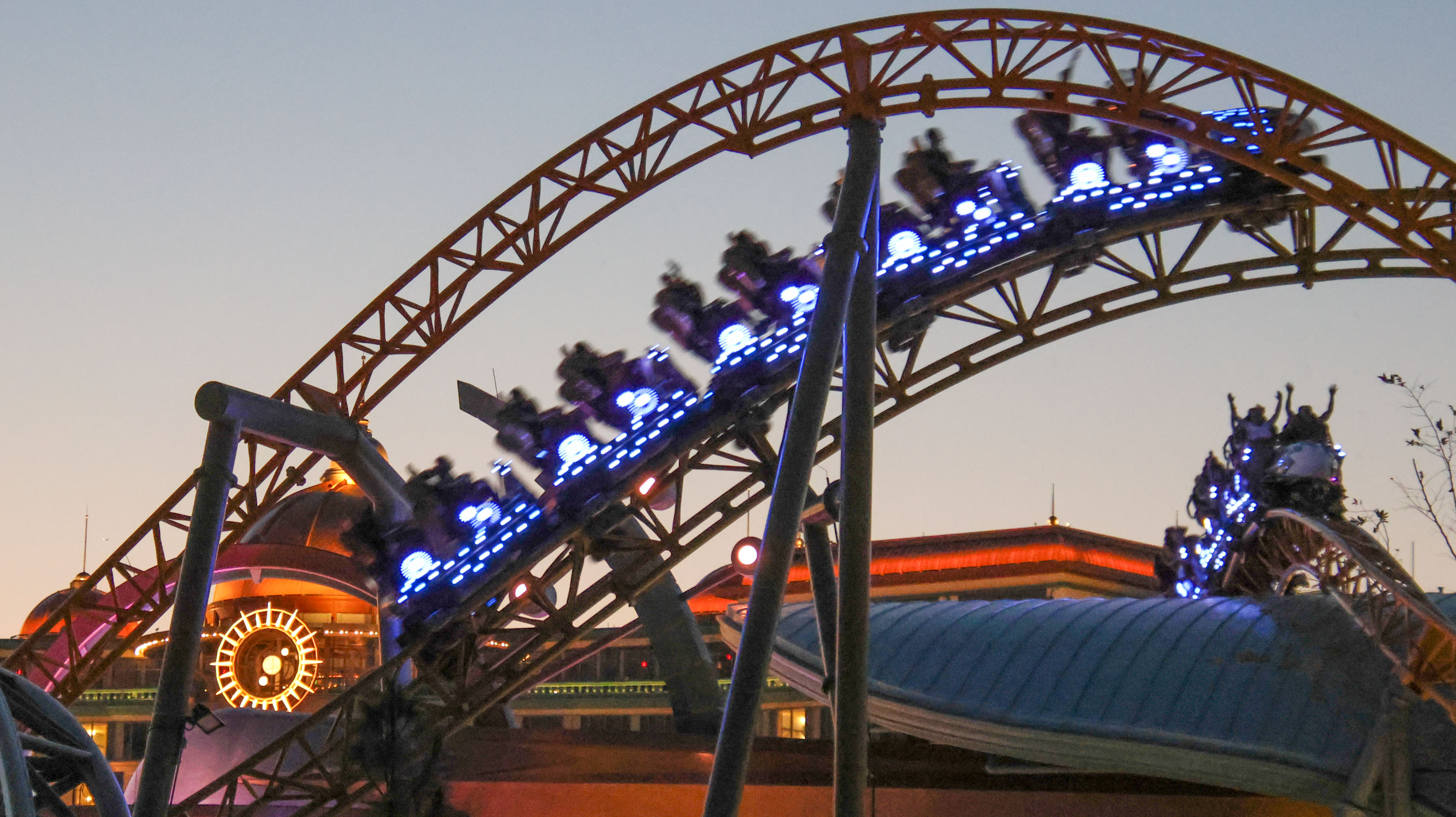
- Previously known as Starfall Racers

Universal Epic Universe
- Park section: Celestial Park
- Coordinates: 28.441446°N 81.446672°W
- Status: Operating
- Opening date: May 22, 2025

General statistics
- Type: Steel – Dueling – Launched
- Manufacturer: Mack Rides
- Designer: Universal Creative
- Lift/launch system: LSM launch
	Pulsar	Photon
Height	133 ft (40.5 m)	133 ft (40.5 m)
Length	5,000 ft (1,524.0 m)	5,000 ft (1,524.0 m)
Speed	62 mph (99.8 km/h)	62 mph (99.8 km/h)
Inversions	1	1
- Height restriction: 48 in (122 cm)
- Trains: 5 cars. Riders are arranged 2 across in 2 rows for a total of 20 riders per train.
- Website: Official website
- Universal Express available
- Stardust Racers at RCDB; Pictures of Stardust Racers at RCDB

Stardust Racers is a steel dual-tracked roller coaster located at Universal Epic Universe in Orlando, Florida, United States. Manufactured by Mack Rides, the dueling coaster officially opened to the public on May 22, 2025. It features multiple electromagnetic LSM launches, a maximum speed of 62 mph (100 km/h), and two 5,000-foot (1,500 m) tracks, which collectively make it one of the largest steel coasters in the United States.

Universal Orlando first unveiled the ride as Starfall Racers during an official announcement in January 2024. A trademark challenge forced Universal to rename it Stardust Racers in May 2024. In its inaugural season, the ride was well received and earned Amusement Today's Best New Roller Coaster award for 2025. In 2026, it ranked tenth among all steel coasters worldwide in the publication's Golden Ticket Awards.

== History ==
=== Development and construction ===
Universal Epic Universe was first announced on August 1, 2019, as a new third gate theme park that would double Universal Orlando's footprint. Although ride and attraction details were not divulged at the time, a large dueling coaster was predominantly visible in concept artwork. German roller coaster manufacturer Mack Rides subsequently patented a new ride inversion design in the fall, where twin tracks twisted over one another while rising and falling from a peak. This element would later become known as the Celestial Spin.

Epic Universe was originally scheduled to open in 2023, but parent company Comcast announced in April 2020 that construction would be delayed as a result of the COVID-19 pandemic. Roland Mack, Europa Park co-founder and former Mack Rides managing director, stated in September 2020 that Universal had cancelled his company's order for "the largest roller coaster in the world", valued over 20 million euros. After construction on Epic Universe resumed in March 2021, Roland confirmed that Universal had renewed the previous contract, which had been amended to include a second coaster project.

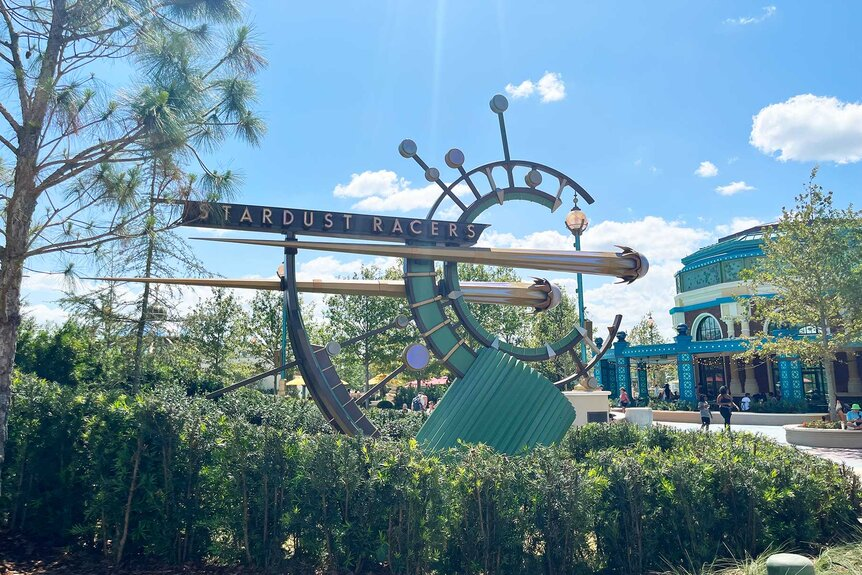
Entrance to Stardust Racers at Epic Universe

Track and supports for the attraction began arriving in August 2022. Construction oversaw groundwork and coaster installation taking place concurrently, with each section being completed in phases. The first pieces were fitted in November 2022 with the initial launch tracks and maintenance bays, and the highlight Celestial Spin element was topped off in late May 2023. The remaining layout was completed the following month.

=== Announcement and opening ===
Universal City Studios LLC submitted a trademark application for "Starfall Racers" to the United States Patent and Trademark Office on March 7, 2023. On January 30, 2024, Universal Orlando formally shared details on Starfall Racers alongside Epic Universe and its central Celestial Park themed area. A wide variety of concept artwork on the ride and themed area were released to the public.

Following the announcement, the name was challenged by the Starfall Education Foundation for "brand misappropriation toward children". As a result, Universal resorted to its backup trademark name and renamed the roller coaster "Stardust Racers" in May 2024.

In August 2024, Universal released additional details on the new dueling coaster, including footage of its Celestial Spin element and a detailed first look at the ride vehicles. The coaster was completed on schedule and opened with the park on May 22, 2025.

== Ride description ==
The ride's themed backstory focuses on the Celestians, residents of Celestial Park, who have learned to capture comets from the stars and ride them. This was how they traveled to different worlds before the portal system was invented. They are allowing visitors to race on two of these comets, Pulsar (Green) and Photon (Yellow), to see which is the fastest.

=== Characteristics ===
Each side of Stardust Racers stands 133 feet (41 m) tall, covers around 5,000 feet (1,500 m) of track, and reaches a top speed of 62 mph (100 km/h). The maximum height is reached during the attraction's signature Celestial Spin element, where the tracks invert around each other while rising and falling. The ride's maximum speed is attained during the second electromagnetic LSM launch. The supports are painted copper, and each side has its own track color, yellow and green.

Stardust Racers runs with up to four trains on each track. Each train features onboard audio and is made up of five cars, where riders sit in two rows of two, for a total of twenty passengers. The trains are lit at night instead of the track and supports, designed to make the illuminated ride vehicles appear as comets in the night sky. A flux capacitor from the Back to the Future film series is attached to the back of the trains, implying that Dr. Emmett Brown was responsible for making the comets stable enough to race.

=== Layout ===
After dispatch, each train makes a 180-degree turn inward. The track called Photon (painted yellow) turns right, while the other track called Pulsar (painted green) turns left to travel underneath the station and into the first launch. Upon exiting the launch, the train ascends a top hat element and traverses downward into a turn and bunny hill. Next, it dives into a sharp turn invoking a near miss element.

Each train rises back up and proceeds to the second launch, where the ride's top speed of 62 mph (100 km/h) is reached. This leads to the ride's climax Celestial Spin element, a 133-foot-tall (41 m) inversion where the Pulsar side traverses a zero-g roll while the Photon side traverses a downward barrel roll. The trains then proceed to an overbanked turn to the right where the ride photo is taken, followed by a series of turns and hills before reaching the final brake run and returning to the station.

== Reception ==
Stardust Racers received positive reviews during its inaugural season. Jessica Rawden of CinemaBlend described the ride experience as one of the best among Universal Orlando coasters, next to VelociCoaster, and said the green side of the dueling tracks is "loopier", noting that it is the "higher octane side". John Gregory of Theme Park Tribune stated that it was a "masterclass in airtime" and that the Celestial Spin dueling element "may be the best coaster element I’ve ever experienced". While he noted that the theming was light in comparison to Hagrid's Magical Creatures Motorbike Adventure or VelociCoaster, he emphasized that the illumination at night provided the "full experience", adding "the dueling coasters truly look like two comets dancing in a cosmic ballet".

Amusement Today awarded Stardust Racers Golden Ticket Award for Best New Roller Coaster in 2025. They said it defines the park's identity and called it "one of the most visually striking roller coasters ever built by Universal", noting its "seamless blend of speed and style, racing through a cratered landscape that glows at night". Golden Ticket also ranked Stardust Racers as its 17th and 10th top steel roller coaster worldwide in 2025 and 2026 respectively.

Golden Ticket Awards: Top steel Roller Coasters
Year									1998	1999
Ranking									–	–
Year	2000	2001	2002	2003	2004	2005	2006	2007	2008	2009
Ranking	–	–	–	–	–	–	–	–	–	–
Year	2010	2011	2012	2013	2014	2015	2016	2017	2018	2019
Ranking	–	–	–	–	–	–	–	–	–	–
Year	2020	2021	2022	2023	2024	2025	2026			
Ranking	N/A	–	–	–	–	17	10			

== Incidents ==
Stardust Racers was temporarily closed after a 32-year-old man, who used a wheelchair and had a spinal injury, died while riding on September 17, 2025. He was found "unresponsive after riding" according to a statement from Universal. An autopsy report listed "multiple blunt impact injuries" as the official cause of death, which they labeled as an accident." A lawyer representing the victim's family stated that the incident was not isolated, alleging that other riders have suffered similar injuries. A settlement between Universal and the victim's family was reached in December 2025.

Universal, Mack Rides, and the state of Florida inspected the roller coaster and found it to be safe and functioning properly. The ride reopened on October 4, 2025, with additional safety guide requirements for park guests.

In August 2026, a woman filed a lawsuit against Universal Orlando and roller coaster manufacturer Mack Rides regarding injuries to her son while riding Stardust Racers. The lawsuit alleges that on October 13, 2025, her son lost consciousness and sustained head, facial, orthopedic, and spinal injuries.

== See also ==
- Battlestar Galactica: Human vs. Cylon – a similar style ride at Universal Studios Singapore
- Dragon Challenge – a former dueling roller coaster Universal Islands of Adventure
