= VelociCoaster =

Roller coaster at Universal Islands of Adventure

Jurassic World VelociCoaster

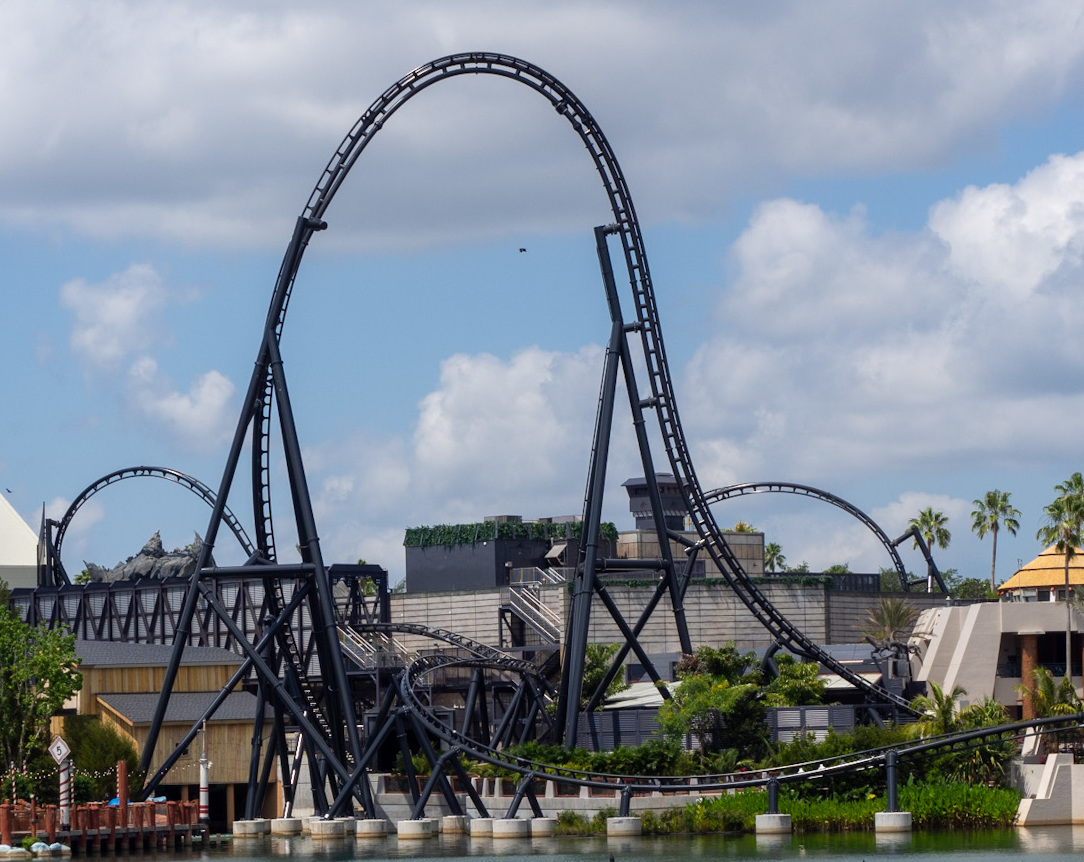
- VelociCoaster from across the lake

Universal Islands of Adventure
- Location: Universal Islands of Adventure
- Park section: Jurassic Park
- Coordinates: 28.47127°N 81.471999°W
- Status: Operating
- Soft opening date: May 7, 2021
- Opening date: June 10, 2021
- Replaced: Triceratops Encounter

General statistics
- Type: Steel – Launched
- Manufacturer: Intamin
- Designer: Universal Creative
- Model: LSM Launch Coaster
- Lift/launch system: LSM
- Height: 155 ft (47 m)
- Drop: 140 ft (43 m)
- Length: 4,700 ft (1,400 m)
- Speed: 70 mph (110 km/h)
- Inversions: 4
- Max vertical angle: 80°
- Height restriction: 51 in (130 cm)
- Trains: 4 trains with 6 cars; riders arranged 2 across in 2 rows for a total of 24 riders per train
- Theme: Velociraptor (Jurassic World)
- Website: Official website
- 1st Launch: 0 to 50 mph (0 to 80 km/h) in 2 seconds
- 2nd Launch: 40 to 70 mph (64 to 113 km/h) in 2.4 seconds
- Restraints: Lap bar
- Pre-show hosts: Claire Dearing; Owen Grady
- Universal Express available
- Must transfer from wheelchair
- Closed captioning available
- Jurassic World VelociCoaster at RCDB

Jurassic World VelociCoaster, or simply VelociCoaster, is a launched roller coaster at Universal Islands of Adventure in Orlando, Florida, United States. Manufactured by Intamin, the ride opened to the public on June 10, 2021. The attraction is themed around the Velociraptor dinosaurs as portrayed in the Jurassic World film franchise. Located in the Islands of Adventure's Jurassic Park area, VelociCoaster was built on the site of the former Triceratops Encounter attraction. It features two high-speed launches powered by linear synchronous motors, a signature 155-foot-tall (47 m) top hat, four inversions, and a maximum speed of 70 mph (110 km/h).

== History ==
=== Construction ===
Universal Orlando hired Intamin to construct a new ride to replace the inactive Triceratops Encounter attraction, which had been closed for nearly a decade. The initiative, dubbed "Project 791" in permits filed by the park, would be the third collaboration between both parties following Harry Potter and the Escape from Gringotts (2014) and Hagrid's Magical Creatures Motorbike Adventure (2019). The permits filed in 2018 called for the demolition and site clearing of Triceratops Encounter, signaling to the public that a new attraction may be coming. Construction walls were erected in January 2019, and project documents were leaked online shortly after showing an overhead layout of a proposed roller coaster project.

Construction entered full swing by the spring of 2019, with the removal of Triceratops Encounter and the clearing of unused land in and around the park's existing Discovery Centre building. A bridge connecting The Lost Continent and Jurassic Park areas was also razed. In June 2019, the first pieces of track for the unannounced coaster were delivered and stored offsite. In July 2019, Universal Parks & Resorts filed a trademark with the United States Patent and Trademark Office for the name "VelociCoaster", which fans quickly deduced to be the name of the new unannounced coaster.

In early 2020, following months of concrete groundwork and further preparation, the extensive collection of track and supports already in storage were delivered to the construction site and installed. Construction was temporarily halted during the initial COVID-19 lockdown and later resumed at a rapid pace. Much of the construction was completed by the time Universal Orlando Resort was cleared to reopen in June 2020, attracting the unreserved attention of park guests and local media. The 155-foot (47 m) tall top hat element, the highest point of the ride, was topped out and completed the following month in early July.

=== Announcement and further preparation ===
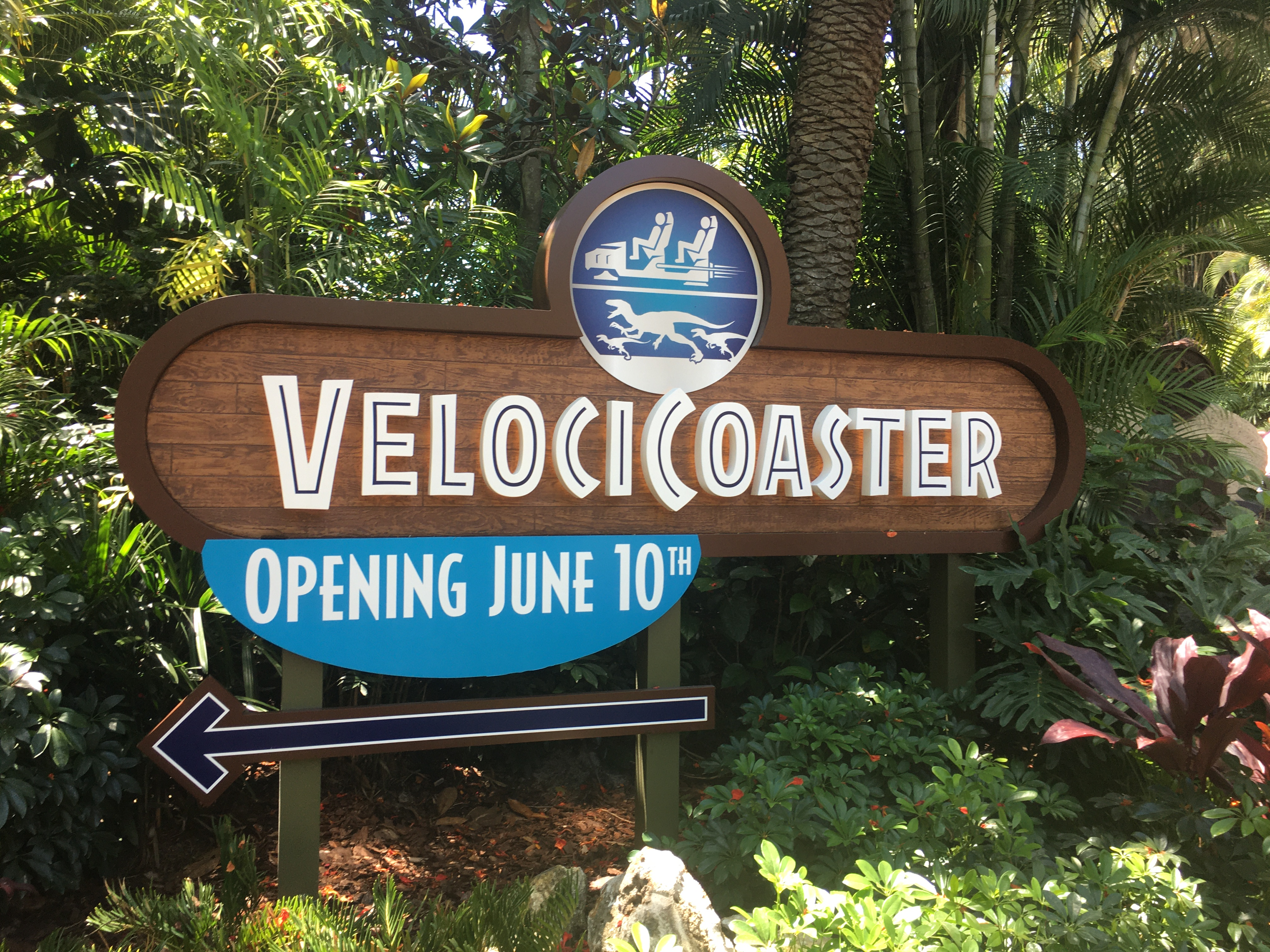
Sign for the VelociCoaster, displaying the June 10 opening date

Universal initially declined to acknowledge that it was constructing a roller coaster, even after the ride had been topped out. On September 28, 2020, Universal formally announced the new ride as Jurassic World VelociCoaster, billing it as a "new species of roller coaster" and the tallest and fastest launch coaster in Florida. It was confirmed that the ride would feature twelve airtime moments, a 100-foot-long (30 m) zero-g stall, and a barrel roll over the lagoon for its finale.

Universal continued to release new information on VelociCoaster before the ride's 2021 scheduled opening. In December 2020, closeups of the trains were published, and early testing was underway. In January 2021, VelociCoaster hosted its first riders. More details surrounding the specs of the new coaster were released shortly after, including its 140-foot (43 m) drop at an 80-degree angle and the use of a lap bar instead of an over-the-shoulder restraint. The first launch accelerates guests from 0 to 50 mph (0 to 80 km/h) in 2 seconds, and the second one adds an acceleration boost from 40 to 70 mph (64 to 113 km/h) in 2.4 seconds.

Construction walls around the construction area were taken down in late February 2021, giving park guests better views of the new coaster. In April 2021, VelociCoaster's official opening date was announced. A soft opening to press and enthusiasts was hosted on May 7, 2021, and the ride was well-received. An official on-ride point-of-view video was released to the public on May 28. The attraction formally opened on June 10, 2021, with guests waiting in the queue for up to four hours. It became the fastest roller coaster at any Universal park upon opening, beating The Incredible Hulk Coaster (1999).

== Ride experience ==
=== Queue ===
The queue begins outside the lower floor on the left side of the Discovery Center. Two raptor statues are on display at the entrance. The paddock features glowing neon lights, and the coaster can be occasionally seen launching outside the building. For lines that stretch outdoor, there is an extended queue area that provides close-up views of the coaster's track, as well as shade and cooling fans. Inside, guests see more raptor statues and eventually move into a room with six windows overlooking the ride track. A video special effect is used to show a Velociraptor chasing each coaster train as it passes by. Inside one of the windows, guests can find a clipboard and a radar gun. In another is a cup with permanent ripples referencing the first Jurassic Park film. Guests in the standby line then enter a room with a video presentation by Dr. Henry Wu. There are a few lockers with various items, such as football equipment, raptor toys, and books. After the room with Dr. Wu, the standby line rejoins the Express Pass line in an examination room where two animatronic Velociraptors are caged and muzzled.

The examination room is followed by the lockers area, where guests can secure loose articles. The lockers have a two-way design, in which a door swings open on one side to insert belongings, and then swings open on the other side as guests exit the ride and retrieve them. In addition, a family room can be found in this area, where guests can wait here while others ride the coaster. The family room contains a TV monitor that plays the Jurassic World Camp Cretaceous series by Netflix. VelociCoaster is one of the three roller coasters at Universal Orlando to have metal detectors, with the others being The Incredible Hulk Coaster and Stardust Racers. Prior to reaching the metal detectors, there are advertisement posters of fictional Jurassic World attractions, such as Gyrosphere Valley, T-Rex Kingdom, and the Mosasaurus show. The posters also show attractions that exist at Islands of Adventure, such as Jurassic Park: River Adventure. After passing the metal detectors, guests walk up a flight of stairs into a final pre-show room displaying a video with Claire Dearing and Owen Grady, portrayed by Bryce Dallas Howard and Chris Pratt, respectively, reprising their roles from the Jurassic World film series. In the video, Grady rebukes the idea of taking a ride on VelociCoaster and tries to discourage guests as well. The room features various Jurassic World props on display including zappers, net guns, a waiver and a dino tracker. Guests then reach the station, where they board the train.

=== Layout ===
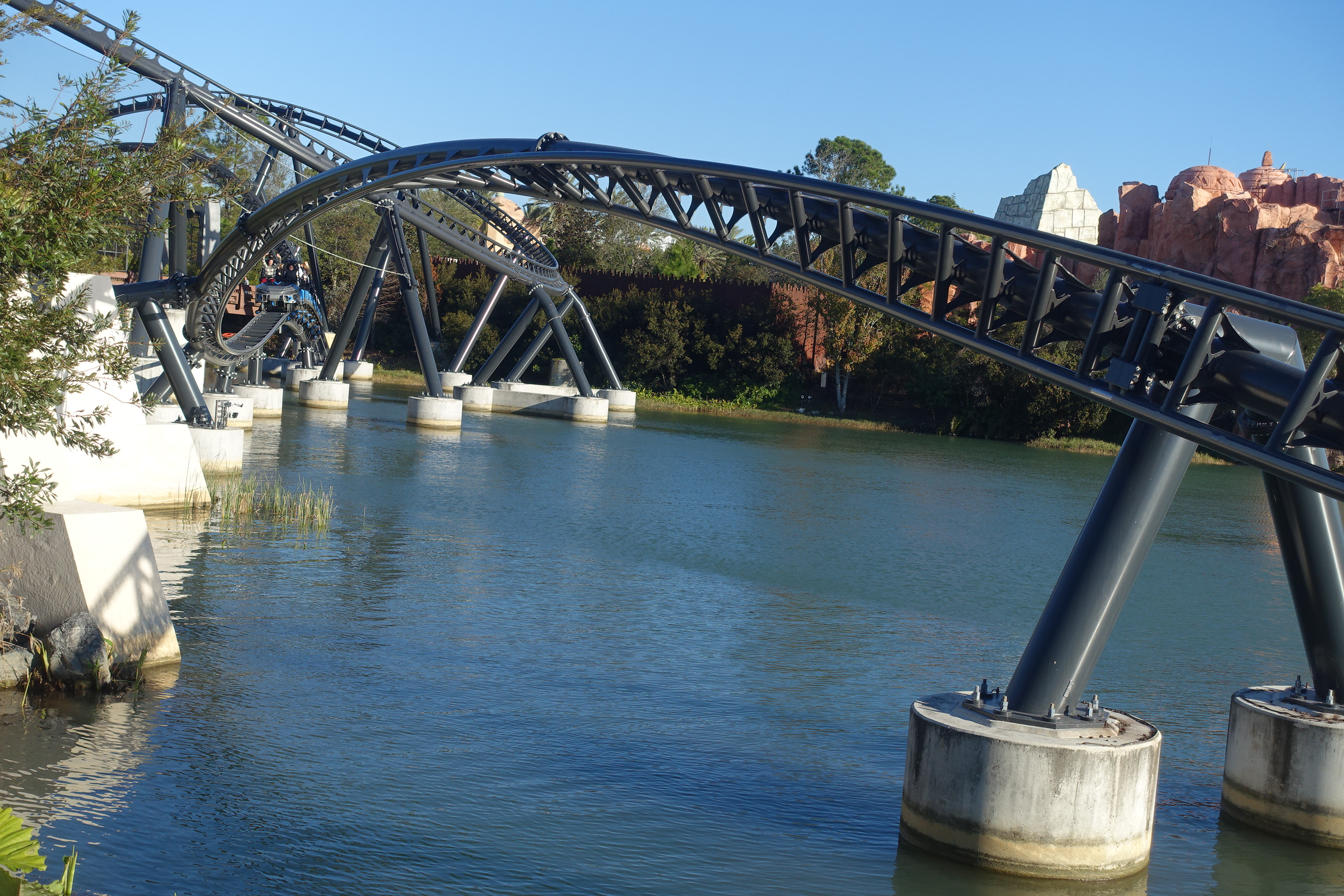
The barrel roll above water

The loading area is located to the west of the queue. After exiting the station, riders take an S-turn into the pre-launch sequence, where Owen warns the riders one last time. Four Velociraptors can be seen in their cages on either side of the track; Blue and Delta are caged on the left, and Echo and Charlie are caged on the right. The boosters power up as the Velociraptors seemingly escape, and riders are launched from 0 to 50 mph (0 to 80 km/h) in 2 seconds. Immediately following the launch track, the train passes through an Immelmann loop and dives down and back up through a dive loop. Intricate rock work and foliage surrounds the track as trains pass through. The train turns to the left as it dives under itself and snaps back to the right, where the on-ride camera is located. The train heads through an overbanked turn and rises up into an off-axis airtime hill reaching a turnaround that rises through the rock work. This is followed by a downward S-bend, where the train passes Blue and Charlie, two of the four Velociraptors seen on the ride.

The train goes through another overbanked turn and hits a sharp S-bend, passing Delta and Echo. Following a slow outward-banked hill, the ride turns right and enters a tunnel and its second launch, propelling riders to 70 mph (110 km/h) in 2.4 seconds. The launch sends the train into a steep climb up to its tallest point, a 155-foot-tall (47 m) top hat. The train then plummets down 140 feet (43 m) at an 80-degree angle, turning to the right and snapping back to the left to complete the 100-foot (30 m) long zero-g stall. An incline follows taking the train into a 125-degree overbanked turn, leading into a banked airtime hill, a 133-degree overbanked turn, and a speed hill. Riders then reach the coaster's signature element, a heartline roll dubbed the "Mosasaurus Roll", which inverts riders over water at 53 mph (85 km/h). An off-axis airtime hill is the last element before the train reaches the brake run. Owen thanks riders as they return but is abruptly summoned to tend to a situation over at River Adventure.

== Reception ==
Golden Ticket Awards: Top steel Roller Coasters
Year									1998	1999
Ranking									–	–
Year	2000	2001	2002	2003	2004	2005	2006	2007	2008	2009
Ranking	–	–	–	–	–	–	–	–	–	–
Year	2010	2011	2012	2013	2014	2015	2016	2017	2018	2019
Ranking	–	–	–	–	–	–	–	–	–	–
Year	2020	2021	2022	2023	2024	2025	2026			
Ranking	N/A	18	5	3	2	2	–			

Category	Ranking	Ref.
Golden Ticket Award for Best New Roller Coaster of 2020/21	1	
Golden Ticket Award for Best New Attraction Installation of 2021	2	
