= Voltron Nevera =

Multi-Launch roller coaster at Europa-Park

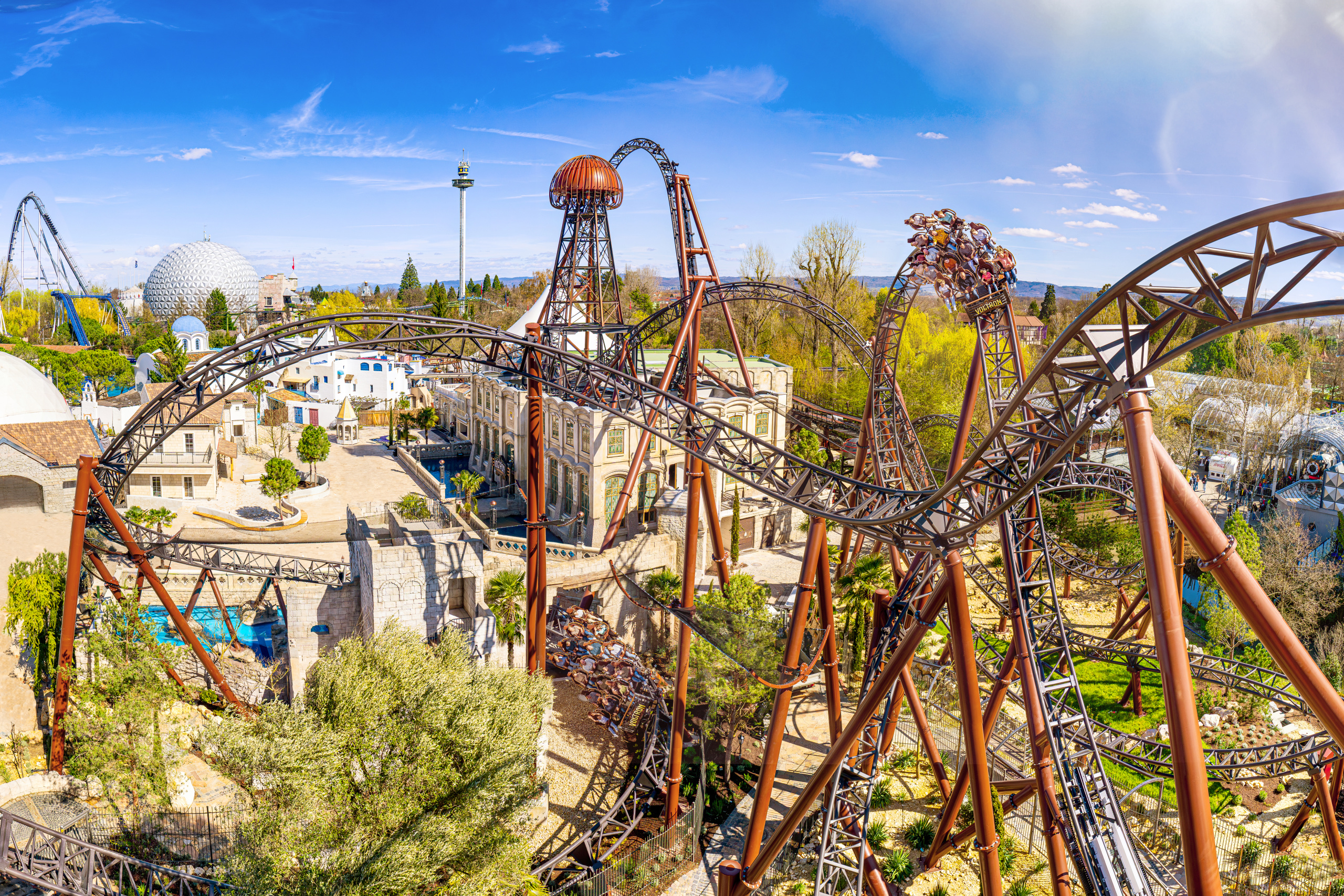
- Voltron Nevera in the Croatian themed area

Europa-Park
- Location: Europa-Park
- Park section: Croatia
- Coordinates: 48.2659638°N 7.7194092°E
- Status: Operating
- Opening date: 26 April 2024 (2 years ago)

General statistics
- Type: Steel – Launched
- Manufacturer: Mack Rides
- Model: Stryker Coaster
- Lift/launch system: LSM launch (multiple)
- Height: 106.6 ft (32.5 m)
- Length: 4,544.0 ft (1,385.0 m)
- Speed: 62 mph (100 km/h)
- Inversions: 7
- Max vertical angle: 95°
- Capacity: 1,600 riders per hour
- Height restriction: 130 cm (4 ft 3 in)
- Trains: 7 trains with 4 cars; riders arranged 4 across in a single row for a total of 16 riders per train
- Website: Official website
- Single rider line available
- Voltron Nevera at RCDB

Voltron Nevera (or simply Voltron) is a multi-launch roller coaster at Europa-Park in Rust, Germany. The ride opened to the public on 26 April 2024 as part of a new Croatian-themed area in the park. Voltron Nevera was manufactured by Mack Rides at their factory in Waldkirch, Baden-Württemberg. Its theme is based around Nikola Tesla's experiments with electricity, mainly around Wardenclyffe Towers that are transporting people charged up with energy from one point to another and back. It is sponsored by automotive manufacturer Rimac Automobili, as announced at the coaster's name-reveal ceremony. Voltron Nevera won Best New Roller Coaster at the 2024 Golden Ticket Awards presented by Amusement Today.

== Layout ==
Voltron Nevera is a combination of dark ride and launched roller coaster. Riders board the trains while they slowly travel forward on a conveyor system. Once guests have boarded, the train proceeds through a dark ride section within a themed workshop. The train then pauses momentarily while the tower "energises", and the track section below vibrates and bounces. The train is then accelerated forward and up, into a beyond-vertical (105°) launch. This launch is also the steepest launch of any rollercoaster in the world. There then follows various coaster elements, including a booster launch, a turntable, a reverse launch, Dive Loop, Top Hat, Immelmann Jr. Scorpion Tail, Zero-G Stall, two Corkscrews, ejector airtime, multi-pass/swing launch and more. Throughout the ride, the trains pass through the surrounding Croatian-themed landscapes, which contain ruins, rocks and a church tower.

== Construction ==
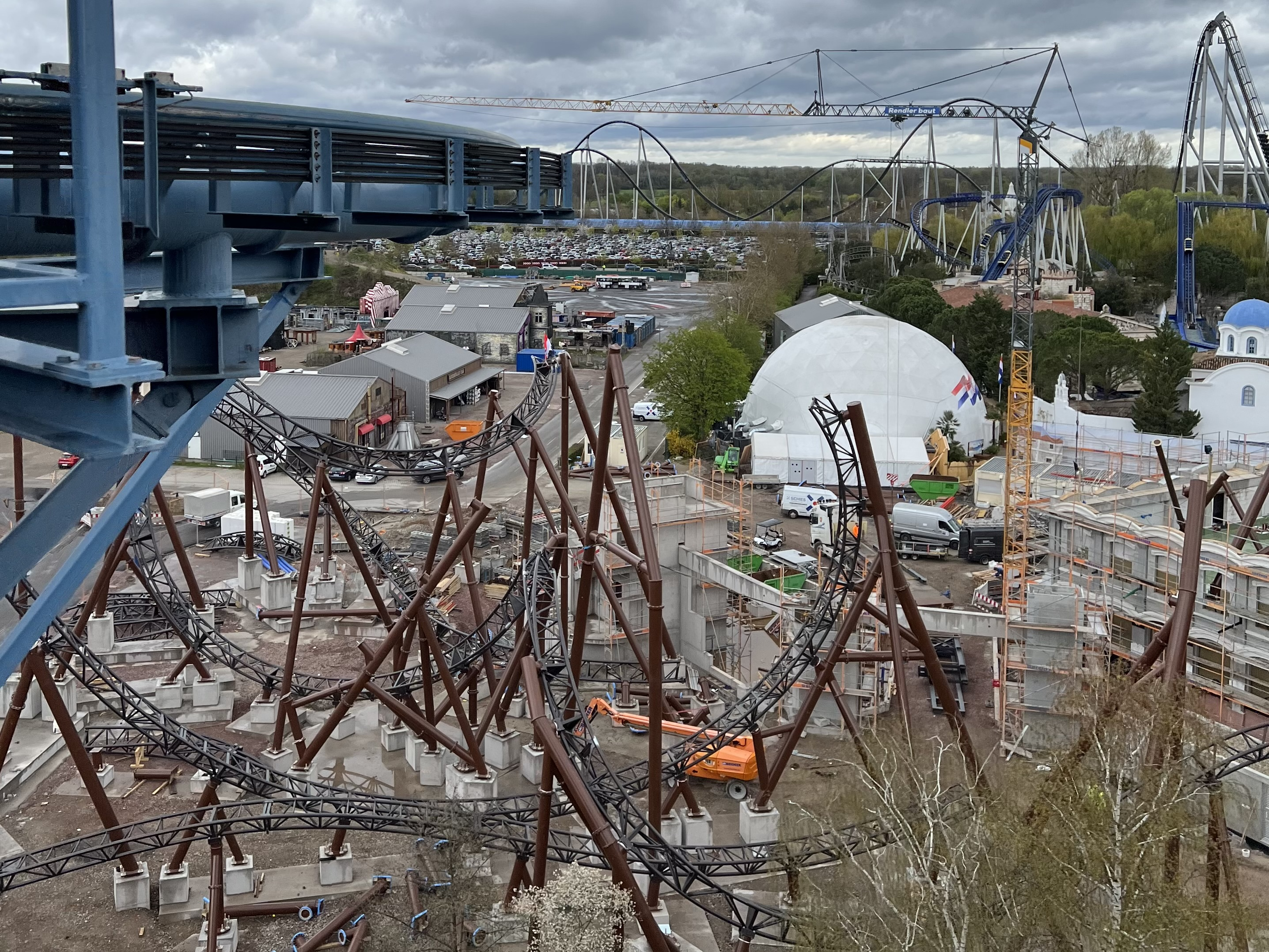
Voltron Nevera during construction, with incomplete track sections

Voltron Nevera opened as the first phase of a new Croatian-themed area in Europa-Park, located between the Greece- and Russia-themed areas. The site had previously been occupied by a satellite dish, which was demolished in February 2022 to allow for construction of the new themed area to begin. The park installed a preview centre beside the Greece-themed area, allowing visitors to observe a miniature model of the upcoming ride. The preview centre also included viewing windows which overlooked parts of the construction site. In April 2023, Europa-Park released an animated video render containing both on-ride and off-ride shots of the new coaster. The track was completed in May 2023. The first of the seven trains arrived in Europa-Park on 26 January 2024.

== Rankings ==
Golden Ticket Awards: Top steel Roller Coasters
Year									1998	1999
Ranking									–	–
Year	2000	2001	2002	2003	2004	2005	2006	2007	2008	2009
Ranking	–	–	–	–	–	–	–	–	–	–
Year	2010	2011	2012	2013	2014	2015	2016	2017	2018	2019
Ranking	–	–	–	–	–	–	–	–	–	–
Year	2020	2021	2022	2023	2024	2025	2026			
Ranking	N/A	–	–	–	11	9	9			
