= Copperhead Strike =

Launched roller coaster at Carowinds

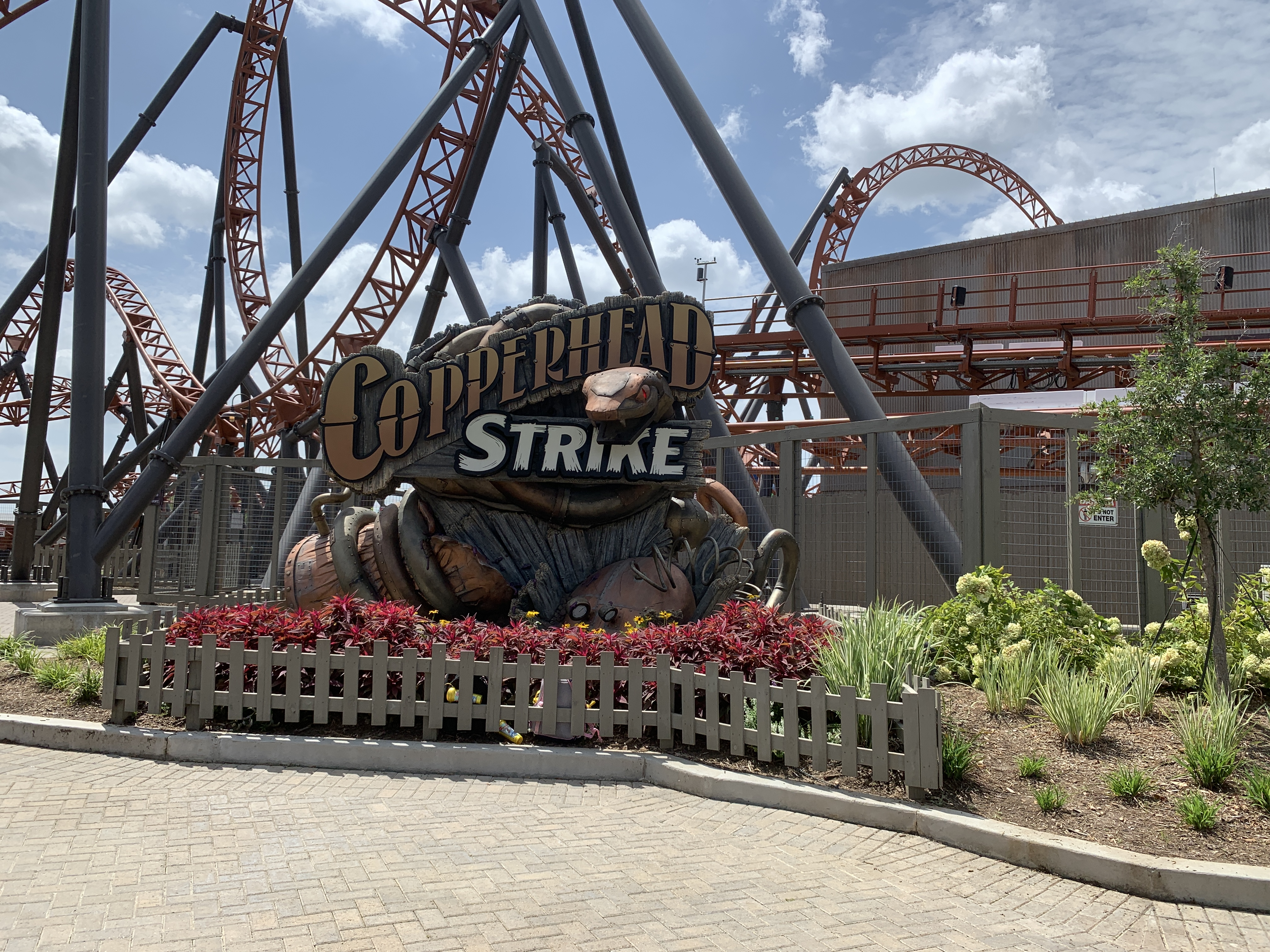

Carowinds
- Location: Carowinds
- Park section: Blue Ridge Junction
- Coordinates: 35.1011°N 80.9426°W
- Status: Operating
- Soft opening date: March 21, 2019
- Opening date: March 23, 2019
- Cost: $26,000,000
- Replaced: Whitewater Falls; Sand Dune Lagoon

General statistics
- Type: Steel – Launched
- Manufacturer: Mack Rides
- Model: Launch Coaster
- Lift/launch system: LSM launch
- Height: 82 ft (25 m)
- Length: 3,255 ft (992 m)
- Speed: 50 mph (80 km/h)
- Inversions: 5
- Duration: 2:24
- Capacity: 1,200 riders per hour
- Acceleration: 0 to 42 mph (0 to 68 km/h) in 2.5 seconds
- Height restriction: 52 in (132 cm)
- Trains: 3 trains with 4 cars. Riders are arranged 2 across in 2 rows for a total of 16 riders per train.
- Fast Lane available
- Copperhead Strike at RCDB

Copperhead Strike is a double launched roller coaster at Carowinds in Charlotte, North Carolina. Manufactured by Mack Rides, the ride debuted to the public on March 23, 2019. It opened as the headlining attraction of a new themed area, Blue Ridge Junction, which is located on the South Carolina side of the park. The ride is the first multi-launched roller coaster to open at the park, and the second launched coaster after White Lightnin' (now Golden Loop at Gold Reef City). Carowinds held a private event for media and special guests on March 21, 2019.

== History ==
Whitewater Falls, a Hopkins Rides shoot-the-chutes water attraction opened in 1988, closed at the end of the 2016 season. No official reasoning was given by the park for the closure of the ride, and the ride remained standing but not operating throughout the 2017 season until it was removed. In 2018, Carowinds began teasing a new attraction for the area formerly home to Whitewater Falls. On August 30, 2018, Carowinds officially announced Copperhead Strike, along with its accompanying area, becoming one of the largest investments in the park's history. On October 17, 2018, construction of the ride's vertical loop and queue area were taking shape. The roller coaster opened to the public on March 23, 2019.

== Ride experience ==
The ride starts with a slow heartline roll out of the station (an element sometimes referred to as a jojo roll) before a right hand turn into Granny Byrd's shed. After a show scene in the building, riders are launched from 0 to 42 mph (68 km/h) out of the shed into the first of two vertical loops. They then careen into an airtime hill and a fast-paced corkscrew, before hitting a turnaround and jumping into the next launch, which is situated over an airtime hill. The launch boosts the speed from 35 to 50 mph (56 to 80 km/h), and sends riders into an elevated cutback. The ride then travels through the second vertical loop and navigates several low-to-the-ground turns. The train ascends one last airtime hill before hitting the final brake run and returning to the station.

== Characteristics ==
=== Trains ===
Copperhead Strike features three trains, each possessing 4 cars that seat 4 riders in 2 rows, allowing 16 riders per train. Each seat uses an individual lap bar that is pulled down from above the riders' heads as well as a seat belt that rests between their legs and buckles to the restraint.

The front of each train is designed to look like a car, and bears striking resemblance to the 1939 Ford DeLuxe Convertible Coupe. This design features silver text on the front car that reads "Copperhead Strike", and similar text on the trunk-like design of the rear car that reads "Carowinds".

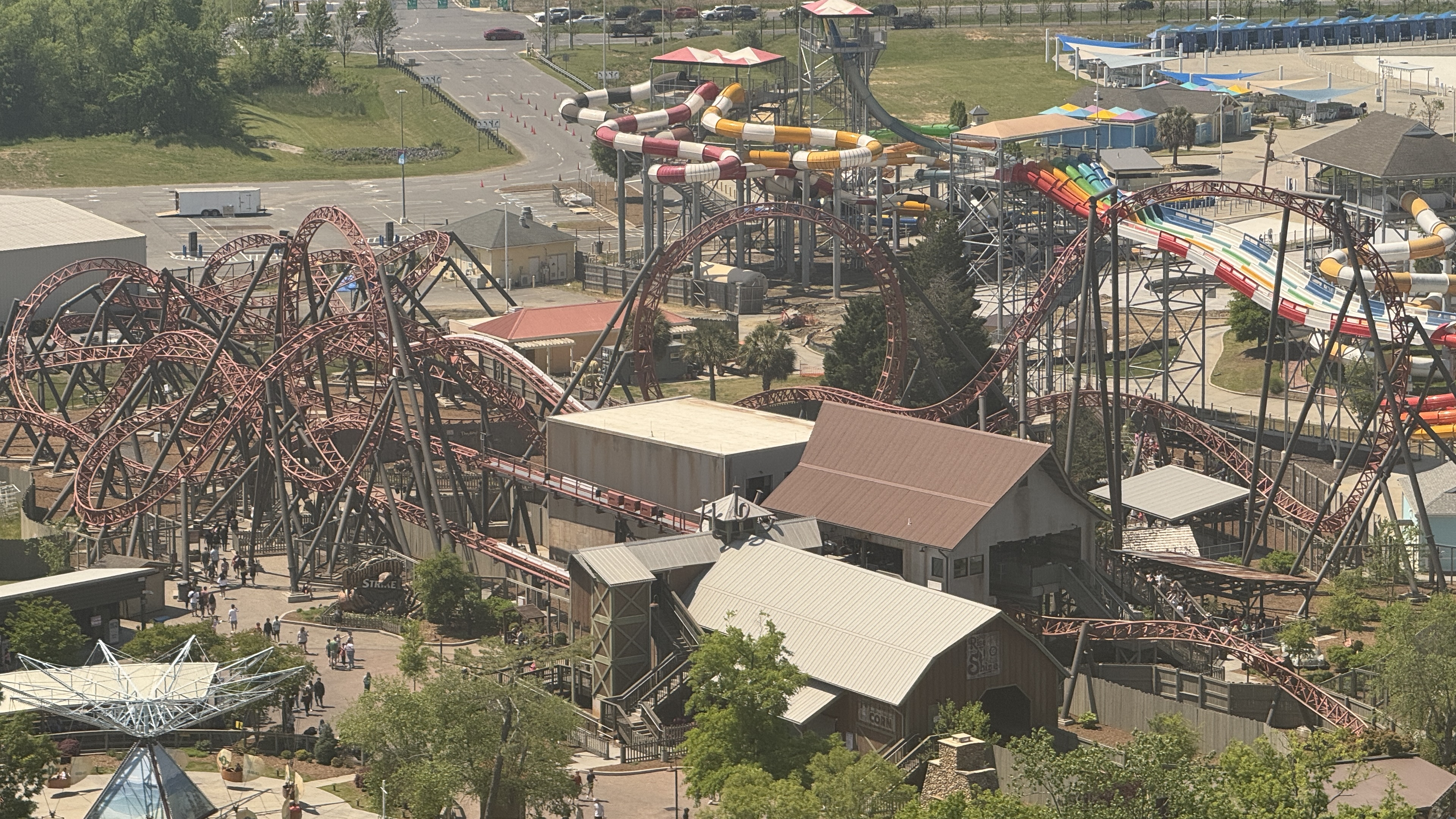
A View of Copperhead Strike from Carolina Skytower

=== Theme ===
Incorporated into the new area known as Blue Ridge Junction, the ride places guests in the shoes of visitors to old Granny Byrd's farmhouse on the edge of town. Granny has been making her prize-winning jam for over 40 years, but the farm is filled with signs warning trespassers to leave the property and look out for snakes.

The queue has guests walk through pathways surrounded by antique cars and shipping crates that feature "Byrd's Farm" branding. As the ride begins, riders happen upon a secret moonshine still in Granny's shed and must flee when she threatens to come after them.

== Incidents ==
On August 18, 2019, a guest was taken to the hospital after receiving a hand injury while riding. The ride was temporarily shut down following an investigation.

== Reception ==
Copperhead Strike was ranked in the Amusement Today's Golden Ticket Awards for best new roller coaster of 2019 in third place.

Golden Ticket Awards: Best New Roller Coaster for 2019
Ranking	3
