= ArieForce One =

Steel roller coaster at Fun Spot America Atlanta

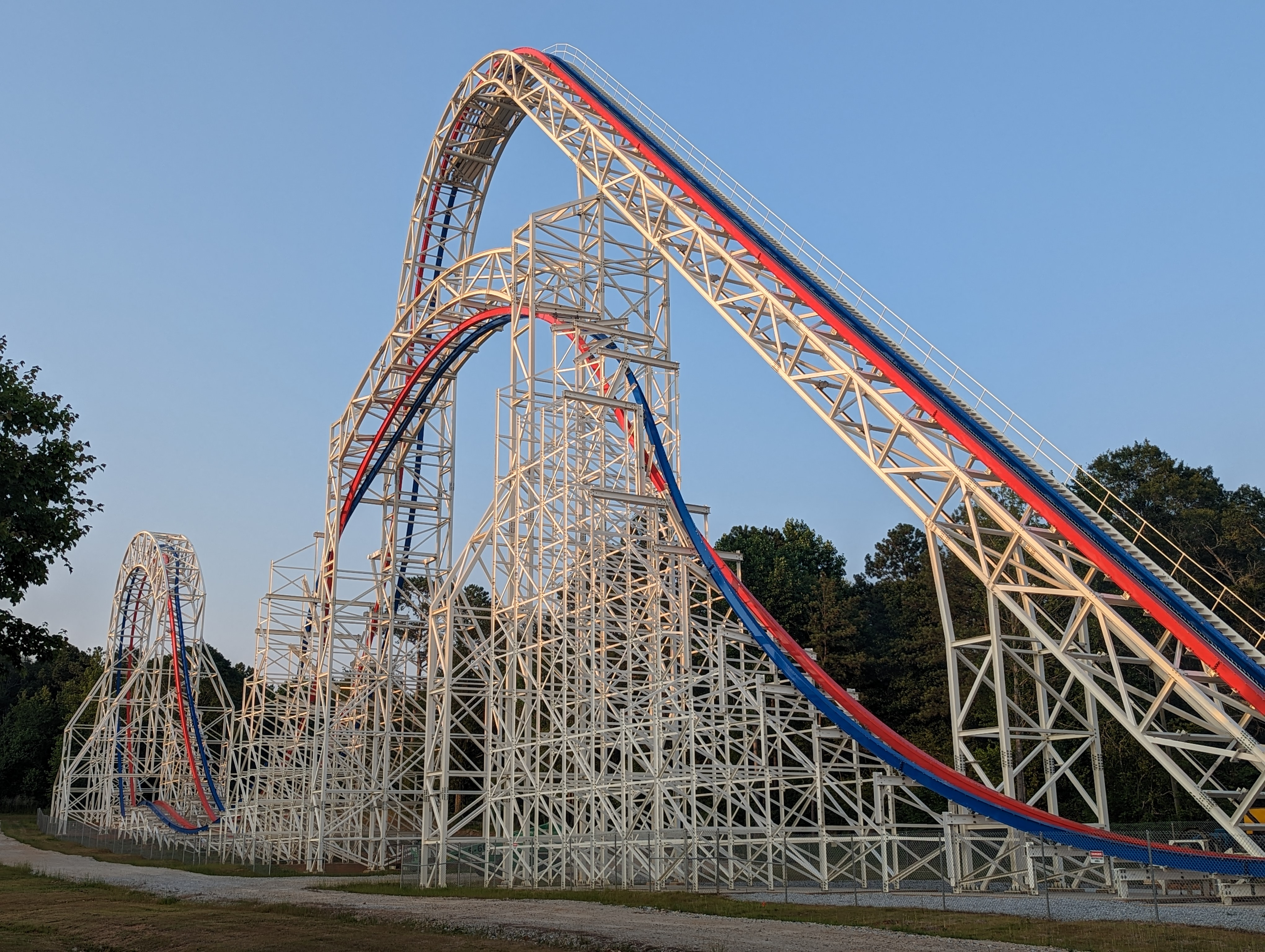

Fun Spot America Atlanta
- Location: Fun Spot America Atlanta
- Coordinates: 33.4973°N 84.4287°W
- Status: Closed
- Opening date: March 31, 2023
- Closing date: August 2, 2026
- Cost: $13,000,000 USD

General statistics
- Type: Steel
- Manufacturer: Rocky Mountain Construction
- Designer: Joe Draves
- Model: I-Box
- Track layout: Out and back
- Lift/launch system: Chain lift hill
- Height: 154 ft (47 m)
- Drop: 146 ft (45 m)
- Length: 3,400 ft (1,000 m)
- Speed: 64 mph (103 km/h)
- Inversions: 4
- Duration: 1:40
- Max vertical angle: 83°
- Capacity: 900 riders per hour
- G-force: 3.75
- Height restriction: 48 in (122 cm)
- Trains: 2 trains with 5 cars; riders arranged 2 across in 2 rows for a total of 20 riders per train
- Website: Official website
- ArieForce One at RCDB

Video

ArieForce One is a steel roller coaster formerly located at Fun Spot America Atlanta in Fayetteville, Georgia, United States. Manufactured by Rocky Mountain Construction, the ride was first announced by representatives of the Fun Spot America chain in May 2021, and the coaster was formally unveiled at the IAAPA Orlando Expo on November 16, 2021. At an accumulated cost of $18 million, ArieForce One represented the single largest investment on any ride in Fun Spot America's history. ArieForce One officially opened to the public on March 31, 2023.

On August 2, 2026, Fun Spot America Atlanta, including ArieForce One, closed permanently to guests. Six Flags acquired the coaster the following month, planning to reopen it at Six Flags Magic Mountain in 2028.

== History ==
=== Background ===
Fun Junction USA originally opened as Dixieland Fun Park in 1990 with go-kart tracks, batting cages, and a miniature golf course. Management eventually added a small selection of rides over the years, including the Hurricane coaster in 2007. In July 2017, Florida-based Fun Spot America Theme Parks announced the acquisition of Fun Junction USA as their first property outside of the state, with plans to roll out new attractions and branding. Chief among these investments was a new go-kart track for the 2018 season; Fun Spot America CEO John Arie Jr. hinted at a signature new coaster to eventually be built at the park.

=== Announcement ===
On May 25, 2021, Fun Spot America Atlanta announced that they had selected Idaho-based Rocky Mountain Construction (RMC) to construct a major new steel coaster for the 2022 season. Management attempted to secure a naming rights deal with the Atlanta Hawks professional basketball team, although such efforts fell through the following month. Fun Spot America Theme Parks subsequently trademarked the name "Arie Force One" on June 11, 2021.

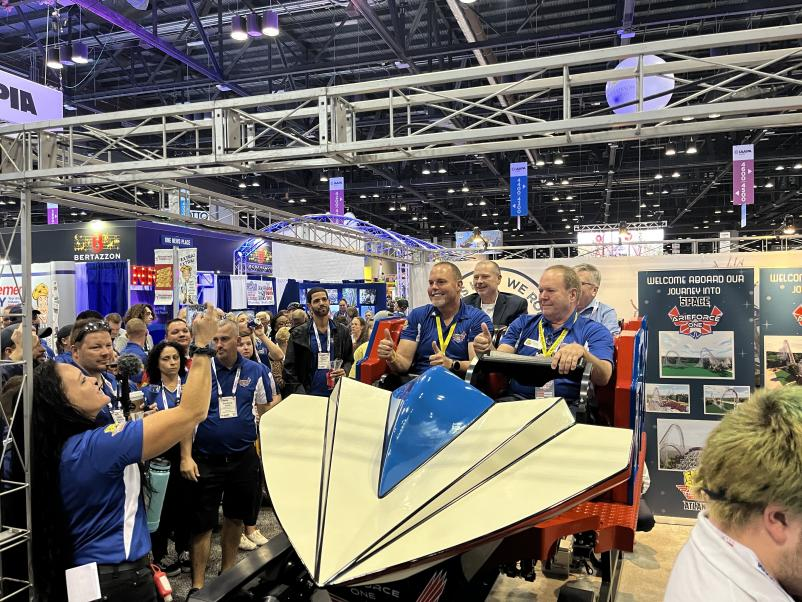
ArieForce One lead train during unveiling at the IAAPA Expo Orlando 2021

Throughout the summer, Fun Spot social media accounts systematically released conceptual renderings of the coaster. ArieForce One was officially unveiled on November 16, 2021, at the IAAPA Expo in Orlando, Florida. The coaster train's lead car was also unveiled that day at RMC's event booth, and was kept on display at Fun Spot Orlando for a few months before moving to Atlanta. Budgeted at $13 million at the time, the coaster represented the single largest investment ever put into a Fun Spot park. An animated on-ride point-of-view video was released on Christmas Day.

=== Construction ===
Work on ArieForce One was marred by serious delays, with progress bogged down by supply chain bottlenecks, zoning issues with Fayette County, and a modest construction crew. The issues ultimately pushed back ArieForce One's scheduled opening into 2023. In August 2022, John Arie Jr. stated that "[the] project has been delayed by about eight months. We have had to invest $5 million more into property changes to satisfy the county". Fayette County officials ordered the park to construct a new parking lot and more storm drainage, which required the removal of their miniature golf courses. As stated by Arie Jr.: "Basically, we had to remove one income source to build another".

Steel first began arriving for the coaster in late 2021. Fun Spot America held ArieForce One's groundbreaking ceremony on January 6, 2022. The first pieces of the support structure were installed in February, with construction continuing up until the end of the year.

=== Closure and relocation ===
On June 25, 2026, Fun Spot America announced that its Atlanta location, along with ArieForce One, would permanently cease operations on August 2, 2026. Company CEO John Arie Jr. described the decision as "extremely difficult", citing the park's inability to sustain operations despite significant investments in new attractions. Daily operations continued through the closing date while the company provided transition assistance to employees. Their Orlando and Kissimmee parks were not affected by the closure.

The announcement raised uncertainty over the future of the coaster. Industry observers speculated that the roller coaster could be relocated to another amusement park, although the company had not announced any plans for the attraction at the time of the closure announcement.

On September 3, 2026, Fun Spot America announced that ArieForce One had been sold. Six Flags was revealed as the buyer the following week, announcing plans to retain the coaster's name and theming when it reopens at Magic Mountain in 2028.

== Ride experience ==
The outwards-banked airtime hill

Departing the station, the train traverses two bunny hops before ascending the 154-foot (47 m) tall lift hill at a 45° angle. Upon reaching its peak, the train plummets down a 146-foot (45 m) first drop at 83°, reaching top speeds of 64 mph (103 km/h). Riders rise into the coaster's first inversion, a dive loop (dubbed a Raven Truss Dive) that also serves as a turnaround. A speed hill directly proceeds, leading up into the second inversion, a zero-g stall underneath the lift hill. An outwards-banked airtime hill follows, redirecting the train 90° to the left. After traversing a double up, riders sharply drop into the third inversion, a tight barrel roll (formerly dubbed an "arcade roll" due to its placement over Fun Spot America Atlanta's arcade). The coaster twists through an off-axis hill, a right-hand turnaround, and a final zero-g roll. A second low hill leads riders into the coaster's finale, consisting of an extended quad-down. Riders pop up into the final brake run and proceed back to the station through a 90° right turn. One ride on ArieForce One was advertised to last 100 seconds.

== Characteristics ==
ArieForce One stands 154 feet (47 m) tall, 3,400 feet (1,000 m) long, and reaches a top speed of 64 mph (103 km/h) throughout the ride. The natural topography resulted in a total elevation change of 180 feet (55 m) throughout the ride layout at its original location. At Fun Spot America Atlanta, it ran two 5-car trains, each car of which seated riders in two rows of two, resulting in an occupancy of 20 passengers per train and an estimated hourly capacity of 900 people per hour. In terms of the layout, ArieForce One contains an 83° first drop and four inversions, including a headlining "Raven Truss Dive" and the largest zero-g stall in the United States. G-forces throughout the ride varied, with riders being subjected to vertical g-forces between 3.75 g and -1.0 g, as well as lateral forces of +/- 1.25 g.

=== Awards ===
ArieForce One received the 2023 Golden Ticket Award for Best New Attraction Installation from Amusement Today. It also ranked at position 25 for the world's best steel roller coasters its debut year.

Golden Ticket Awards: Top steel Roller Coasters
Year									1998	1999
Ranking									–	–
Year	2000	2001	2002	2003	2004	2005	2006	2007	2008	2009
Ranking	–	–	–	–	–	–	–	–	–	–
Year	2010	2011	2012	2013	2014	2015	2016	2017	2018	2019
Ranking	–	–	–	–	–	–	–	–	–	–
Year	2020	2021	2022	2023	2024	2025	2026			
Ranking	N/A	–	–	25	17	13	11			
