= Hagrid's Magical Creatures Motorbike Adventure =

Roller coaster at Islands of Adventure

Hagrid’s Magical Creatures Motorbike Adventure
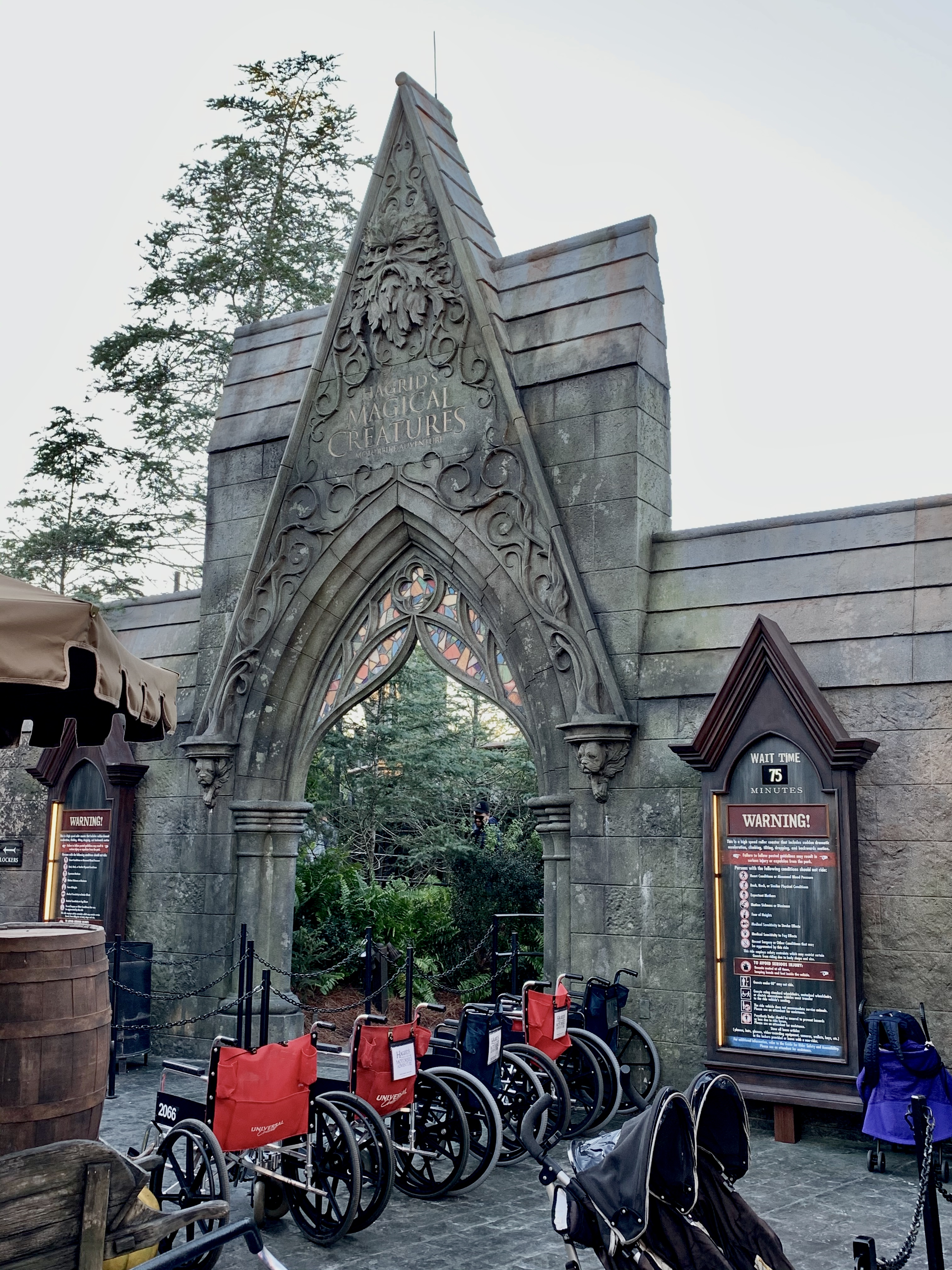
- Entrance to Hagrid's Magical Creatures Motorbike Adventure

Universal Islands of Adventure
- Location: Universal Islands of Adventure
- Park section: The Wizarding World of Harry Potter - Hogsmeade
- Coordinates: 28.473°N 81.473°W
- Status: Operating
- Soft opening date: June 11, 2019
- Opening date: June 13, 2019
- Cost: $300 million
- Replaced: Dragon Challenge

General statistics
- Type: Steel – Launched – Motorbike
- Manufacturer: Intamin
- Designer: Universal Creative
- Lift/launch system: LSM launch
- Height: 65 ft (20 m)
- Length: 5,053 ft (1,540 m)
- Speed: 50 mph (80 km/h)
- Inversions: 0
- Max vertical angle: 70°
- Capacity: 1,700 riders per hour
- Height restriction: 48 in (122 cm)
- Trains: 12 trains with 7 cars; riders arranged 2 across in a single row for a total of 14 riders per train
- Theme: Forbidden Forest (Harry Potter)
- Pre-show hosts: Rubeus Hagrid; Arthur Weasley
- Ride host: Rubeus Hagrid
- Launches: 7
- Must transfer from wheelchair
- Hagrid’s Magical Creatures Motorbike Adventure at RCDB

Hagrid's Magical Creatures Motorbike Adventure is a multiple-launch steel roller coaster located in The Wizarding World of Harry Potter – Hogsmeade section of Universal Islands of Adventure in Orlando, Florida. Manufactured by Intamin, the attraction opened to the public on June 13, 2019. The partially-enclosed motorbike coaster operates both indoor and outdoor, and it is the sixth Harry Potter-themed attraction created for the resort. Universal marketed the ride as "a highly-themed roller coaster" that focuses on "a different corner of the wizarding world".

Hagrid's Magical Creatures Motorbike Adventure replaced Dragon Challenge, a pair of intertwined inverted roller coasters that closed on September 4, 2017. It debuted with a record-breaking seven launches and reaches a maximum speed of 50 mph (80 km/h).

== History ==
Construction for Hagrid's Magical Creatures Motorbike Adventure began early January 2018, after land clearing was completed on the site that Dragon Challenge occupied previously. According to Alan Gilmore, art director of the Potter films and The Wizarding World of Harry Potter, over a thousand trees were planted to create the woodland that would set the theme of the Forbidden Forest.

The vertical spike began to rise in May 2018 and was completed a few weeks later. By August 2018, the castle structure was being built, while portions of the track were covered in white plastic wrap. In October 2018, the structure for Hagrid's Hut was being swiftly constructed, several trees were then planted in the surrounding area and later on, the track layout was completed. On December 17, 2018, the first 7-car train, which was completely covered, was installed on the track in anticipation of the testing phase.

On February 21, 2019, Universal Orlando announced more details about the coaster, including the name, Hagrid's Magical Creatures Motorbike Adventure, the ride vehicle design and an opening date for June 13, 2019. Ride testing began shortly after, on February 26, 2019. The Fluffy animatronic was completed early April 2019, around the same time final touches were made to the ride. It was confirmed that over twenty 13-inch cornish pixies would be found throughout the experience. Then, the unicorn animatronics were installed the following month. The attraction cost an estimated $300 million to construct and is one of the only coasters in the United States to feature a free-fall vertical drop.

Robbie Coltrane, who portrayed Rubeus Hagrid in the Harry Potter films and theme park attractions, reprised the role again for the roller coaster's pre-show and ride experience. Filming took place at Warner Bros. Studios Leavesden in 2018 with Coltrane and Mark Williams, who reprised the role of Arthur Weasley for the pre-show, as well; due to his declining health, Coltrane's performance was filmed face-and-head only. British actor Greg Draven undertook the on-screen performance for Hagrid's physical body, while Coltrane's face and head was digitally superimposed over Draven's body. Draven recalled Coltrane's approval, telling Draven his performance of Hagrid "did the character proud". This was Robbie Coltrane's final performance as Rubeus Hagrid before his death in 2022. The grand opening ceremony took place on June 11, 2019 with actors Evanna Lynch, Warwick Davis, Tom Felton, Rupert Grint and James and Oliver Phelps in attendance. Robbie Coltrane was unable to attend due to his health, however, he recorded video messages for the occasion.

Just a day after opening, a reserved virtual line system was implemented for the attraction, through Universal Orlando's mobile application, which was later phased out in favor of standby and single rider queues. Due to the coronavirus pandemic and its spread to Florida, the single rider line was made unavailable upon the resort's June 2020 reopening, but was reopened on June 15, 2021.

== Characteristics ==
Described as a "story coaster" by Universal, the attraction takes Muggles on a journey through the Forbidden Forest, coming face to face with magical creatures of the Wizarding World on Rubeus Hagrid's motorcycle such as Fluffy the three-headed dog, Cornish Pixies, Devil's Snare, a Centaur and a Blast-Ended Skrewt, a creature that was never featured in any of the Harry Potter films.

The attraction's vehicle is modeled after Hagrid's motorcycle, originally owned by Sirius Black in the book series, which appeared in the first and seventh films. There are seven rows on each train. Each row seats two passengers, one on the motorcycle itself and one in the sidecar. Each motorbike has speakers that provide theming to the attraction, similar to The Incredible Hulk Coaster and the former Hollywood Rip Ride Rockit, with a score inspired by the compositions of the Harry Potter films, especially those of John Williams.

Hagrid's Magical Creatures Motorbike Adventure features seven launches – the most of any roller coaster in the world at the time of opening – and reaches a maximum speed of 50 mph (80 km/h). It also features a unique free-fall vertical drop element, in which the track disconnects and drops with the train 17 feet (5.2 m), where it reconnects with another track below. The ride reaches its peak height when the train is catapulted 65 feet (20 m) into the air at a 70-degree angle.

== Ride experience ==
=== Queue ===
The exterior queue remains the same as Dragon Challenge, with the exception of the removal of the pennants in support of the Triwizard Tournament champions, and the broken-down Ford Anglia, which was incorporated to the ride. Muggles enter the queue by passing under the archway entrance, where they encounter signs along the way. A ring shaped path leads to a bridge over the exit pathway. Heading towards Flight of the Hippogriff, there is a flying horse made out of wood. Approaching a long switchback section, Muggles see huts, pumpkin patches and farming equipment. After passing a rose garden, Muggles cross the bridge and access a castle. Straight ahead, there is a vertical sculpture with a mermaid from the Black Lake surrounded by a couple of Grindylows. To the left of the sculpture is the castle entrance. Muggles enter a room with cages and several murals, such as Buckbeak and Ravenclaw. While walking down the hallway, there is a Dueling Club mural with ice and fire dragons, which pays tribute to Dragon Challenge. After this, Muggles head into a switchback room with a fireplace, pieces of wood, kitchenware and salamander footprints. This is followed by another storage room containing dragon eggs and more murals. After exiting the pre-show, Muggles pass along a study area with hourglasses, books, scales and other items. They can find several cards with creatures, including unicorns, cornish pixies, manticores and nifflers, as well as the Book of Monsters. Then, Muggles follow some dark hallways. Getting closer, they spot a test seat and a screen that shows safety instructions. After another switchback area, Muggles enter the station, where they stand on a moving conveyor belt and climb into the ride vehicles.

=== Pre-show ===
Rubeus Hagrid (portrayed by Robbie Coltrane) will take Muggles on a very special Care of Magical Creatures class and has acquired the help of Arthur Weasley (portrayed by Mark Williams) to tinker with Hagrid's motorbike, whose original owner is mentioned to be Sirius Black, in an attempt to duplicate it in order to take Muggles to the edge of the Forbidden Forest. After Arthur successfully duplicates the motorbike, Fang, Hagrid's pet boarhound, releases Cornish Pixies that were covered in their cage and start to wreak havoc by taking Arthur's wand, burning the duplicate motorbike and then blowing it up. Arthur then casts Aguamenti to put down the flames and sprays Muggles with water before Hagrid departs to wait for them. Arthur then tells Muggles that he will try to duplicate the motorbike again at the stables, where there is plenty of space to do so and departs with the original motorbike following him before casting Reparo on it.

The pre-show is sometimes preempted during longer-than-usual wait times and, instead, Fang is seen walking around.

=== Layout ===
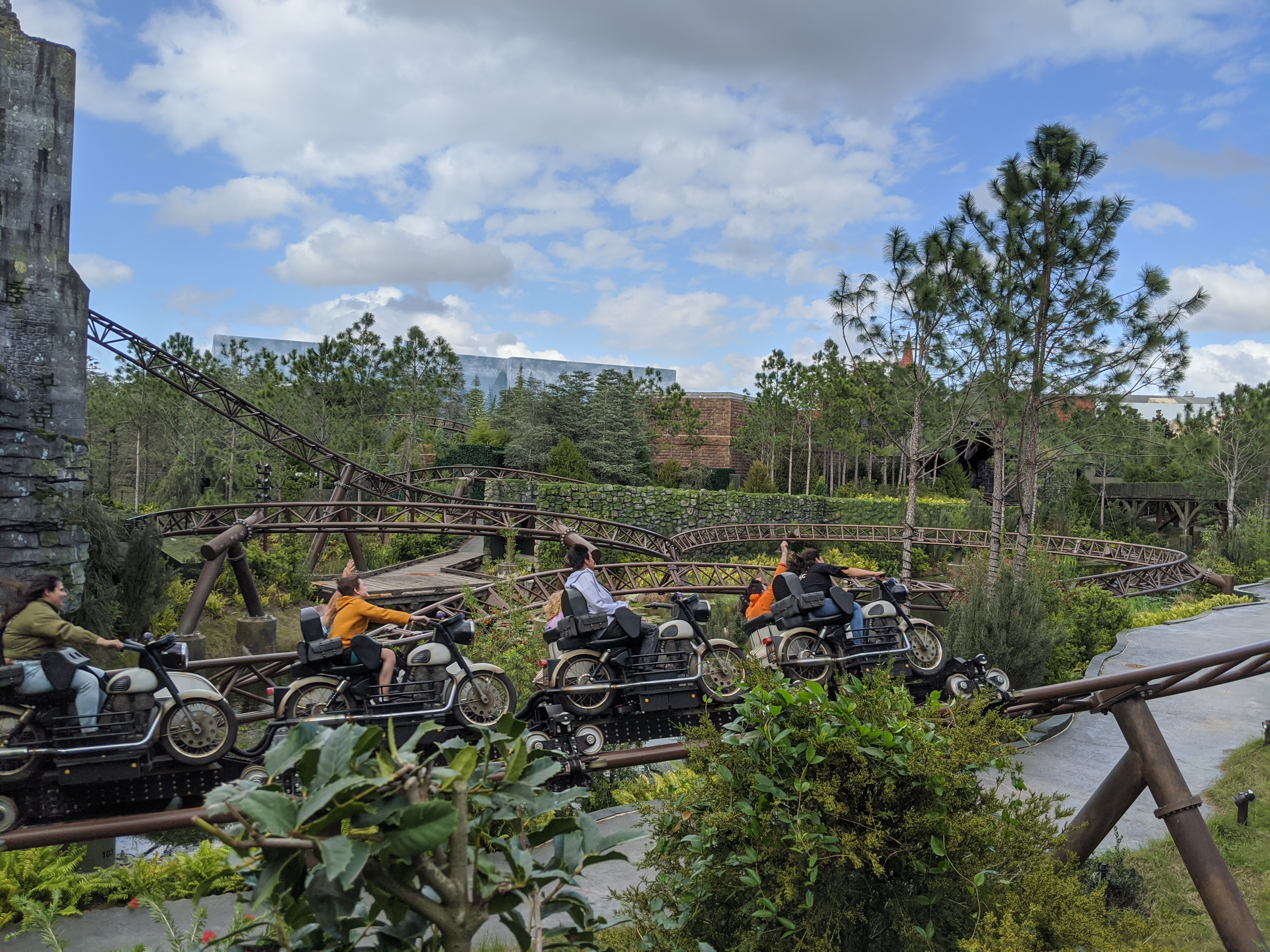
View of the attraction's vehicle trains and the track from the exterior exit queue.

The track winds right out of the loading station, where each train reaches the first LSM launch, sending riders through an s-curve slope and into a second launch. Riders then pass by a semi-indoor scene featuring Hagrid, who says he will meet up with the Muggles at an abandoned hut at the edge of the Forbidden Forest. Once the bikes reach Hagrid's hut, a Blast-Ended Skrewt sprays smoke at the riders. The vehicles exit the hut by turning right, which leads into the third launch and then an airtime hill. Riders pass by an abandoned castle and make a left-handed dive into a tunnel. Following a series of turns, the vehicles approach the fourth launch, initiating a double-right turn as Hagrid warns that the bikes are outside of his control. The vehicles then make a right turn and slow down on the mid-course brake run.

Fluffy, the three-headed dog from the film franchise, is seen on the left as riders pass by and make a turn to the left. After passing over a switchtrack, a fifth launch sends riders speeding into a tunnel with a group of Cornish Pixies that have taken over Arthur Weasley's broken-down flying Ford Anglia. The train exits the tunnel and rises up a 65-foot-tall (20 m) vertical spike before losing power and dropping backward through a sixth launch, taking riders through a tunnel and helix, then slowing down at the darkest part of the Forbidden Forest as the Muggles pass a centaur. The train eventually stops in the tentacles of Devil's Snare. Hagrid encourages Muggles to chant the incantation "Lumos Solem", which is immediately followed by a 17-foot (5.2 m) free-fall into a cave below filled with glowing Blast-Ended Skrewts that surround riders.

Hagrid offers congratulations for finding them, and the train exits the building into the final launch, accelerating to the ride's maximum speed of 50 mph (80 km/h). Fog effects engage near the tracks, as the train hits a left banked turn and passes the on-ride camera. After this, the vehicles make a right turn before stopping at the abandoned castle, where a unicorn and her foal are spotted. Riders return to the loading station as Hagrid thanks everyone, though he asks them not to tell anyone at Hogwarts about the experience.

== Reception ==
Hagrid's Magical Creatures Motorbike Adventure was positively received by guests on opening day. It was awarded the Golden Ticket Award for Best New Attraction Installation by Amusement Today in 2019 and was awarded second place for Best New Roller Coaster.

Golden Ticket Awards: Top steel Roller Coasters
Year									1998	1999
Ranking									–	–
Year	2000	2001	2002	2003	2004	2005	2006	2007	2008	2009
Ranking	–	–	–	–	–	–	–	–	–	–
Year	2010	2011	2012	2013	2014	2015	2016	2017	2018	2019
Ranking	–	–	–	–	–	–	–	–	–	–
Year	2020	2021	2022	2023	2024	2025				
Ranking	N/A	33 (tie)	24	19	22 (tie)	23				

Golden Ticket Awards: Best New Attraction Installation of 2019
Ranking	1

Golden Ticket Awards: Golden Ticket Award for Best New Roller Coaster of 2019
Ranking	2

== Incidents ==
On October 2, 2019, the roller coaster was temporarily shut down after a swarm of honey bees surrounded the attraction. A small fire broke out in the backstage area of the attraction on August 11, 2020, prompting a full evacuation without injuries. The fire was extinguished but the attraction remained closed a couple of days later.

== See also ==
- Harry Potter and the Escape from Gringotts, an enclosed Harry Potter roller coaster located at sister theme park Universal Studios Florida
- Tron Lightcycle Power Run, a motorbike roller coaster at Shanghai Disneyland Park and Magic Kingdom
- Verbolten, the first roller coaster in the United States to feature a drop track located at Busch Gardens Williamsburg
