= Toverland =

Amusement park in Sevenum, The Netherlands

Attractiepark Toverland
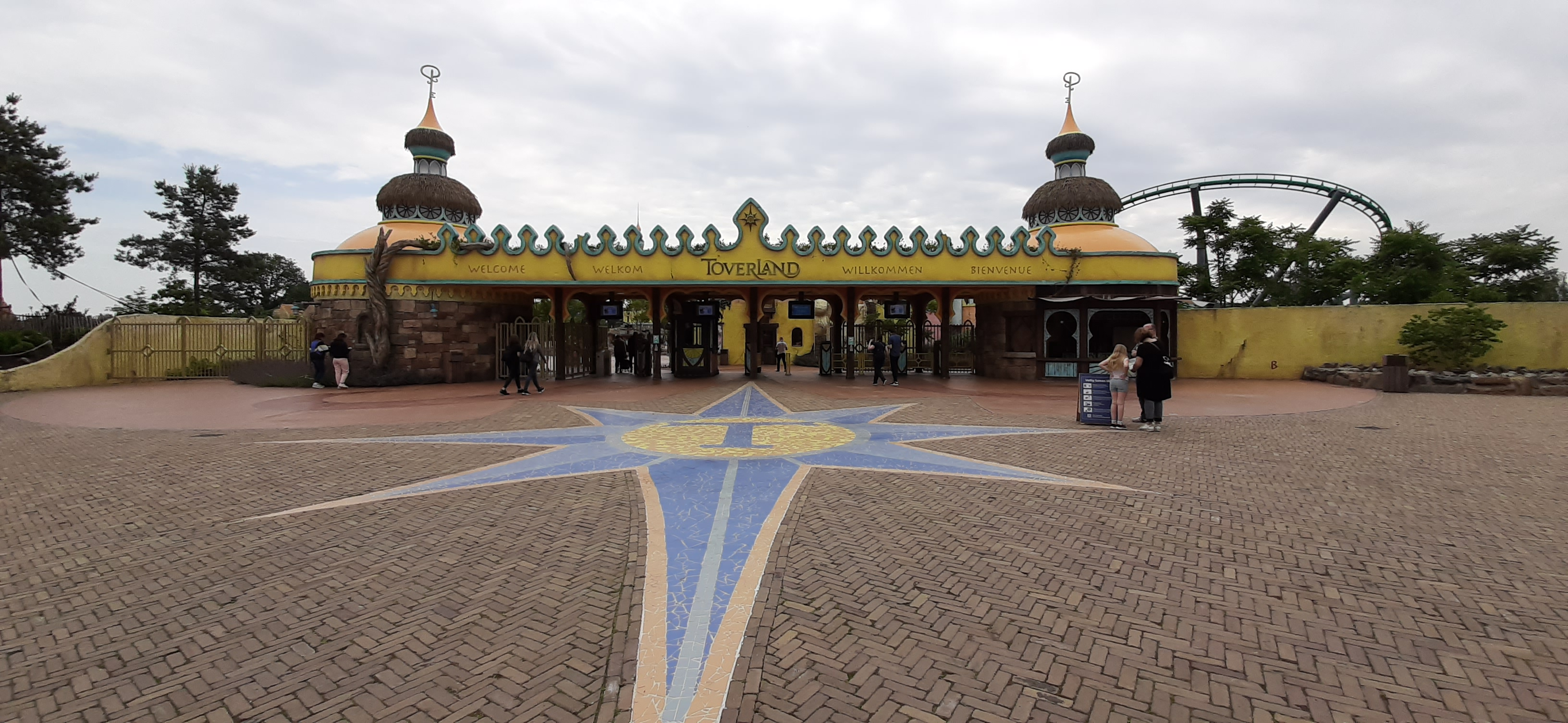
- Interactive map of Attractiepark Toverland
- Location: Sevenum, Netherlands
- Coordinates: 51.396°N 5.986°E
- Status: Operating
- Opened: May 19, 2001; 25 years ago
- Owner: Gelissen Group
- Slogan: Discover Your Own Magic
- Attendance: 1.032.000 (2022)

Attractions
- Total: 36
- Roller coasters: 5
- Water rides: 5
- Website: Attractiepark Toverland

Attractiepark Toverland is a partially indoor amusement park located in Sevenum, the Netherlands. It first opened in 2001 as an indoor-only family entertainment centre, operated by the Gelissen Group. Toverland won the European Star Award for the Best Theme Park in 2018. More recently, the park partially rebranded and added new attractions.

== Themed areas ==
Toverland is divided into six themed areas, two of which are situated indoors.

=== Land van Toos ===
The Land van Toos is the original indoor area of the park. The attractions include the Vekoma Junior Coaster "Toos-Express," crossing through the building. The themed area is characterised by the many children's rides and playgrounds.

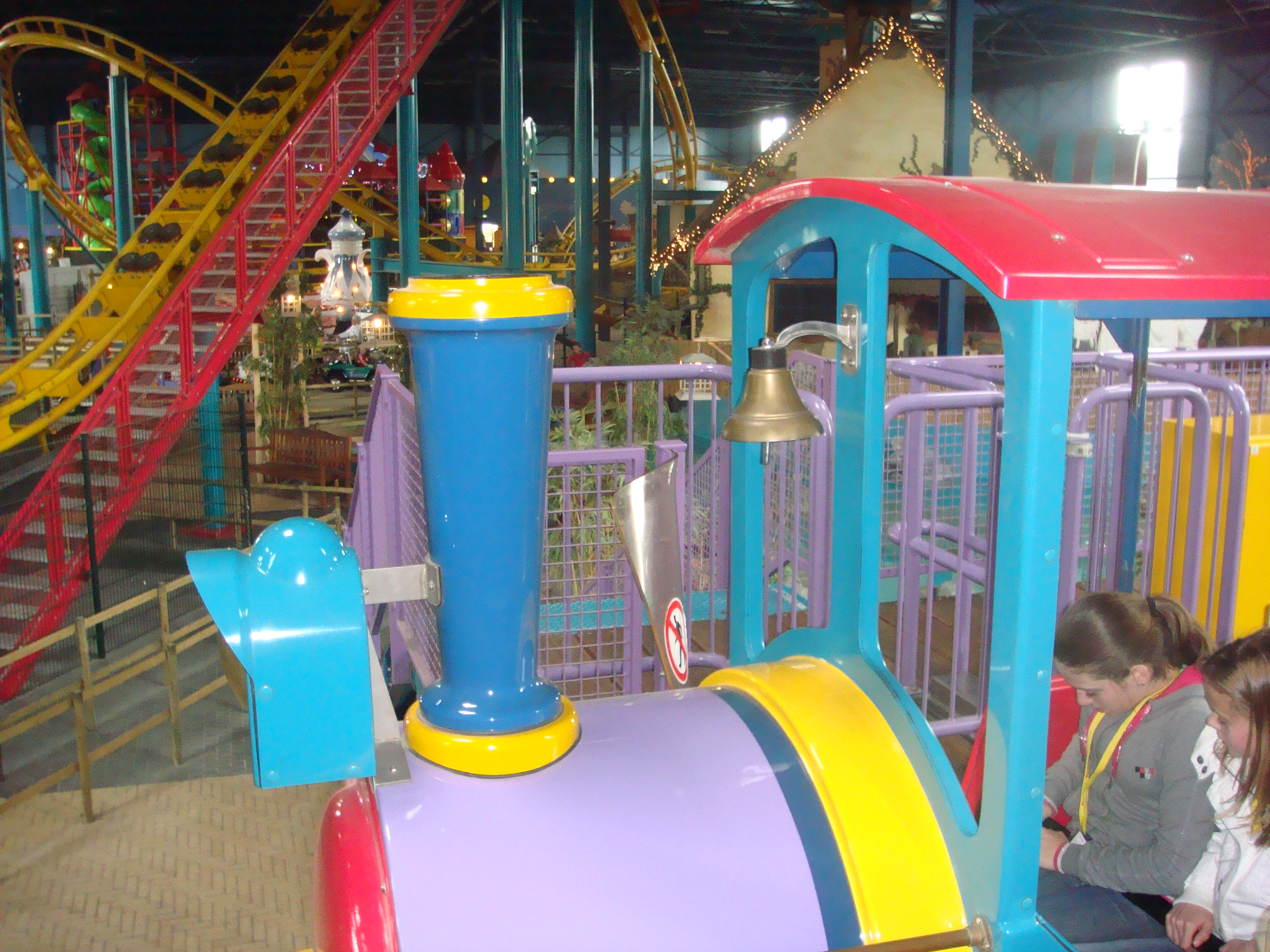
Roller coaster Toos-Express

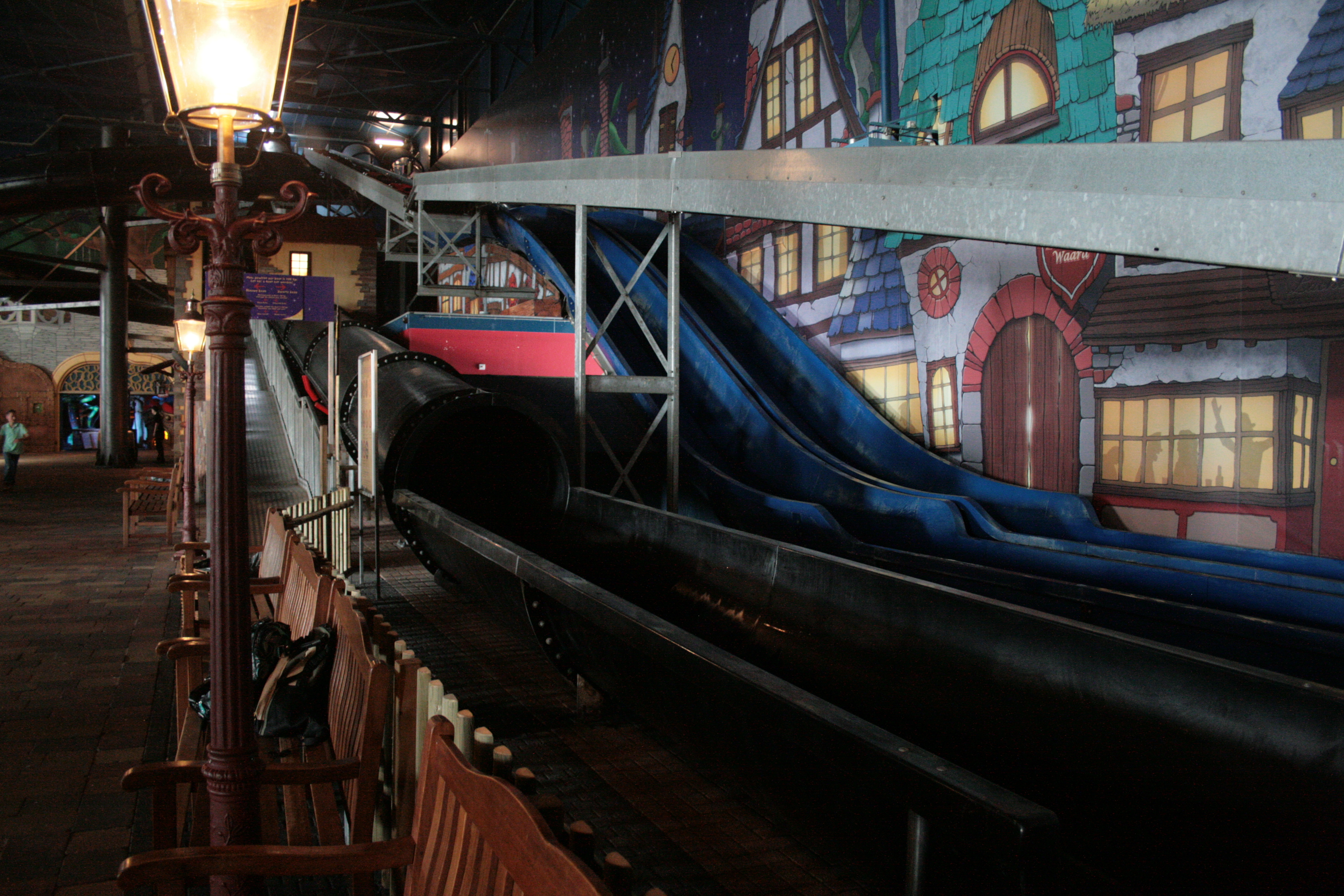
Water slides

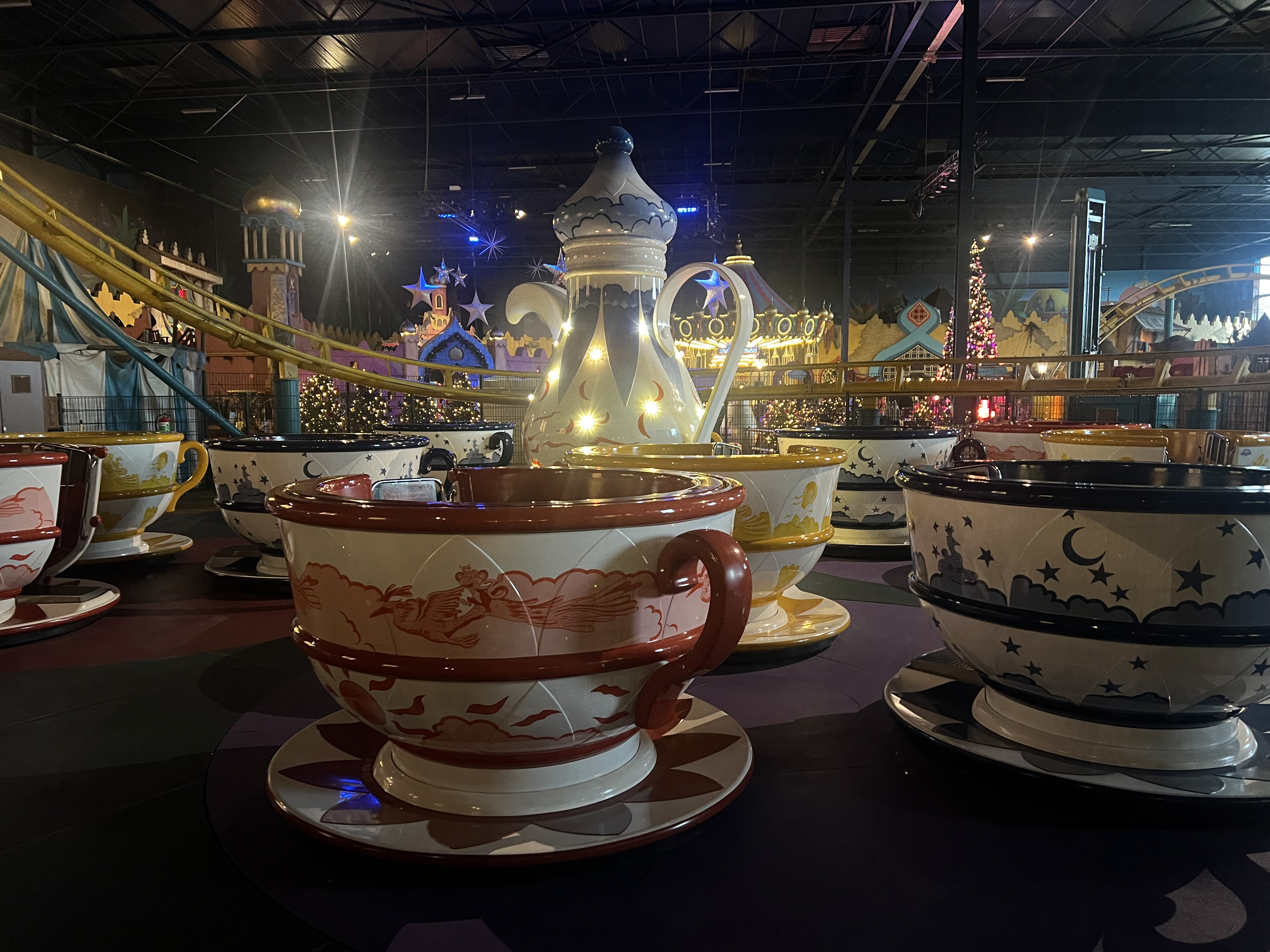
Theekopjes tea cup ride

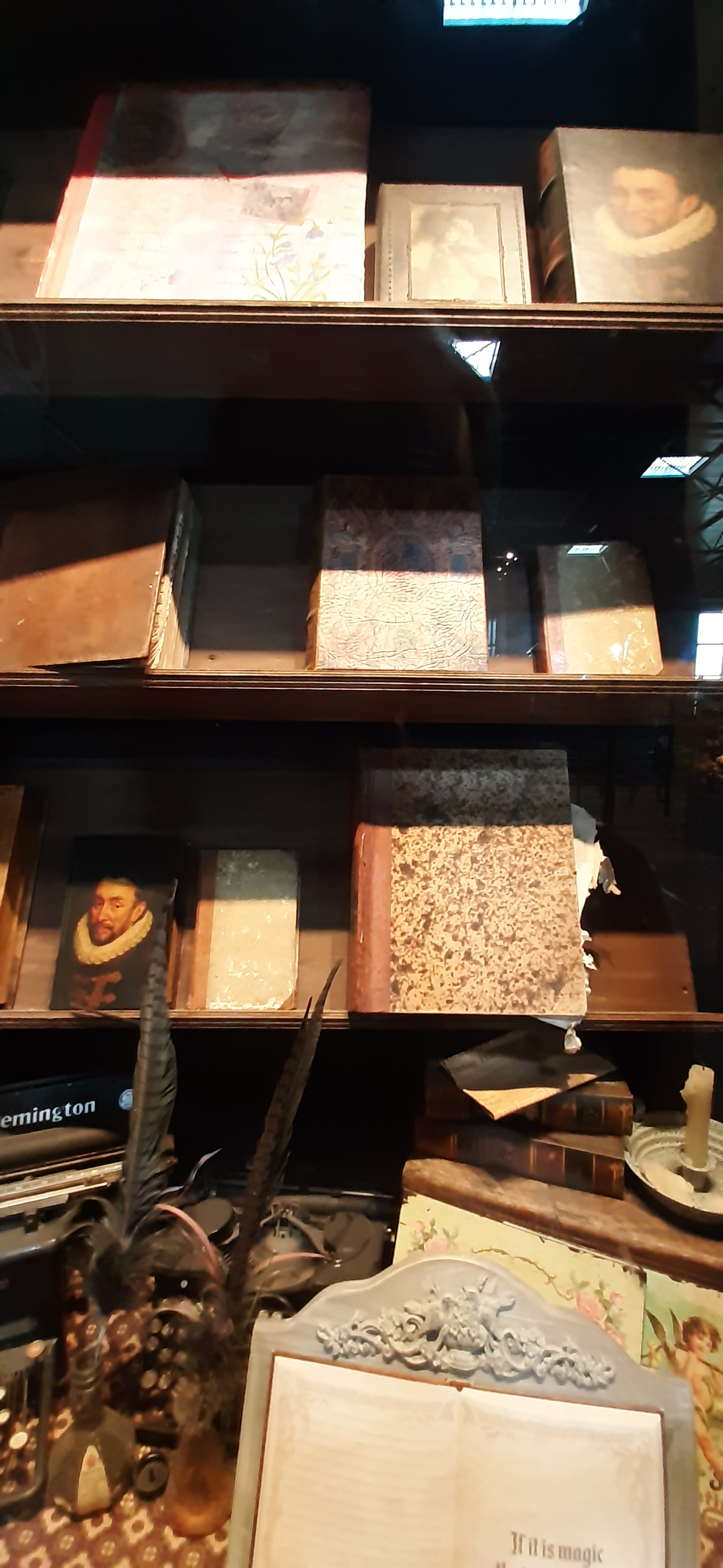
Decoration in the theme area

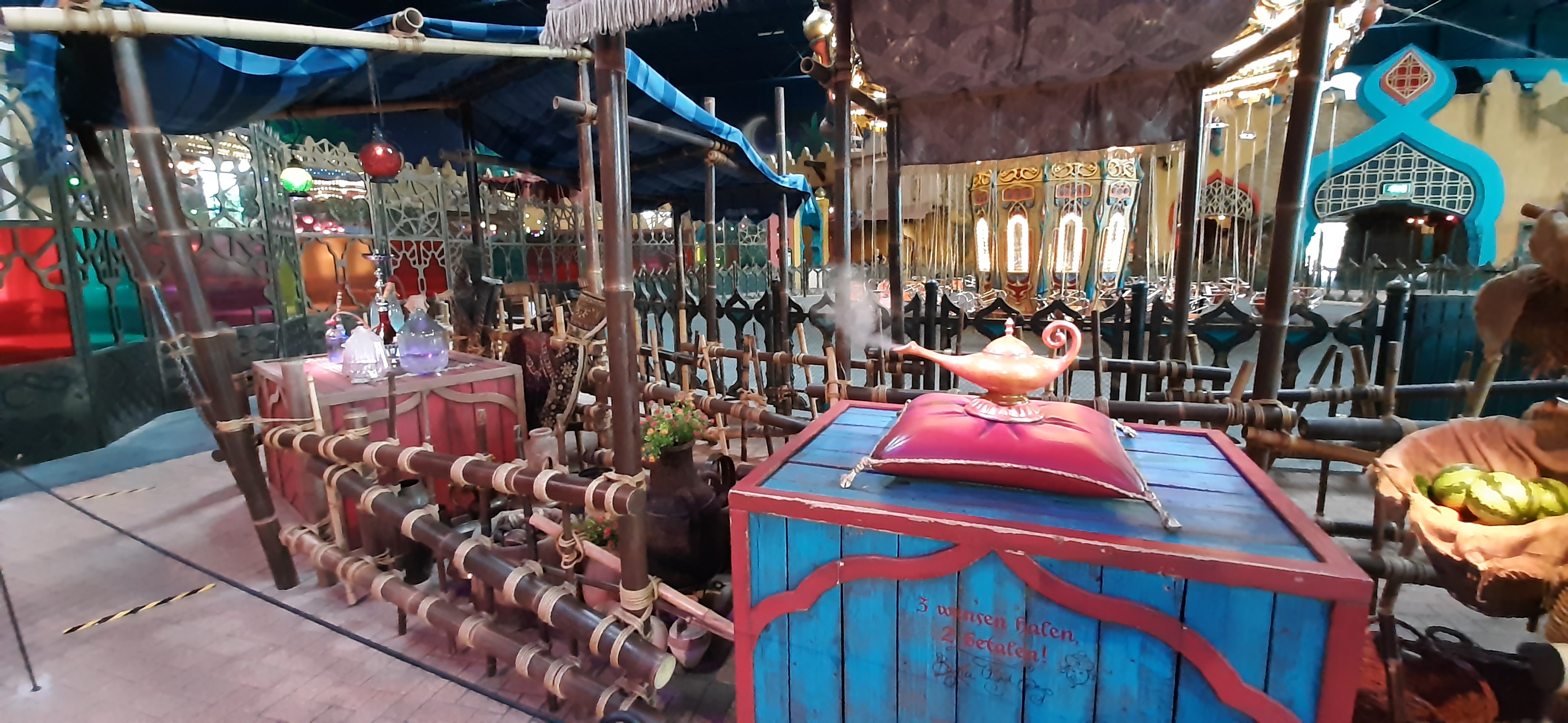
Decoration in the waiting line of the ride Djinn

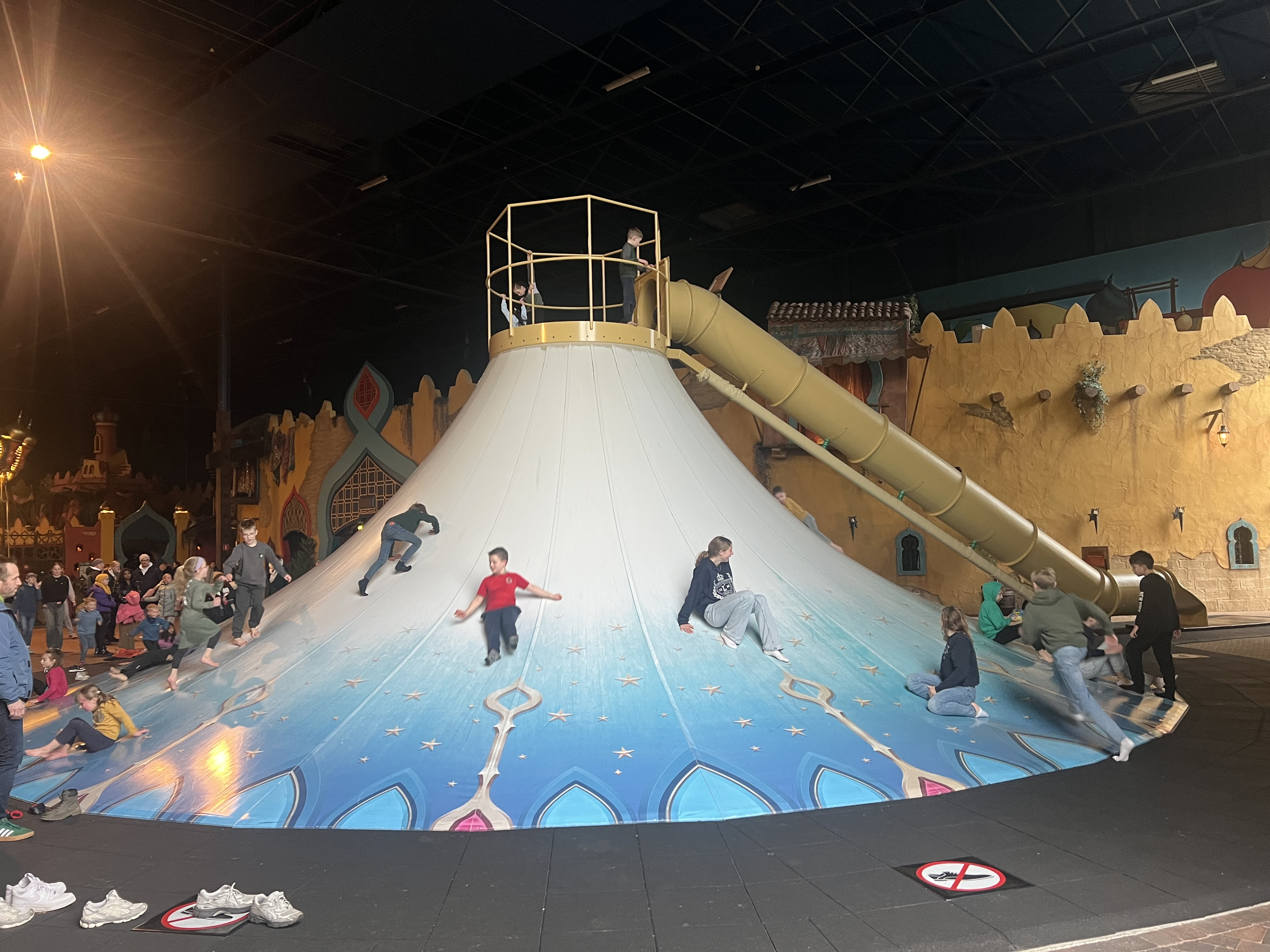
Volcano climb Sim sa la Klim

=== Wunder Wald ===
Wunder Wald is an indoor area located in the same building as the Land van Toos with a ski theme. The area contains playgrounds, a beer garden, and two attractions - a powered toboggan named "Maximus' Blitz Bahn" and Expedition Zork, a log flume. Between 2015 and 2018 Wunder Wald was rebuilt as a theme area about alpine countries. Before that, Wunder Wald was called Magic Forest and did not have any decoration. The ride Maximus' Blitz Bahn was the first ride in the theme park with a background story and a themed queue.

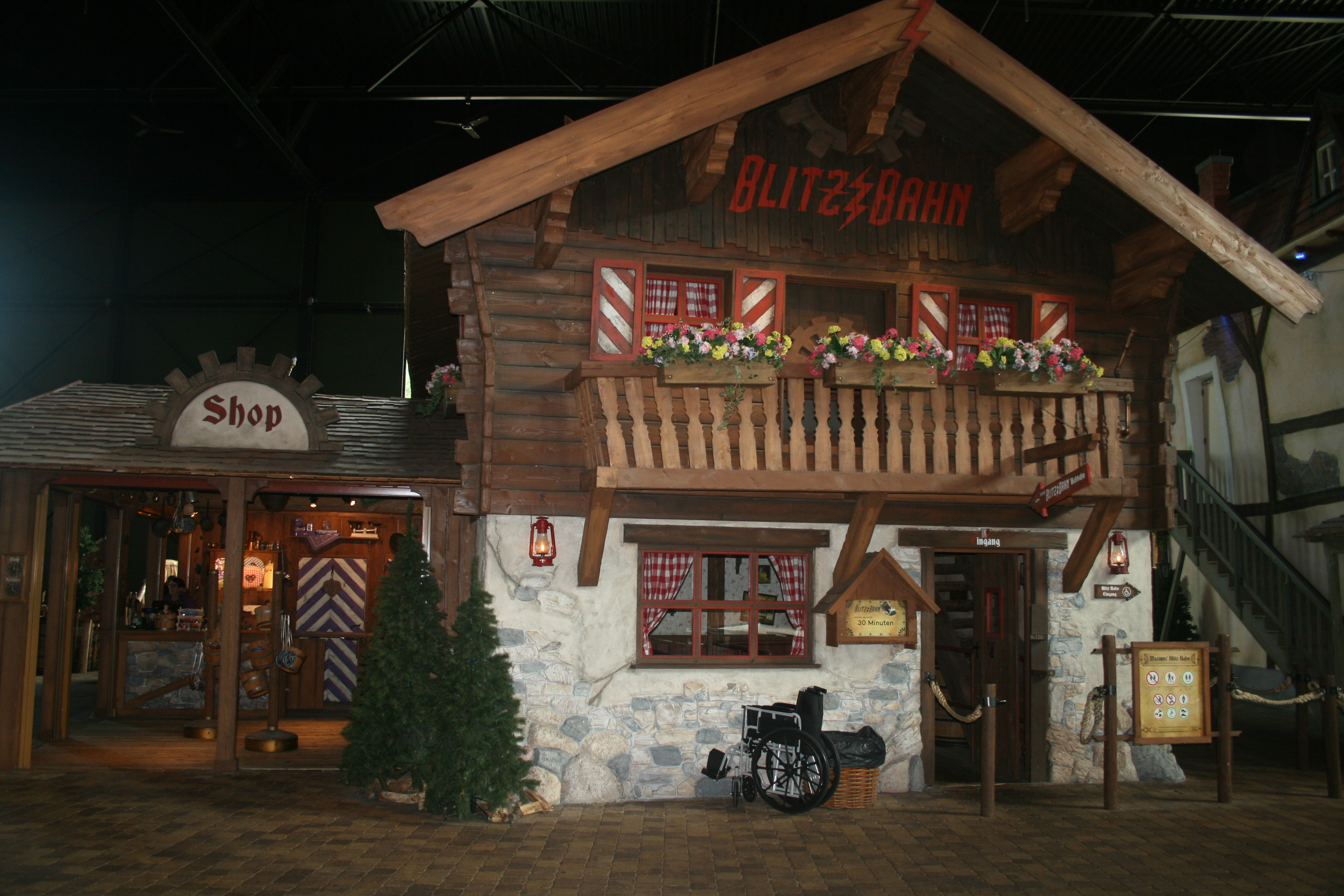
Entrance of Maximus' Blitz Bahn, a powered summer tobogann.

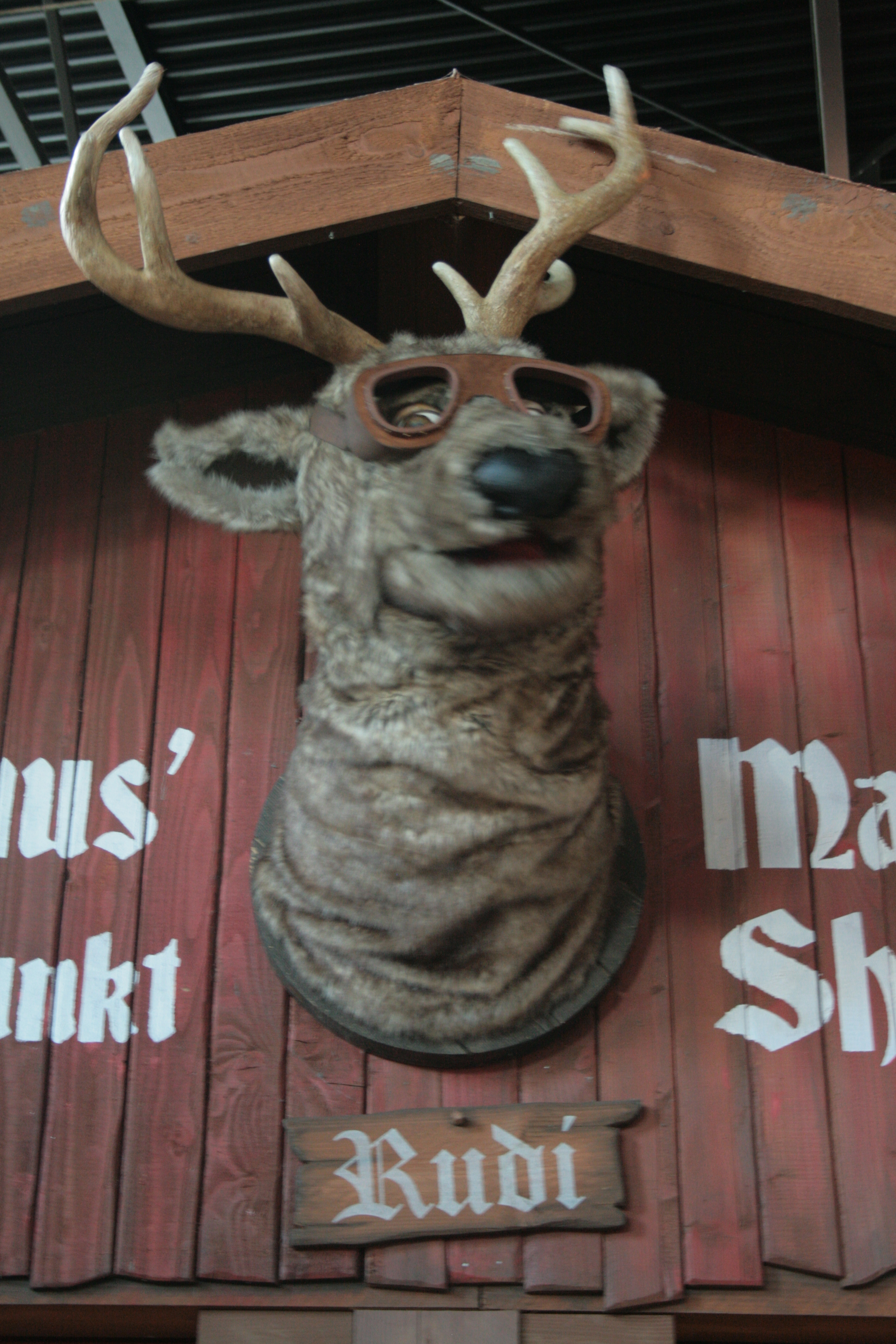
Animatronic of a deer.

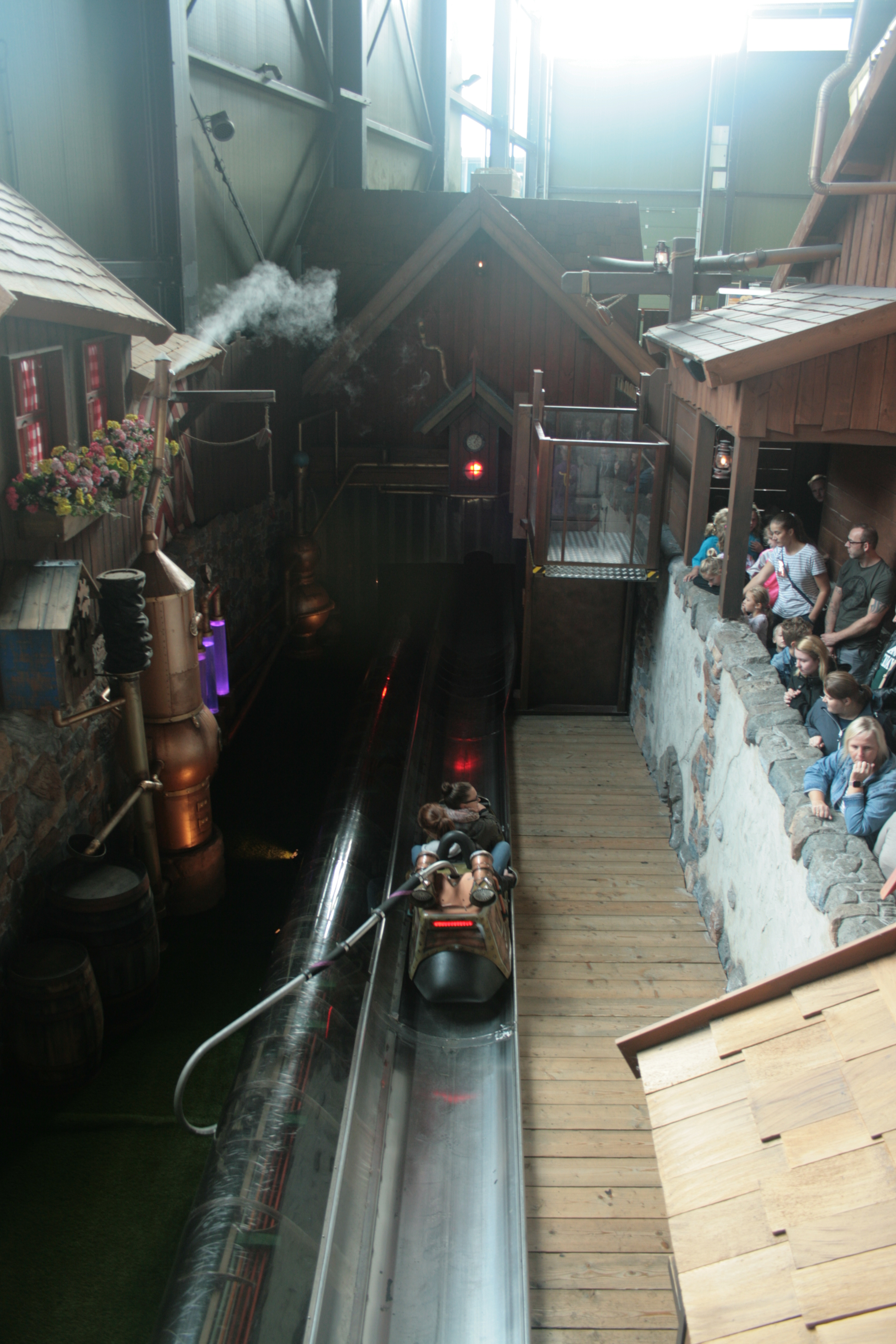
Station of Maximus' Blitz Bahn

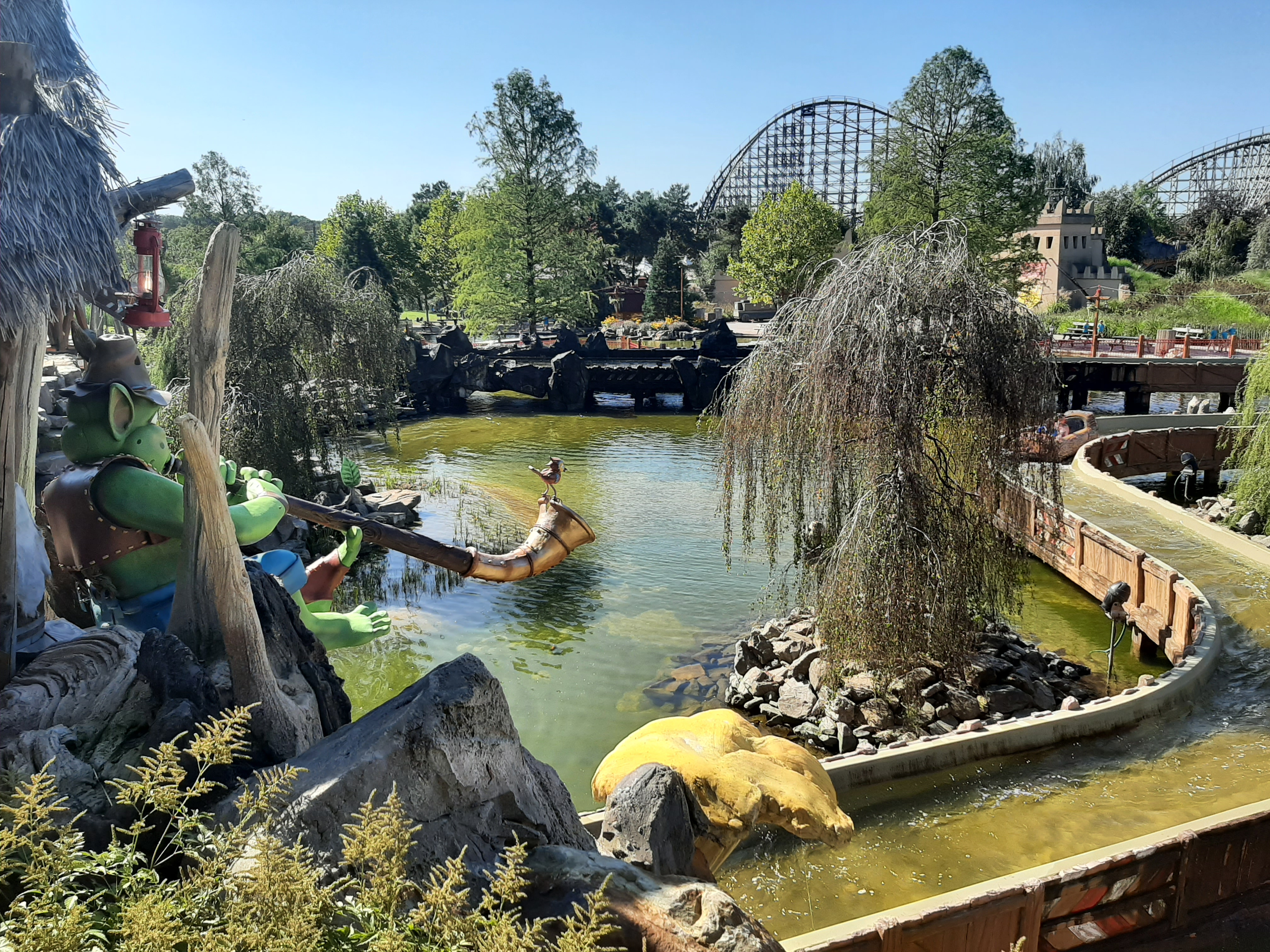
Log Flume Expedition Zork

=== Ithaka ===
Ithaka was the first outdoor section of the park, themed to the Ancient Greeks. Ithaka contains three major rides including Troy, a wooden coaster built by Great Coasters International. The area was originally simply named "Troy-Area" in reference to its largest attraction, and features a large replica of the Trojan Horse.

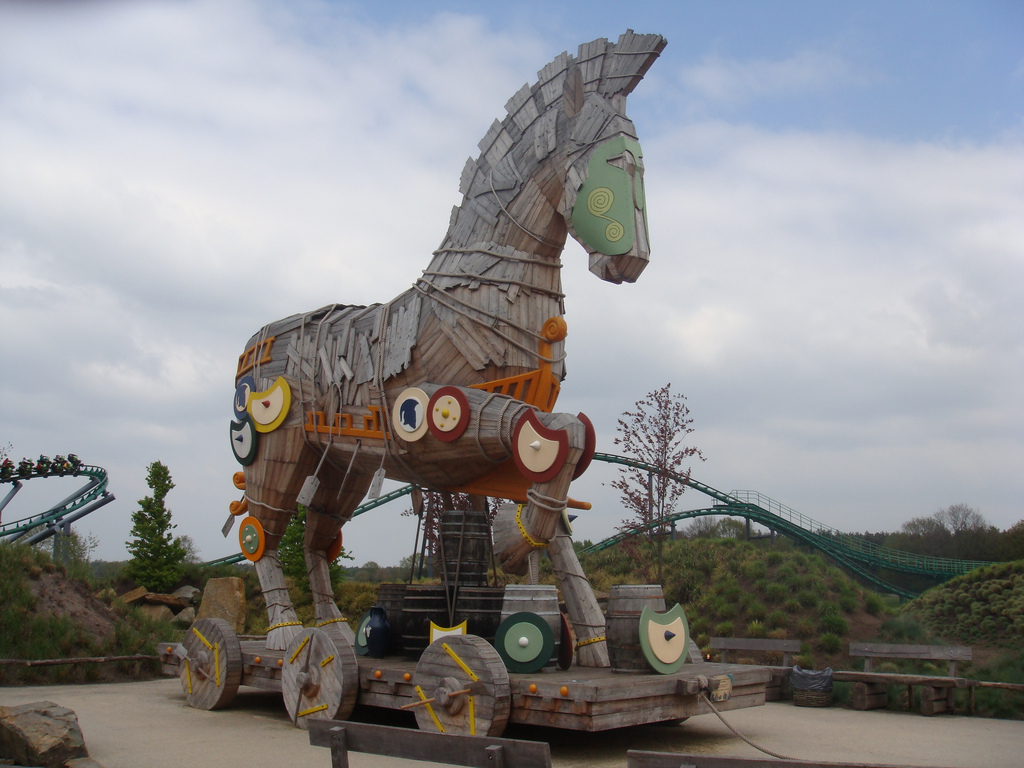
Trojan Horse

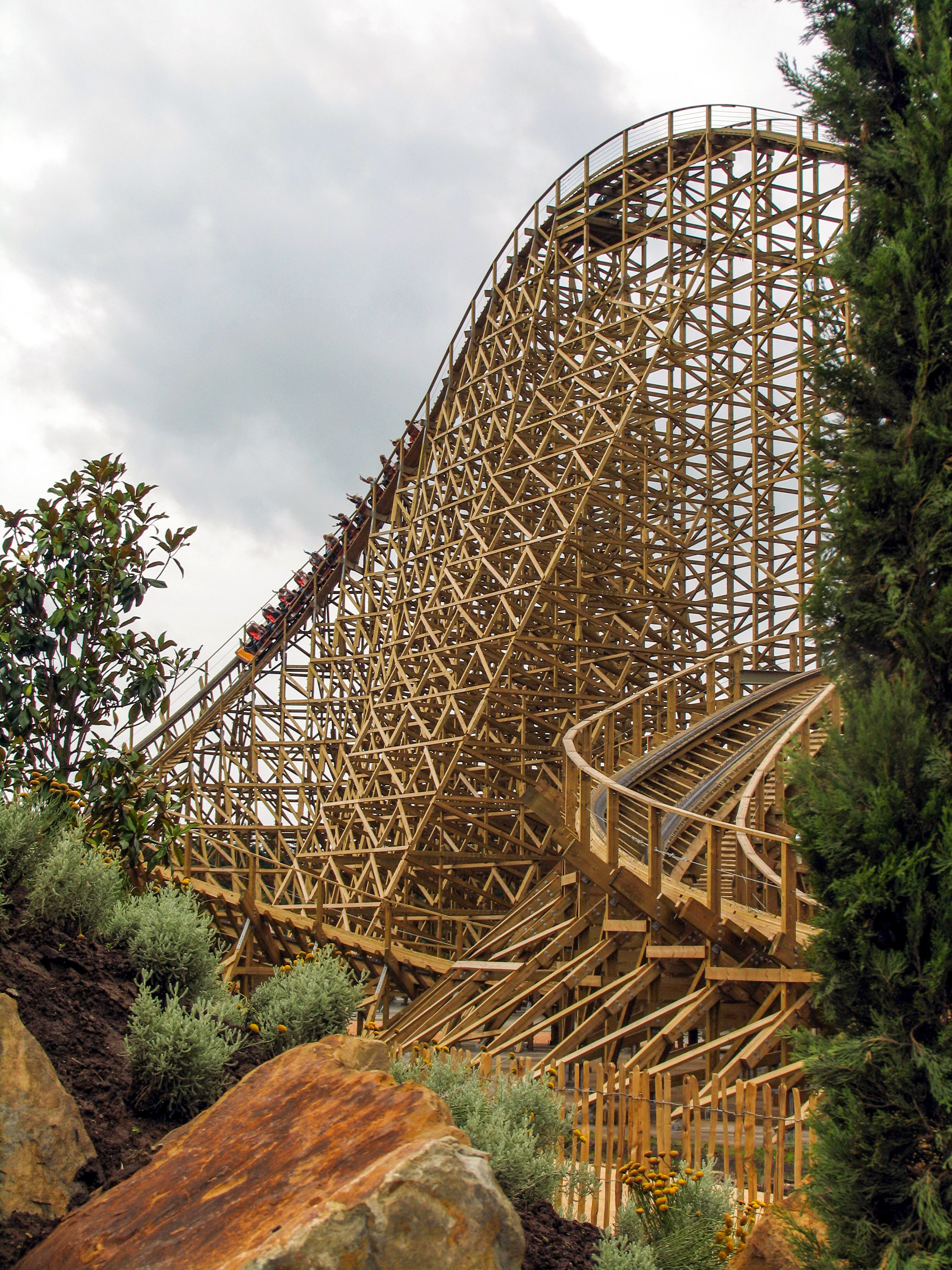
First drop of wooden roller coaster Troy.

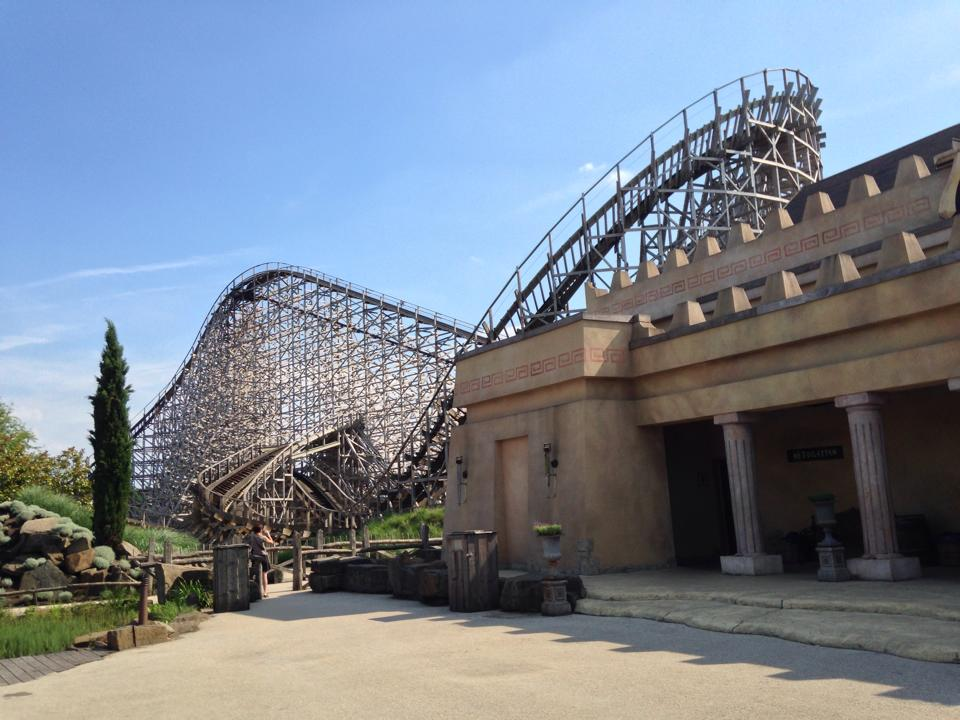
Station of roller coaster Troy.

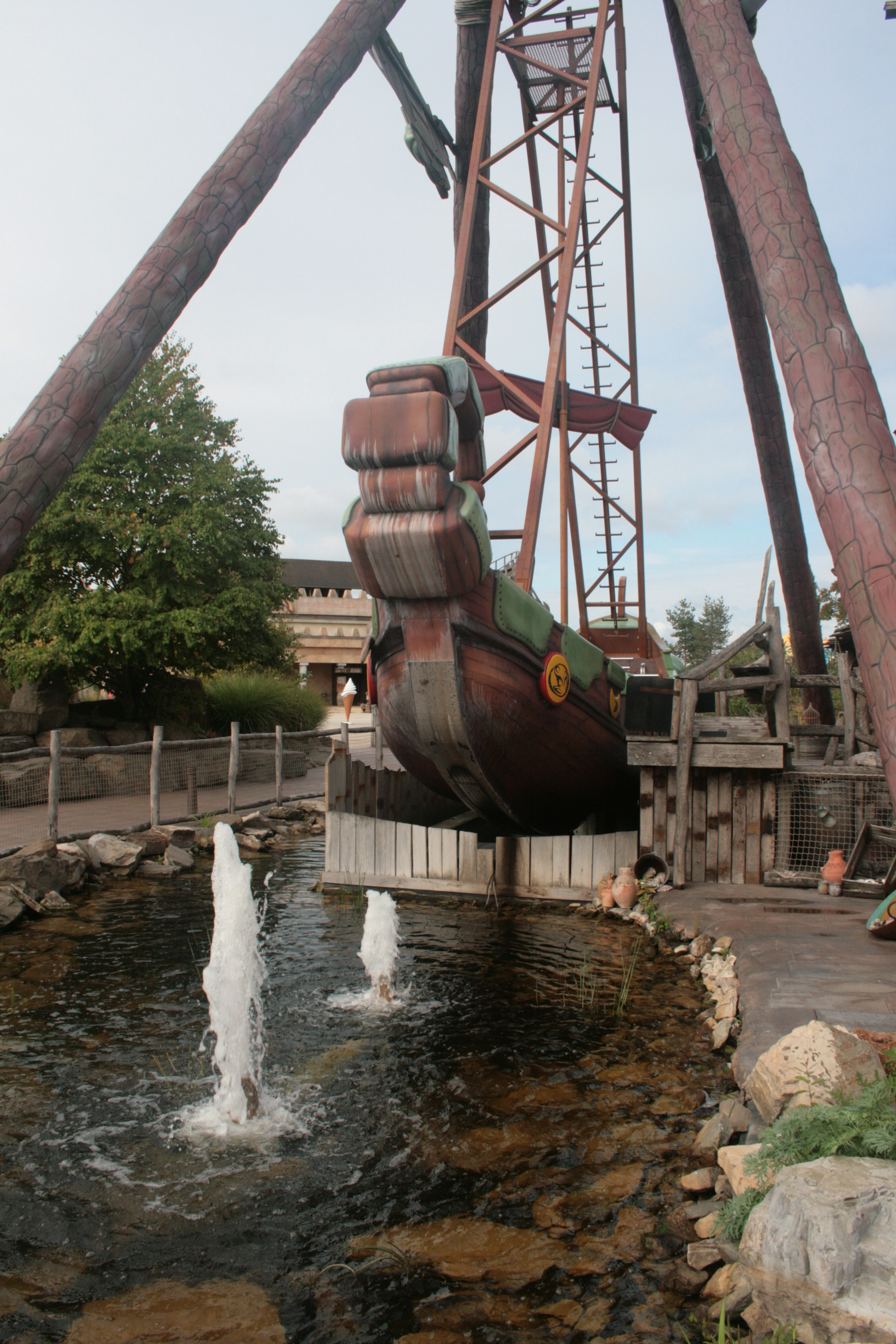
Pirate ship Scorpios

=== Magische Vallei ===
The Magical Valley is themed as a fantasy land populated by 'Dwervels'. Major attractions in the area includes rollercoasters Dwervelwind and Booster Bike, a rapid river attraction, and several restaurants.

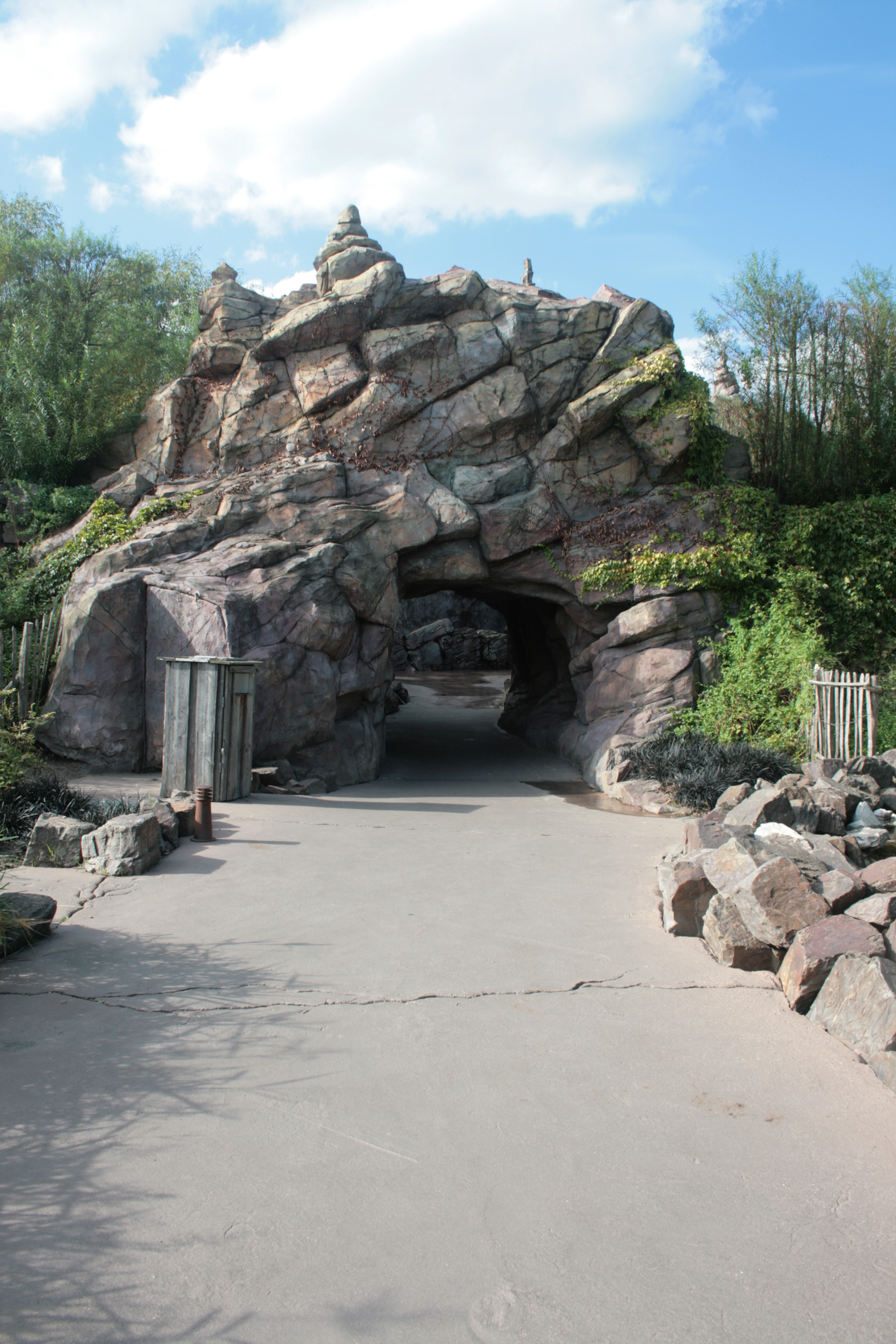
Tunnel through rock formation

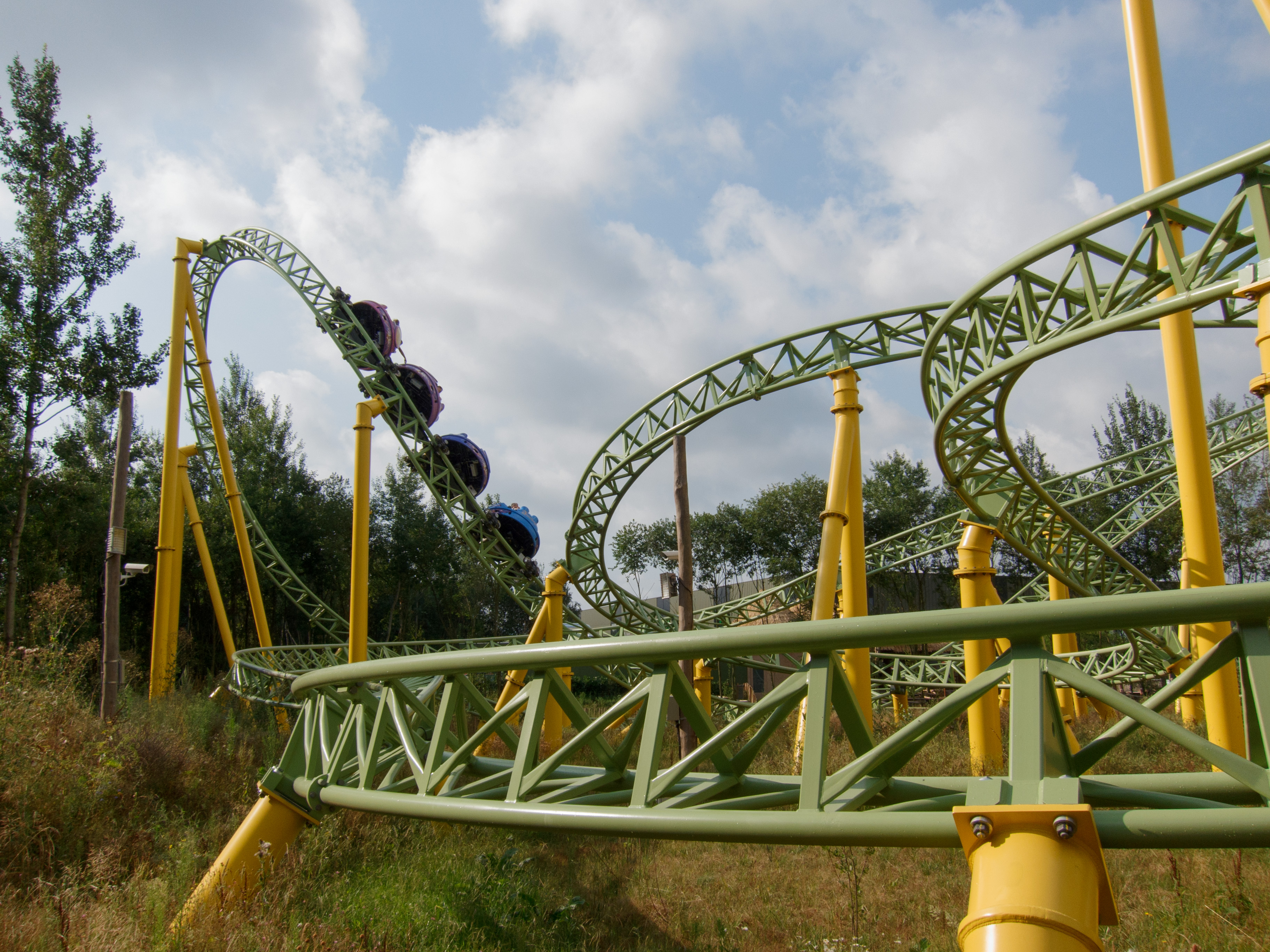
Spinning roller coaster Dwervelwind

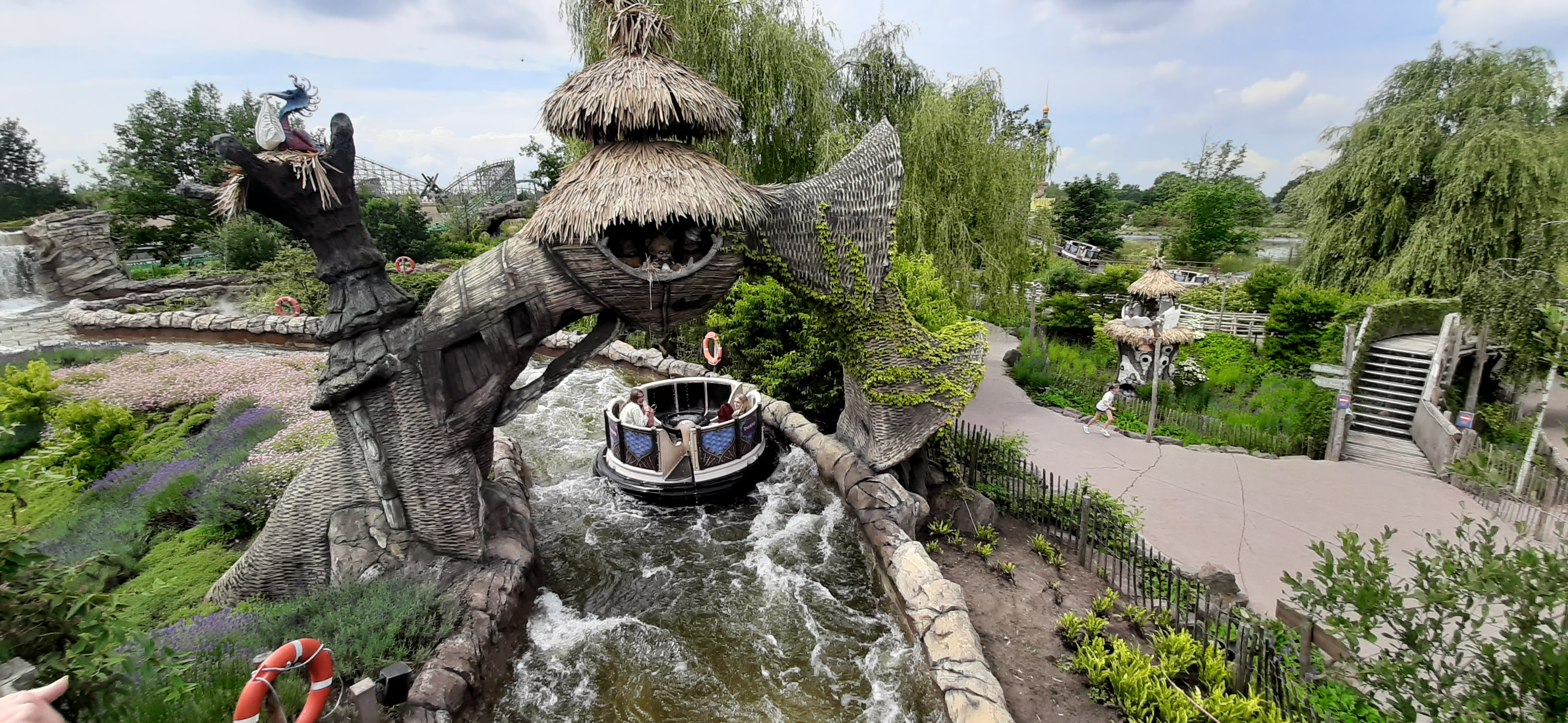
Rapid River Djengu River

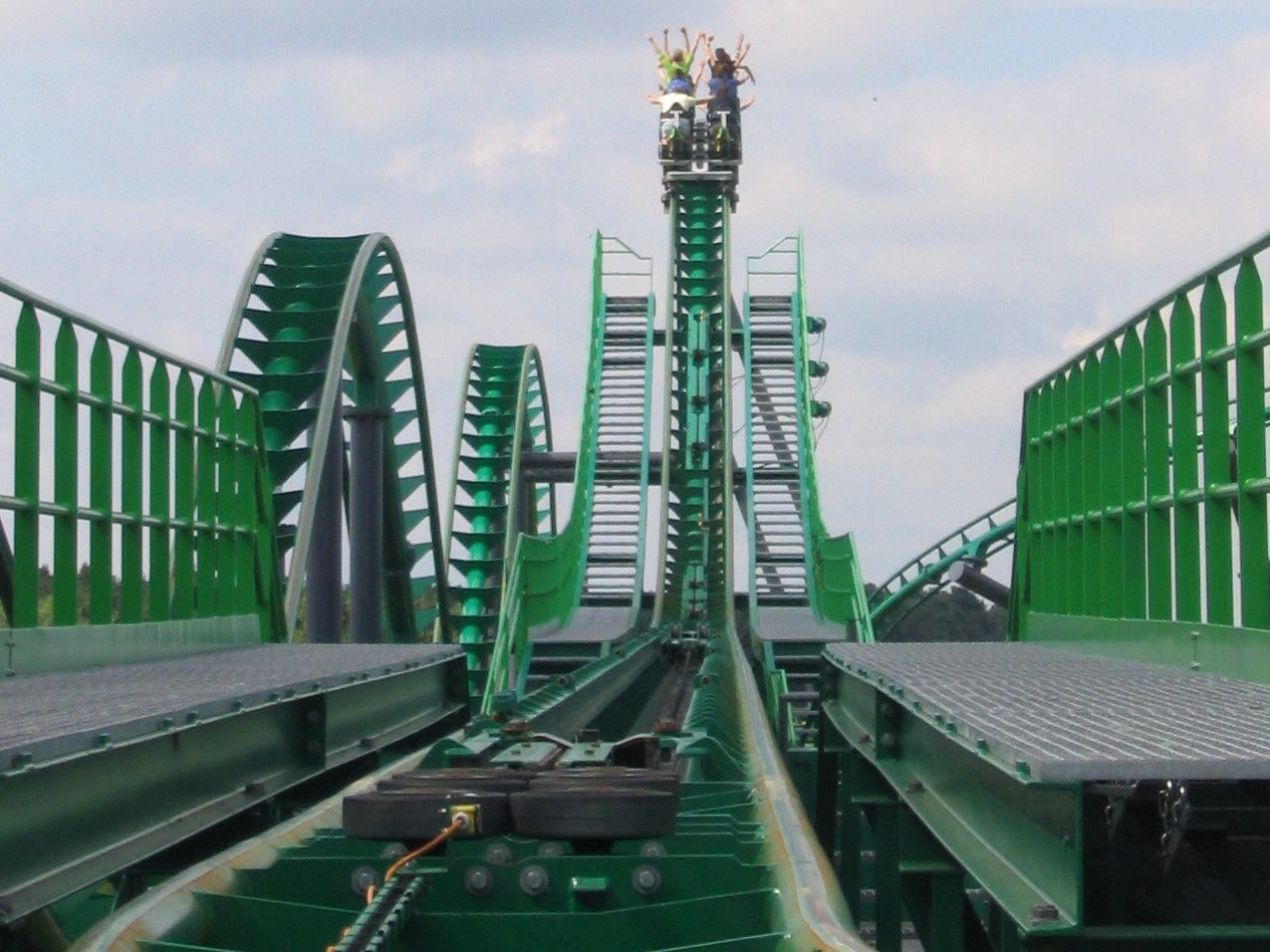
Booster Bike, world's first motor bike coaster.

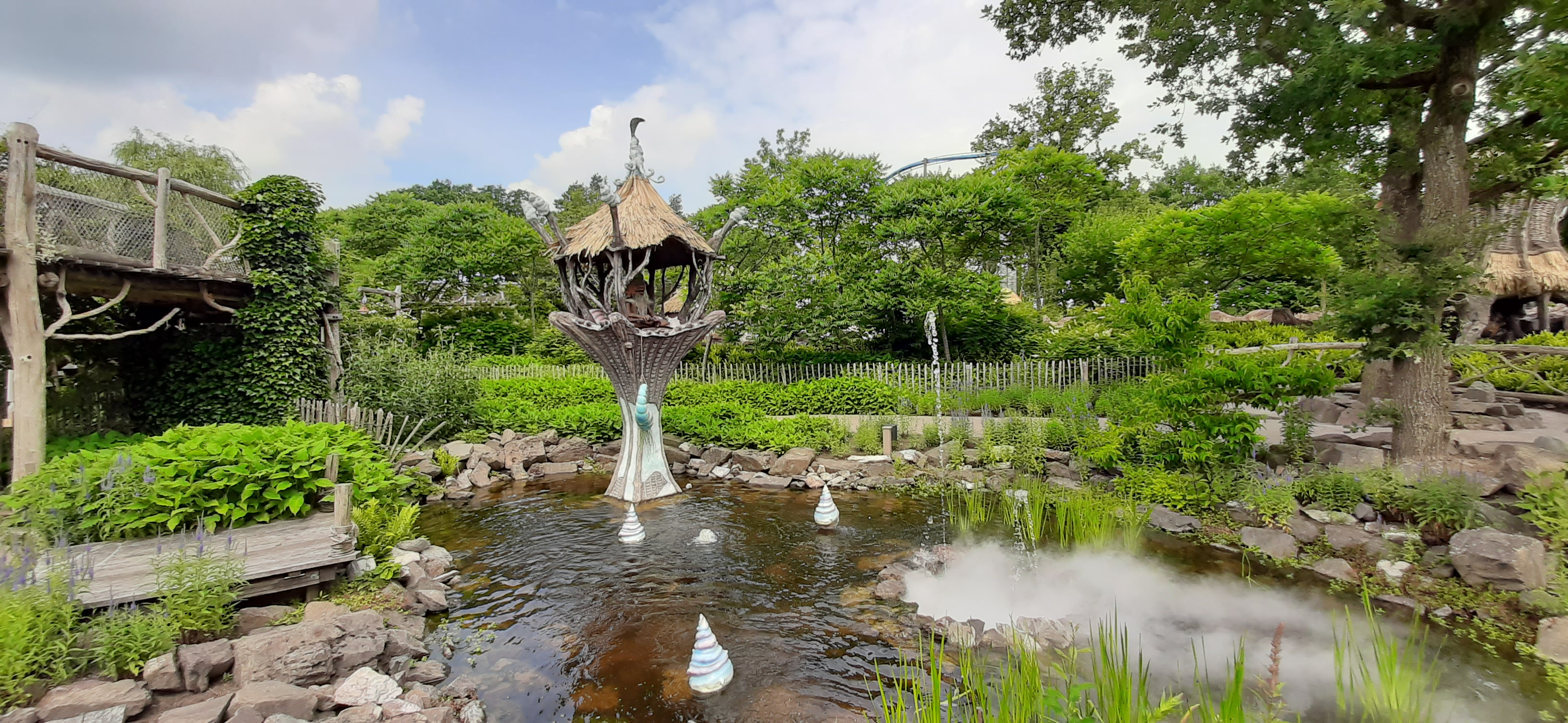
Scenery in the waiting line of the rapid river.

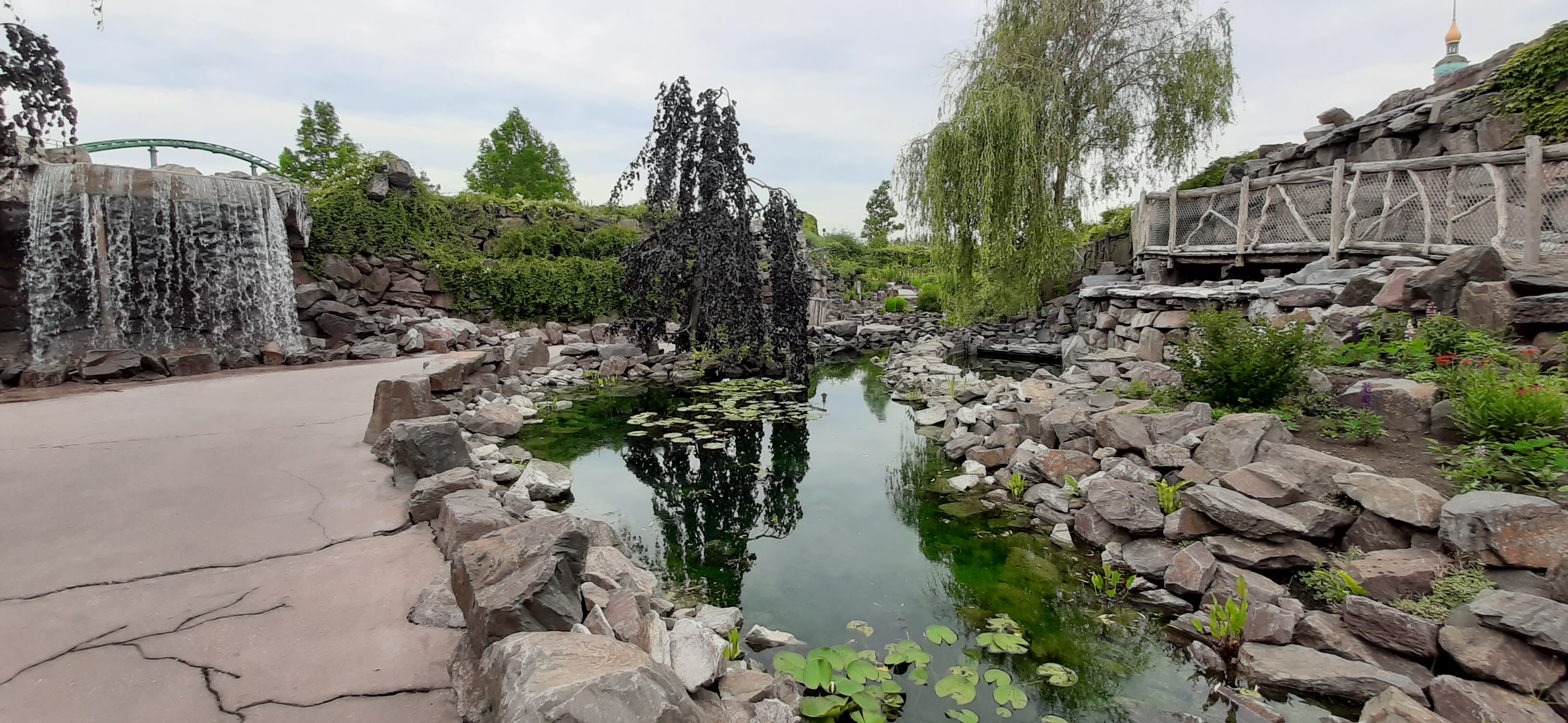

=== Port Laguna ===
Opened in 2018, Port Laguna is the new entrance area of the park. The area is circle-shaped and features a Mediterranean theme with brightly coloured buildings containing shops, drink and food stores, a game gallery and an interactive show. Port Laguna contains no rides. The area was inspired by the entrance of Disney's Animal Kingdom and the theme area Port Entry of Universal's Islands of Adventure, with some notable differences, such as a curved main street.

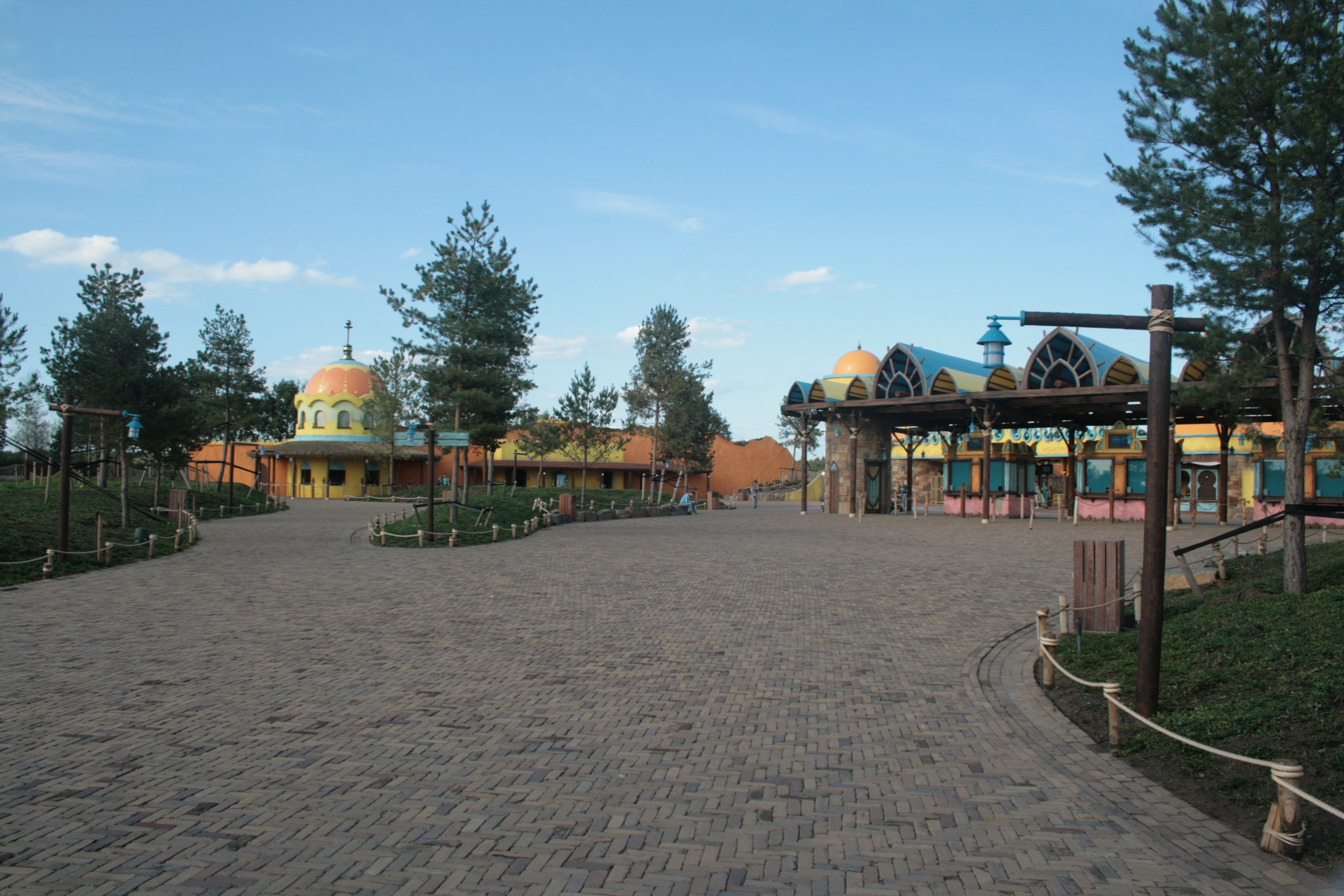
Entrance

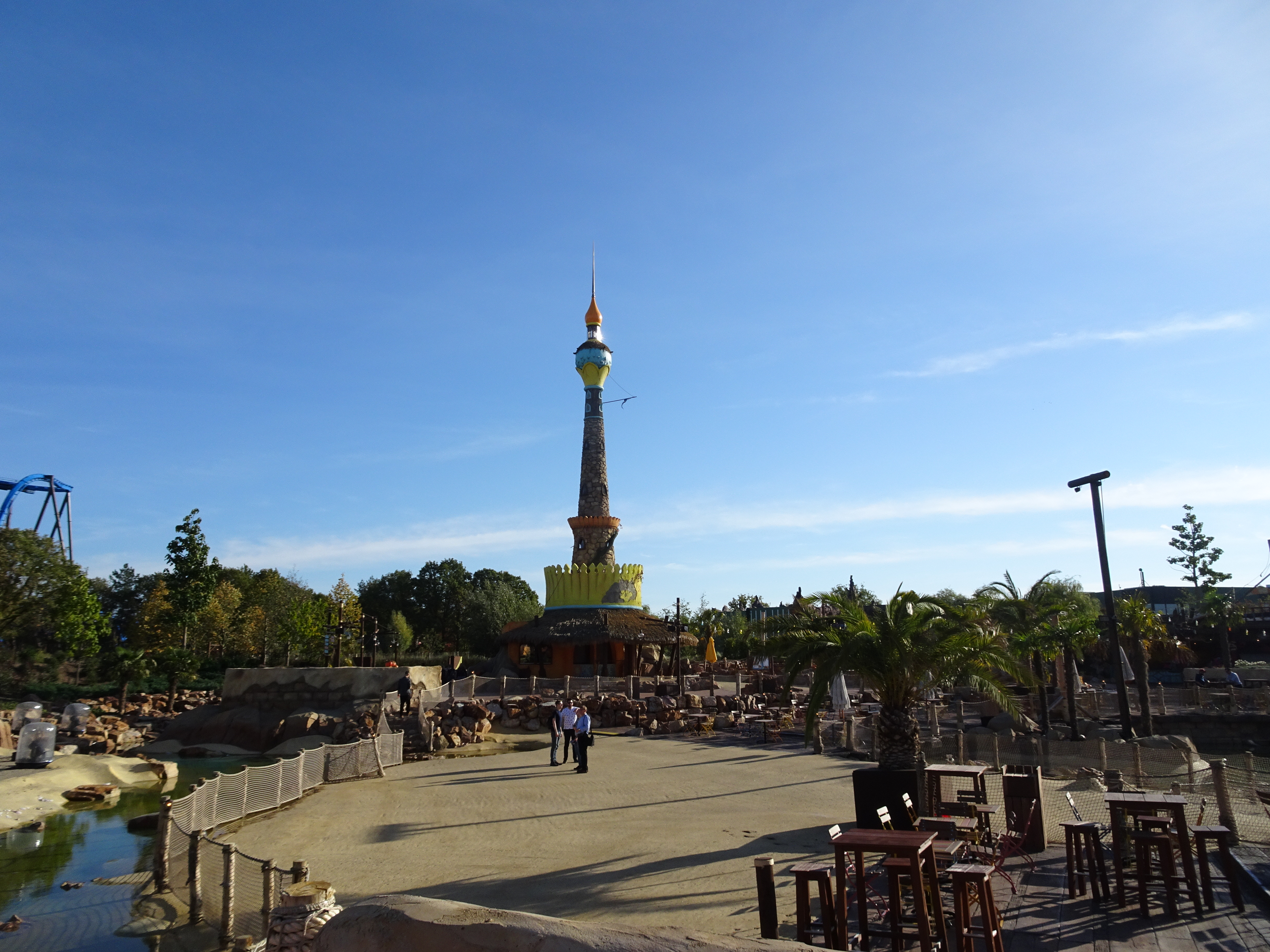
Lighthouse Solaris

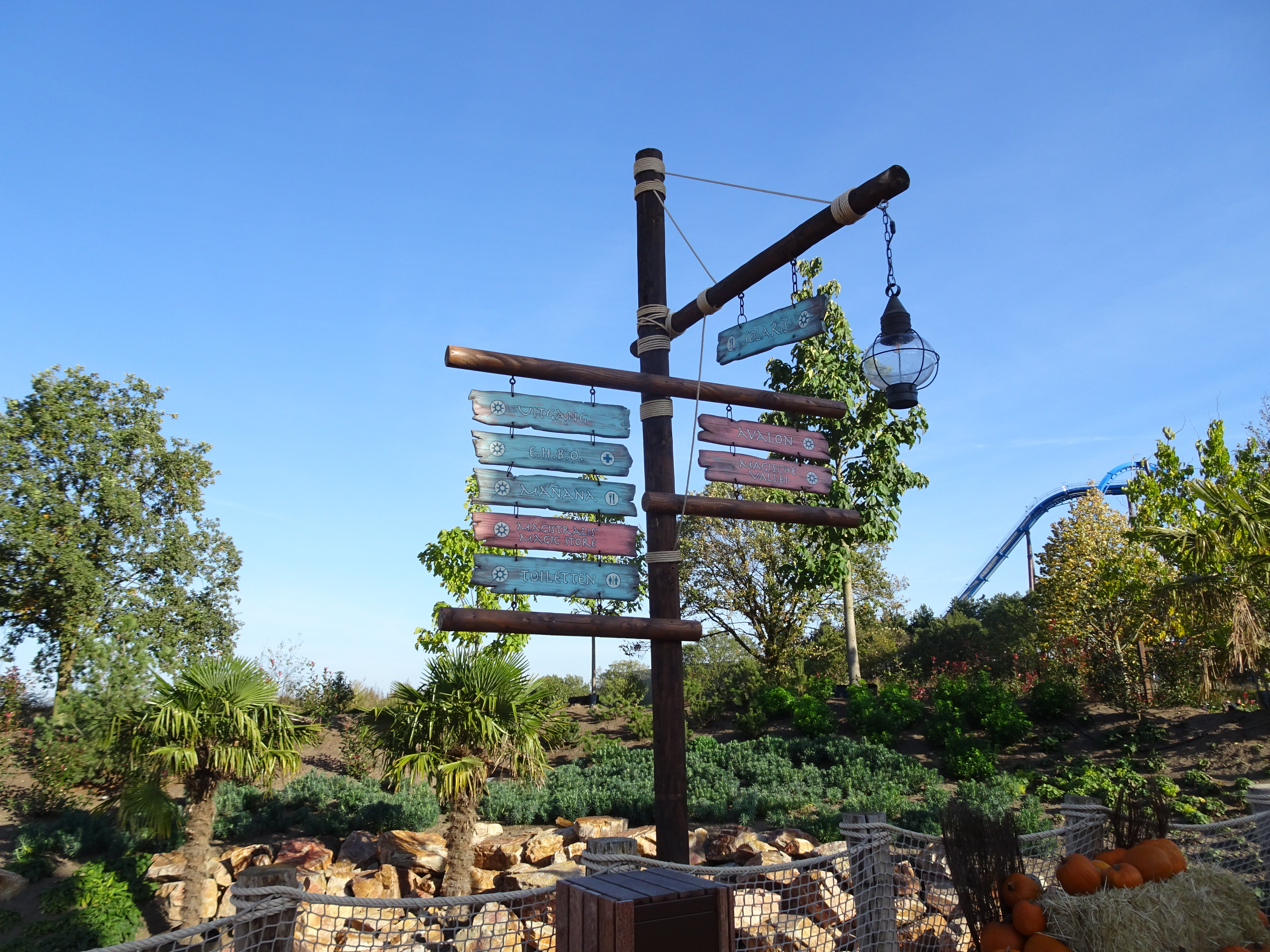
Sign post

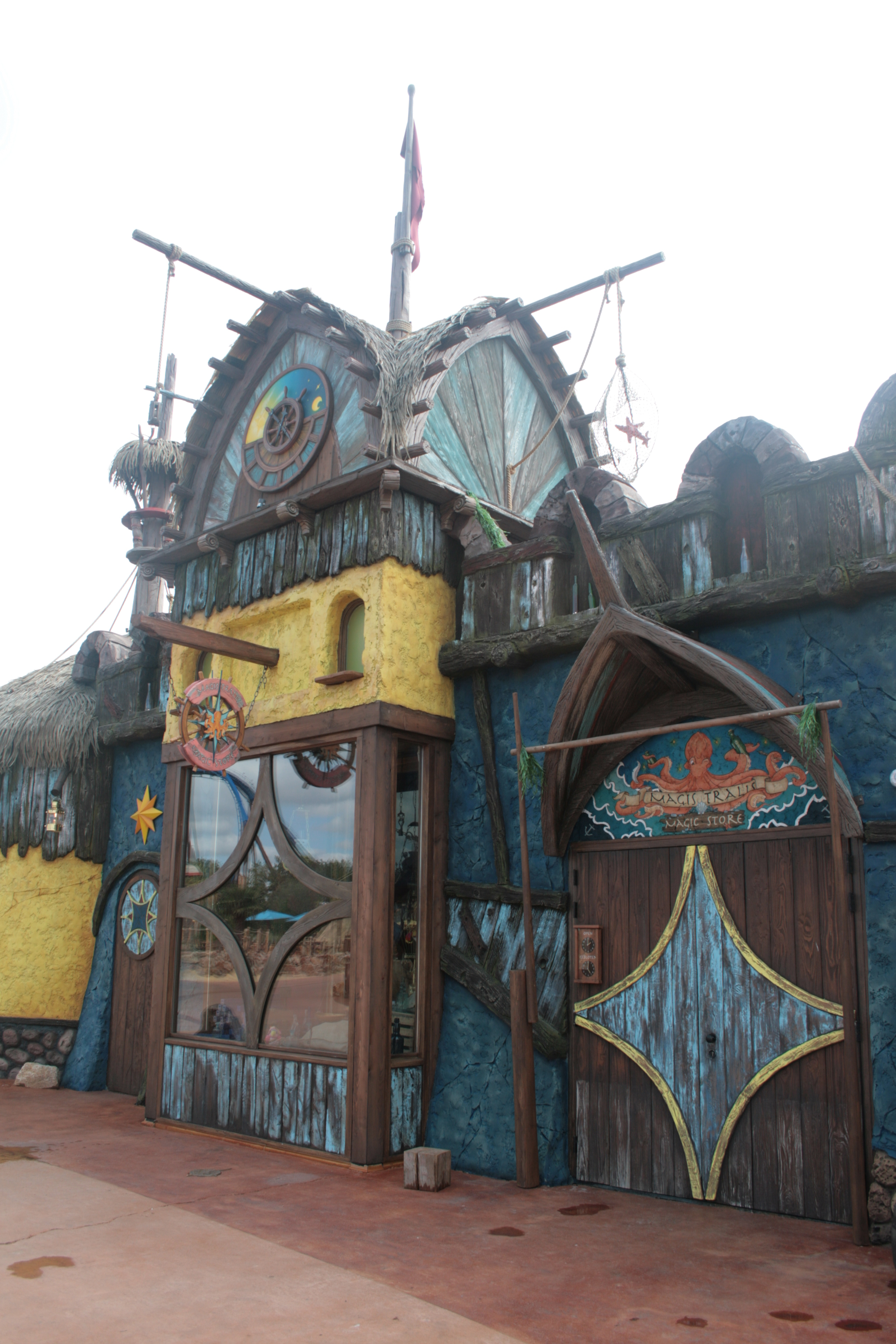
Architecture in Port Laguna

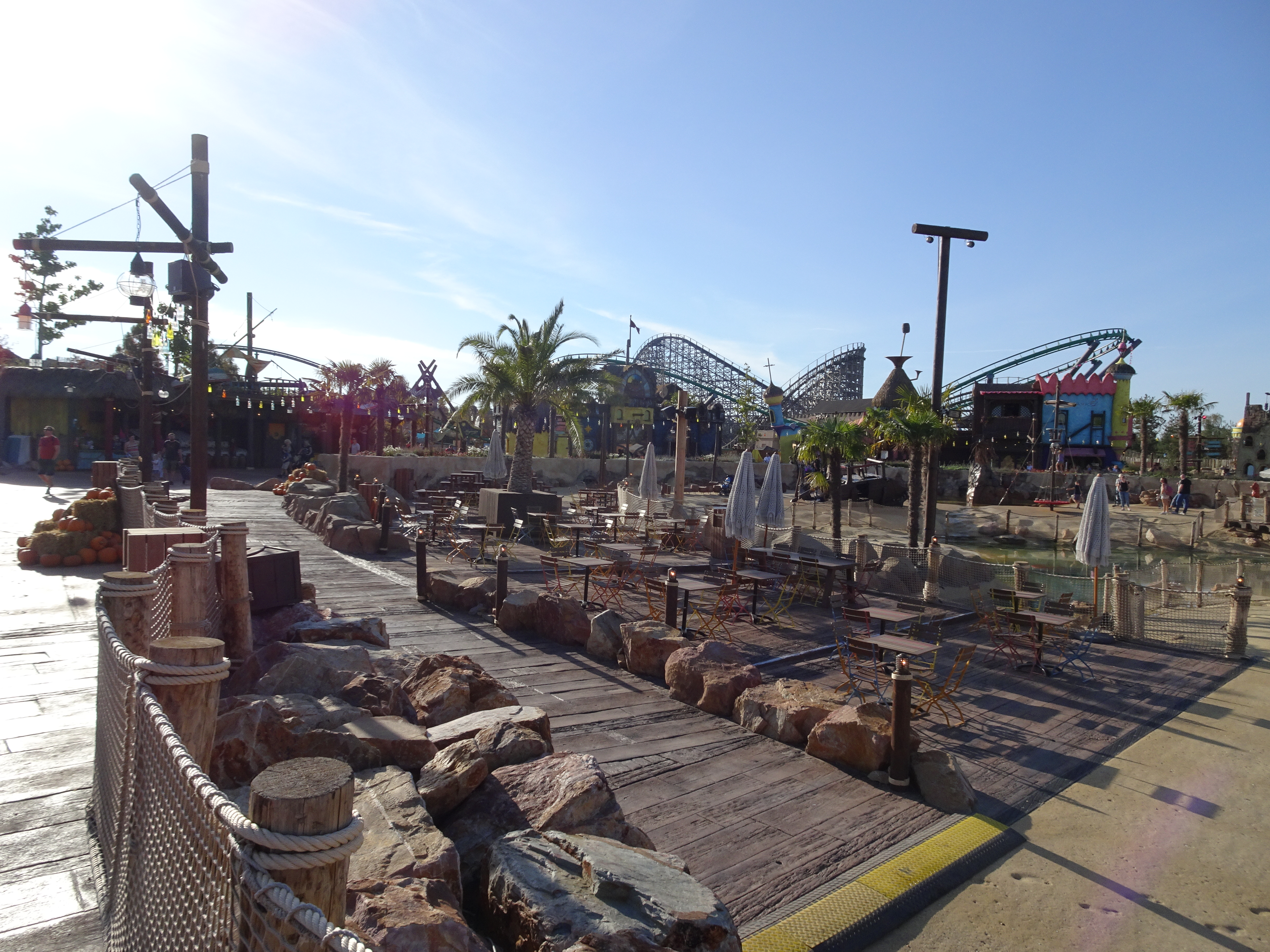
Terraces

=== Avalon ===
Avalon is the newest area in the park, opened in 2018. Based on the Arthurian legend, the area includes the Bolliger & Mabillard-built wing coaster Fēnix and the boat ride Merlin's Quest. In 2023, Avalon was expanded with a car ride and three flat rides.

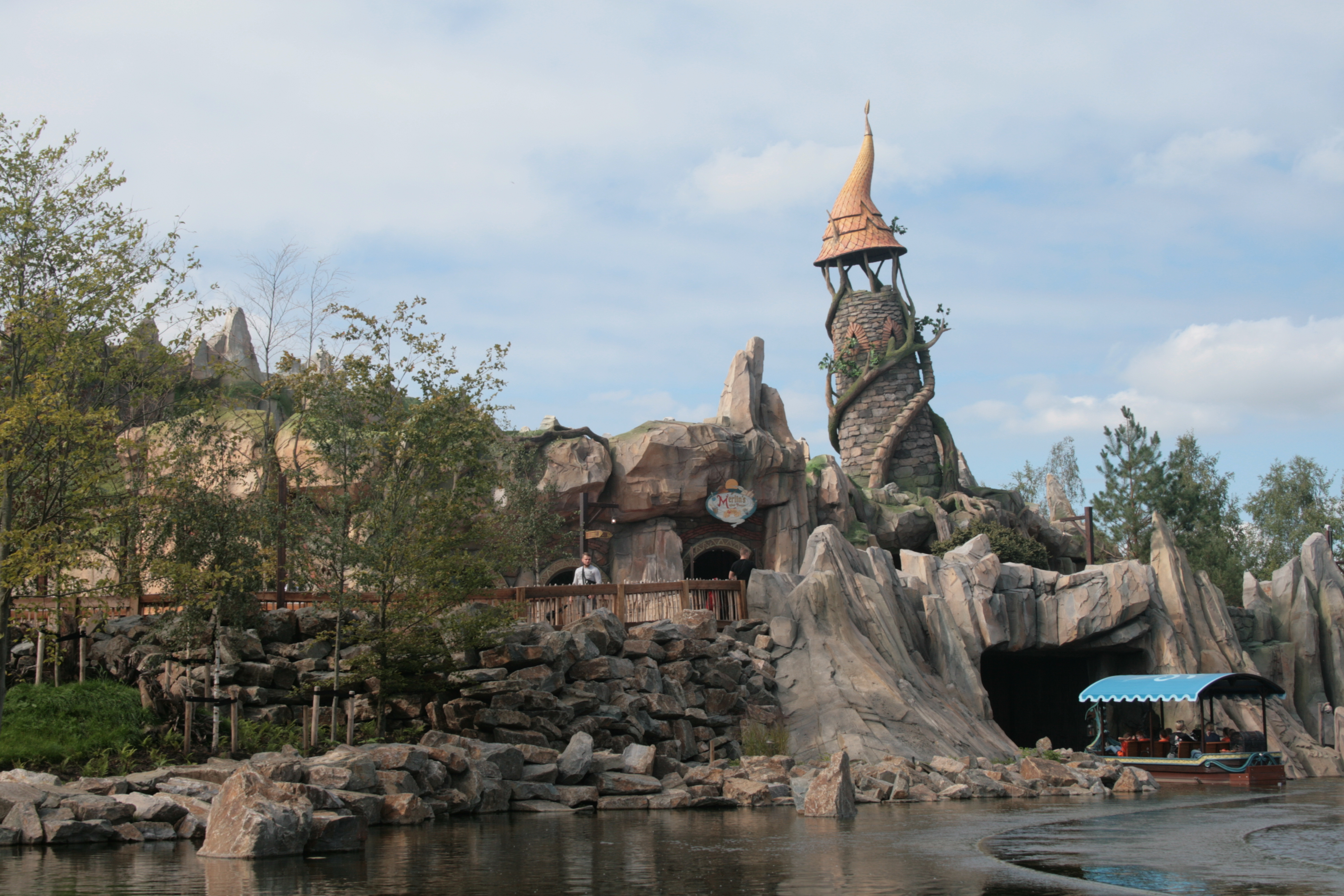
Show building of the dark ride section of Merlin's Quest.

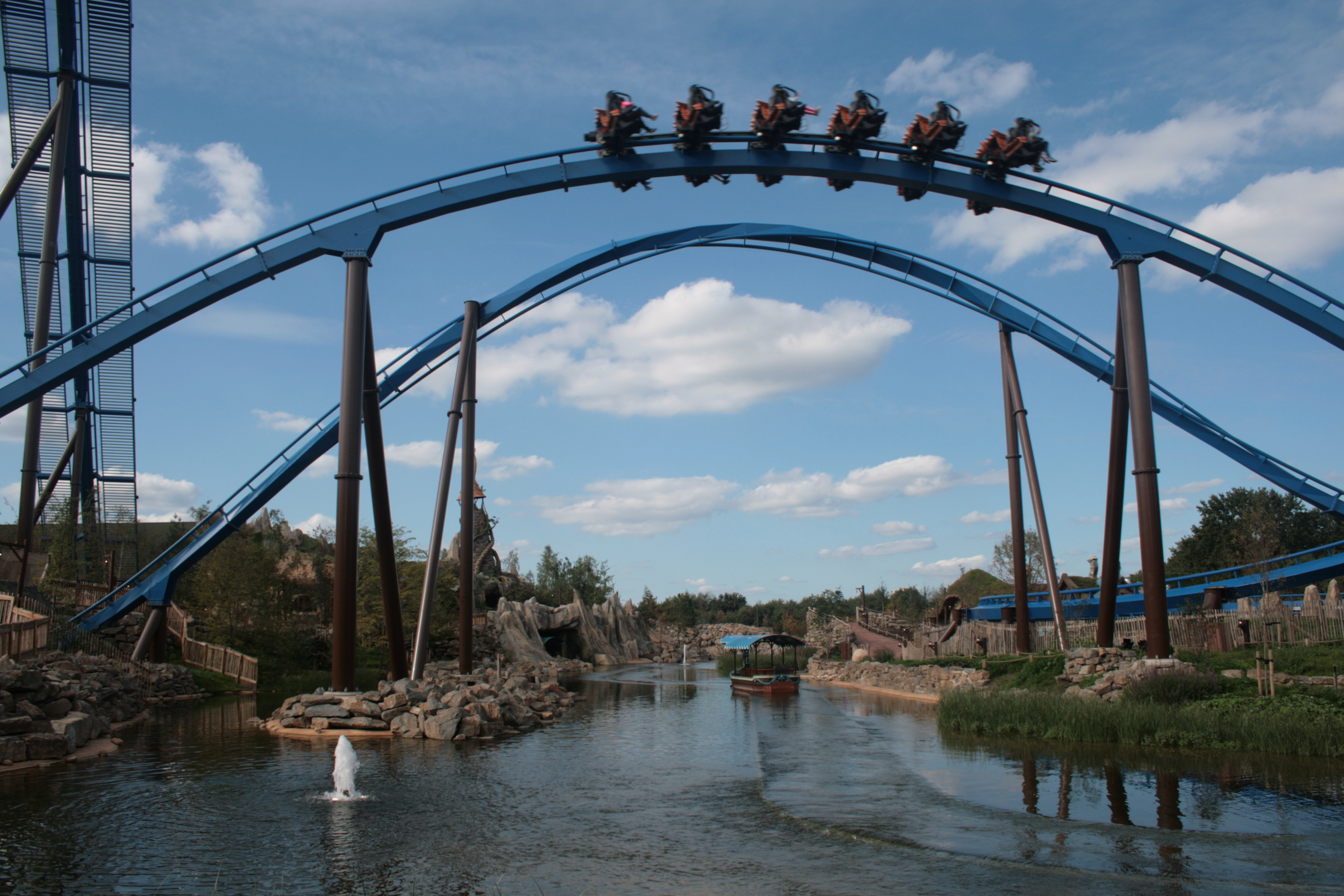
View at the lake.

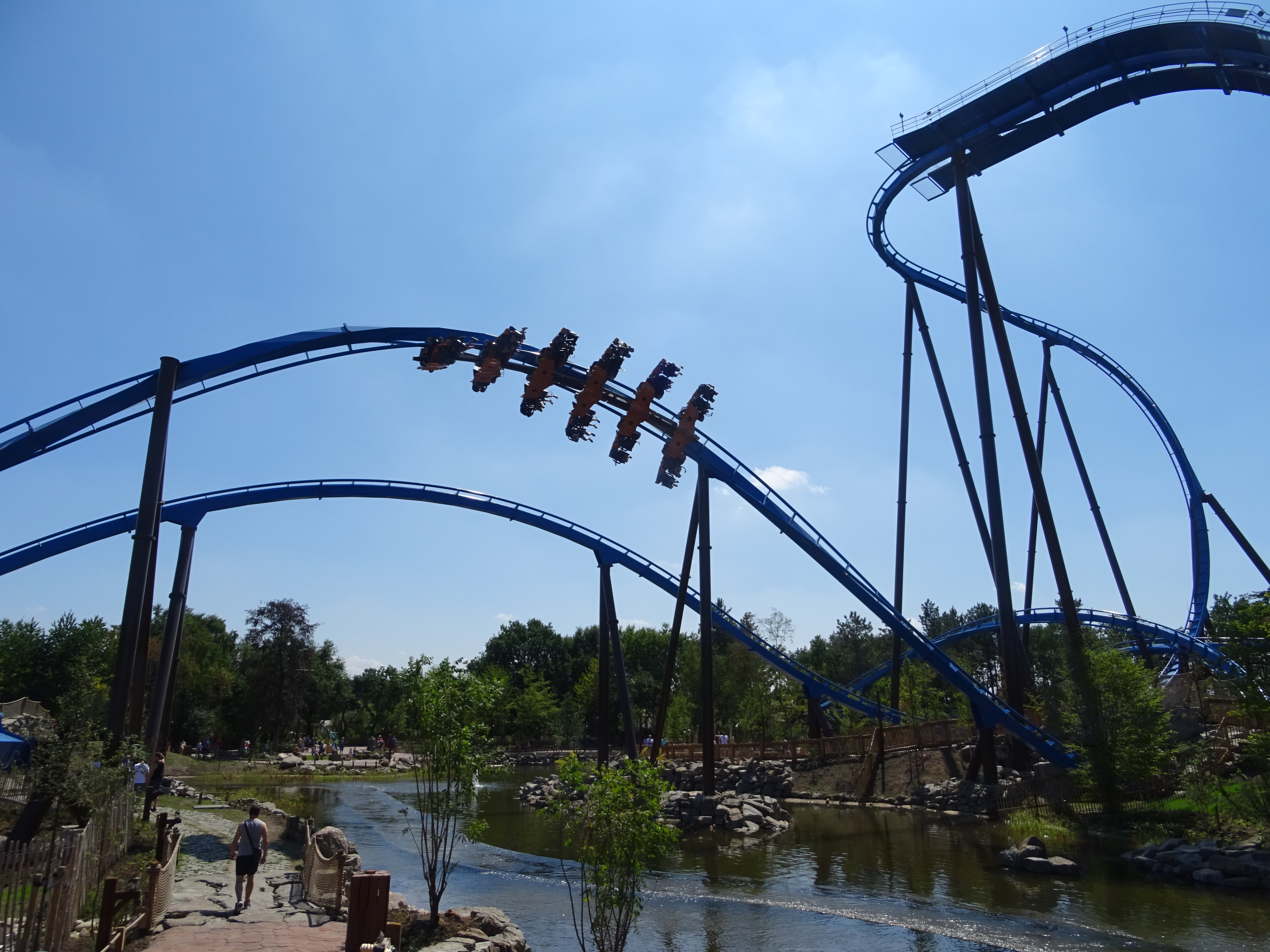
Roller coaster Fēnix.

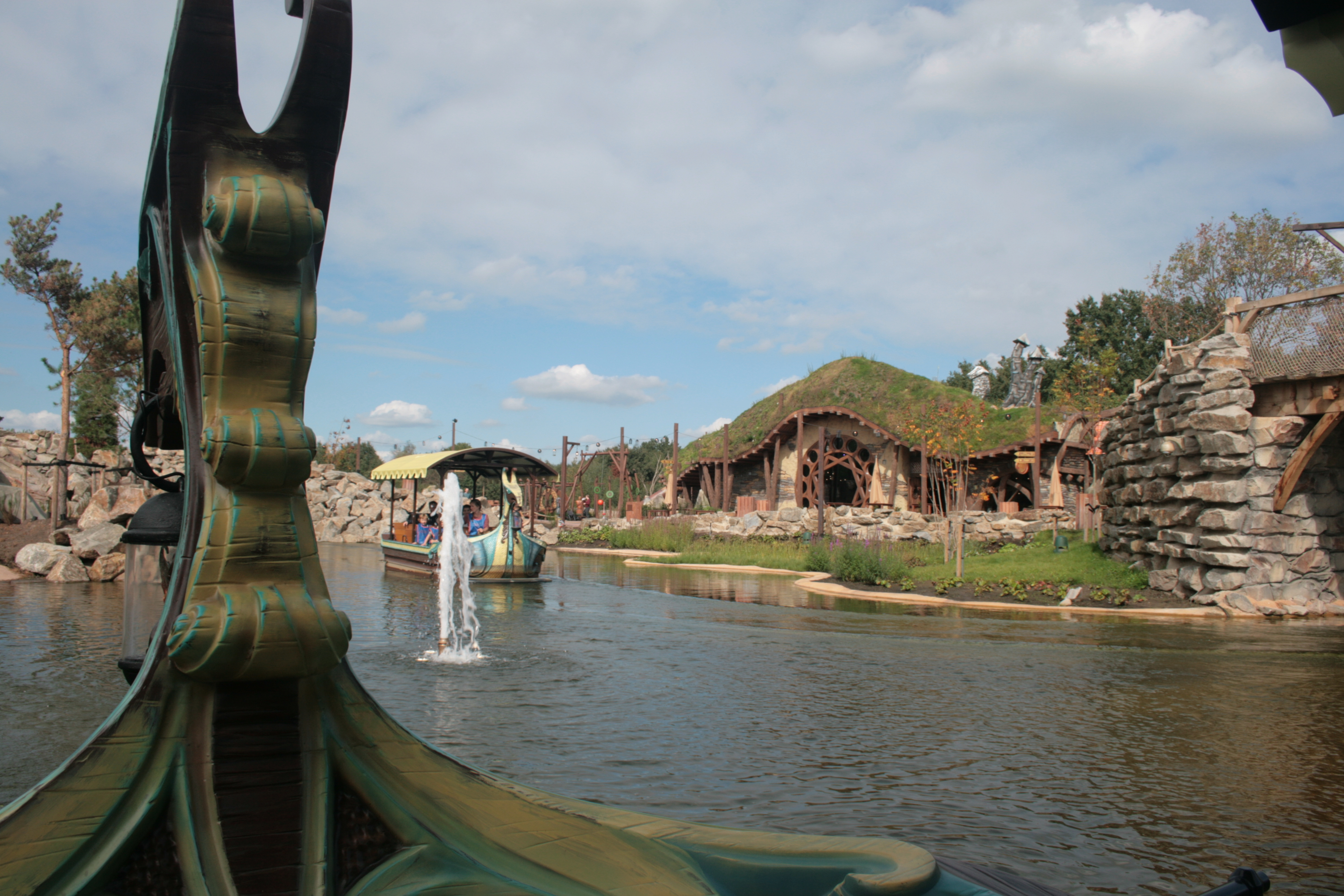
View from boat ride Merlin's Quest

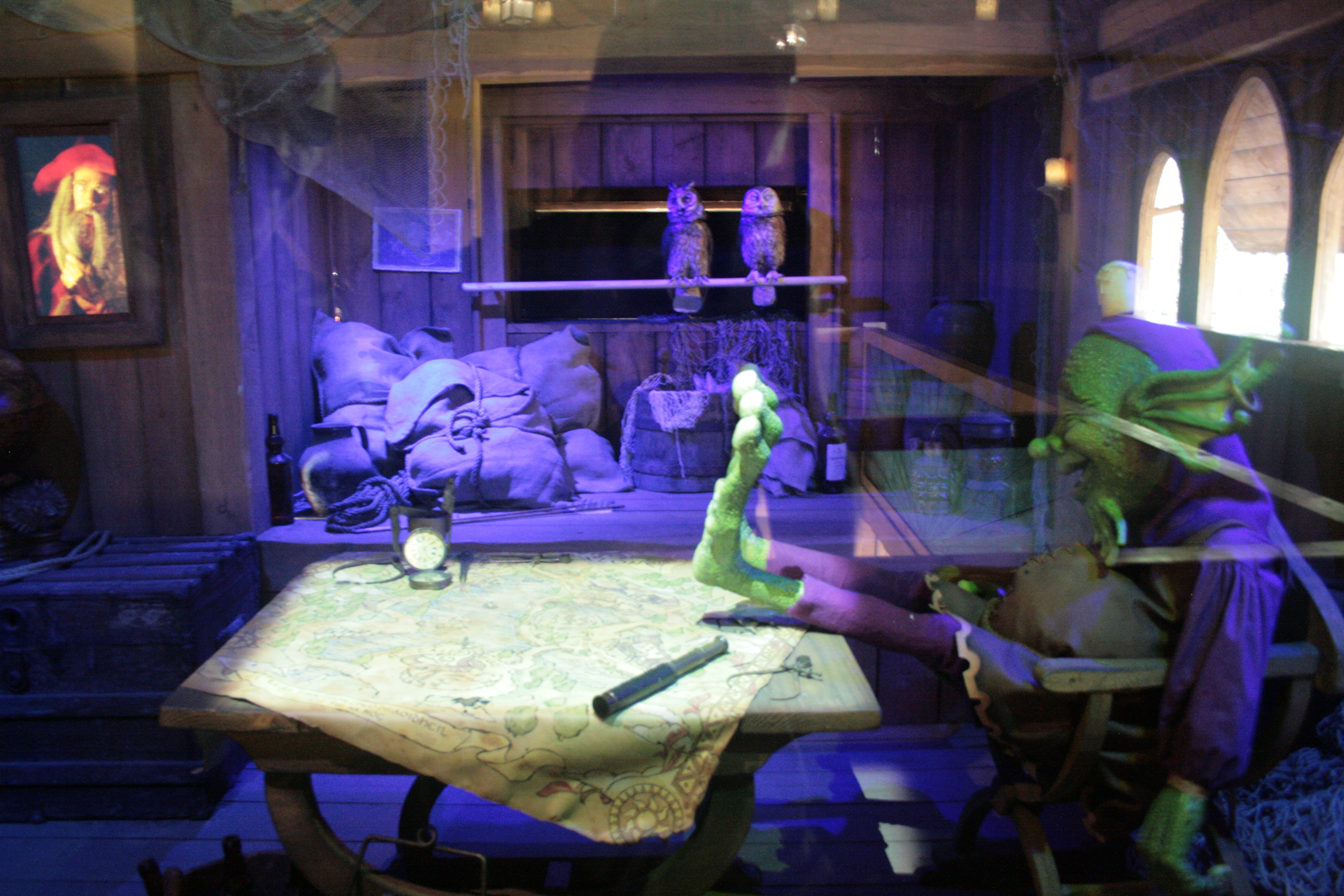
Decoration in the waiting area of Merlin's Quest.

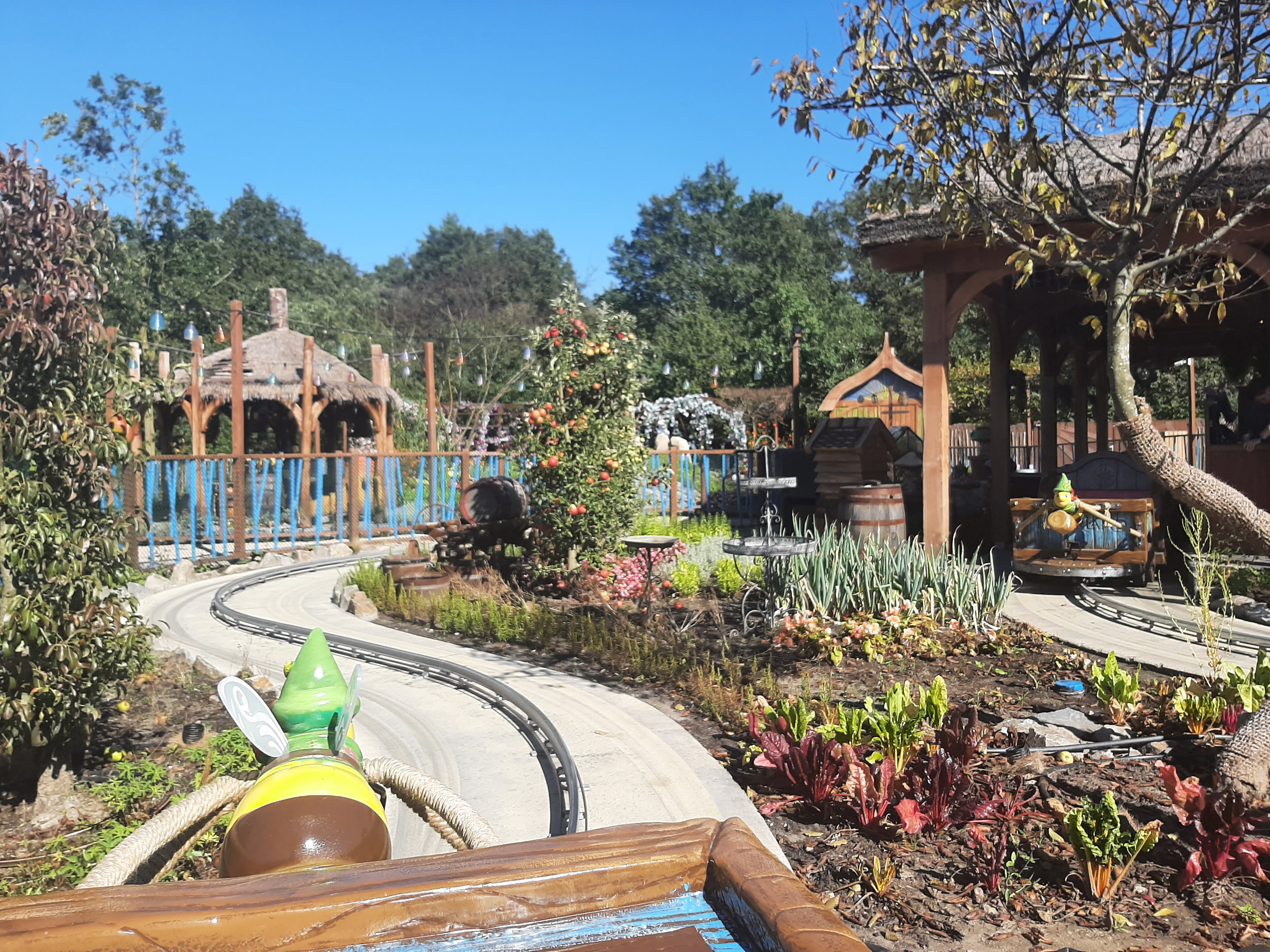
Car ride Garden Tour

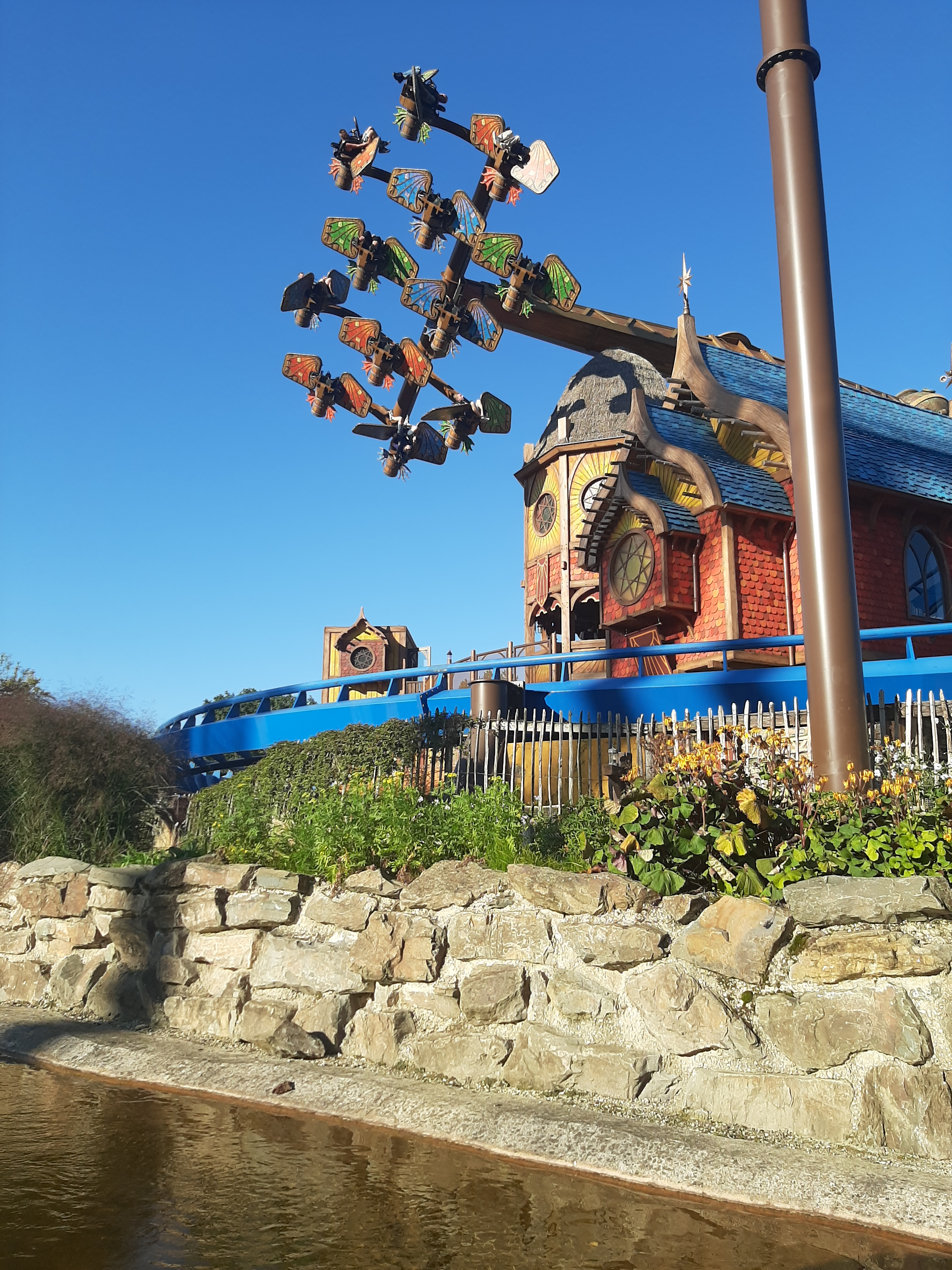
Sky Fly Pixarus

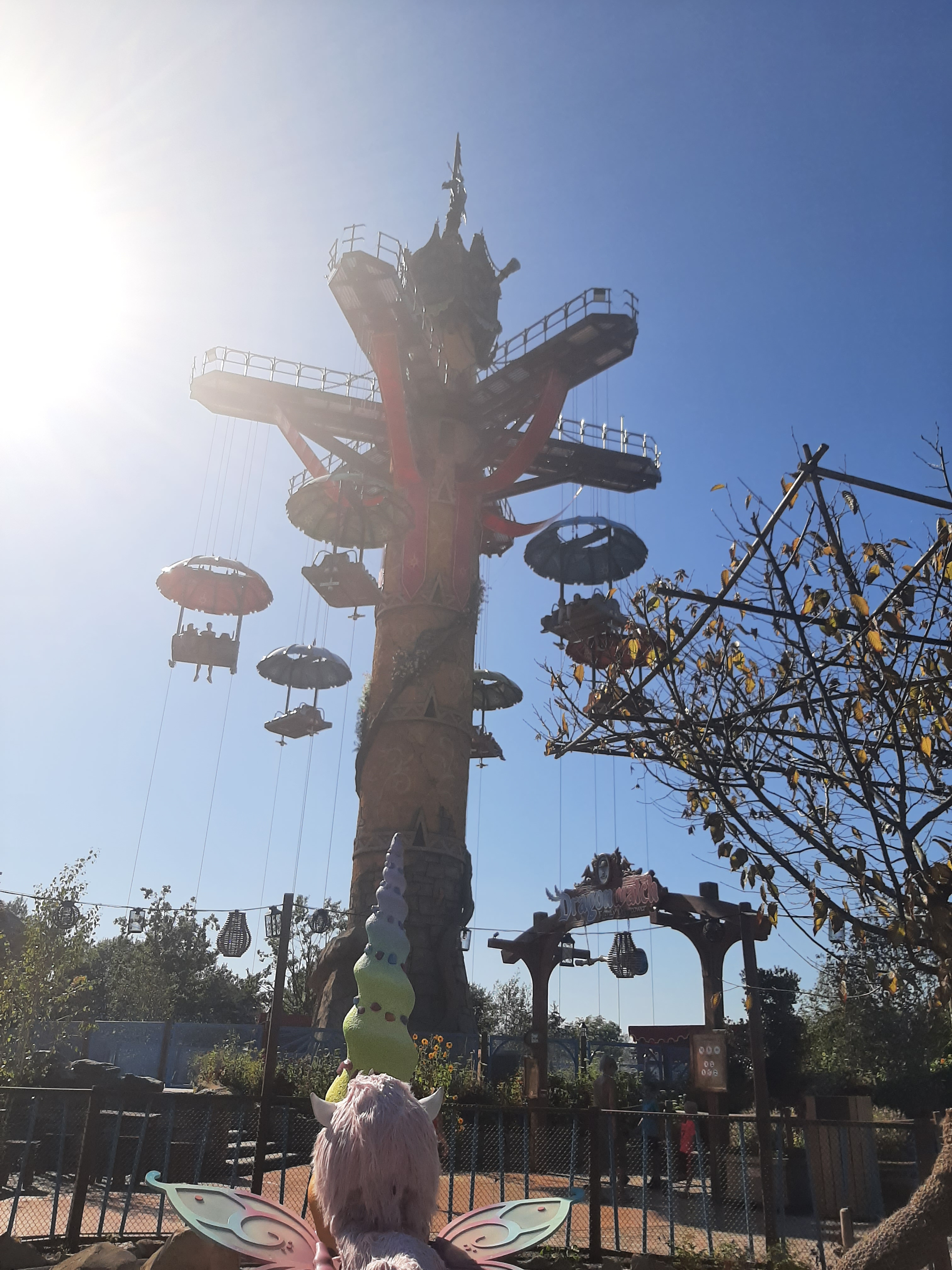
Parachute Tower Dragonwatch

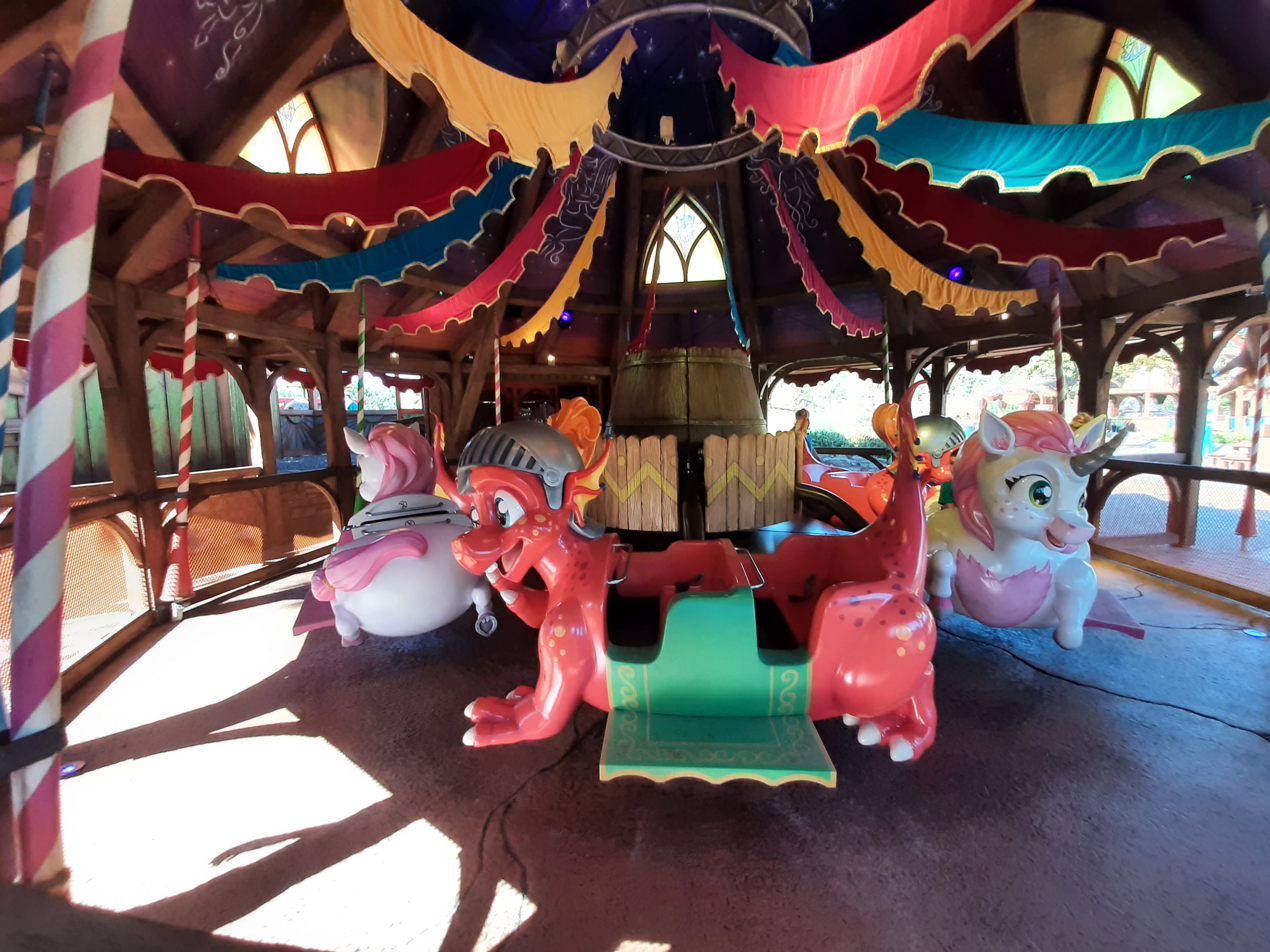
Carousel Jumping Juna

== Rides ==
=== Water rides ===
| Name | Type | Area |
|---|---|---|
| Aqua Snake; Hara Kiri | Water slide | Land van Toos |
| Djengu River | Rapid River | Magische Vallei |
| Expedition Zork | Log Flume | Wunder Wald |
| Merlin's Quest | Boat Ride | Avalon |

=== Roller coasters ===
| Name | Type | Manufacturer | Model | Opened | Status | Other statistics | Pictures |
|---|---|---|---|---|---|---|---|
| Toos-Express; Formerly Boomerang; Formerly Achtbaan | Steel | Vekoma | Junior Coaster (Custom) | 2001 | Operating | Length: 1,049.8 ft (320.0 m); Height: 39.3 ft (12.0 m); Speed: 37.3 mph (60.0 km/h) | |
| Booster Bike | Steel | Vekoma | Motorbike Coaster (600m) | 2004 | Operating | Length: 1,968.5 ft (600.0 m); Height: 49.3 ft (15.0 m); Speed: 46.6 mph (75.0 km/h) | |
| Troy | Wood | Great Coasters International | Wooden roller coaster | 2007 | Operating | Length: 3,534 ft (1,077 m); Height: 104.5 ft (31.9 m); Speed: 54 mph (87 km/h) | |
| Dwervelwind; Formerly d'wervelwind | Steel | Mack Rides | Spinning Coaster | 2012 | Operating | Length: 1,640.4 ft (500.0 m); Height: 65.6 ft (20.0 m); Speed: 43.5 mph (70.0 km/h) | |
| Fēnix | Steel | Bolliger & Mabillard | Wing Coaster | 2018 | Operating | Length: 2,667.4 ft (813.0 m); Height: 131.3 ft (40.0 m); Speed: 59 mph (95 km/h) | |

=== Other attractions ===
| Name | Type | Manufacturer | Opened | Area |
|---|---|---|---|---|
| Alpenrutsche; Formerly Swampie's Swing | Kontiki | Zierer | 2004 | Wunder Wald |
| Arthur's Tournament Training | Playground | Merry Go Round | 2018 | Avalon |
| Coco Bolo | Lifting tower | Heege | 2013 | Magische Vallei |
| Djinn | Wave Swinger | Wooddesign | 2015 | Land van Toos |
| Dragonwatch | Parachute Tower | Intamin | 2023 | Avalon |
| Dwaalhof | Maze | | 2001 | Land van Toos |
| Exploria Magica | Walkthrough | | 2020 | Port Laguna |
| Fort Boreas | Playground | Eibe Benelux | 2013 | Magische Vallei |
| Garden Tour | Car ride | Metallbau Emmeln | 2023 | Avalon |
| Jumping Juna | Jump Around | Zamperla | 2023 | Avalon |
| Karussell | Merry-go-round | Preston & Barbieri | 2001 | Wunder Wald |
| Kletterabenteuer | Slides | Kaiser + Kühne | 2005 | Wunder Wald |
| Kletterparcours; Formerly Survival-Parcours | Adventure park | Exponent | 2001 | Wunder Wald |
| Klimhoed | Climbing volcano | Sidijk | 2001 | Land van Toos |
| Klokhuis; Formerly Appelcarrousel | Caterpillar Train | SBF Visa Group | 2001 | Land van Toos |
| Little Dragons | Playground | Replay Speeltoestellen | 2023 | Avalon |
| Maximus' Blitz Bahn; Formerly Woudracer | Summer toboggan | Wiegand | 2004 | Wunder Wald |
| Maximus' Wunderball | Rolling ball sculpture | Monz Naturerlebnisanlagen | 2022 | Wunder Wald |
| Paarden van Ithaka | Electric horse riding track | Metallbau Emmeln | 2010 | Ithaka |
| Pixarus: Flight School of Magic | Sky Fly | Gerstlauer | 2023 | Avalon |
| Scorpios | Santa Maria | Metallbau Emmeln | 2010 | Ithaka |
| Sim sa la Klim | Volcano climb | Sidijk | 2001 | Land van Toos |
| Sparky's Splashdock | Water playground | Monz Naturerlebnisanlagen | 2023 | Avalon |
| Speelkasteel | Indoor Playground | Eibe Benelux | 2001 | Land van Toos |
| Speeltuin | Playground | Kaiser & Kühne | 2001 | Land van Toos |
| Theekopjes | Teacups | Zamperla | 2001 | Land van Toos |
| Tolly Molly | Carousel | Metallbau Emmeln | 2013 | Magische Vallei |
| Toverhuis | Magic Wand | Lagotronics | 2008 | Land van Toos |
| Truukjes | Convoy | SBF Visa Group | 2001 | Land van Toos |
| Villa Fiasko | Funhouse | Kumbak | 2004 | Wunder Wald |
| Villa Toverhoed | Walkthrough | Lagotronics | 2008 | Land van Toos |
| Vliegend Tapijt; Formerly Morrelhopper | Kiddie Tower | SBF Visa Group | 2002 | Land van Toos |
| Waku Waku | Water playground | VelopA | 2013 | Magische Vallei |
| Wirbelbaum; Formerly Twist & Turn | Flying Wheel | Metallbau Emmeln | 2005 | Wunder Wald |

== Visitors ==
| Year | Number of visitors |
|---|---|
| 2005 | 410,000 |
| 2006 | 465,000 |
| 2007 | 500,000 |
| 2008 | 525,000 |
| 2009 | 530,000 |
| 2010 | 495,000 |
| 2011 | 517,000 |
| 2012 | 520,000 |
| 2013 | 620,000 |
| 2014 | 673,000 |
| 2015 | 698,498 |
| 2016 | 682,932 |
| 2017 | 682,000 |
| 2018 | 812,000 |
| 2019 | 862.000 |
| 2020 | 534.000 |
| 2021 | 717.500 |
| 2022 | 1.032.000 |
| 2023 | 1.170.000 |
| 2024 | 1.174.000 |
| 2025 | 1.137.000 |
