= Fēnix (roller coaster) =

Roller coaster in Attractiepark Toverland, Netherlands

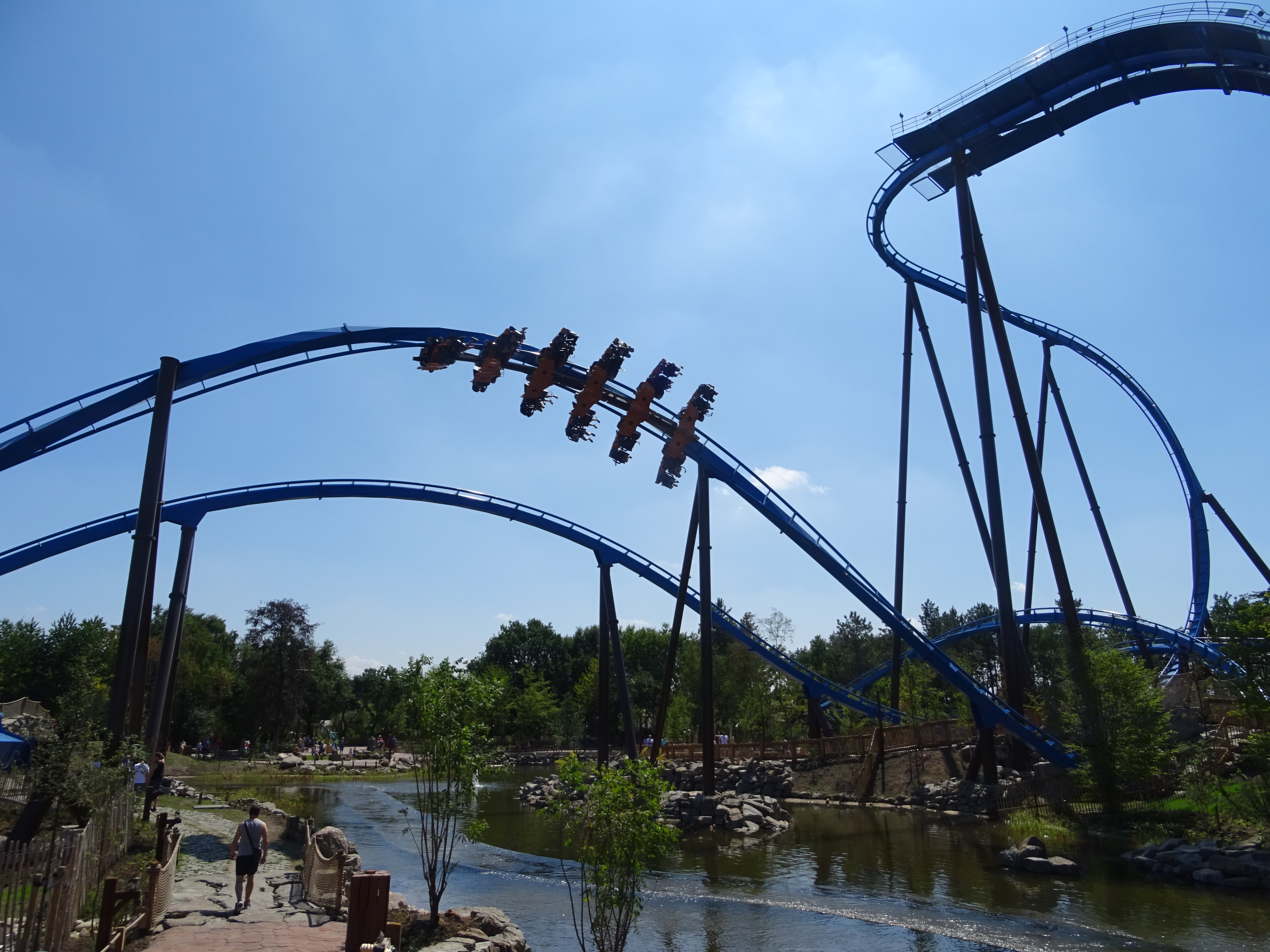
- Fēnix with a train in the zero-g roll

Toverland
- Location: Toverland
- Park section: Avalon
- Coordinates: 51°23′59″N 5°59′06″E
- Status: Operating
- Opening date: 7 July 2018
- Cost: €13,000,000

General statistics
- Type: Steel – Wing Coaster
- Manufacturer: Bolliger & Mabillard
- Model: Wing Coaster
- Lift/launch system: Chain
- Height: 131 ft (40 m)
- Length: 2,667 ft (813 m)
- Speed: 59 mph (95 km/h)
- Inversions: 3
- Duration: 1:45
- Capacity: 1,000 riders per hour
- G-force: 4,07
- Height restriction: 132–195 cm (4 ft 4 in – 6 ft 5 in)
- Trains: 2 trains with 6 cars. Riders are arranged 4 across in a single row for a total of 24 riders per train.
- Fēnix at RCDB

Fēnix is a steel Wing coaster located at Toverland in Sevenum, the Netherlands. It is a Wing Coaster manufactured by Bolliger & Mabillard. The attraction opened on 7 July 2018. Fēnix is as part of Avalon, a new area with a theme based on Celtic legends. It was also the first Wing Coaster in the Netherlands.

== Ride experience ==
Fēnix features a lift hill with a height of 40 metres (130 ft) and a layout with a length of 813 metres (2,667 ft). The ride has 3 inversions: a dive drop, an Immelmann, and zero-g roll.

As the train exits the station it takes a 180 degree right-hand turn before climbing the 40 metre (131 ft) chain lift hill. At the hill's crest, the train takes a 90 degree right hand turn before proceeding down the dive drop. Reaching speeds of 95 kilometres per hour (59 mph), the train travels over an airtime hill before entering an Immelmann loop. The train then enters a 360 degree right hand helix leading into a zero-g roll. Following the zero-g roll, the train travels through a headchopper and a series of banked turns before entering the brake run and station.

== See also ==
- 2018 in amusement parks
