= Iron Gwazi =

Roller coaster at Busch Gardens Tampa Bay

- Previously known as Gwazi (1999–2015)

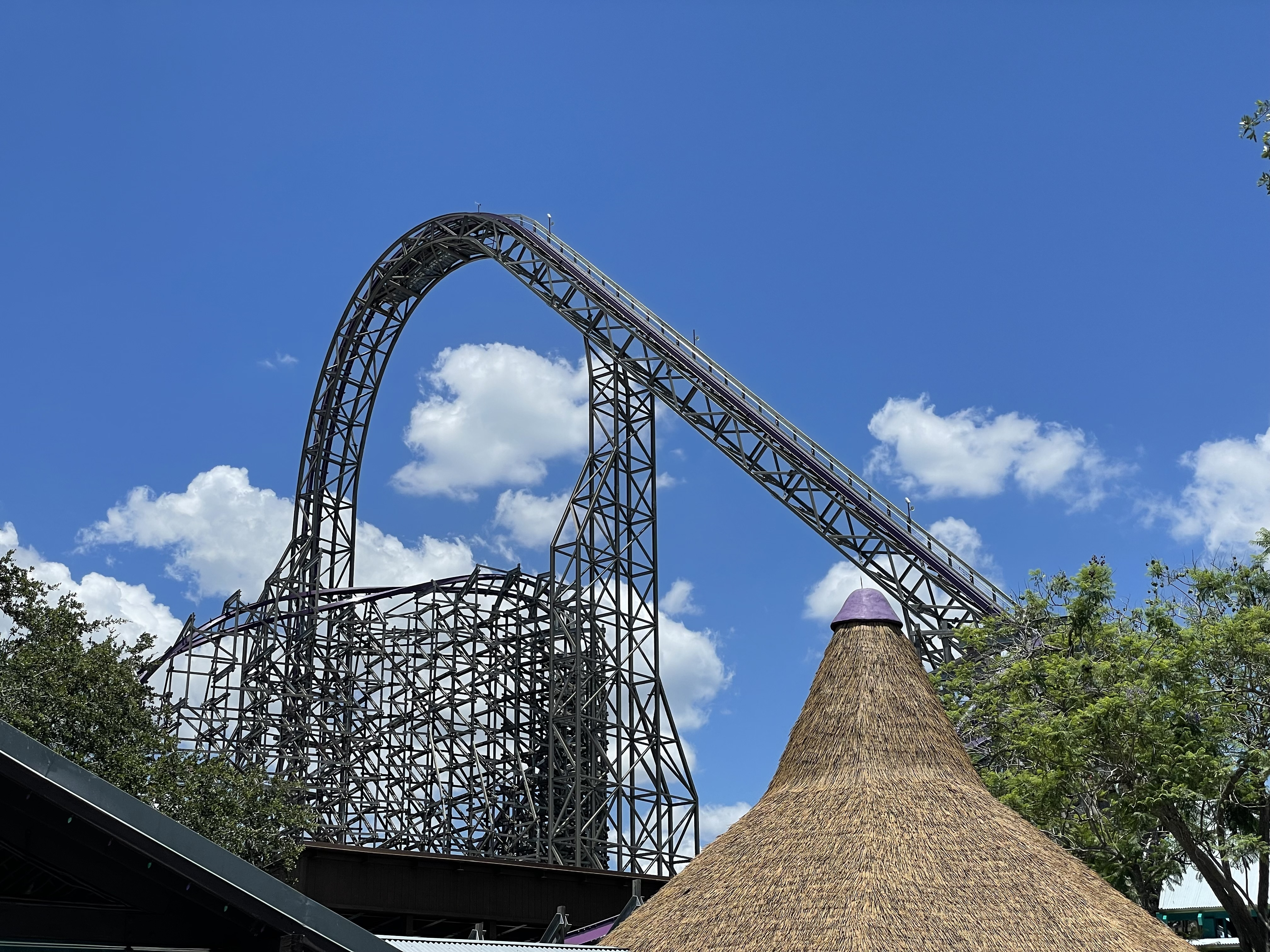
- Iron Gwazi's lift hill and barrel roll downdrop

Busch Gardens Tampa Bay
- Location: Busch Gardens Tampa Bay
- Coordinates: 28°02′02″N 82°25′23″W
- Status: Operating
- Soft opening date: February 13, 2022
- Opening date: March 11, 2022
- Replaced: Gwazi

General statistics
- Type: Steel – Hybrid
- Manufacturer: Rocky Mountain Construction
- Designer: Alan Schilke
- Model: I-Box track
- Track layout: Twister
- Lift/launch system: Chain lift hill
- Height: 206 ft (63 m)
- Drop: 206 ft (63 m)
- Length: 4,075 ft (1,242 m)
- Speed: 76 mph (122 km/h)
- Inversions: 2
- Duration: 1:50
- Max vertical angle: 91°
- Height restriction: 48 in (122 cm)
- Trains: 2 trains with 6 cars; riders arranged 2 across in 2 rows for a total of 24 riders per train
- Theme: Crocodile
- Quick Queue available
- Iron Gwazi at RCDB

Iron Gwazi (formerly called Gwazi) is a steel-track hybrid roller coaster at Busch Gardens Tampa Bay, a theme park in Tampa, Florida, United States. The renovated ride opened to the public on March 11, 2022, following a passholder soft-opening a month earlier on February 13. Development of the original Gwazi began in July 1998, when Busch Gardens announced that it would build a wooden roller coaster on land formerly occupied by the Anheuser-Busch brewery. Great Coasters International (GCI) built Gwazi, a wooden dueling roller coaster with two separate tracks. The ride's name refers to a mythical creature with a tiger's head and a lion's body. Trains riding on both tracks, respectively named Lion and Tiger, reached a height of 105.4 feet (32.1 m) and a maximum speed of 51 mph (82 km/h).

Gwazi received positive reviews from critics and the public when it opened on June 18, 1999. Over time, the wooden roller coaster became difficult to maintain, resulting in the Tiger side closing in 2012. Following rising maintenance costs and declining ridership, the Lion side was closed as well in 2015. The wooden structure sat dormant for several years, and the park considered several replacement attractions, including a remodeled roller coaster, an amphitheater, and a new attraction. The park indicated it would refurbish the wooden structure, and site preparation began in late 2018.

In 2019, Busch Gardens announced the replacement as Iron Gwazi, a steel version of the original with a single track. The park hired Rocky Mountain Construction (RMC) to retrofit the original wooden structure's layout. It was initially scheduled to open in 2020 but was delayed several times due to the COVID-19 pandemic and other issues. The refurbished ride opened as North America's tallest, steepest, and fastest hybrid roller coaster, featuring a height of 206 feet (63 m), a maximum speed of 76 mph (122 km/h), and a track length increase of 567 feet (173 m). Like its predecessor, Iron Gwazi debuted to positive reviews from critics, and it later won the 2022 Best New Roller Coaster category in Amusement Today magazine's annual Golden Ticket Awards.

== History ==
In October 1995, Anheuser-Busch announced the closure of its Tampa brewery, which had operated in the middle of Busch Gardens Tampa Bay since the park's inaugural year, 1959. The brewery closed in December and was demolished afterwards. To replace the brewery, the park chose a wooden roller coaster rather than one made of steel due to growing preferences for older-style attractions. The park wanted to differentiate itself from other Florida theme parks, which had modern ride technology.

Mark Rose, the park's vice president for planning and design, chose the builder for the wooden roller coaster after touring several amusement parks over 17 days. He made a shortlist of five roller coasters, seeking a prospective designer for a new Busch Gardens attraction, and eventually settled on Great Coasters International (GCI) for the project based on the company's Wildcat installation at Hersheypark. Officials for Busch Entertainment (later renamed SeaWorld Entertainment) confirmed the choice and signed GCI. Washington University in St. Louis helped research the new roller coaster name, Anheuser-Busch selecting Gwazi. The name Gwazi represents a mythical African lion with a tiger's head that struggles with inner conflict.

In early June 1998, Busch Gardens Tampa Bay considered adding a resort on site to compete with other Florida amusement parks, including a projected $10 million attraction scheduled to open in 1999. By mid-month, park owner Busch Entertainment filed a trademark for the name "Gwazi" with the United States Patent and Trademark Office. Busch Gardens announced its plan to add a pair of dueling wooden roller coasters named Gwazi on July 15, with groundbreaking taking place that day. The dueling roller coasters would be built as the park's fifth roller coaster, the two tracks themed to a "Lion" and "Tiger" to correspond with the respective dueling theme. The announcement also revealed that GCI would be building the roller coaster. The Tampa Tribune ran pictures of the hills under construction in November. Gwazi was reported to have been re-designed several times during construction. By April 1999, it was near completion, and testing began in May.

=== Operation ===
To promote the opening of Gwazi, park officials sold "first ride" tickets for the preview event in June 1999; of the 5,700 tickets sold, 3,500 went to Busch Gardens Tampa Bay passholders. Approximately 500 members of American Coaster Enthusiasts were in attendance. Construction of the roller coaster's theming and removal of excess wood were ongoing during the preview event. Gwazi opened the next day as Florida's first dueling wooden roller coaster and the first wooden roller coaster at any Busch Entertainment park. Busch Gardens promoted the attraction as the largest and fastest dueling wooden roller coaster in the southeastern United States.

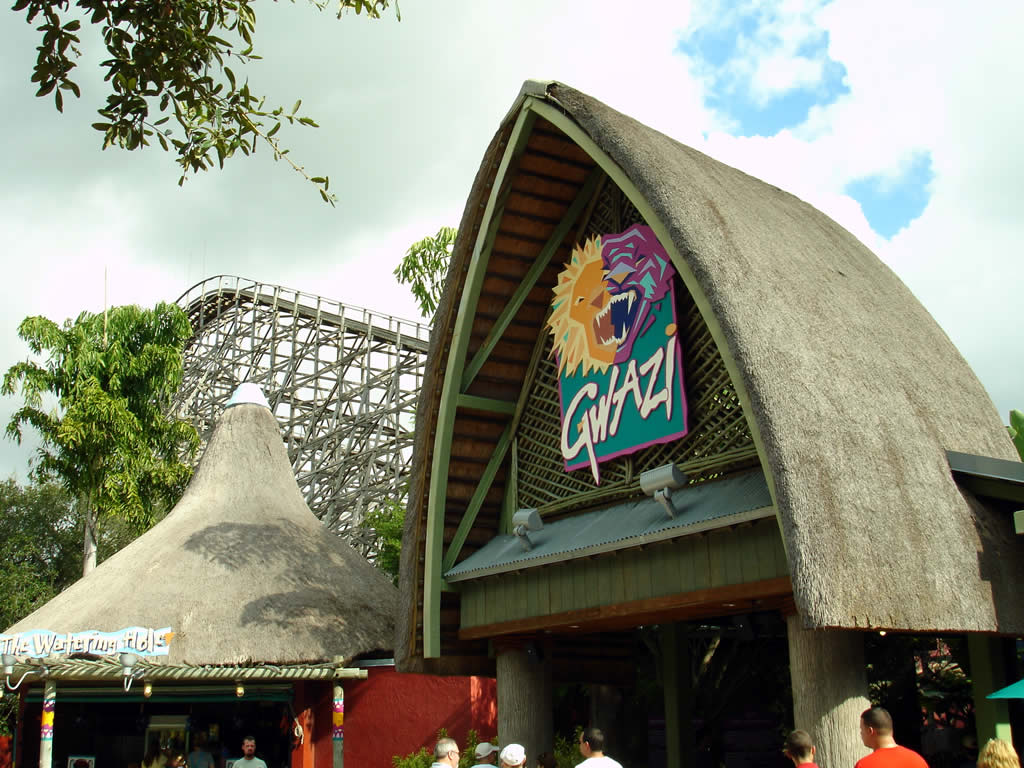
The original Gwazi's entrance and Lion's lift hill in 2006

Gwazi developed a reputation for delivering a rough ride over time despite regular maintenance. The Lion's track was replaced with new wood in 2009, and the Tiger side re-tracked the following year. After both tracks were refurbished, the last part of the renovation included the installation of four GCI-designed Millennium Flyer trains in 2011 to replace the trains originally supplied by Philadelphia Toboggan Coasters (PTC). Even with re-tracking and new trains, the wooden roller coaster remained difficult to maintain, and ridership continued to decrease. The Tiger side closed following the 2012 season, and soon after, the park built a pedestrian bridge across its loading platform; one of its trains was relocated to the Lion track.

The closure of the Tiger side prompted rumors from amusement park enthusiasts that Gwazi's operation would be terminated in the near future. In December 2014, Busch Gardens Tampa Bay confirmed the closure of the remaining Lion side due to low attendance, operating costs, and negative guest feedback. Gwazi's last train dispatched in February 2015. The trains were relocated and used on rides at other SeaWorld park locations, including InvadR at Busch Gardens Williamsburg and Texas Stingray at SeaWorld San Antonio. SeaWorld Entertainment repurposed wooden planks from the structure within the same park and at other properties, including SeaWorld Orlando.

=== Refurbishment and relaunch ===
Rose, vice president of park services, stated there were no plans for the Gwazi site after its closure, although the park was considering possible replacement attractions. A park spokesperson added that engineers discussed adding new elements, manufacturing steel parts, or completely demolishing the structure. In the three years after the closure, rumors circulated about a possible replacement of the wooden structure, speculating it could be a remodeled roller coaster, a new attraction, or an amphitheater. During a September 2018 news conference announcing the park's ninth roller coaster, Tigris, officials said there were construction plans for Gwazi in 2020. The same day, SeaWorld Entertainment applied to trademark the name "Iron Gwazi".

An internal SeaWorld Entertainment presentation was leaked online to the public in October 2018, which showcased several projects under development across its parks, including a replacement ride for Gwazi as a "high-thrill hybrid roller coaster". Later in the same month, Busch Gardens filed a demolition permit with the city of Tampa for parts of the Gwazi site. In December, updated construction-permit applications sent to the city of Tampa listed Rocky Mountain Construction (RMC) as the ride manufacturer of an upcoming attraction in the Gwazi area. Site preparation and construction started in late 2018 for an attraction code-named "BGT 2020".

In March 2019, the park announced Gwazi's replacement with a hybrid roller coaster conversion by RMC. Busch Gardens promoted the attraction as North America's steepest, fastest, and tallest hybrid roller coaster. By August 2019, the placement of the roller coaster's track had begun. Busch Gardens revealed the following month that the roller coaster would be named "Iron Gwazi" and that it would be 206 feet (63 m) tall with a 91-degree drop and a maximum speed of 76 mph (122 km/h). During the 2019 International Association of Amusement Parks and Attractions (IAAPA) Exposition in November, RMC unveiled the trains for Iron Gwazi. RMC completed track work on March 8, 2020, and testing began the next day.

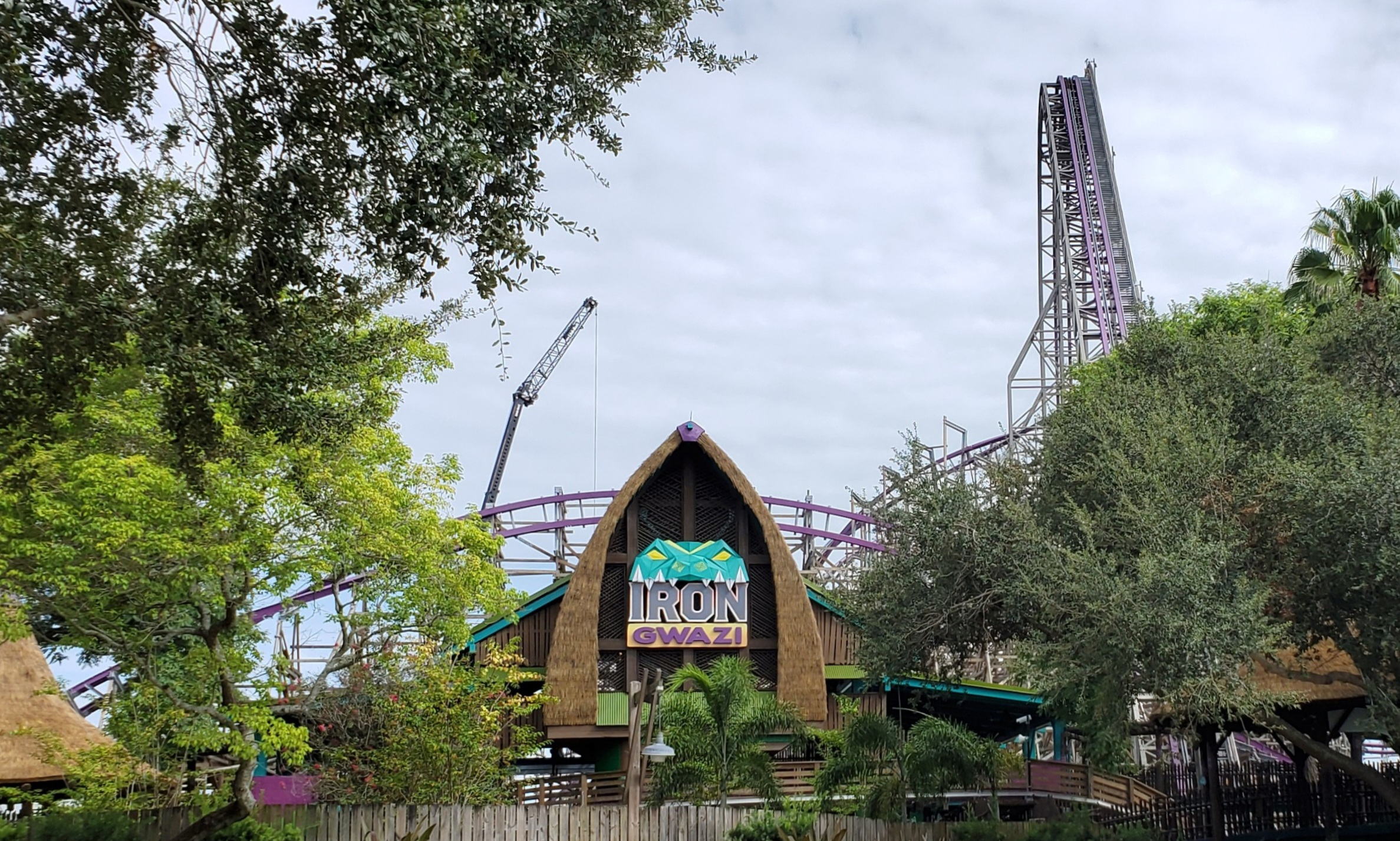
Iron Gwazi under construction in July 2020

Due to the COVID-19 pandemic, the initial opening date was missed, and testing halted after a week. RMC filed a lien against SeaWorld in May 2020 for $3.5 million of the $9 million the company said it was owed for work on Iron Gwazi, delaying further construction. As a result of the pandemic, SeaWorld Entertainment's preliminary second-quarter results for 2020 incorporated several approaches to reorganize its assets, one plan being to postpone the opening of all 2020 attractions to the following year. The park said in September that it scheduled to open Iron Gwazi in 2021, and it released a point-of-view video of the roller coaster two months later. In August 2021, Busch Gardens postponed Iron Gwazi's launch date a second time, to 2022.

In January 2022, the park specified a final launch date in March of that year. The park hosted a media preview for Iron Gwazi in February. The roller coaster soft opened for passholders on February 13, and it opened to the general public on March 11. Iron Gwazi debuted as the tallest hybrid roller coaster in North America, as well as the fastest and steepest hybrid roller coaster in the world. Iron Gwazi and Zadra at Energylandia, another RMC-built roller coaster located in Poland, are tied as the tallest hybrid roller coasters worldwide.

== Ride experiences ==
=== Gwazi ===
The ride experience of both the Lion and Tiger sides of Gwazi followed similar paths to each other when dueling. The park promoted Gwazi as the first dueling coaster with six "fly-bys", in which the two roller coaster trains passed each other in opposite directions at high speeds, giving the false impression they would collide. One cycle of each ride took approximately 2 1/2 minutes.

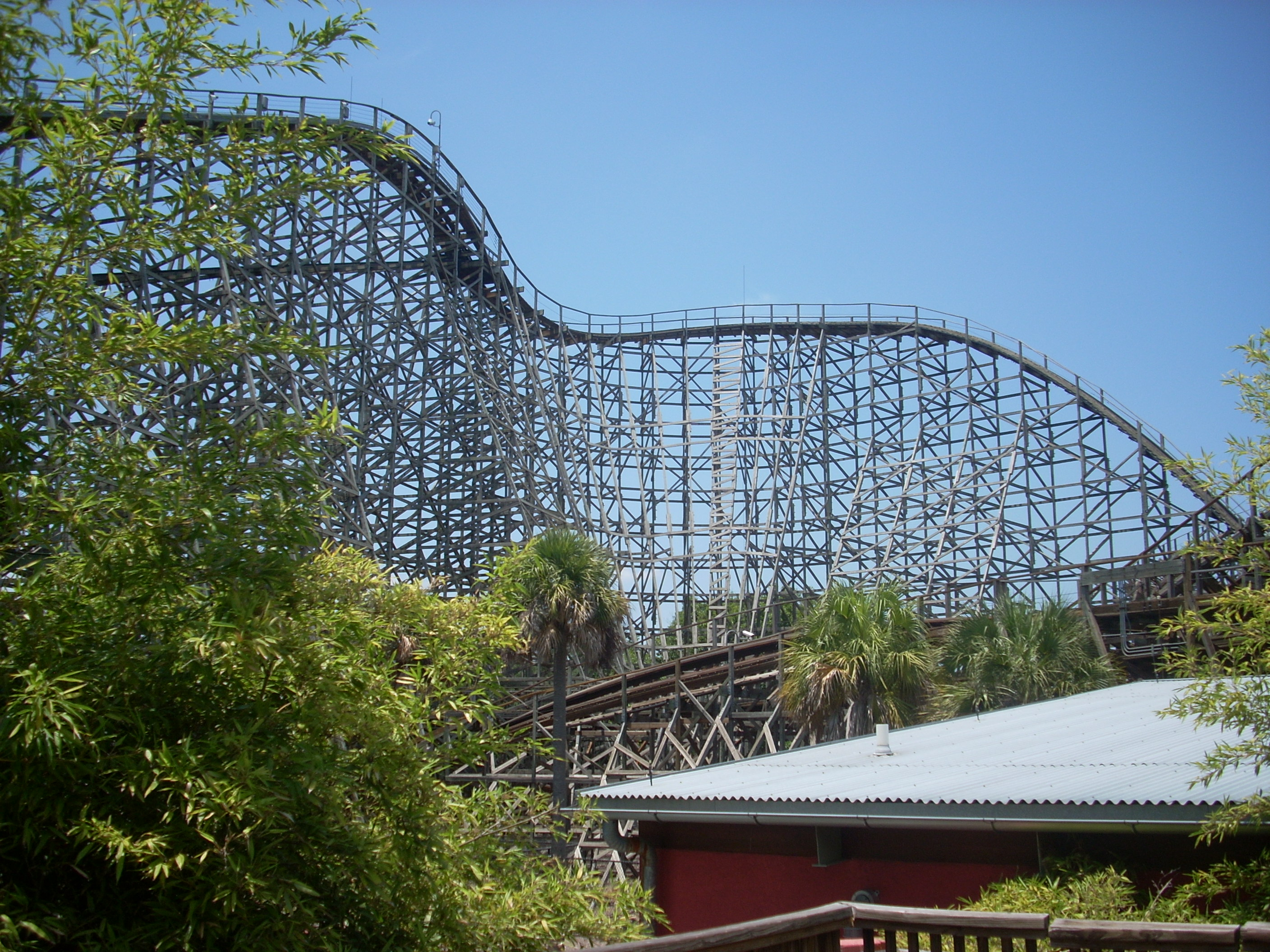
Lift hill of the Lion track

After leaving the station, the Lion train moved forward dipping into a right-handed U-turn to pass the other train. The train climbed slightly to the left and ascended the 105.4 ft (32.1 m) lift hill. At the top, the train dipped slightly into a pre-drop, turned right, and then descended 91.8 feet (28.0 m), reaching its maximum speed of 51 mph (82 km/h) near the bottom. The train banked slightly right before ascending into a left-banked turn through the lift hill of the Tiger side, exiting downward and entering a right-banked turnaround. The train then banked up into a left turn, next traversing downward into the outer region of the layout, making multiple, slightly banked right turns. Afterward, the train entered a series of hills parallel to the opposite train, passing by the station, then banking leftward into a downward spiral. The train descended, rising into a slight right turn, transitioning into a left turn and into the brake run. Completing the course, the train then turned right and then slightly left, returning to the station.

The Tiger train departed the station, moved forward into a slight right turn, then dipped into a U-turn to the left to pass the other train. It climbed slightly to the left to ascend the 105.4 ft (32.1 m) lift hill. At the top, the train entered a pre-drop, turning left and descending 91.8 ft (28.0 m), reaching its maximum speed of 51 mph (82 km/h) near the bottom. The train slightly banked right to ascend into a banked right turn followed by a drop. Continuing the banked angle, it climbed, dipped, and climbed again into a left-banked turn, traversing a series of curves before turning toward the outer region of the layout in multiple, slightly banked left turns. The train then entered a series of hills, running parallel to the opposite train, passing by the station, and turning right down a banked spiral. It descended slightly, then rose into a slightly banked left turn, moving into a right turn, and finishing at the brake run. Completing the course, the train turned left and slightly right, returning to the station.

=== Iron Gwazi ===
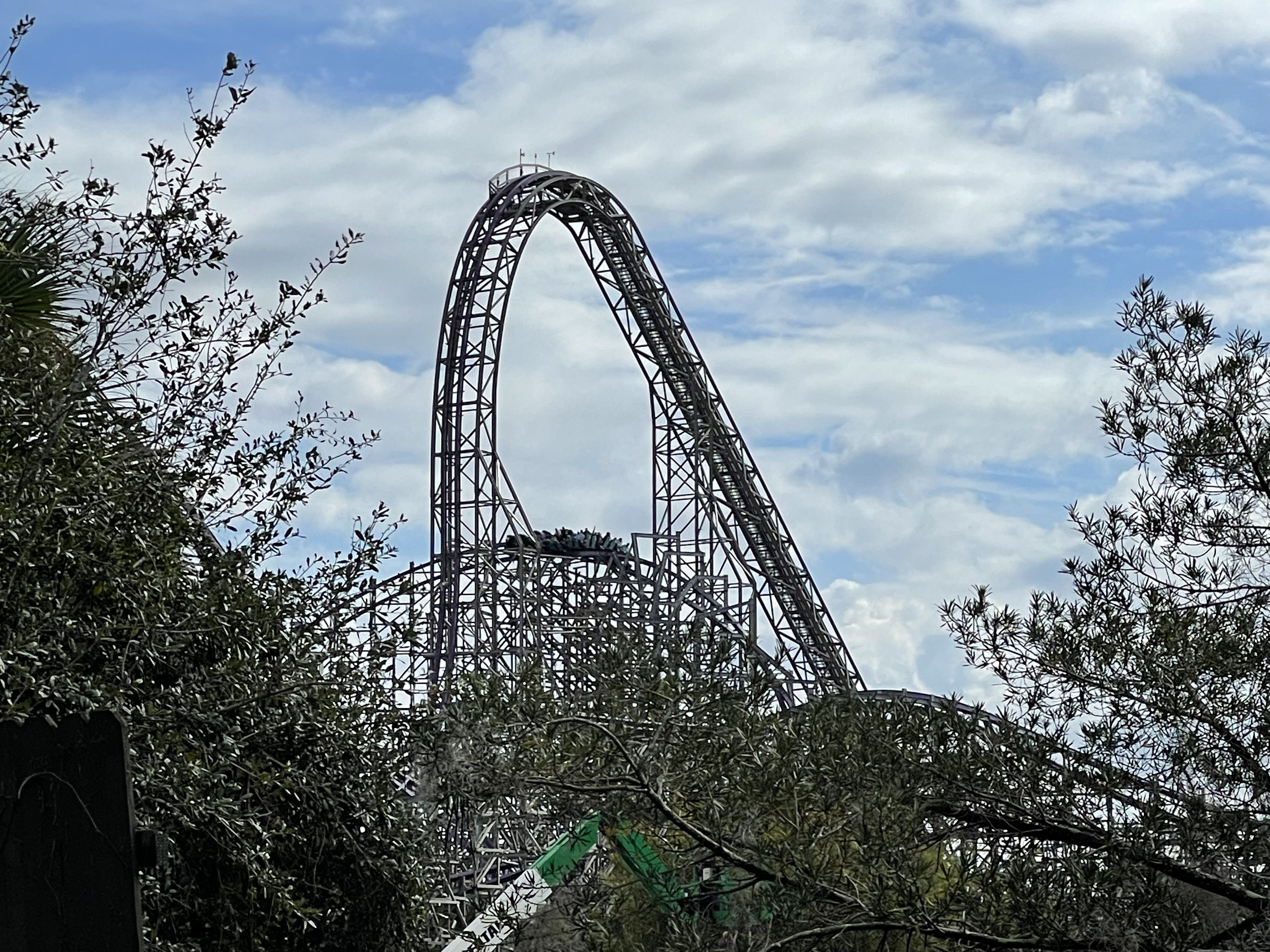
The lift hill of Iron Gwazi, with a train in the downward barrel roll

Iron Gwazi begins with a sharp left-hand turn, followed by a descending turn leading to the 206 ft (63 m) lift hill. As the train crests the hill, it slows down before descending its 91-degree drop, reaching its top speed of 76 mph (122 km/h). The train then climbs a hill and banks in the opposite direction making an outer-bank turn, returning downward in a left-hand turn and upwards to the right. Reaching the apex of the hill, the train navigates through a barrel roll downdrop, followed by an overbanked turn to the left. The train climbs above the station and banks outward to perform an extended wave turn until flattening out. The train continues to climb a series of left-curved hills, transitioning into a zero-g stall. Completing the stall, the train traverses a small outer-banked hill and continues into a series of upward-curved hills to the right. Iron Gwazi finishes with a turnaround into a hill and a left turn into the final brake run. Upon completion, the train makes a left turn passing the car barn, and a last right turn before entering the station. One cycle of the roller coaster takes about two minutes to complete.

== Characteristics ==
=== Wooden roller coaster ===
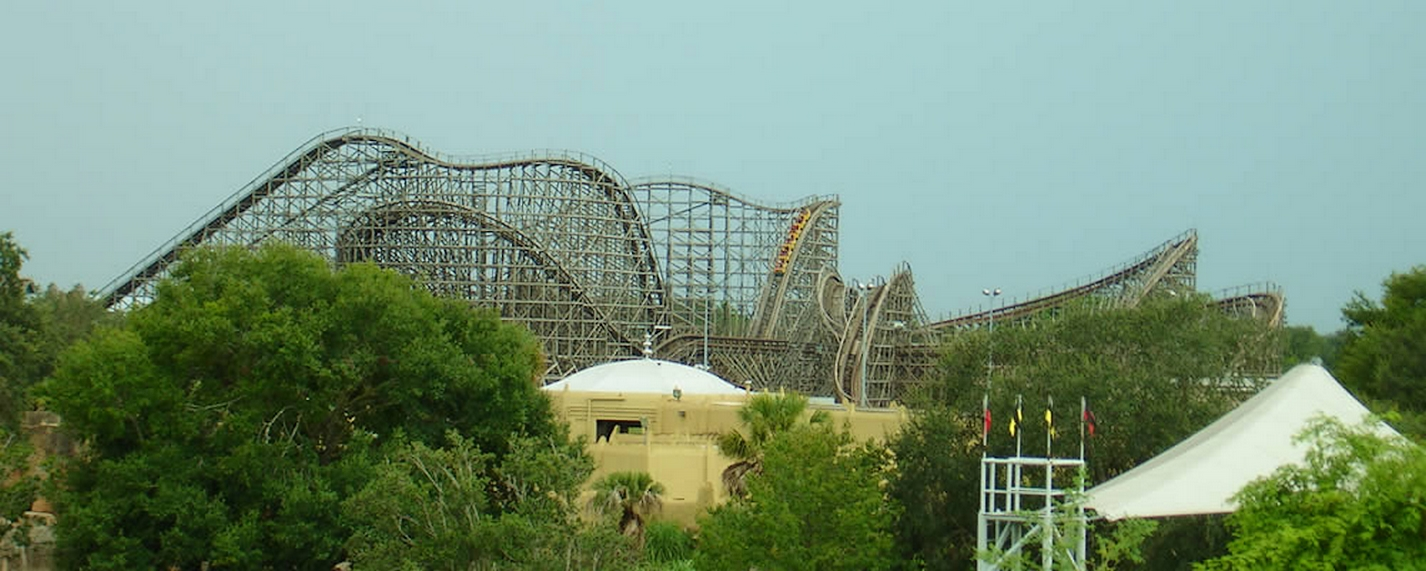
Gwazi from the Skyride in 2006

Gwazi covered eight acres (3.2 ha) previously occupied by the brewery. Gwazi was Great Coasters International (GCI)'s third project. The individual wooden tracks were 3,508 ft (1,069 m) long, and the maximum height of each side was 105.4 feet (32.1 m). GCI built the wooden roller coaster with 1.25 million board feet (2,900 m^{3}) of treated southern yellow pine, two million bolts, and 4.4 million nails. Its tracks consisted of 20-foot-long (6.1 m), 2-by-12-foot (0.61 by 3.66 m) planks in eight layers. The wooden structure could withstand 100 mph (160 km/h) winds without riders. Gwazi was given a sealant coat, instead of traditionally being painted, to blend in with the park's African theme.

Gwazi was originally supplied with six-car PTC trains arranged in two seats of two rows each. According to designer Mike Boodley, GCI offered their new Millennium Flyer trains, but Busch Gardens did not want to use an unproven design. After the 2011 season, the park replaced the PTC trains with Millennium Flyer trains. The park moved the roller coaster's sensors to accommodate the new trains, modified the rollback system, and implemented a new release system for the restraints. The four GCI trains consisted of 12 cars, each with a single row of two seats. Both the PTC and GCI trains could accommodate 24 riders, and they featured a lap-bar restraint system.

The two Gwazi tracks were named Lion and Tiger. Lion trains were mainly yellow, and Tiger trains were mostly blue. Gwazi was themed to the struggle between two territorial wildcats: the African lion and the Asian tiger. The surrounding plaza was similarly themed for each cat; the Lion side included desert-like environs, and the Tiger side had landscaping and streams.

=== Steel roller coaster ===
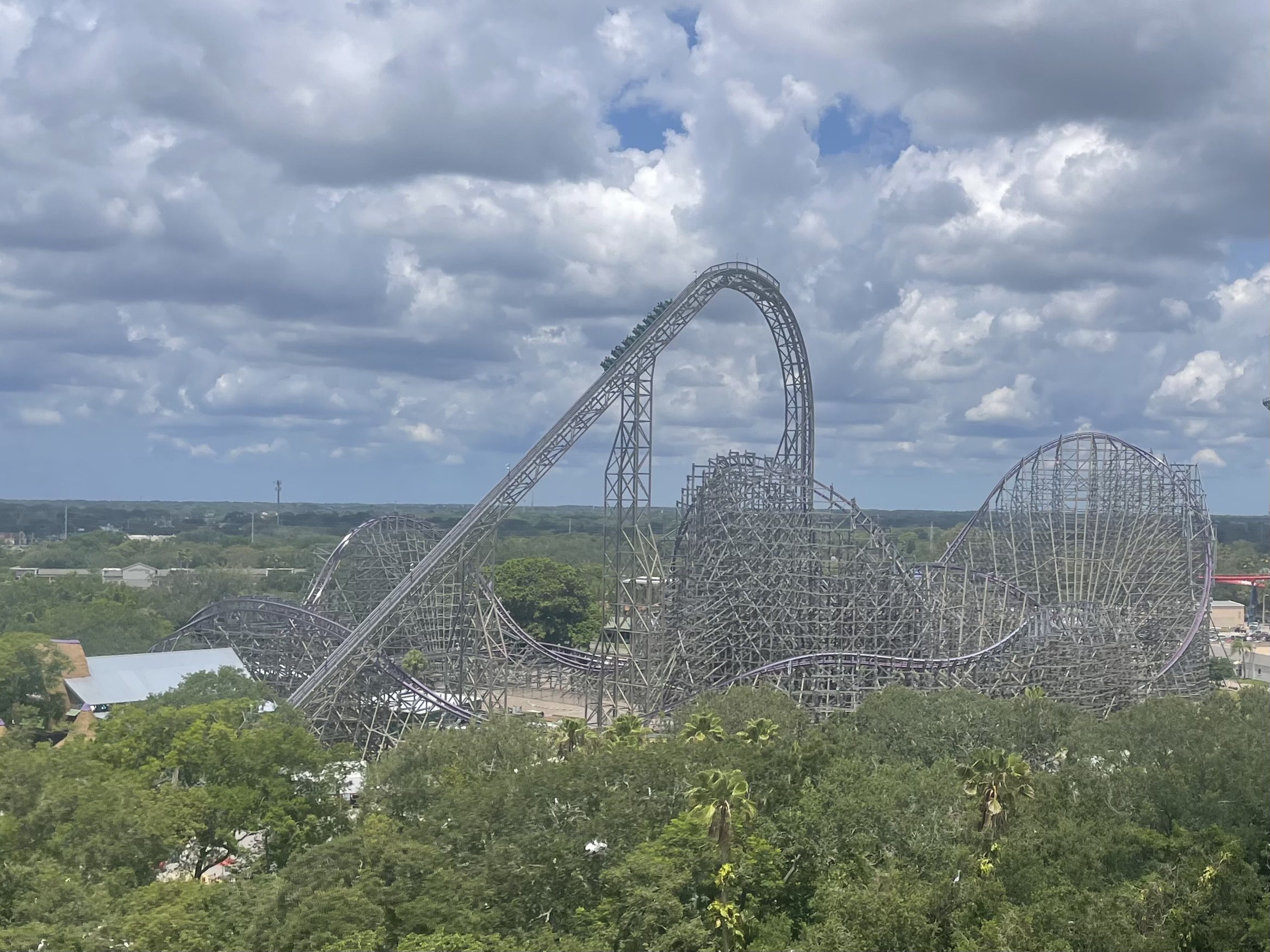
An overview of Iron Gwazi in 2023

Iron Gwazi was designed and built by RMC using portions of the original dueling roller coasters, and used the steel I-Box track created by Alan Schilke. Busch Gardens reutilized parts of the previous infrastructure for the steel roller coaster, using Gwazi's loading station. Andrew Schaffer, the park's director of design and engineering, stated, "about 25 percent of the original wooden structure has been re-utilized, and 75 percent of the foundations". RMC added another 375,000 board feet (880 m^{3}) of lumber for structural support and reconstructed the entire lift hill with steel rather than reusing the wooden structure. The steel track reaches a total length of 4,075 feet (1,242 m), adding 567 ft (173 m) from its predecessor.

The roller coaster's theme is the crocodile, similar to other attractions at the park that carry animal motifs. The queue area has educational elements about the reptile and their conservation, with crocodile-themed graphics painted throughout. Iron Gwazi operates with two six-car RMC trains. Each car has two seats in two rows, accommodating up to 24 riders per train. Riders are secured with lap-bar restraints. The lead car features the rendition of a crocodile's head; its trains are green, purple, and blue. The track has a purple color scheme.

=== Comparison ===
Statistics	Gwazi		Iron Gwazi
Years	1999–2012 (Tiger); 1999–2015 (Lion)		2022–present
Manufacturer	Great Coasters International		Rocky Mountain Construction
Designer	Mike Boodley		Alan Schilke
Track	Wood		Steel
Height	105.4 ft or 32.1 m		206 ft or 63 m
Drop	91.8 ft or 28.0 m		206 ft or 63 m
Length	3,508 ft or 1,069 m		4,075 ft or 1,242 m
Speed	51 mph or 82 km/h		76 mph or 122 km/h
Duration	2:30		1:50
Inversions	0		2
Max vertical angle	—N/a		91.0°
Trains	PTC (1999–2011)	GCI (2011–2015)	Rocky Mountain Construction

== Reception and legacy ==
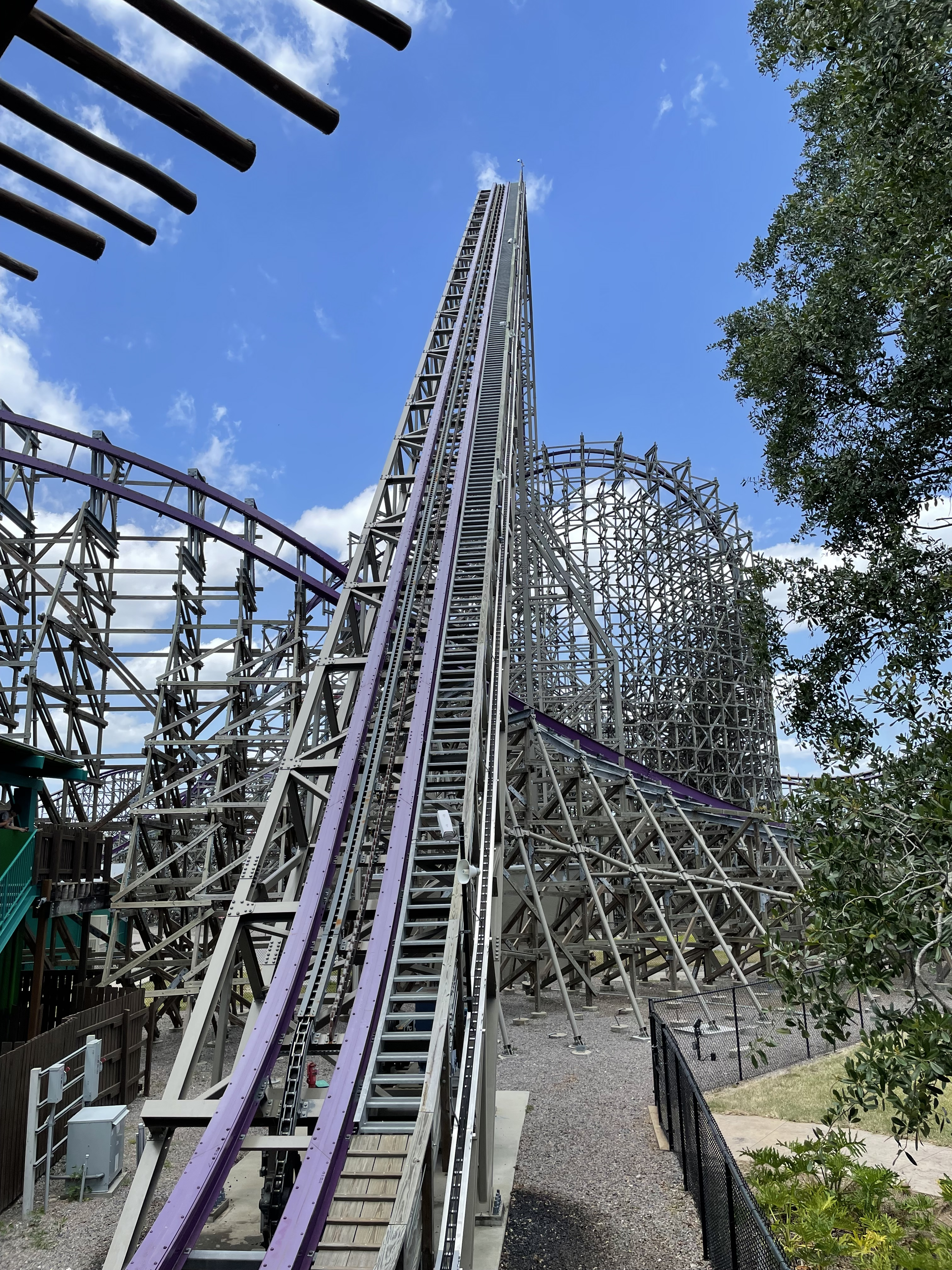
Lift hill of Iron Gwazi track

Gwazi received generally positive reviews upon its debut in 1999. In a St. Petersburg Times report, guest reactions to the roller coaster were positive, many commenting on its twists and turns, air time, and smoothness. In writing for The Tampa Tribune, Levin Walker noted among guests that Gwazi was praised for its speed and initial drop; some riders positively commented on the partial rattle typical of wooden roller coasters. An editor for Park World, Paul Ruben, stated that Gwazi had "everything a good coaster should have", adding "it never slows down".

The opening of Gwazi coincided with the debuts of several other major roller coasters at Florida theme parks, including Dueling Dragons and The Incredible Hulk Coaster at Universal Islands of Adventure, as well as the Rock 'n' Roller Coaster at Disney-MGM Studios. Gwazi was one of several wooden roller coasters that opened in North America during a resurgence of interest in vintage-style attractions. Gwazi opened one month after the steel dueling roller coaster Dueling Dragons. Dueling Dragons and Gwazi were frequently compared because of their dueling feature.

The rebuilt Iron Gwazi garnered positive reviews by critics on its debut in 2022. Writing for the Tampa Bay Times, Sharon Kennedy Wynne described it as "glass-smooth" and noted its many air time moments. Wynne went on to highlight the "build-up to the beyond-vertical drop" as "slow and terrifying", with the restraint system being of "some comfort" for air time. Dewayne Bevil of Orlando Sentinel pointed out Iron Gwazi's anticipation and sustained pacing. Bevil further commented on the "relentless nature" of its pacing being the attraction's appeal that "doesn't let up until it's done about two minutes later". American Coaster Enthusiasts members praised the ride's speedy maneuvers, smoothness, and ability to be re-rideable. Bobbie Butterfield, a writer for Theme Park Insider, contended that from any seat, "Iron Gwazi is a winner", as well as praising the roller coaster's signature "barrel roll drop" and air time moments.

=== Awards ===
Before its closure, Gwazi was occasionally ranked in Amusement Today's annual Golden Ticket Awards.

Golden Ticket Awards: Top wood Roller Coasters
Year									1998	1999
Ranking									–	–
Year	2000	2001	2002	2003	2004	2005	2006	2007	2008	2009
Ranking	–	–	34 (tie)	44 (tie)	38	43 (tie)	46	40 (tie)	–	–
Year	2010	2011	2012	2013	2014	2015	2016	2017	2018	2019
Ranking	46	–	–	–	–	–	–	–	–	–
Year	2020	2021	2022	2023	2024	2025	2026			
Ranking	N/A	–	–	–	–	–	–			

In its debut year, Iron Gwazi received the Golden Ticket Award for Best New Roller Coaster.

Golden Ticket Awards: Top steel Roller Coasters
Year									1998	1999
Ranking									–	–
Year	2000	2001	2002	2003	2004	2005	2006	2007	2008	2009
Ranking	–	–	–	–	–	–	–	–	–	–
Year	2010	2011	2012	2013	2014	2015	2016	2017	2018	2019
Ranking	–	–	–	–	–	–	–	–	–	–
Year	2020	2021	2022	2023	2024	2025	2026			
Ranking	N/A	–	4	5	5	4	4			

== Incidents ==
In 2006, a 52-year-old Palm Harbor man collapsed after riding Gwazi. He was rushed to a local hospital where he later died. It was determined that the roller coaster, which was functioning properly, had aggravated his high blood pressure.

In 2022, a guest riding Iron Gwazi during its preview hit their hand on a beam, but declined medical treatment after the ride. The incident prompted Busch Gardens to remove two beams where the incident took place.

== See also ==
- List of attractions at Busch Gardens Tampa Bay
- Steel Vengeance, a similar steel-hybrid roller coaster that was refurbished by Rocky Mountain Construction in Ohio
