= Skyline Attractions =

American amusement ride manufacturer

- Type: Private
- Industry: Manufacturing
- Founded: 2014
- Founder: Chris M. Gray; Jeff Pike; Evan Souliere; Bill Wydra
- Headquarters: Orlando, Florida, United States
- Area served: Worldwide
- Key people: Jeff Pike (President); Chris M. Gray (Vice President)
- Products: Amusement rides, roller coasters
- Subsidiaries: Skyline Design
- Website: www.skylineattractions.com

Skyline Attractions, LLC is an American amusement ride and roller coaster design and manufacturing company founded in 2014 and based in Orlando, Florida. The company also includes a subsidiary company, Skyline Design, LLC, which offers design services inside and outside the amusement industry.

The company has manufactured 5 roller coasters in the United States, and has designed multiple roller coasters for other manufacturers as well. Along with manufacturing roller coasters, Skyline Attractions also manufactures flat rides.

== List of roller coasters ==
As of 2023, Skyline Attractions has manufactured 5 roller coasters around the world, none of which are currently in operation, although one is set to open in 2027.

Name	Model	Park	Country	Opened	Status	Details
Harley Quinn Crazy Coaster (•)	Skywarp	Six Flags Discovery Kingdom	United States	2018	Removed	
Tidal Twister (•)	Skywarp Horizon	SeaWorld San Diego	United States	2019	Removed	
Brava!	Custom	Mass MoCA	United States	2022	Removed	
Kid Flash Cosmic Coaster	P'Sghetti Bowl	Six Flags Fiesta Texas	United States	2023	Removed	
Kid Flash Cosmic Coaster	P'Sghetti Bowl	Six Flags Over Georgia	United States	2023	Removed	

(•) = track produced by Rocky Mountain Construction

In addition to manufacturing its own roller coasters, Skyline Design has designed roller coasters for other manufacturers.

Name	Park	Country	Opened	Status	Ref
Mystic Timbers	Kings Island	United States	2017	Operating	
Jungle Dragon	Happy Valley Chongqing	China	2017	Operating	
InvadR	Busch Gardens Williamsburg	United States	2017	Operating	
Great Desert-Rally	Happy Valley Chengdu	China	2017	Operating	
Heidi The Ride	Plopsaland	Belgium	2017	Operating	
Wicker Man	Alton Towers	United Kingdom	2018	Operating	
Wilkołak	Majaland Kownaty	Poland	2019	Operating	
Texas Stingray	SeaWorld San Antonio	United States	2020	Operating	
Roaring Timbers	Sun World Hon Thom Nature Park	Vietnam	2022	Operating	
Zambezi Zinger	Worlds of Fun	United States	2023	Operating	
Hala Madrid	Real Madrid World	United Arab Emirates	2024	Operating	
Colossus	Six Flags Qiddiya City	Saudi Arabia	2025	Operating	
Wild Buffalo	La Mer de Sable	France	2025	Operating	
Mad Racers	Fantasy Valley	China	2026	Under construction	
Unknown	Park Mirakulum	(Czech Republic) Czechia	2027	Under construction	
Wadatsumi	Greenland	Japan	2028	Under construction	

== List of flat rides ==
Outside of roller coasters, Skyline Attractions has also manufactured a variety of flat rides.

Name	Model	Park	Country	Opened	Status	Ref
Crazy Couch	Crazy Couch	Fun Spot Kissimmee	United States	2016	Operating	
Crazy Couch	Crazy Couch	Toy Town Fouad Center Al-Khobar	Saudi Arabia	Unknown	Operating	
Shakin' Bacon	Crazy Couch	Adventureland	United States	2018	Operating	
Party Barn	Crazy Couch	Bengtson's Pumpkin Farm	United States	2018	Operating	
Strike-U-Up; Formerly Stars & Stripes Showdown (Holiday World)	Strike-U-Up	Fantasy Island; Darien Lake; Holiday World & Splashin' Safari; Fun Spot America	United States	2018; 2017; 2015; 2014	In storage	
