= Dolphin Cove =

Dolphin Cove may refer to:

- Dolphin Cove (SeaWorld), a SeaWorld theme park attraction
- Dolphin Cove (TV series), a TV drama created by Peter Benchley, set in Queensland, Australia
- Dolphin Cove Jamaica, a tourist attraction chain in Jamaica
