= Kid Flash Cosmic Coaster =

Roller coasters at various Six Flags parks

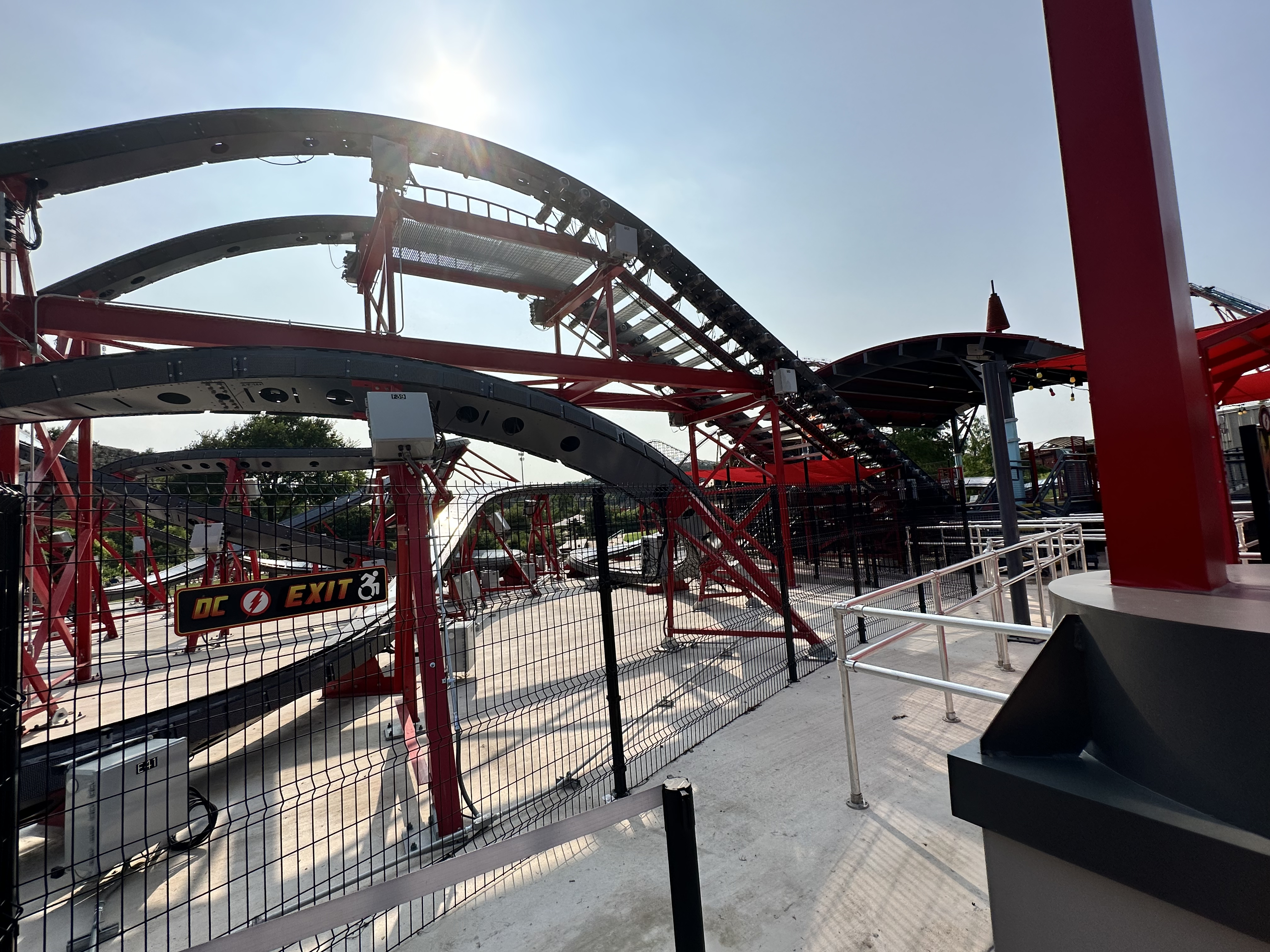

General statistics
- Type: Steel – Dueling – Racing
- Manufacturer: Skyline Attractions
- Model: P'Sghetti Bowl
- Lift/launch system: Booster Wheel Lift Hill
- Height: 24.5 ft (7.5 m)
- Capacity: 1,200 riders per hour
- Height restriction: 36 in (91 cm)
- Trains: 2 trains with 6 cars. Riders are arranged 2 across in a single row for a total of 12 riders per train.
- Length (Track #1): 566.5 feet (172.7 m)
- Length (Track #2): 591.8 feet (180.4 m)

Kid Flash Cosmic Coaster was a single-rail dual-tracked roller coaster based on the DC Comics character Kid Flash at two Six Flags theme parks in the United States.

== History ==
In September 2021, Skyline Attractions unveiled their new P'Sghetti Bowl children's coaster model, which offered a unique track model fabricated solely through the usage of folded sheet metal and rivets, in contrast to the welding techniques frequently used to manufacture coasters.

In November 2022, Six Flags representatives approached Skyline at the IAAPA Expo in Orlando, Florida, where a pair of dueling P'Sghetti Bowl coasters were purchased. The following month, Six Flags Fiesta Texas took it upon themselves to announce at their that they would receive one of the then-unnamed P'Sghetti Bowl coasters, which would become the world’s first "single-rail family racing roller coaster".

In March of 2023, both Six Flags Fiesta Texas and Six Flags Over Georgia formally announced Kid Flash Cosmic Coaster for the 2023 season. The Georgia roller coaster replaced The Joker: Chaos Coaster in the Gotham City section of the park, while the Texas attraction replaced Fender Bender, the park's bumper cars. Both roller coasters are the first dual-racing roller coaster in their respective states.

On March 5th, 2025, it was revealed through an email to Six Flags that both installations of the ride were closed permanently. Both rides reportedly regularly experienced technical problems and downtime throughout their operational lives.

On July 9th, 2026, CJ Barrymore's, a family entertainment center located in Clinton Township, Michigan, announced that it bought one of the two defunct P'Sghetti Bowl coasters.

== Ride ==
The roller coaster ran two trains on two dual tracks zig zagging each other a total of twelve (12) times. Designed by Skyline Attractions, both roller coasters reach a height of 24.5 feet (7.5 m) and a track length in total of 1,158 feet (353 m).

Both Kid Flash Cosmic Coasters featured LED lighting along the entire length of the top and sides of the track.

== Installations ==
Locations for Kid Flash Cosmic Coaster
Park	Area	Opening date	Closing Date	Refs
Six Flags Fiesta Texas	DC Universe	November 4, 2023	2024	
Six Flags Over Georgia	Gotham City	November 5, 2023	2024	
