= Barracuda Strike =

Roller coaster at SeaWorld San Antonio

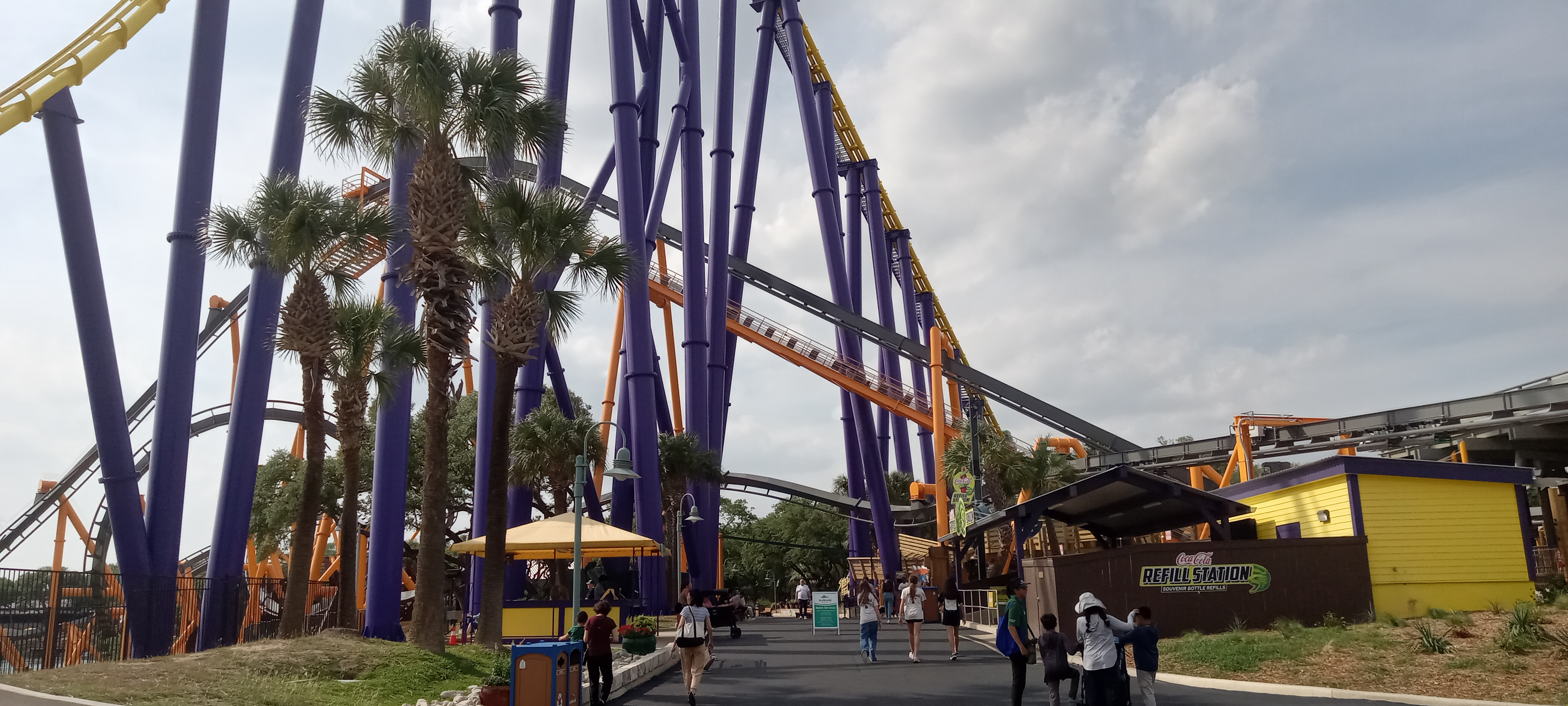

SeaWorld San Antonio
- Location: SeaWorld San Antonio
- Coordinates: 29.4549°N 98.6964°W
- Status: Operating
- Opening date: March 7, 2026
- Cost: $8.97 million

General statistics
- Type: Steel
- Manufacturer: Bolliger & Mabillard
- Model: Family Inverted Coaster
- Lift/launch system: Chain lift hill
- Height: 90 ft (27 m)
- Length: 1,800 ft (550 m)
- Speed: 44 mph (71 km/h)
- Inversions: 0
- Height restriction: 42 in (107 cm)
- Barracuda Strike at RCDB

Barracuda Strike is an inverted roller coaster located at SeaWorld San Antonio in San Antonio. Manufactured by Bolliger & Mabillard, the ride stands 90 feet (27 m) tall and was advertised as the tallest inverted family coaster in North America. It opened to the public on March 7, 2026. The inverted coaster reaches a maximum speed of 44 mph (71 km/h) and features a track length of 1,800 feet (550 m).
