= Texas Stingray =

Roller coaster at SeaWorld San Antonio

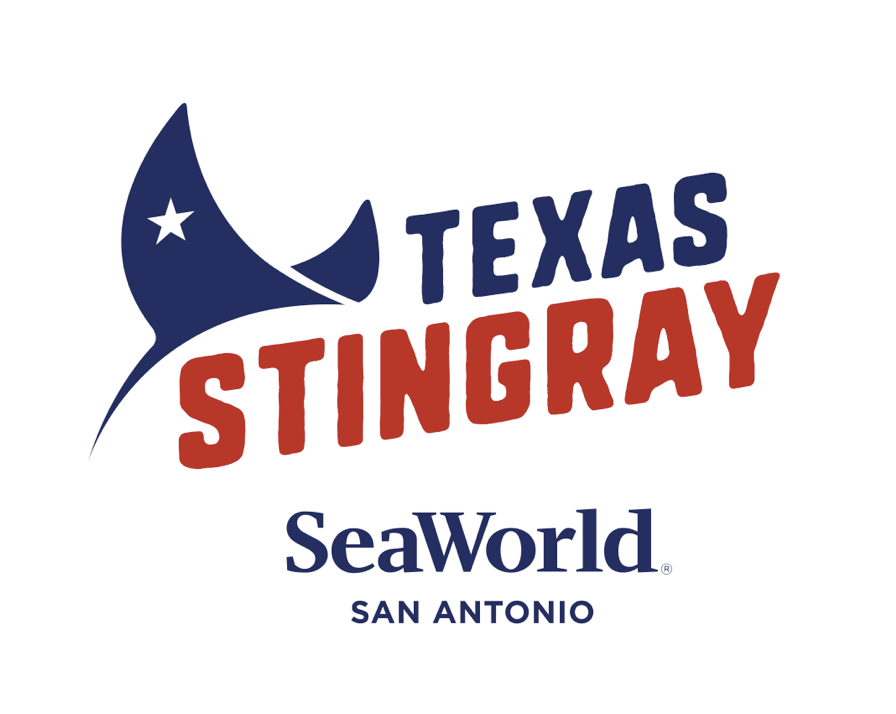

SeaWorld San Antonio
- Location: SeaWorld San Antonio
- Coordinates: 29.4524°N 98.6990°W
- Status: Operating
- Soft opening date: February 21, 2020
- Opening date: February 22, 2020

General statistics
- Type: Wood
- Manufacturer: Great Coasters International
- Designer: Dustin Sloane, Skyline Attractions
- Track layout: Twister
- Lift/launch system: Chain lift hill
- Height: 96 ft (29 m)
- Drop: 100 ft (30 m)
- Length: 3,379 ft (1,030 m)
- Speed: 55 mph (89 km/h)
- Inversions: 0
- Height restriction: 46 in (117 cm)
- Texas Stingray at RCDB

Texas Stingray is a wooden roller coaster at SeaWorld San Antonio in San Antonio, Texas, manufactured by Great Coasters International (GCI) and designed by Skyline Attractions. The coaster opened in February 2020 and operated for just a few weeks before the park closed due to the COVID-19 pandemic. The coaster reopened when the park resumed limited operation on June 11, 2020.

== History ==
Planning for Texas Stingray dates to 2017. In April 2019, it was reported that a trademark was filed for a new theme park ride at SeaWorld San Antonio under the name “Abyss.” At around the same time land clearing and construction began at the park on a site across the pathway from the nearly finished attractions for 2019, Turtle Reef, Riptide Rescue, and Sea Swinger. Texas Stingray was not formally announced until September 12, 2019, at which time it was revealed that the coaster would be the "tallest, fastest, [and] longest" wooden coaster in Texas. The trains were on display in November at the GCI booth at the IAAPA expo, during which it was announced that the coaster was scheduled to open spring 2020. Texas Stingray operated for the media on February 21, 2020, season pass holders on February 22, then opened to the public a week later on February 29, 2020.

== Ride experience ==
Texas Stingray was primarily designed by Dustin Sloane, Skyline Attractions' director of creative process, with President Jeff Pike overseeing the process. As with recent SeaWorld installations, the attraction endeavors to educate while entertaining and to promote the park's core message of conservation and preservation. SeaWorld partnered with the Harte Research Institute for Gulf of Mexico Studies (HRI) to create signage in and around the attraction and throughout the queue. The signage provides details on stingrays found in the Texas Gulf and how everyone is connected to the ocean. In addition, 5% of the sales of Texas Stingray merchandise is donated to HRI.

As the train leaves the station it curves to the right to engage the 96-foot lift hill, another right turn off the lift leads to an atypical straight first drop of 100 feet into a small valley. A straight uphill climb leads to a curving dive to the right as the coaster assumes a more typical GCI layout. According to the designers, the soaring curves mimic the action of a large ray swimming in the ocean. Multiple curves and dips are combined with airtime pops. As the train works its way over to the Rio Loco rapids ride it passes over a section of the channel before heading back toward the station. On the return run, the coaster slices through the support structure of the lift hill then dives into a surprise curved tunnel. Following a few more turns and airtime hills the train returns to the station. The ride time from station release to brake varies but is approximately 1:40–1:50.

== Characteristics ==
The coaster occupies a previously undeveloped plot of land between the Shamu Theater and the park's Rio Loco river rapids ride. The wooden-tracked ride features steel supports, which had been utilized on two previous GCI coasters, including InvadR at sister-park Busch Gardens Williamsburg. The terrain includes small valleys and undulations which the design takes advantage of. A 96-foot lift hill leads into a drop of 100 feet (30 m). The coaster reaches a top speed of 55 miles per hour (89 km/h) while traversing 3,379 feet (1,030 m) of track. The wooden track features extensive use of ipe wood which is stronger, denser and more durable than typical coaster track.

== Reception ==
=== Awards ===
Golden Ticket Awards: Top wood Roller Coasters
Year									1998	1999
Ranking									–	–
Year	2000	2001	2002	2003	2004	2005	2006	2007	2008	2009
Ranking	–	–	–	–	–	–	–	–	–	–
Year	2010	2011	2012	2013	2014	2015	2016	2017	2018	2019
Ranking	–	–	–	–	–	–	–	–	–	–
Year	2020	2021	2022	2023	2024	2025	2026			
Ranking	N/A	45 (tie)	27	33	26	34 (tie)	26 (tie)			
