= InvadR =

Wooden roller coaster in Virginia

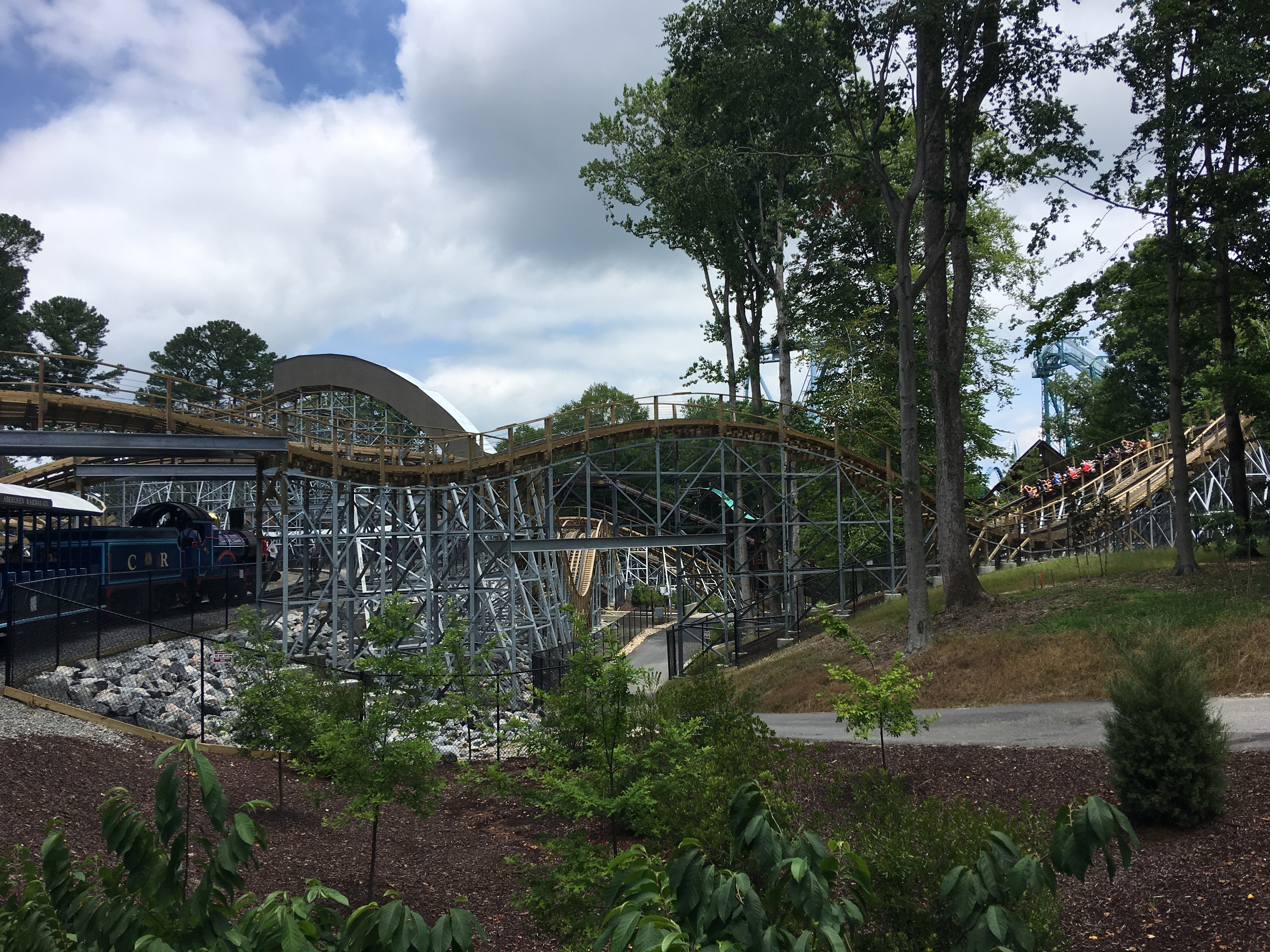

Busch Gardens Williamsburg
- Location: Busch Gardens Williamsburg
- Park section: New France
- Coordinates: 37°13′57″N 76°38′55″W
- Status: Operating
- Opening date: April 7, 2017

General statistics
- Type: Wood
- Manufacturer: Great Coasters International
- Designer: Jeff Pike; Skyline Design, LLC
- Lift/launch system: Chain lift hill
- Height: 60 ft (18 m)
- Drop: 74 ft (23 m)
- Length: 2,118 ft (646 m)
- Speed: 48 mph (77 km/h)
- Inversions: 0
- Height restriction: 46 in (117 cm)
- Trains: 2 trains with 8 cars. Riders are arranged 2 across in a single row for a total of 16 riders per train.
- Restraints: Lap Bar
- Quick Queue available
- InvadR at RCDB

Video

InvadR is a wooden roller coaster at Busch Gardens Williamsburg amusement park in James City County, Virginia, United States. The coaster was designed by American designer Skyline Attractions and built by American manufacturer Great Coasters International, and opened on April 7, 2017. The ride features a 74-foot (23 m) drop, a maximum speed of 48 miles per hour (77 km/h), and a total track length of 2,118 feet (646 m).

== History ==
After a three-month web-campaign on March 19, 2016, Busch Gardens Williamsburg announced that a new wooden roller coaster would be introduced in 2017. The park let fans vote among three names – Viking Raider, InvadR, and Battle Klash – until April 1, 2016. InvadR was ultimately chosen by the Internet poll. On May 30, 2016, it was confirmed that trains from Gwazi, a defunct roller coaster at Busch Gardens Tampa, would be repurposed for InvadR. The attraction opened to the general public on April 7, 2017.

== Ride experience ==
After leaving the station, the train makes two right turns and climbs the 60-foot (18 m) chain lift hill. Upon reaching the top, it makes a left turn, goes through a tunnel and drops 74 feet (23 m) at 48 miles per hour (77 km/h). The train makes a sharp right turn and ascends several airtime hills, before making a right and then left turn into a helix. Afterwards, the train enters the final brake run and returns to the station.

== Awards ==
Golden Ticket Awards: Best New Ride for 2017
Ranking	4

Golden Ticket Awards: Top wood Roller Coasters
Year									1998	1999
Ranking									–	–
Year	2000	2001	2002	2003	2004	2005	2006	2007	2008	2009
Ranking	–	–	–	–	–	–	–	–	–	–
Year	2010	2011	2012	2013	2014	2015	2016	2017	2018	2019
Ranking	–	–	–	–	–	–	–	–	–	41
Year	2020	2021	2022	2023	2024	2025				
Ranking	N/A	48	45	45	–	–				
