= Dolphin Cove (SeaWorld attraction) =

Attraction at SeaWorld parks

Coordinates: 29.4598°N 98.7000°W

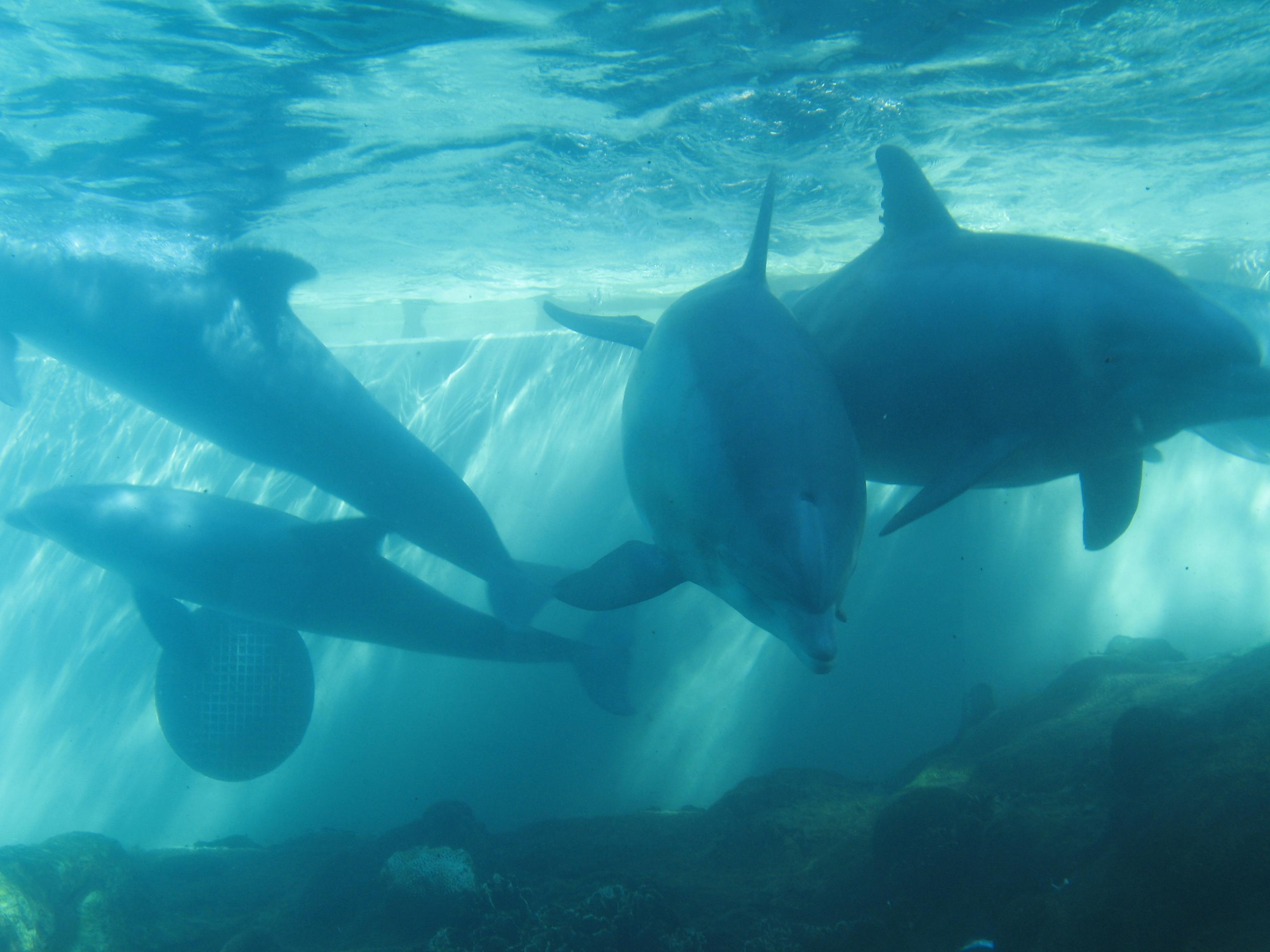
- The underwater viewing area with bottlenose dolphins at SeaWorld Orlando

SeaWorld San Diego
- Status: Operating
- Opening date: 1964

SeaWorld Orlando
- Status: Operating
- Opening date: 1973

SeaWorld San Antonio
- Status: Removed
- Opening date: 1988
- Closing date: 2015
- Replaced by: Discovery Point

SeaWorld Ohio
- Status: Removed
- Opening date: 1970
- Closing date: January 2001

Ride statistics
- Attraction type: Dolphin exhibit
- Designer: SeaWorld

Dolphin Cove or Dolphin Point is a dolphin exhibit attraction found at SeaWorld parks, including SeaWorld San Diego and SeaWorld Orlando, and formerly at SeaWorld San Antonio and SeaWorld Ohio. The habitats at SeaWorld San Diego and SeaWorld Orlando hold about 700,000 US gallons (2,650,000 L) of water and are some of the largest dolphin pools in existence.

== History ==
When founded in 1964, SeaWorld San Diego was the first of its kind to feature a Dolphin Cove. In 1970, the second SeaWorld park, SeaWorld Ohio, opened in Aurora, Ohio and featured a Dolphin Cove as well. In January 2001, SeaWorld Ohio was sold to Six Flags, resulting in the exhibit's closure, as Six Flags was uninterested in maintaining the marine life exhibits.

In 1973, the third Dolphin Cove opened as a debut year attraction at SeaWorld Orlando. In 1988, the fourth Dolphin Cove at SeaWorld San Antonio opened its doors, also during the park's debut year. SeaWorld San Diego's Dolphin Cove was eventually renamed Dolphin Point.

On March 6, 2015, SeaWorld San Antonio announced that the park would introduce a new habitat called Discovery Point for three of its animal interaction programs with dolphins, beluga whales, and California sea lions. The announcement of the project was followed by Dolphin Cove's closure on March 23, 2015. Discovery Point officially opened to the public on May 21, 2016. The project doubled the size of the previous dolphin pool and added an underwater viewing area.

== Exhibit ==
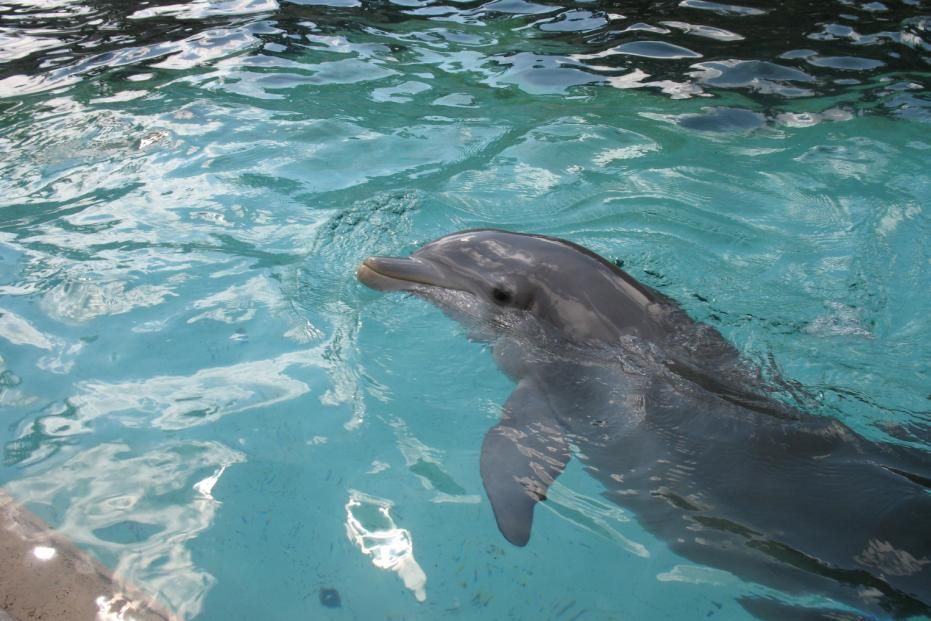
A bottlenose dolphin surfacing in a pool

The habitat is designed to reflect a natural ecosystem and has an underwater viewing area where visitors can watch dolphins while listening to music and the dolphins' communications. It features 2-foot-high (0.61 m) waves, a sandy beach, and an imitation coral reef.

Dolphin Cove's population mainly consists of bottlenose dolphins, one of the most common dolphin species. At SeaWorld Orlando, the dolphins are rotated between the exhibit, Dolphin Nursery and Discovery Cove; depending on pregnancies and space availability.

Throughout the day, visitors can feed the dolphins for a fee. Trainers are present to give informational speeches about the bottlenose dolphin.
