= SeaWorld San Antonio =

Theme park in San Antonio, Texas

- Previously known as Sea World of Texas

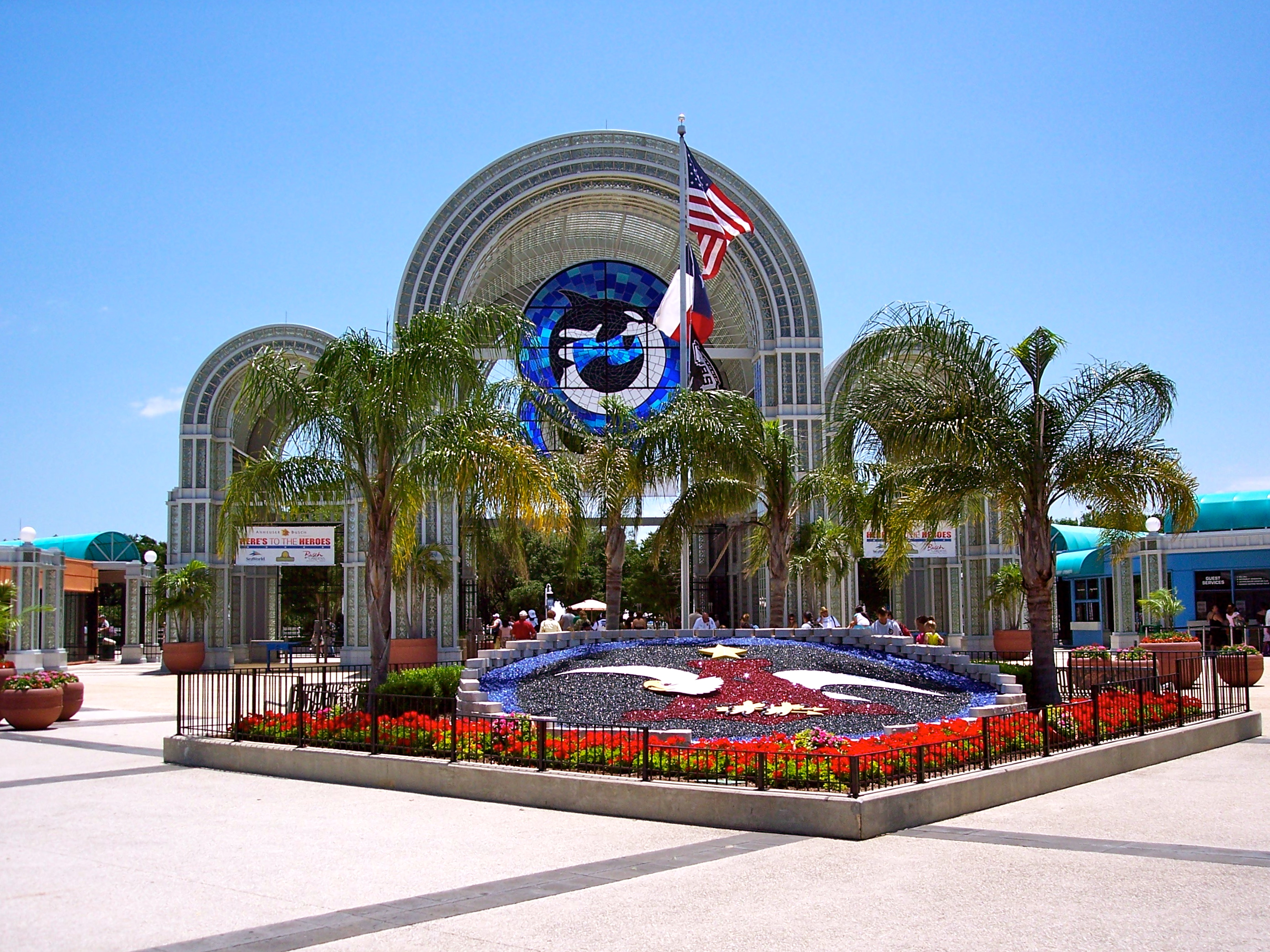
- Interactive map of SeaWorld San Antonio
- Location: 10500 Sea World Drive; San Antonio, Bexar County, Texas United States
- Coordinates: 29.4584°N 98.6998°W
- Opened: May 27, 1988; 38 years ago
- Owner: United Parks & Resorts
- Operated by: United Parks & Resorts
- General manager: Jeff Davis
- Slogan: "From Park to Planet" (See It Here, Save It There)
- Operating season: Year-round
- Area: 416 acres (168 ha)

Attractions
- Total: 15
- Roller coasters: 6
- Water rides: 3
- Website: seaworld.com/san-antonio/

SeaWorld San Antonio is a 416-acre (168 ha) marine mammal park, oceanarium and animal theme park in the Westover Hills District of San Antonio, Texas, on the city's west side. It is the largest of the three parks in the SeaWorld chain owned and operated by United Parks & Resorts. As North America's largest marine-life theme park, and one of the world's largest marine-life theme parks, it is focused on conservation, education and animal rescue. It is a member of the Alliance of Marine Mammal Parks and Aquariums (AMMPA) and is accredited by the Association of Zoos and Aquariums (AZA).

== History ==
The park, initially called Sea World of Texas, was developed by Harcourt, Brace and Jovanovich (now Houghton Mifflin Harcourt). Built for $170 million, it opened on May 27, 1988, and 75,000 people attended the opening. It had 3.3 million visitors in its first 12 months of operation, placing it among the Top 10 attractions in Texas. At the time of its debut, it was billed as "the largest educational, marine-life theme park in the world."

On November 26, 1988, Kayla (stage named "Baby Shamu") was the first orca born at the park. At the time of her death on January 28, 2019, she resided at SeaWorld Orlando.

In 1989, Harcourt, Brace and Jovanovich (heavy in debt and fighting a hostile takeover) sold its SeaWorld and Boardwalk and Baseball theme parks to Anheuser-Busch, Inc. Plans to build a second Boardwalk and Baseball park adjacent to Sea World San Antonio were abandoned.

Under Anheuser-Busch ownership, the park closed less popular attractions consisting of the Texas Walk, Cypress Gardens West, Joplin Square, U.S. Map Plaza, and the Garden of Flags and added its Budweiser Clydesdales to the park.

In 2008, Anheuser-Busch merged with InBev; soon after, in 2009, the newly merged company sold the SeaWorld parks to the Blackstone Group. In 2017, Blackstone sold its stake to China's Zhonghong Group.

In March 2016, SeaWorld Entertainment announced that the current generation of orcas at it parks would be the last. SeaWorld San Antonio currently houses 4 orcas. It was also announced that the theatrical orca shows would be phased out and replaced with more naturalistic Orca Encounters. SeaWorld San Antonio's Orca Encounter opened on February 22, 2020.

In 2024, Catapult Falls, the world's first launched flume ride, opened to the public. In the fall of 2024, SeaWorld San Antonio announced that they would retheme their Sesame Street Bay of Play area to SeaWorld Rescue Jr., a similar concept to the one at SeaWorld San Diego. On March 8th, 2025, SeaWorld Rescue Jr. area opened to guests, with new and rethemed rides such as Beach Rescue Racers, Ocean Quest Express, Tide Pool Tumble, Seabird Swing, and Ocean Rescue Carousel.

On March 7, 2026, the park opened Barracuda Strike, a new inverted family coaster.

== Attractions ==
=== Roller coasters and rides ===
#	Name	Opened	Description
1	Beach Rescue Racer	2025	This is a 1,300 ft long roller coaster with cars in the shape of a beach jeep, designed to give guests the feeling of rushing to rescue animals in need.
2	Ocean Quest Express	2025	Train ride that allows children play the game "I Spy"
3	Seabird Swing	2025	SeaWorld Rescue Jr themed Wave Swinger.
4	Catapult Falls	2024	This Intamin flume ride is the world's first launched flume coaster.
5	Texas Stingray	2020	This GCI coaster is the tallest, longest, and fastest wooden roller coaster in Texas.
6	Wave Breaker: The Rescue Coaster	2017	An Intamin double-launch coaster, based on the theme of SeaWorld's animal-rescue team.
7	The Great White	1997	The park's first coaster, a Bolliger & Mabillard inverted roller coaster, which debuted in 1997. It reaches a top speed of 50 mph (80 km/h). It is the first roller coaster of its kind in Texas. Lift height is 108.2 ft. The total track length is 2,562 ft.
8	Steel Eel	1999	This steel, non-looping Chance Morgan coaster is 150 ft (45.7 m) tall, 3,700 ft (1,127.8 m) long, w/ a top speed of 65 mph (104.6 km/h) and a capacity of 1200 riders per hour.
9	Journey to Atlantis	2007	The first ride of its kind in North America, Atlantis debuted in 2007. It is a Mack Rides hybrid of roller coaster and Shoot the chute.
10	Barracuda Strike	2026	A Bolliger & Mabillard inverted family roller coaster, billed as the tallest in North America.
11	Tidal Surge	2022	World's largest S&S Screamin' Swing
12	Riptide Rescue	2019	A three-armed Huss Airboat spinning flat ride themed to animal rescue.
13	Sea Swinger	2019	A Zamperla Midi Discovery spinning-pendulum flat ride.
14	Ocean Rescue Carousel (Formerly Grover's Round-Up)	2011 (2025)	A carousel themed to SeaWorld Rescue.
15	Tide Pool Tumble (Formerly Abby Cadabby's Rockin’ Wave)	2011 (2025)	A Zamperla Rockin' Tug themed to coastal sea creatures.
16	Big Bird's Spinning Reef (formerly Pete's Spinwheel)	1992 (2011)	A mini Ferris wheel themed to coral reefs and Big Bird from Sesame Street.
17	Elmo's Dolphin Dive (formerly Jump’n Jungle)	1992 (2011)	A kiddie drop tower ride themed to dolphins and Elmo from Sesame Street.
18	Rio Loco	1993	A river rapids ride.

=== Live entertainment and animal presentations ===
#	Name	Opened	Description
15	Orca Stadium (formerly Shamu Theater)	2020 (1988)	The 7,000,000 US gallons (26,000,000 L) home to the park's four orcas originally opened in 1988. The venue's current production is Orca Encounter since late February 2020. The venue housed theatrical orca shows until December 2019, including the former show One Ocean and the summer seasonal Shamu's Celebration: Light Up The Night and winter seasonal Shamu Christmas Miracles night shows. An educational show called Orcas: Up Close was also presented on select times.
16	Beluga Stadium	1988	The home to the park's beluga whales and Pacific white-sided dolphins with house shows with the whales and dolphins and formerly macaws and live acrobats called by the names of Viva and Azul until 2016 when they were replaced by an educational show named Ocean Discovery: Dolphins and Beluga Whales.
17	Sea Lion Stadium	1988	Hosts "Clyde and Seamore," a pair of California sea lions in the presentation Sea Lion & Otter Spotlight. Asian small-clawed otters also partake in the show.
18	Bayside Stadium	1988	Hosts water skiing stunt shows on the park's central lagoon as well as the preferential viewing area for the park's seasonal fireworks shows.
19	Nautilus Amphitheater	1988	An open-air theater used for different purposes and park shows including seasonal animal presentations and the main musical show for the park's premier Howl-O-Scream event Monster Stomp on Ripper Row. The theater also hosts stage musical O Wondrous Night during the park's Christmas Celebration event.
20	Sea Star Theatre	2003	Originally constructed as a 4-D theater that formerly showed R.L. Stine's Haunted Lighthouse and Pirates 4D. The building was reconfigured as a conventional theater in 2013 and housed Pets Ahoy, a show which featured animals that have been rescued from local animal shelters. The show was cut in 2020 due to budget cuts affiliated with the loss of revenue due to COVID-19. The theater hosted the park's Sesame Street shows after reopening following the COVID-19 pandemic. In 2023, the theater debuted John Tartaglia's ImaginOcean, a glow-in-the-dark musical puppet show about fish.

=== Former attractions ===
Name	Opened	Closed	Description
Dolphin Cove	1988	2015	Dolphin habitat exhibit that featured an underwater viewing experience for guests. Replaced by Discovery Point.
Super Grover's Box Car Derby	2004	2024	A family roller coaster from Zierer that originally opened as Shamu Express with Shamu-themed trains. It was rethemed to Sesame Street in 2019.

== Animal inventory ==
=== Orcas ===
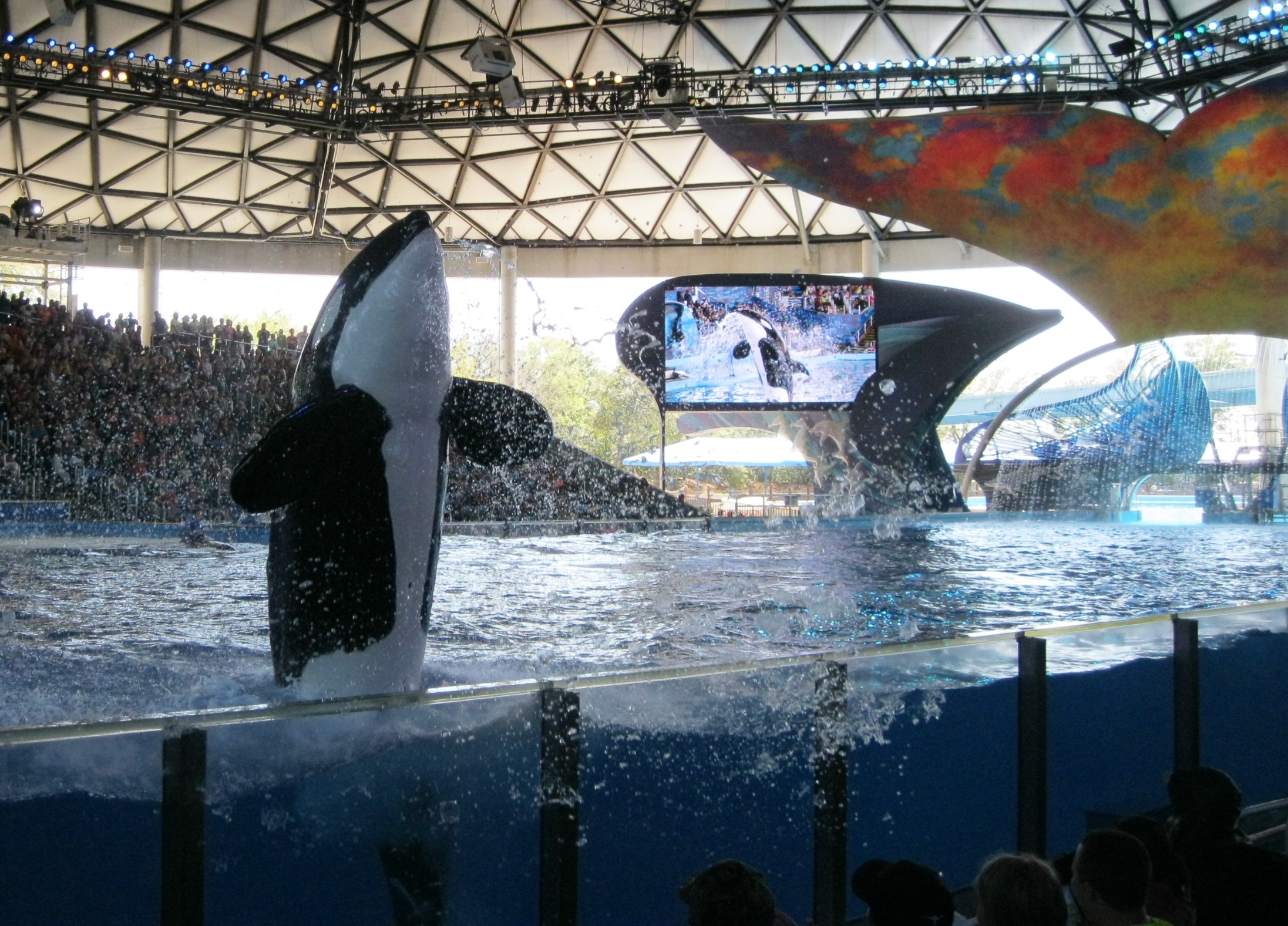
One Ocean (The Shamu show)

SeaWorld's orcas are housed in Shamu Theater, a geodesic dome, most of whom were born at SeaWorld except Kyuquot who was born at the defunct Sealand of the Pacific in Canada. There are currently 4 orcas, Takara (F; matriarch), Sakari (F), Tuar (M) and Kyuquot (M).

=== Beluga whales ===
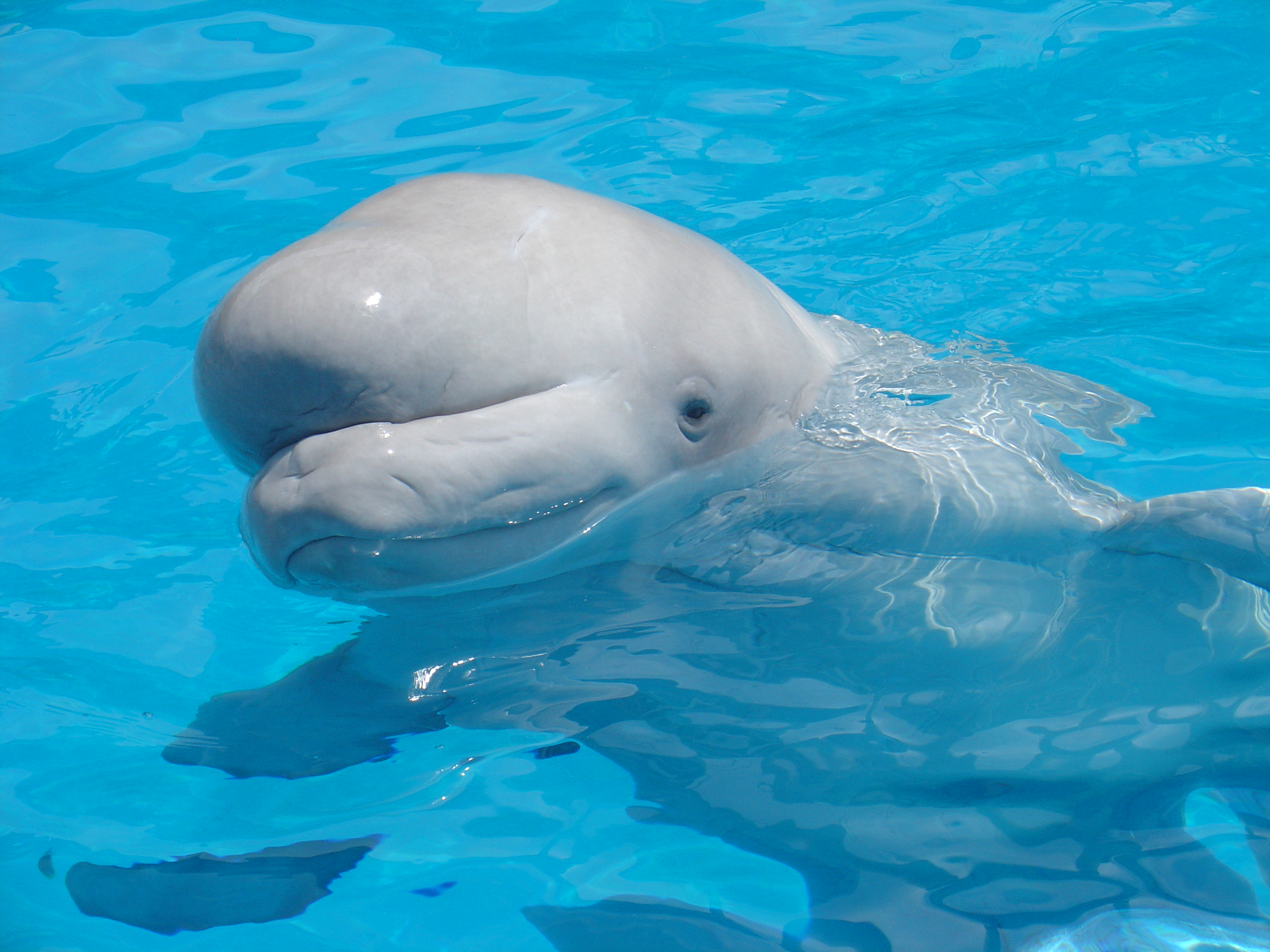
Beluga whale.

SeaWorld San Antonio maintains a population of beluga whales at Beluga Bay. The park has operated a beluga breeding program and has also received rescued and transferred whales from other facilities.

The park is the permanent home of Tyonek, a male Cook Inlet beluga that stranded in Alaska as a calf in 2017 and was deemed non-releasable because of his young age and lack of survival skills. He was placed at San Antonio because of the park's population of experienced adult belugas and younger animals. Tyonek subsequently developed a social bond with Betty, one of the park's Pacific white-sided dolphins.

In 2026, SeaWorld San Antonio became one of several U.S. aquariums participating in the relocation of the remaining belugas from the closed Marineland of Canada in Niagara Falls, Ontario. The first two, male belugas Bertie Botts and Frankie, arrived on July 21 after travelling more than 1,500 miles by truck and aircraft. They were initially housed separately while acclimating before being gradually introduced to the park's existing beluga population.

Seven female Marineland belugas—Xena, Gemini, Skyla, Meeka, Eve, Neva and Calypso—arrived on August 4. The transfer was the largest single movement of belugas completed during the relocation effort up to that point.

The final four Marineland belugas assigned to SeaWorld San Antonio—Tank, Odin, Orion and Tofino—left Canada on August 31 and arrived safely in San Antonio on September 1, 2026. They were part of the final six belugas removed from Marineland, whose departure ended the keeping of captive whales in Canada. In total, SeaWorld San Antonio received thirteen belugas from Marineland during the 2026 relocation.

=== Dolphins ===
SeaWorld has 16 bottlenose dolphins that live in two different areas of the park. Discovery Point is where most of the park's dolphins live (11 of them), where they do interaction programs and are also on display via above water and underwater viewing areas. Zoological Support is a backstage area where five other dolphins live and where other animals could go for breeding purposes, specialized veterinary care, etc. Zoological Support is also the main rescue hub of the park and currently houses three rescued bottlenose dolphins. While most dolphins were born within the SeaWorld parks except Notchfin, 3 of these dolphins are also rescued dolphins that were deemed nonreleasable by the National Marine Fisheries Service.

The park also has seven Pacific white-sided dolphins that live at Beluga Stadium. SeaWorld San Antonio is one of two zoological facilities in the United States that cares for Pacific white-sided dolphins.

=== Sea Lions, Seals, and Otters ===
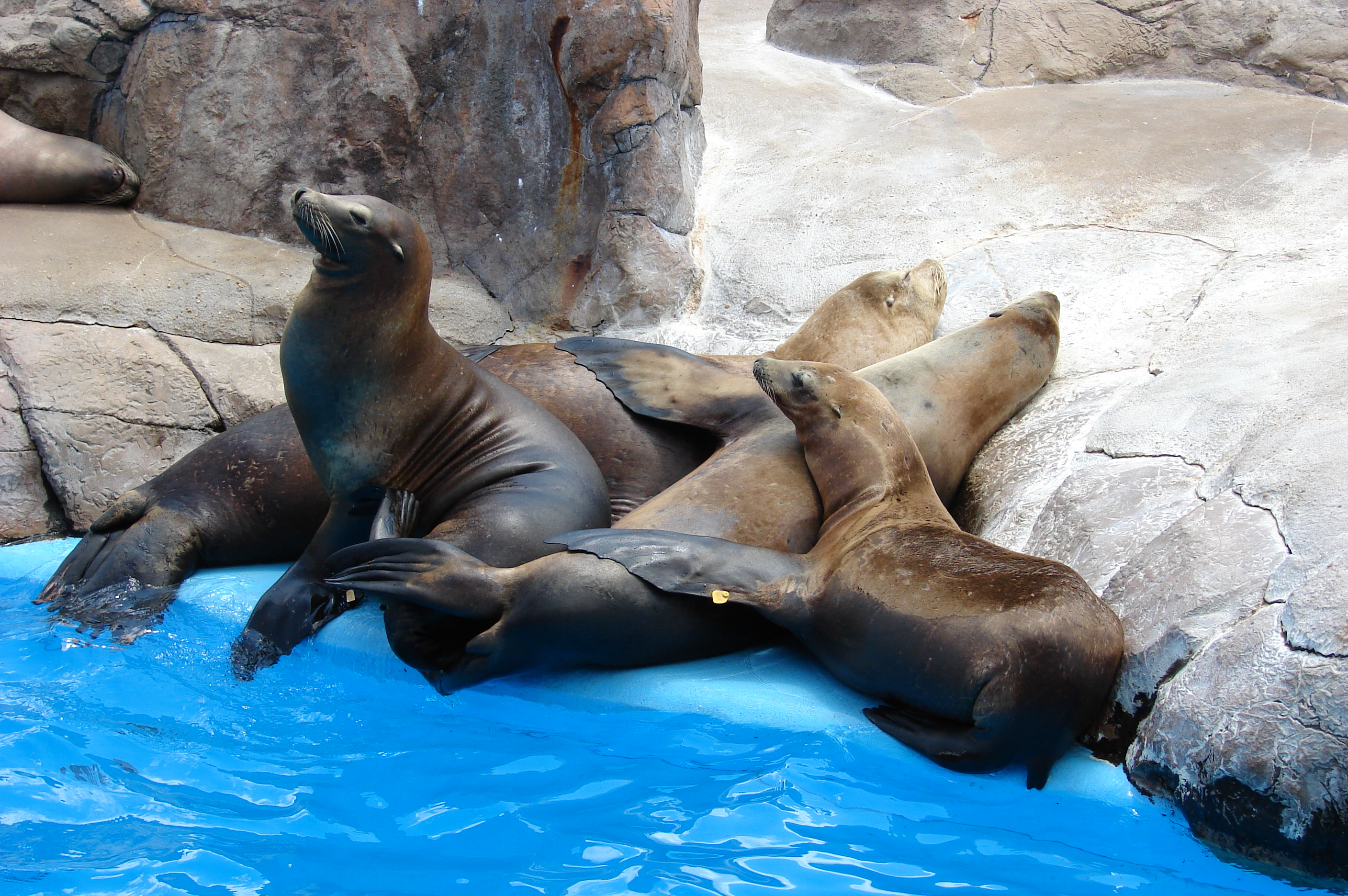
Basking sea lions.

In addition to the performing sea lions and otters, there is a large population of California sea lions and harbor seals living at this open air exhibit. Pinniped feeding opportunities are available for an additional fee. Unique to this SeaWorld is an exhibit for the park's Asian small-clawed and African spot-necked otters, while the other parks' freshwater otters can only be seen during shows.

=== Sea Turtles ===
The newest animal exhibit in the park which opened in May 2019 featuring rescued loggerhead and green sea turtles that live with schools of marine fish. It also has a natural biofiltration system consisting of an adjacent salt marsh with bacteria in the plant roots that feed on animal waste.

Penguins

SeaWorld San Antonio has about 250 penguins in their collection, and there are four total species, the king penguin, gentoo, chinstrap and the southern rockhopper. The penguin exhibit is a recreation of the Falkland Islands as all of the species cared for in the exhibit are found above Antarctica.

== Aquatica San Antonio ==
Aquatica is a water park that was formerly a section of the park under the name, Lost Lagoon, which opened in 1993 and closed on September 5, 2011, to be replaced by Aquatica San Antonio, a separate gated water park based on the original Aquatica Orlando. Known as "Texas' Best Waterpark", the new park opened on Memorial Day weekend May 2012.

== Attendance ==
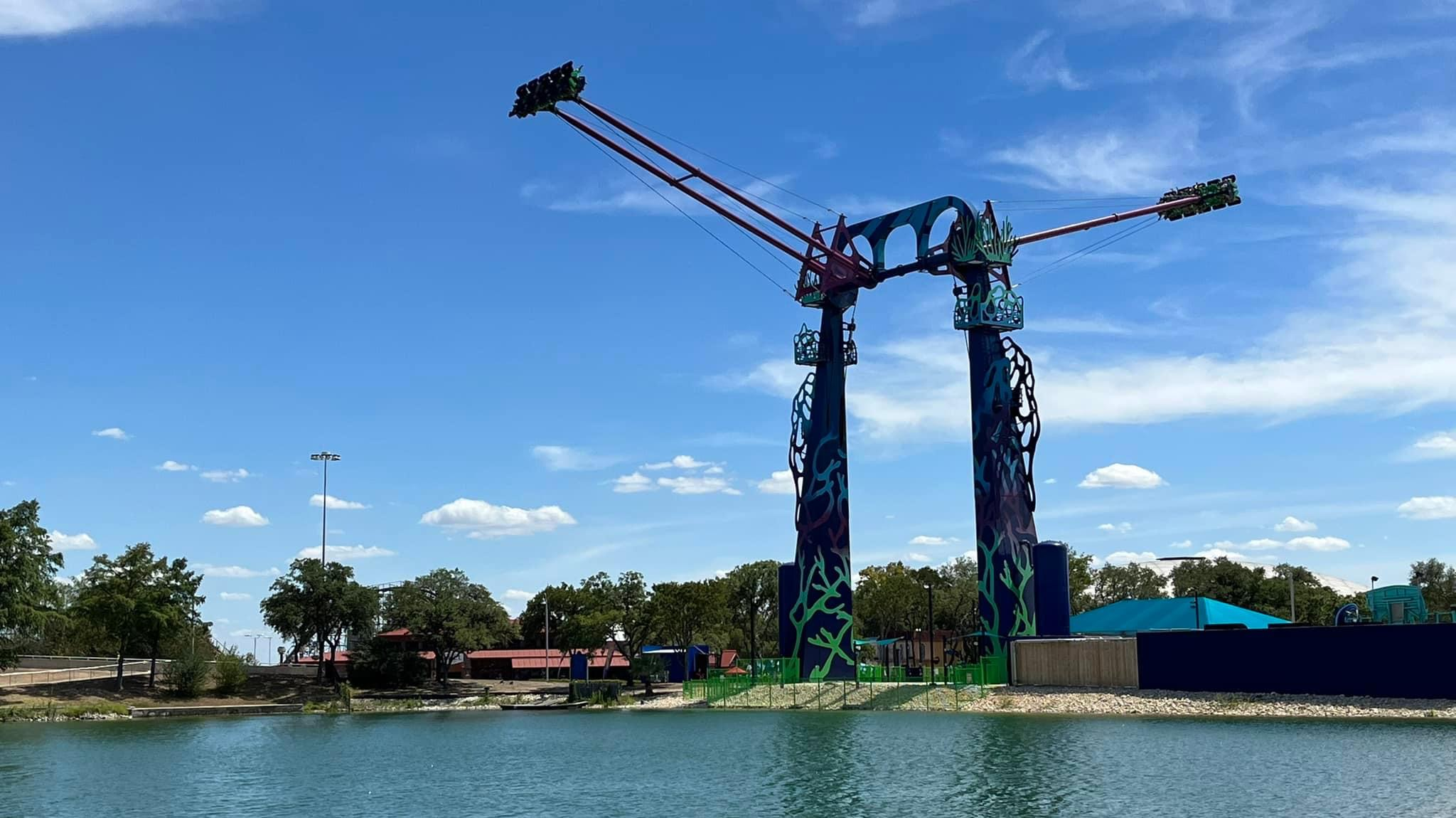
Tidal Surge

2009	2,600,000
2011	2,600,000
2012	2,678,000
2013	Not listed
2014	Not listed
2015	Not listed

== Gallery ==
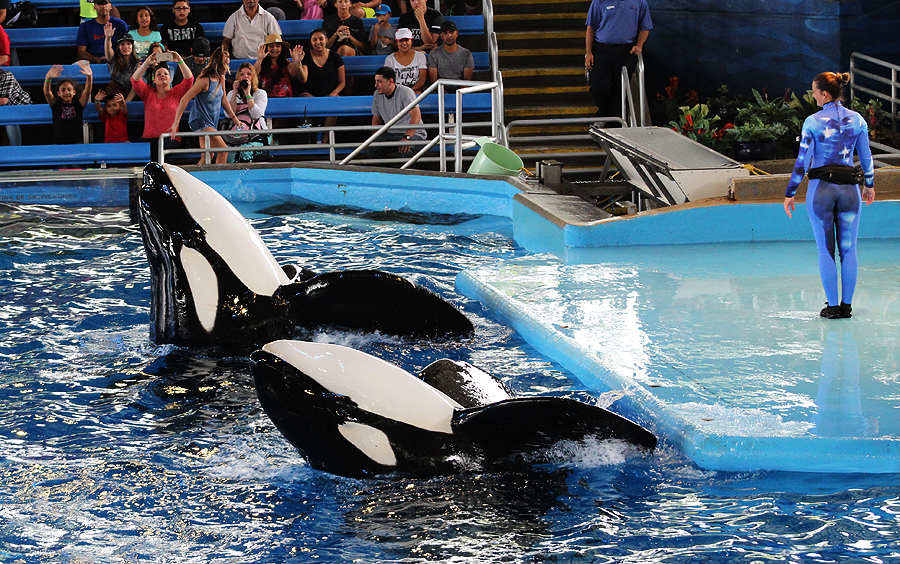
Kyuquot (back) and Tuar (front) perform at Shamu Theater during "One Ocean"

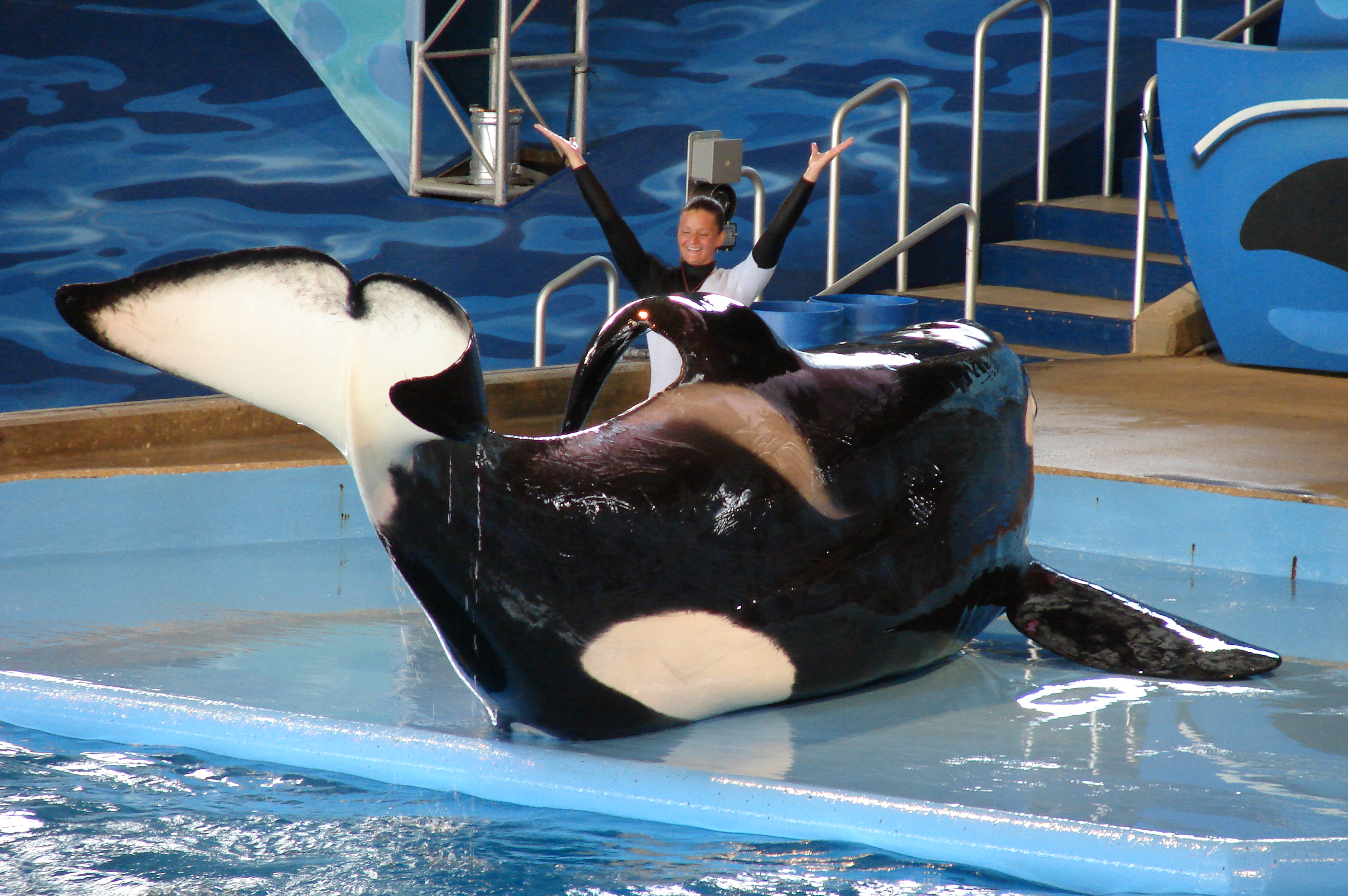
An orca named Kyuquot

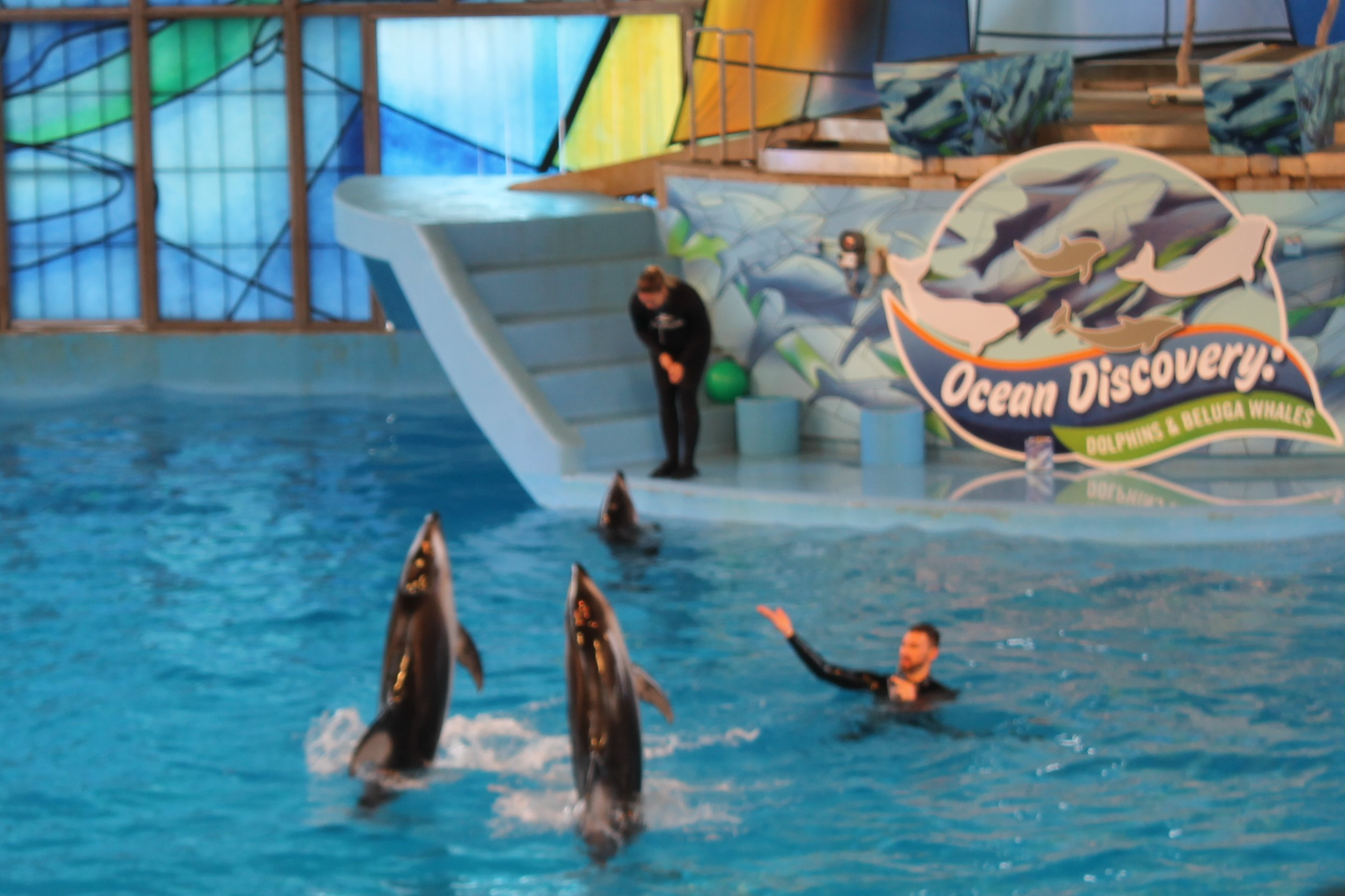
Ocean Discovery

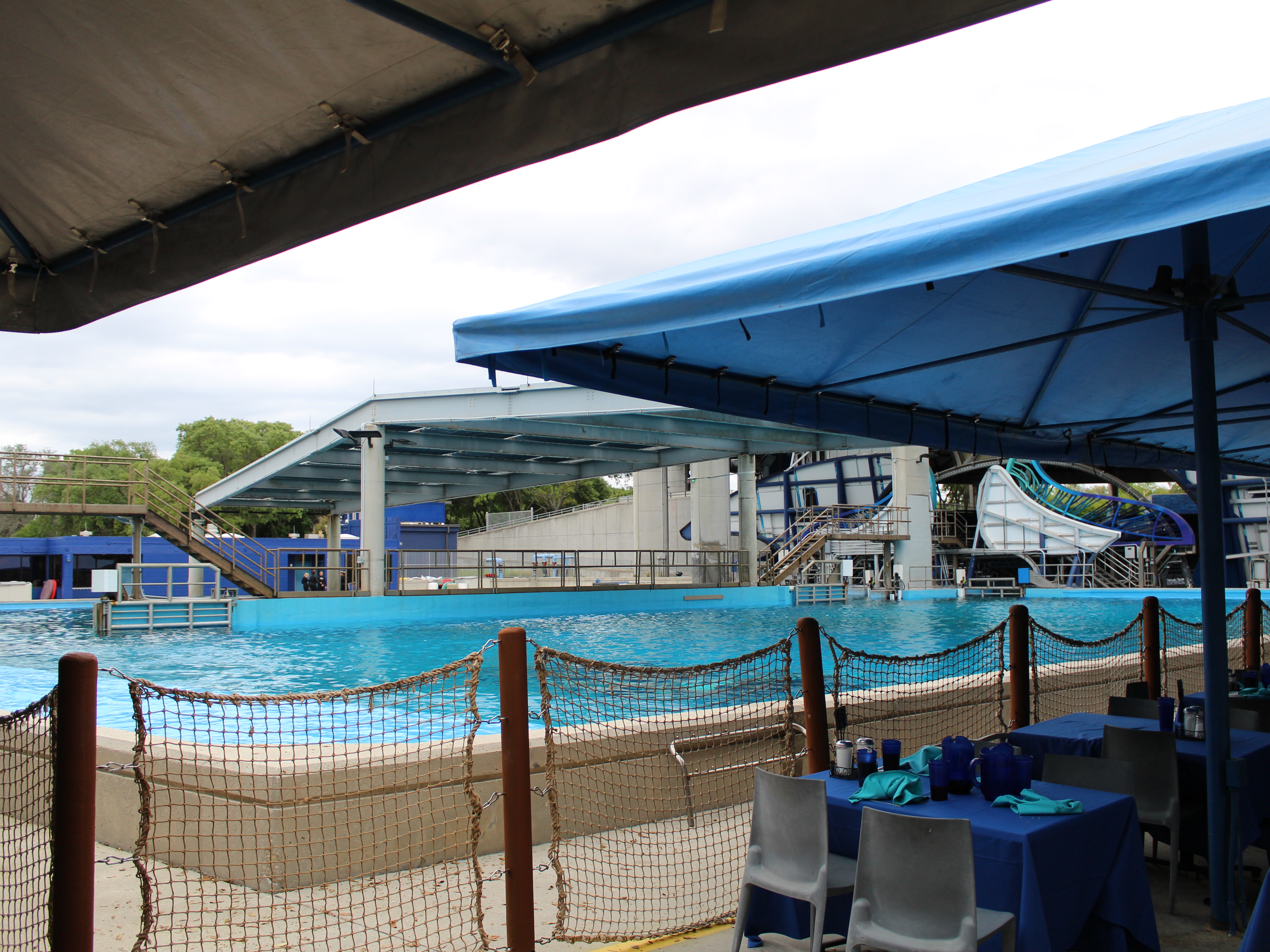
Dine with Shamu dining area

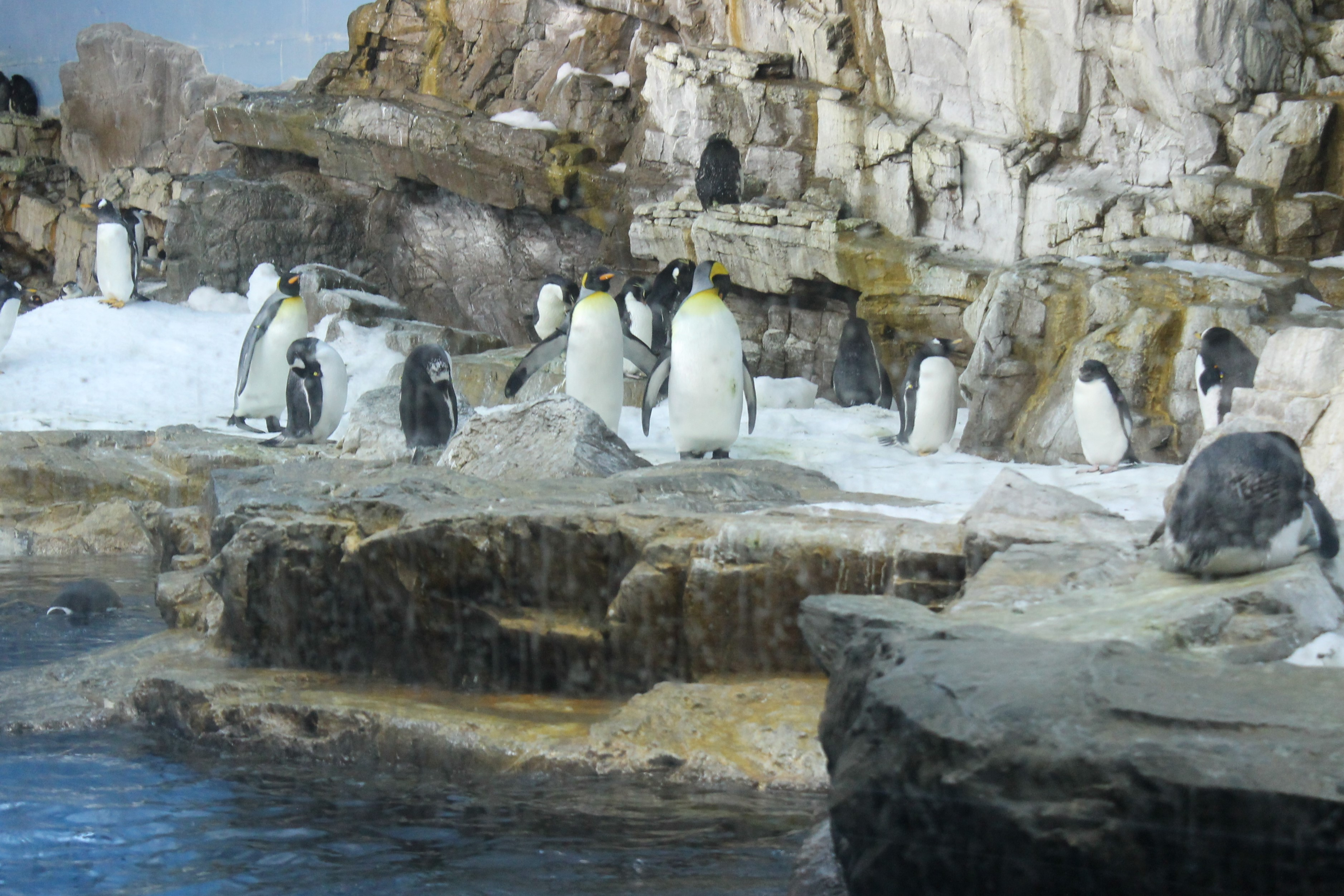
The Penguin House has some 250 birds.

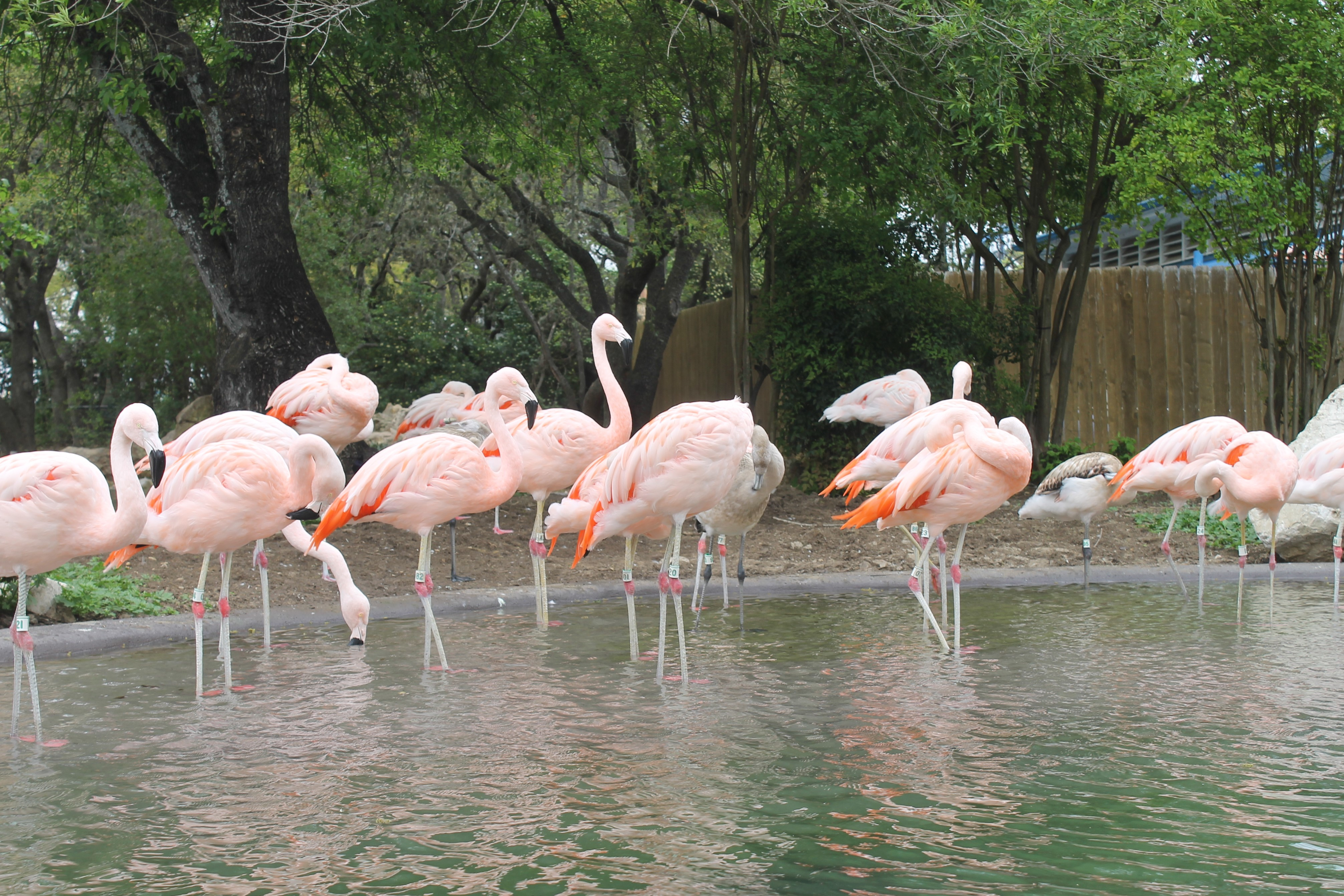
Flamingoes in an exhibit.

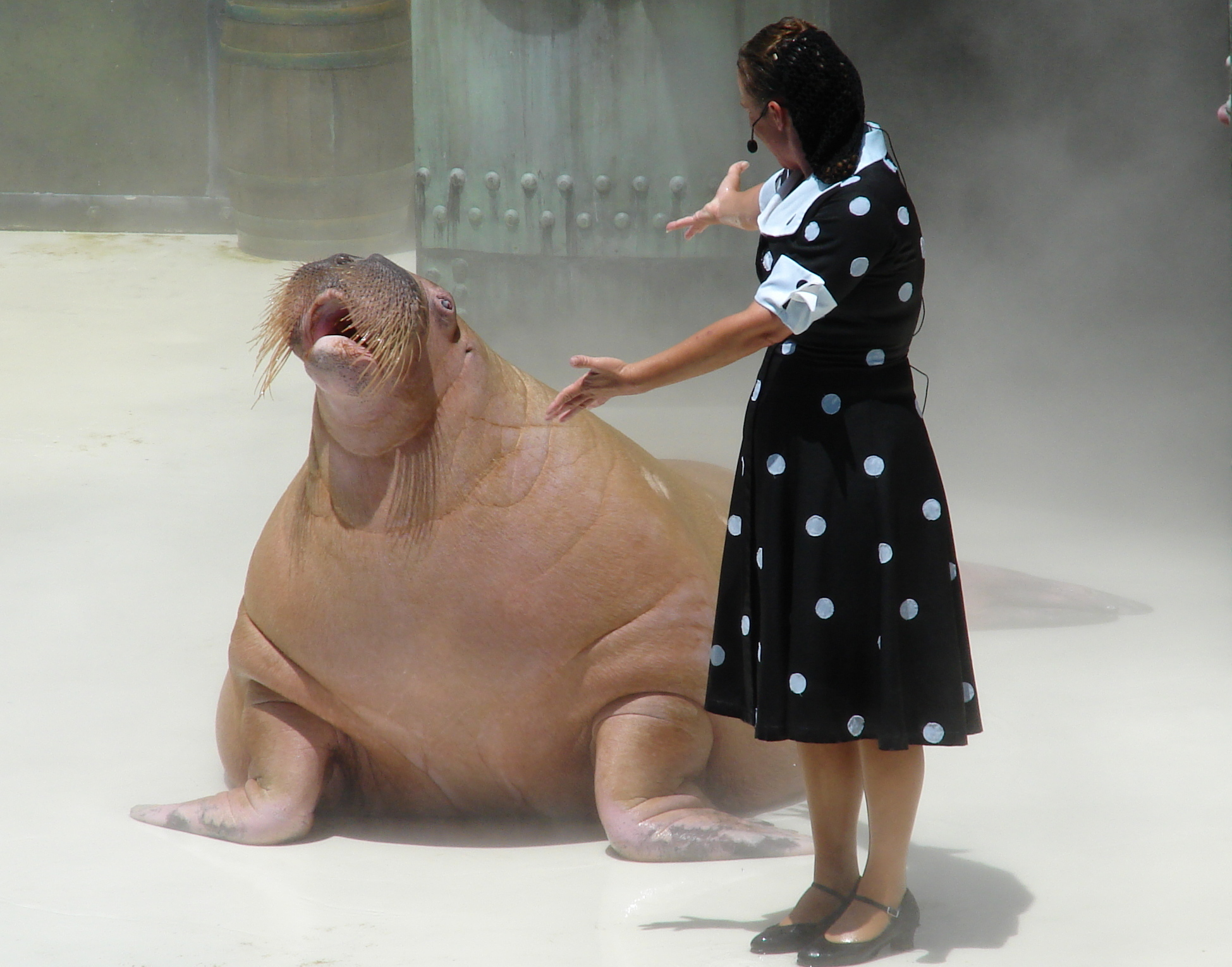
Walrus. (No Longer in the park)

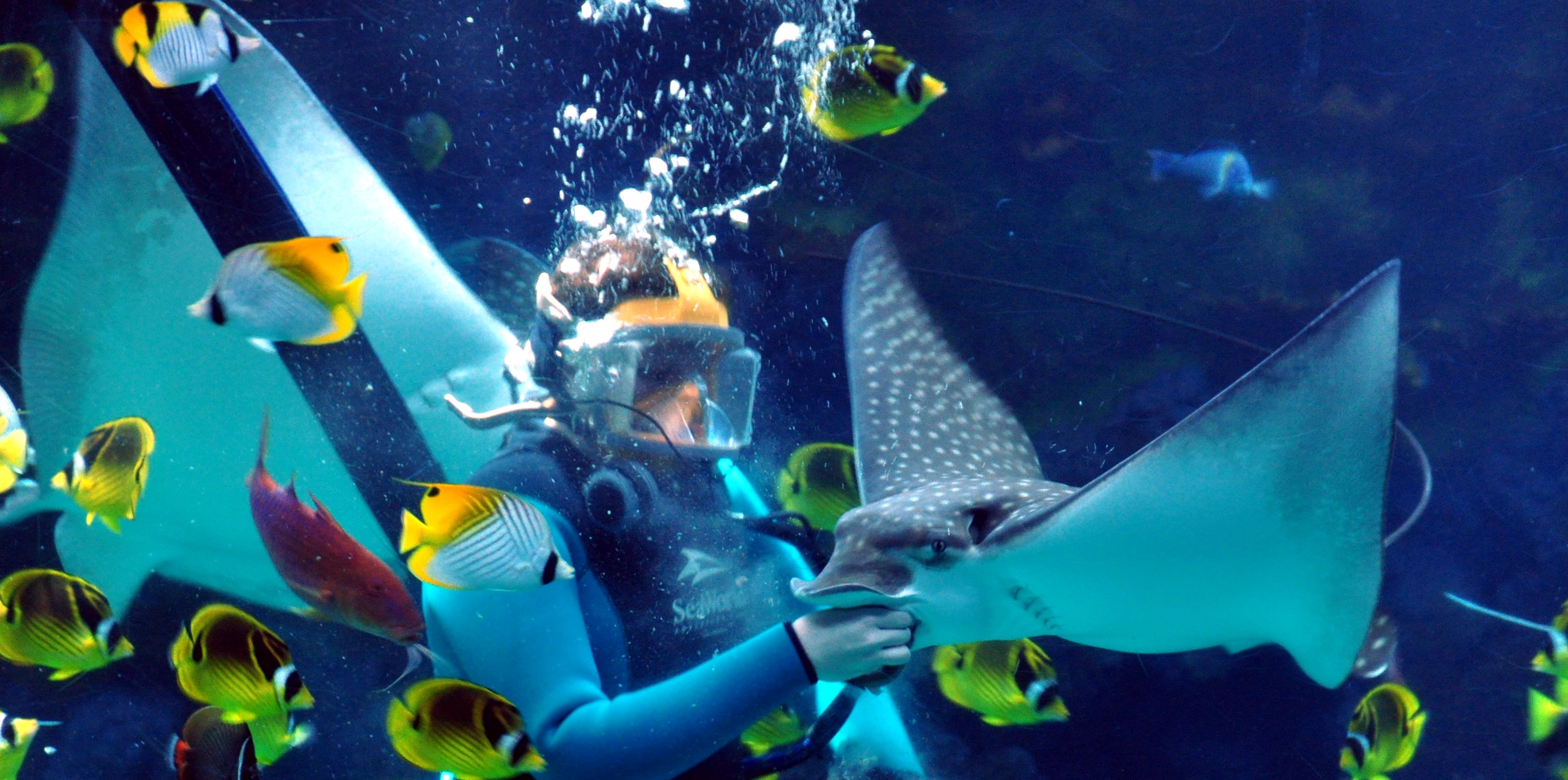
Stingrays being fed.

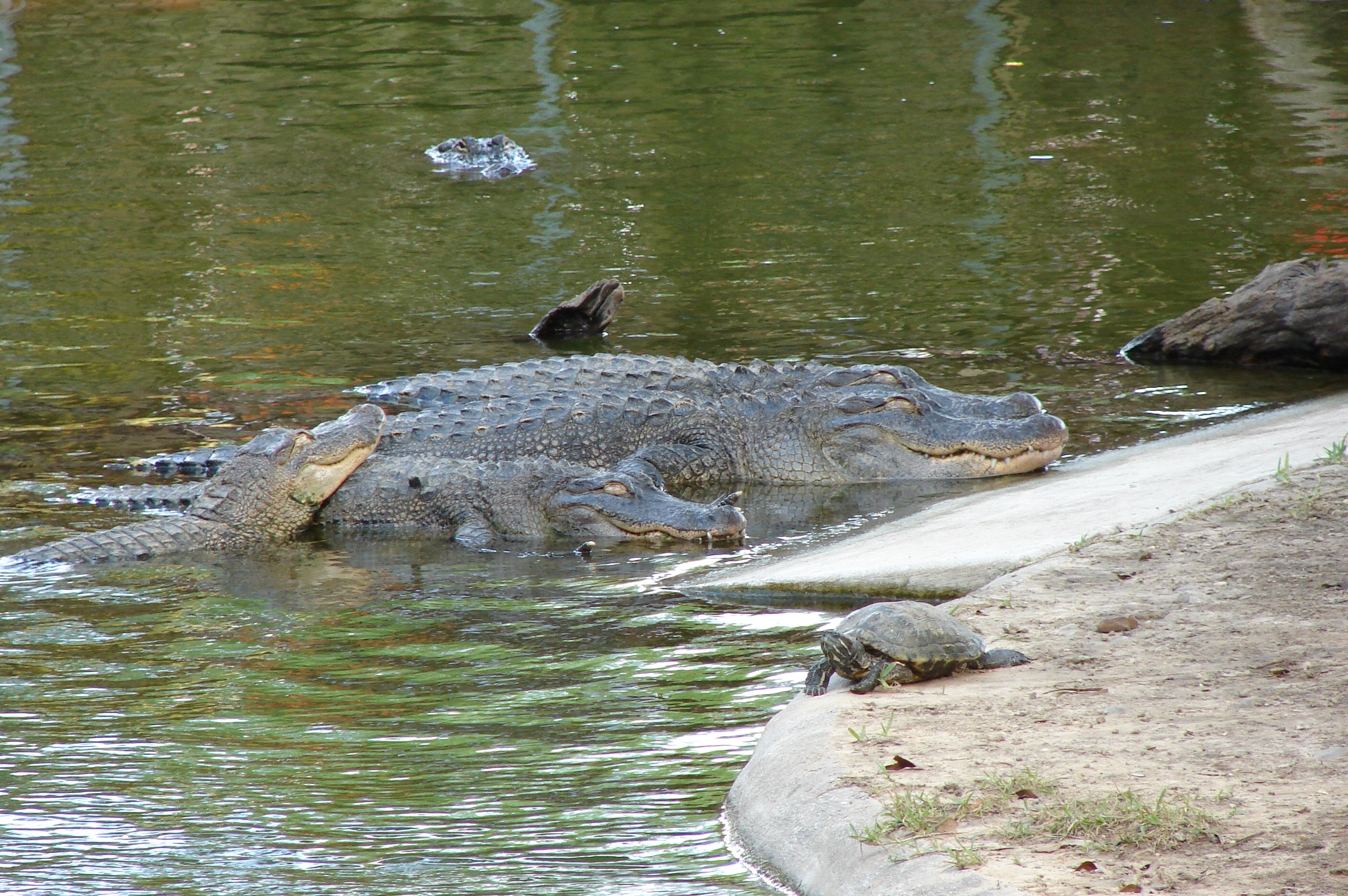
Alligators.
