= Raging Bull (roller coaster) =

Steel roller coaster at Six Flags Great America

- Raging Bull in August 2005

Six Flags Great America
- Location: Six Flags Great America
- Park section: Southwest Territory
- Coordinates: 42°21′57″N 87°56′14″W
- Status: Operating
- Soft opening date: April 29, 1999
- Opening date: May 1, 1999
- Replaced: Rolling Thunder

General statistics
- Type: Steel
- Manufacturer: Bolliger & Mabillard
- Designer: Werner Stengel
- Model: Hyper Coaster
- Lift/launch system: Chain lift hill
- Height: 202 ft (62 m)
- Drop: 208 ft (63 m)
- Length: 5,057 ft (1,541 m)
- Speed: 73 mph (117 km/h)
- Inversions: 0
- Duration: 2:30
- Max vertical angle: 65°
- Capacity: 1560 riders per hour
- Height restriction: 54 in (137 cm)
- Trains: 3 trains with 9 cars; riders arranged 4 across in a single row for a total of 36 riders per train
- Website: Official website
- Fast Lane available
- Must transfer from wheelchair
- Raging Bull at RCDB

Raging Bull is a steel roller coaster located at Six Flags Great America, an amusement park in Gurnee, Illinois, United States. The ride opened to the public on May 1, 1999, as the first hyper-twister roller coaster, the second Hyper Coaster model built by Bolliger & Mabillard, and the tallest and longest coaster in the park.

The 5,057-foot-long (1,541 m) ride is themed to a bull and is located in the park's Southwest Territory land. It reaches a height of 202 feet (62 m), dropping 208 feet (63 m) at a 65 degree angle into a below-ground tunnel to reach a maximum speed of 73 mph (117 km/h). Raging Bull has been praised for its sense of speed, airtime, and smooth ride experience by guests and critics, frequently ranking among the top fifty steel roller coasters in Amusement Today's Golden Ticket Awards.

== History ==
Premier Parks, the owner of Six Flags parks at the time, identified Six Flags Great America as a park that "needed [a] new thrill ride". Raging Bull was announced on October 21, 1998, set to become the tallest, fastest, and longest roller coaster at Six Flags Great America, and the first hypercoaster to feature a twister layout. Although it retained the titles of tallest and longest, the 'fastest' distinction was later surpassed by Maxx Force, which opened in 2019. Raging Bull was the park's most expensive roller coaster at the time, introduced as part of a $25 million ($49.4 million in 2025) investment into the park. Raging Bull would be manufactured by Bolliger & Mabillard, designed by Stengel Engineering, and themed and integrated into the park by Bleck & Bleck Architects. All three companies had previously worked with the park on other projects.

Raging Bull is located in the park's Southwest Territory. To make way for the construction of this themed land in 1996, Rolling Thunder, a bobsled roller coaster, was removed from the park and later relocated to Six Flags Great Escape. Raging Bull now occupies part of the space formerly used by Rolling Thunder.

The coaster's construction process required 40,000 man-hours of work, and its design and construction process spanned 18 months. The coaster underwent inspections by the park, the manufacturer, and the state of Illinois before being deemed ready for operation. Members of the press, American Coaster Enthusiasts, and Professional Bull Riders attended the ride's media preview on April 29, 1999, before the ride opened to the public on May 1. Upon opening, it became the second Hyper Coaster model constructed by Bolliger & Mabillard, closely following Apollo's Chariot at Busch Gardens Williamsburg, which had opened just over a month prior.

In 2007, Raging Bull was repainted by Baynum Solutions, a company that specializes in painting roller coasters. Their repainting process involves cleaning the structure, applying primer to key areas, then using brushes and rollers for the final coat. Raging Bull was the first of multiple rides Six Flags Great America worked with Baynum Solutions to repaint.

On June 15, 2016, Six Flags announced plans to introduce virtual reality headsets on Raging Bull. This addition aimed to make the coaster more thrilling by integrating immersive visuals. However, the headsets were ultimately implemented on Demon, another roller coaster at the park, instead of Raging Bull.

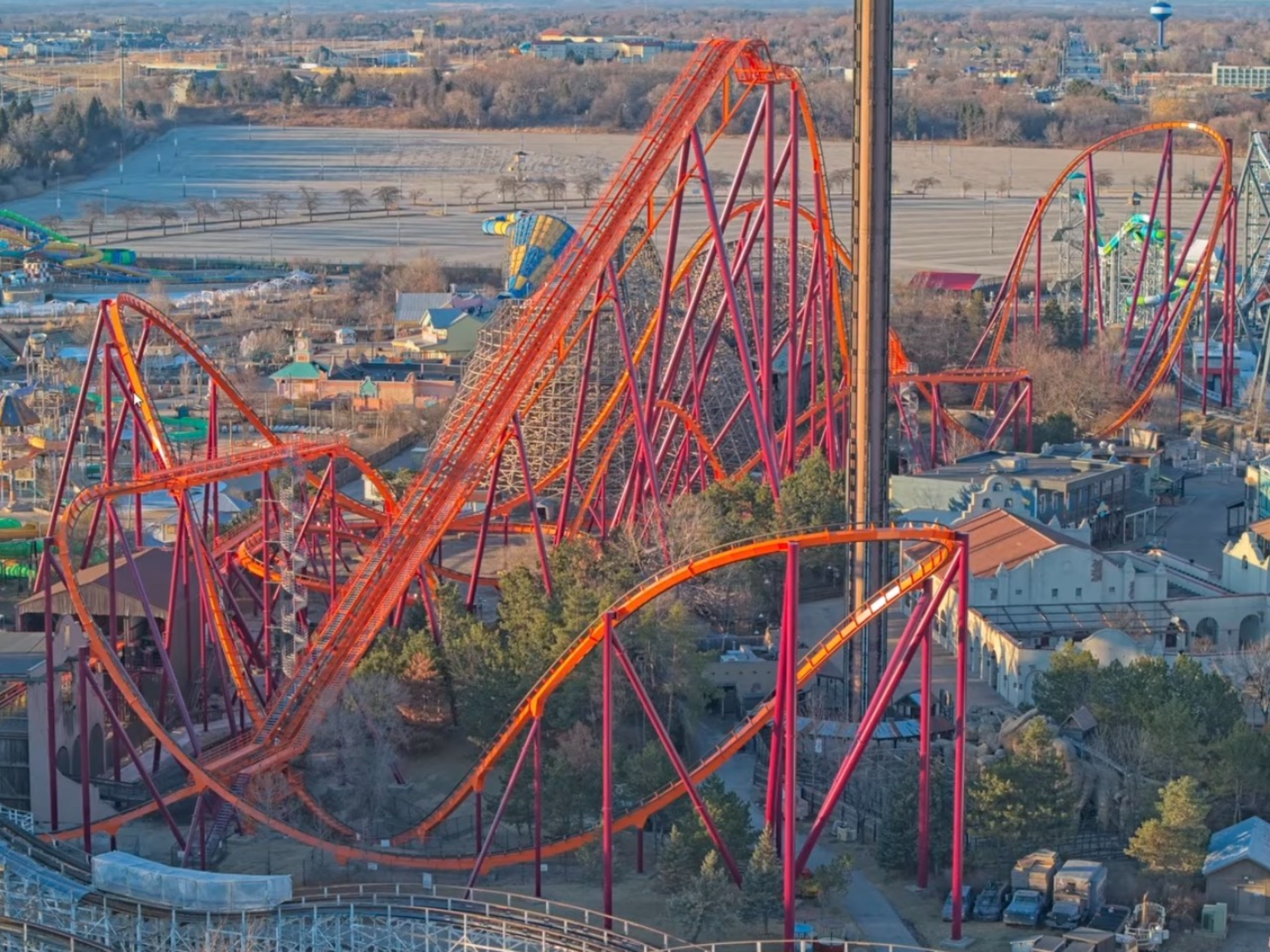
An overview of Raging Bull in February 2026 with refreshed paint colors

In 2025, Raging Bull was closed to be repainted once again, refreshing its original colors after they had faded since its previous repaint. Million Painting was contracted to paint the coaster. According to the park, approximately ten painters use aerial work platforms and spider baskets to first clean the track and supports using a pressure washer, then use rollers and brushes to apply the Sherwin-Williams Sher-Loxane 800 polysiloxane paint. The project required 350 US gallons (1,300 L; 290 imp gal) of orange paint for the track and 240 US gallons (910 L; 200 imp gal) or purple paint for the supports. The coaster closed on August 19, the day after the park moved to weekend-only operations, to allow the repaint to be completed ahead of winter weather. After being painted and tested, the ride reopened on October 3.

== Ride experience ==
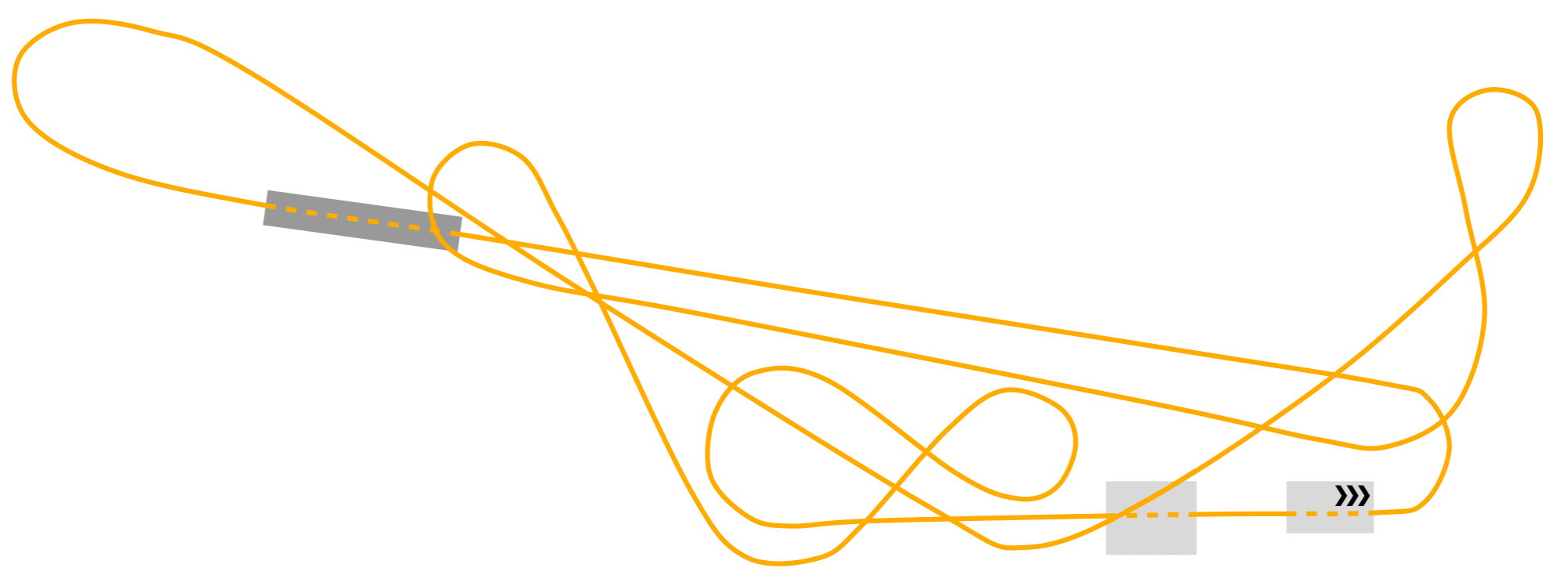
A top-down diagram of Raging Bull's layout

Raging Bull's twister layout as seen from Sky Trek Tower

Raging Bull features a twister layout which the park describes as similar to a "wooden 'cyclone-style' roller coaster", while still incorporating elements typical of hypercoasters, such as camelback hills designed to provide riders with airtime. The coaster's layout consists of two camelback hills and several banked turns, some of which the park marketed as "inclined loops", though they differ from true inclined loops as they do not invert. The ride additionally features a 208-foot (63 m), 65-degree drop from its 202-foot (62 m) chain lift hill, which leads into a 6-foot-deep (1.8 m), 127-foot-long (38.7 m) tunnel, where the coaster reaches its top speed of 73 miles per hour (117 km/h).

After exiting the station, the train takes a left-hand U-turn and begins to ascend the chain lift hill. At the peak, it traverses a pre-drop before descending into its main drop and passing through a tunnel. The track then rises into a 159-foot (48 m) hammerhead turn to the right, banked at 55 degrees. Following this, the train crosses back over the chain lift hill and climbs the ride's first camelback hill, which is equipped with a trim brake that may slow the train as it ascends. Next, the train navigates a high banked turn over the station, dips beneath the chain lift hill, and enters a second hammerhead turn, this time to the left. The track then makes a right-hand uphill turn into the mid-course brake run. After dropping off the brake run, the train passes the on-ride camera and crests the ride's second camelback hill. This hill leads into a three-quarter turn to the right that wraps around the first drop. The ride concludes with a descent to ground level, followed by a figure-eight turn. It then enters the final brake run, which passes through the ride's maintenance bay and returns to the station.

== Characteristics ==
=== Trains ===
Raging Bull operates with three trains, each featuring nine single-row, four-across cars. The 36-passenger trains allow the coaster to achieve a theoretical capacity of 1,560 riders per hour. Patented by Bolliger & Mabillard in 1999 for use on Raging Bull and Apollo's Chariot, each seat is equipped with a "clamshell" lap bar that secures passengers by contacting their thighs and stomach. Compared to over-the-shoulder restraints, the "clamshell" lap bar is designed to enhance the sensation of freedom, improve physical comfort, and allow riders to raise their arms. Simultaneously, it includes grab handles and ensures sufficient restraint by preventing excessive movement. Marketed as a novelty upon the coaster's opening, the side-less design of the trains was intended to create a sense of vulnerability and make the ride more thrilling.

Each train is designed to be 56 feet (17 m) long and 7.3 feet (2.21 m) wide. When empty, the first car of each train weighs 4,300 pounds (1,950 kg), while each subsequent car weighs 2,701 pounds (1,225 kg). The trains feature polyurethane wheels with a diameter of 13.9 inches (354 mm). The trains are primarily black with maroon seats, while the lap bar restraints are colored teal, red, or yellow, depending on the train. The front of each train displays the coaster's logo.

=== Track ===
Non-heartlined track (left) versus heartlined track (right)

The coaster's 5,057 feet (1,541 m) of steel track is painted orange with unpainted rails, while the track's supports are painted maroon. The ride was constructed using 1,535 short tons (3,070,000 lb) of steel and 12,000 bolts. Raging Bull's chain lift hill is 445 feet (135.5 m) long, angled at 26 degrees, powered by a 247 kilowatt motor, and reaches a height of 202 feet (62 m).

Raging Bull uses heartlining – banking the track around a point approximately level with riders' hearts – to provide a smoother ride experience. Heartlining reduces torque and abrupt acceleration on riders during turns, providing a smoother and more comfortable ride. Raging Bull's heartline is located 3.9 feet (1.2 m) above the track.

=== Theme ===
Raging Bull is located in the park's Southwest Territory, a themed land based on cattle towns of the American West during the 19th century. The coaster's station is designed to resemble a ruined southwestern mission. The narrative behind the coaster centers on a bull, the coaster's eponym, which forced residents to flee their town and construct the mission and courtyard now featured in the park.

== Incidents ==
On May 3, 2003, 11-year-old Erica Emmons from Gary, Indiana, collapsed on Raging Bull's exit platform after becoming unresponsive while riding the coaster with her aunt. After being assisted out of her seat, a ride supervisor trained in cardiopulmonary resuscitation (CPR) attempted to revive her for approximately ten minutes. Emergency medical technicians from the Gurnee Fire Department arrived shortly before 12:30 pm and continued CPR. She was transported to St. Therese Medical Center in Waukegan, Illinois, where she was pronounced dead at 12:57 pm. Initial reports suggested she may have choked on a piece of gum or candy; a coroner noted she was carrying both, and the supervisor who performed CPR reported removing a "bluish, greenish" substance from her throat. Following the incident, the park added additional ride signage explicitly warning against gum and candy. In December, an investigation determined that choking was not the cause of her death. Instead, she was found to have died from cardiomegaly, a condition about which she had previously consulted a cardiologist.

== Reception ==
Raging Bull has been generally well received by guests and critics. In the coaster's inaugural year, American Coaster Enthusiasts member Ron Magen praised the ride's airtime and remarked, "This ride is fantastic... It's really smooth and has almost no down time. I'd place it in my top three." Paul Ruben, editor of the amusement park magazine Park World, commended the ride's speed, likening the experience to "a dog with its head out of a car window". In 2002, Joseph Lopez of the Northwest Herald described the ride as "smooth as silk" and noted that he, along with several other guests, regarded Raging Bull as the park's best coaster at the time. However, others have since criticized the ride in comparison to newer coasters of the same model. Some riders report a preference for the coaster's experience in the back row, noting enhanced sensations during the initial drop; in the back row of a roller coaster, riders typically crest the lift hill at a higher speed, resulting in increased airtime.

In Raging Bull's opening year, Six Flags Great America's attendance reached 3.1 million – a seven percent increase over the previous year, boosting the park from nineteenth to eighteenth most-visited amusement park in North America. Connie Costello, the park's public relations manager, reported "a phenomenal reaction" to the coaster, describing it as the park's most successful ride since Batman: The Ride opened in 1992. She additionally commented that the coaster was drawing large crowds from across the Midwest.

From 1999 to 2022, Raging Bull consistently ranked among the top fifty steel roller coasters in Amusement Today's Golden Ticket Awards every year the poll was run. It debuted at position fourteen in 1999 before peaking at number nine in 2005.

Golden Ticket Awards: Top steel Roller Coasters
Year									1998	1999
Ranking									–	14
Year	2000	2001	2002	2003	2004	2005	2006	2007	2008	2009
Ranking	12	11	14 (tie)	17	14	9	11	12	11	14
Year	2010	2011	2012	2013	2014	2015	2016	2017	2018	2019
Ranking	16	24	19	31	31	31	32 (tie)	34	48	46
Year	2020	2021	2022	2023	2024	2025	2026			
Ranking	N/A	44	38	–	–	36	44			
