= Viper (Six Flags Great America) =

Wooden roller coaster at Six Flags Great America

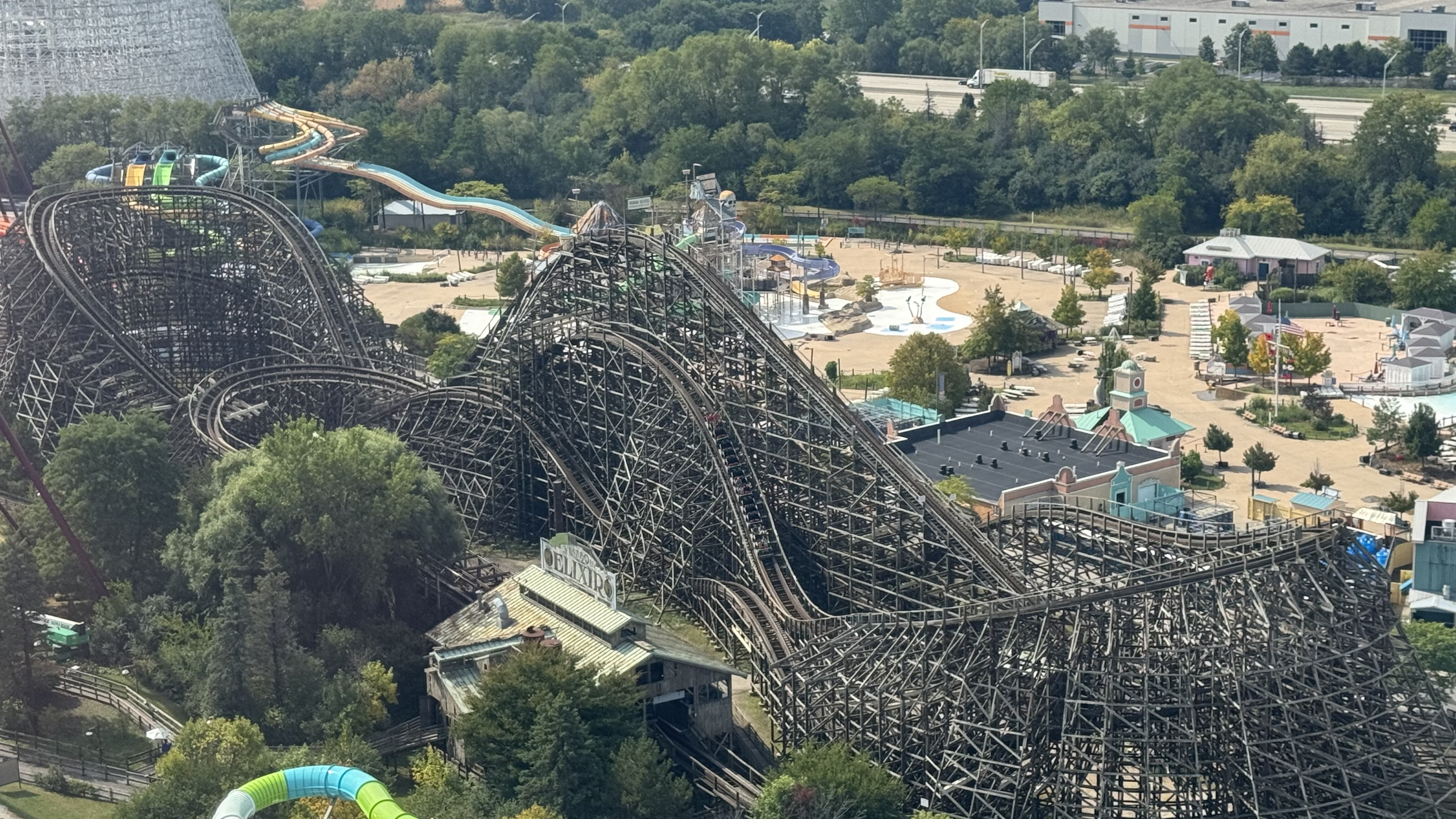
- Viper's layout as seen from Sky Trek Tower

Six Flags Great America
- Location: Six Flags Great America
- Park section: Southwest Territory
- Coordinates: 42°22′05″N 87°56′14″W
- Status: Operating
- Opening date: April 29, 1995

General statistics
- Type: Wood
- Manufacturer: Six Flags
- Designer: Stand Company
- Track layout: Coney Island Cyclone (mirror image)
- Lift/launch system: Chain lift hill
- Height: 100 ft (30 m)
- Drop: 80 ft (24 m)
- Length: 3,458 ft (1,054 m)
- Speed: 50 mph (80 km/h)
- Inversions: 0
- Duration: 1:45
- Max vertical angle: 53°
- Capacity: 1000 riders per hour
- G-force: 3.6
- Height restriction: 48 in (122 cm)
- Trains: 2 trains with 5 cars; riders arranged 2 across in 3 rows for a total of 30 riders per train
- Website: Official website
- Fast Lane available
- Must transfer from wheelchair
- Viper at RCDB

Viper is a wooden roller coaster located at Six Flags Great America, an amusement park in Gurnee, Illinois, United States. Constructed for an industry-estimated price of $4 million in 1995 ($8.45 million in 2025), Viper was intended to increase interest in and attendance at the park. The roller coaster was designed by Six Flags Great America and Dennis Starkey of the Stand Company, with a layout similar to that of the Coney Island Cyclone. The ride opened to the public on April 29, 1995; the following year, it became a part of the park's Southwest Territory themed land which was created around it.

The ride is themed to a snake-infested abandoned factory, featuring related theming in its station. Viper's 30-passenger trains traverse its 3,458-foot-long (1,054 m) track in 1 minute 45 seconds, reaching a maximum height of 100 feet (30 m) and a top speed of 50 miles per hour (80 km/h). Since opening, Viper has been praised by critics for its sense of speed, classic design, and moments of airtime, while its smoothness has received mixed reviews.

== History ==
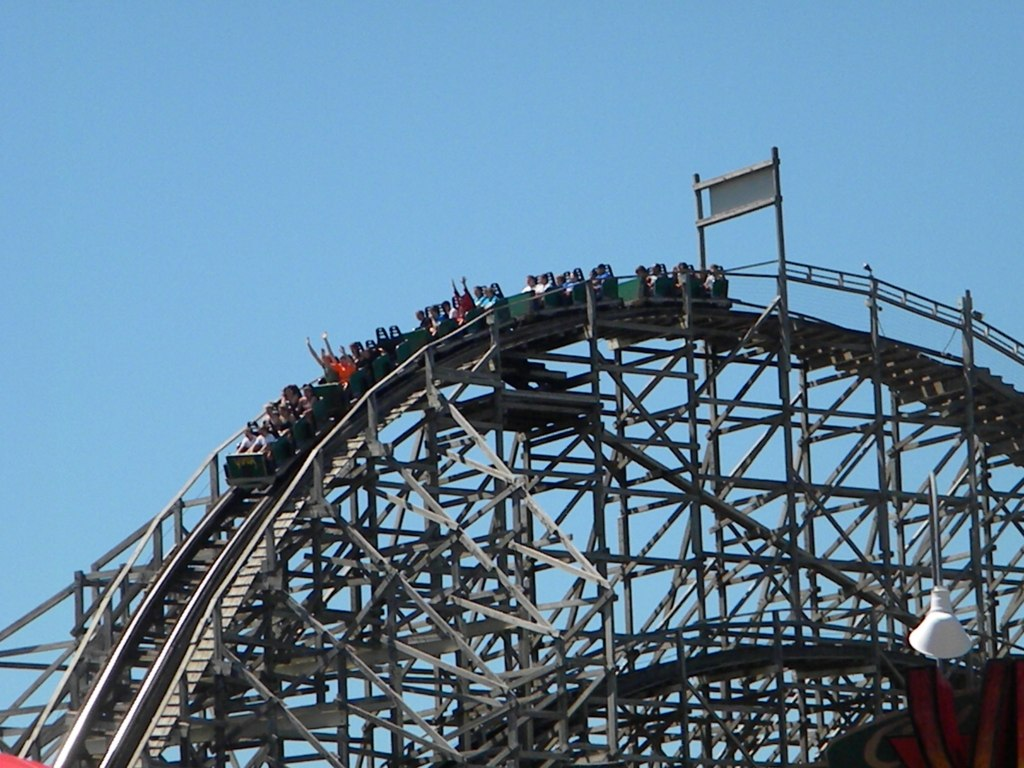
Viper's first drop

Following the 1994 season, described as an "off year" for attendance, the park's managers expressed a desire for the introduction of Viper to generate interest for the park and attract more visitors. Viper was designed by Six Flags Great America and Dennis Starkey of the Stand Company. The latter had previously worked for Curtis D. Summers, the designer of the park's other wooden roller coaster at the time, American Eagle.

According to Six Flags Great America spokeswoman Connie Costello, Viper was inspired by the 1927 Coney Island Cyclone, part of the "golden age of roller coasters" – a period in the 1920s when over 1,500 wooden roller coasters were in operation. She noted that by the 1980s, less than 100 wooden roller coasters operated in North America, but they were "growing in popularity" as the amusement park industry observed guests' continued interest in classic roller coasters. Viper's layout was designed as a near mirror image of the Coney Island Cyclone, though with some modifications. She described Viper as a "complement" to American Eagle; though they are both wooden coasters, Viper's design features a twister layout while American Eagle has an out-and-back layout.

Construction of Viper began on September 7, 1994. By January 1, 1995, approximately forty percent of the roller coaster's structure had been erected and its track was beginning to be installed. The park's vice president of maintenance stated that despite poor weather over the winter, work was still able to be carried out during all but three scheduled days. The roller coaster was constructed by the park in conjunction with Rygiel Construction and required 30,000 person-hours of work by a team of 40 carpenters working six-day weeks. Viper was built by constructing sections of the roller coaster on the ground, then lifting them into place using a crane. According to an industry estimate, the attraction cost $4 million ($8.45 million in 2025) in total.

Viper opened to the public on April 29, 1995, as part of the Hometown Square area of the park, sitting on the park's northern perimeter at the time. In 1996, the year following Viper's opening, the Southwest Territory land opened at the park, a themed land based on cattle towns of the American West during the 19th century; Viper became part of this land.

During the summer of 2013 and Fright Fest in 2017, Viper's trains were flipped to run backwards for a limited time. Viper was run backwards along with other rides in the park, including Batman: The Ride and American Eagle.

== Ride experience ==
A top-down diagram of the ride's layout

Viper has an oval-shaped twister layout with multiple levels. It is modeled after the Coney Island Cyclone, being a near mirror image, though with an extra double down element and a maximum height of 100 feet (30 m) compared with Cyclone's maximum height of 75 feet (23 m). Its layout features multiple banked turns, eleven drops, and nine moments of air time. One ride lasts approximately 1 minute 45 seconds.

After exiting the station, the train makes two left turns through the ride's support structure before climbing a chain lift hill to a height of 100 feet (30 m). The train then descends an 80-foot-tall (24 m) drop, reaching a top speed of 50 miles per hour (80 km/h). After passing below a later section of track, the train rises into an elevated turnaround before dropping beneath the ride's supports once more and ascending a camelback hill. This is followed by a second elevated turnaround which ends with a double down. The train then navigates another camelback hill and raised turnaround before a series of hills split by a third turnaround. After a final turn, trains enter the ride's final brake run before returning to the station.

== Characteristics ==
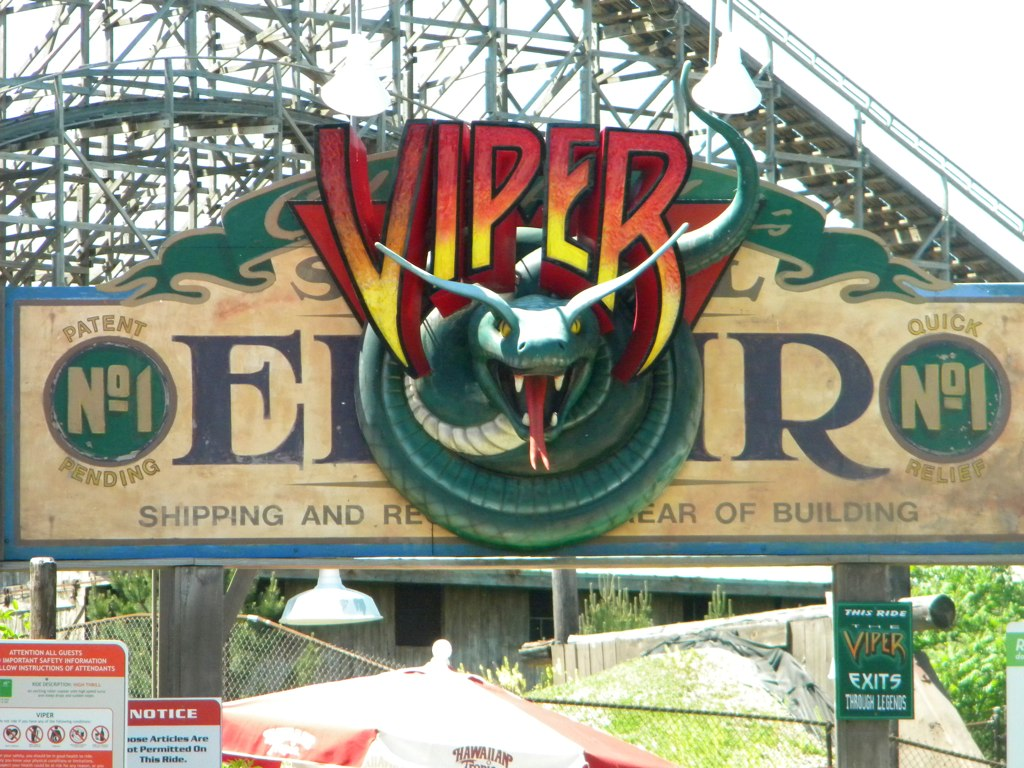
Viper's entrance sign

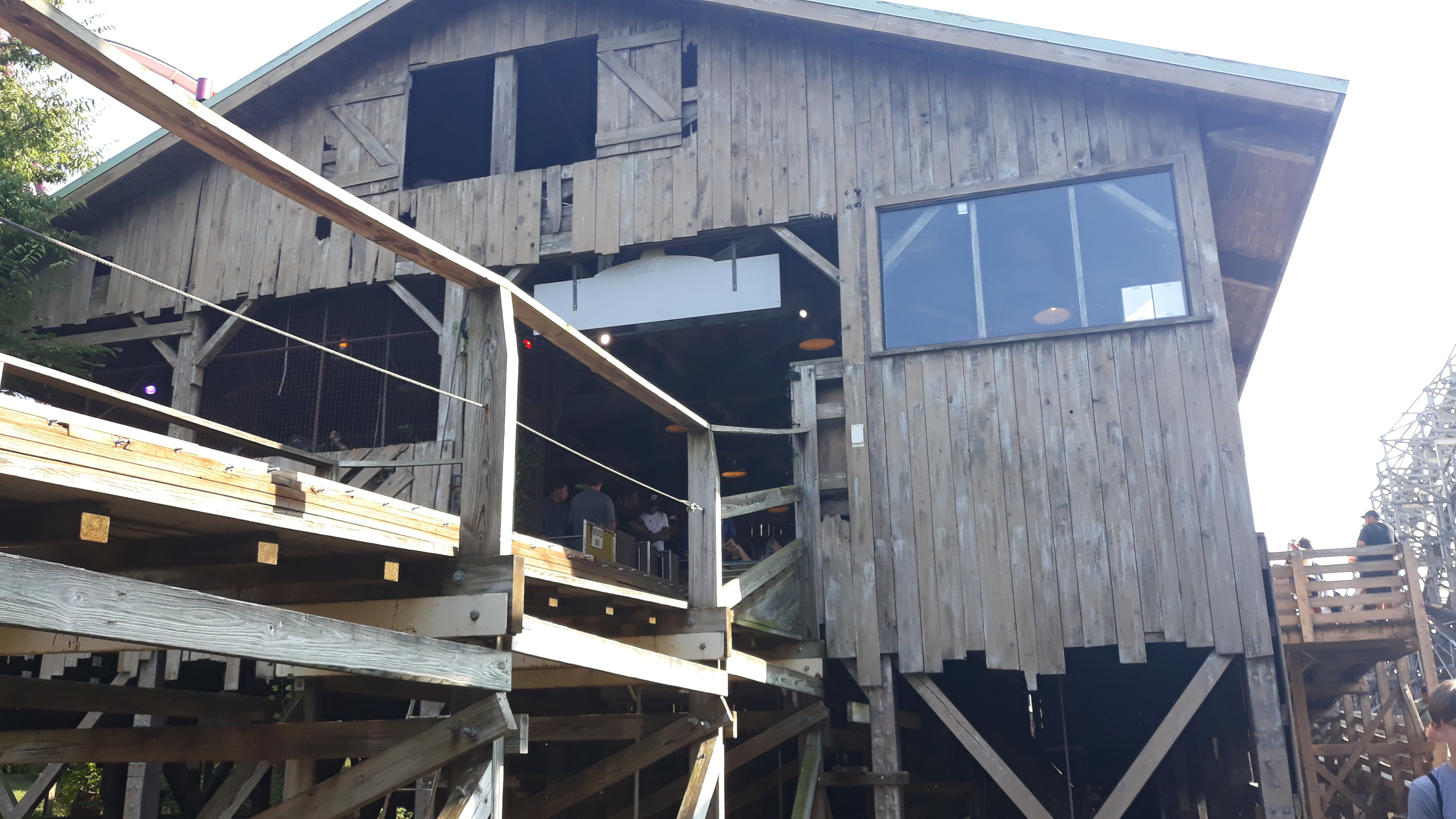
Viper's station is themed to an abandoned snake oil elixir factory.

Viper operates with two Philadelphia Toboggan Coasters-manufactured trains of five cars; each car features three rows of two seats for a total of thirty riders per train. This allows for a theoretical capacity of 1,000 riders per hour. The ride's 100-foot-tall (30 m) chain lift hill is 255 feet (77.7 m) long, angled at 27 degrees, and powered by a 162.5 kilowatt motor. The roller coaster was constructed using 700,000 board feet (1,652 cubic meters) of unpainted southern yellow pine supported by 1,200 concrete footers 2 feet (0.61 m) in diameter and over 5 feet (1.5 m) in height.

Viper is located in the park's Southwest Territory themed land. According to the ride's backstory, the station is located in what was previously "Col B. Peabody's Snake Oil Elixir factory", illustrated by snake-related theming within the station such as snakeskin on its walls. After disembarking the ride, riders exit through the Col. J.R. Peabody and Sons Mercantile Co. gift shop.

== Reception and awards ==
Viper has been generally well received. Paul Ruben, then editor of the Park World magazine, described the ride as "unrelenting", praising how the ride enhanced riders' sensation of speed by "rushing past stationary objects". He additionally noted that he preferred Viper to the original Coney Island Cyclone. While Ruben called Viper "one of the smoothest" roller coasters he had ridden when it opened, others later described it as "rough", "bumpy", and "rickety". Riders have also praised the ride's classic character, as well as its moments of airtime, especially during the double down element.

Viper contributed to the Guinness World Records title for the most wooden roller coaster track in a park awarded to Six Flags Great America in 2014 upon the opening of Goliath. The track length totaled 16,558 feet (5,047 m) between Viper, Goliath, American Eagle, and Little Dipper. Kings Island later surpassed Six Flags Great America's record with the debut of Mystic Timbers.

In 2010, USA Today named Viper as one of the top ten best roller coasters in the United States. Additionally, Viper charted in Amusement Today's Golden Ticket Awards for the fifty best wooden roller coasters in the world until 2014, peaking at a rank of 19 in 1999.

Golden Ticket Awards: Top wood Roller Coasters
Year									1998	1999
Ranking									24	19
Year	2000	2001	2002	2003	2004	2005	2006	2007	2008	2009
Ranking	24	36	24	23	29	26	32	37	30	30
Year	2010	2011	2012	2013	2014	2015	2016	2017	2018	2019
Ranking	34	41	26	44 (tie)	49	–	–	–	–	–
Year	2020	2021	2022	2023	2024	2025	2026			
Ranking	N/A	–	–	–	–	–	–			

== Incidents ==
On June 25, 1997, a 14-year-old boy's right hand was injured after becoming caught between the train and the station platform for a distance of 30 feet (9.1 m) as the train entered the station. Officials stated that it appeared that his arm was outside of the train, breaking park rules. He was freed by firefighters using a miniature hydraulic rescue tool and airlifted to the Children's Hospital of Wisconsin.

== See also ==
- Georgia Cyclone – a defunct mirror image of the Coney Island Cyclone at Six Flags Over Georgia
- Texas Cyclone – a mirror image of the Coney Island Cyclone at the defunct Six Flags AstroWorld
- Psyclone – a defunct replica of the Coney Island Cyclone at Six Flags Magic Mountain
