= Zoomerang =

Zoomerang may refer to:

- Zoomerang App, AI Video Editing App
- Zoomerang (Alabama Adventure), a defunct roller coaster at Alabama Adventure
- Zoomerang (Lake Compounce), a roller coaster at Lake Compounce, Connecticut
- Zoomerang (survey tool), an online survey tool owned by SurveyMonkey
- Zoomerang Tour, a 1993 Australian concert tour by U2
