= Southwest Territory (Six Flags Great America) =

Wild West themed land

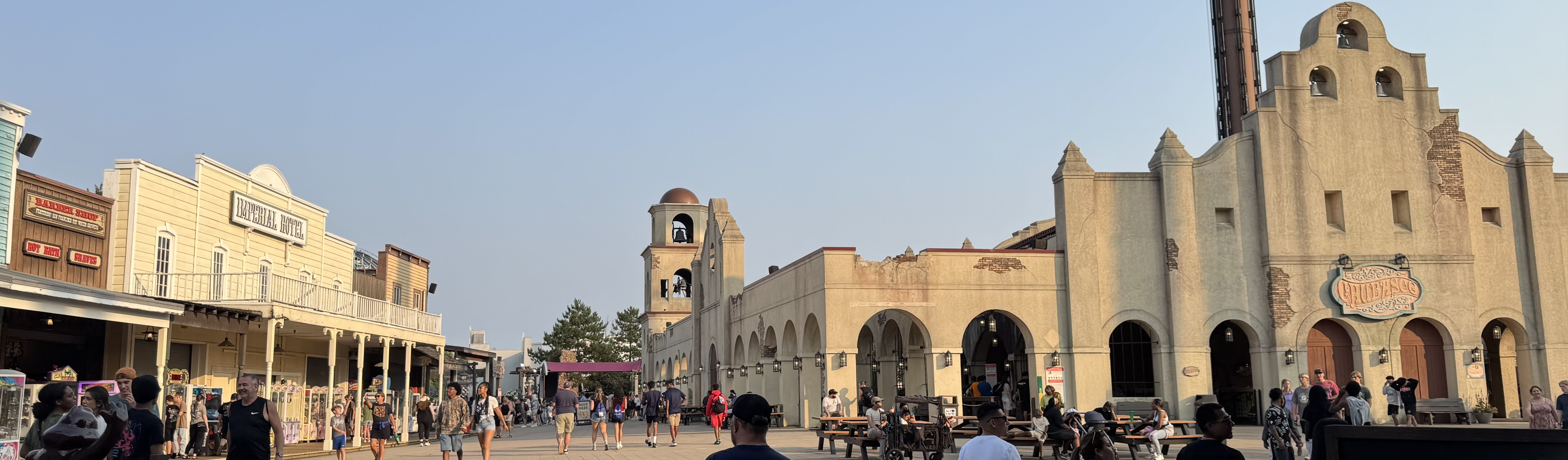
- An overview of Southwest Territory.
- Interactive map of Southwest Territory
- Location: Six Flags Great America, Gurnee, Illinois, United States
- Coordinates: 42°21′57″N 87°56′10″W
- Theme: The Wild West
- Area: 11 acres (4.5 ha)

Attractions
- Total: 6
- Roller coasters: 2

Six Flags Great America
- Status: Operating
- Opened: 1996

Southwest Territory is an 11-acre (4.5 ha) themed land at Six Flags Great America in Gurnee, Illinois. The Wild West-themed area opened in 1996 for the park's 20th anniversary, and was the largest expansion since its opening in 1976. It features six total attractions, including 2 roller coasters, Viper and Raging Bull. The area is built outside of the park's original circular layout.

Previous plans to build a Southwest-themed land as an expansion were made when the park was under the operation of the Marriott Corporation. This themed area was planned to open outside the park's original layout in 1979, but it never materialized. Six Flags began construction on the Southwest Territory area starting in 1995, building in three phases.

== History ==
=== The Great Southwest concept (1977–1982) ===
A concept painting of The Great Southwest, which was planned to open in 1979.

During the initial planning of Marriott's Great America in Gurnee, a seventh themed land named The Great Southwest, was intended to be added the park as its first major expansion after opening. The land was planned to open in 1979, but the plans never materialized.

Early signs of another land came in 1977, the park's second season, with the addition of the Southern Cross Skyride. Manufactured by the Swiss firm Von Roll, the Southern Cross was one of the tallest and longest gondola rides that the company ever produced for an amusement park, at 120 feet in the air. The reason for the height was that the Southern Cross intersected perpendicularly and also passed over the Delta Flyer/Eagle's Flight skyride. The Southern Cross was a round trip to the future plot of The Great Southwest, which was just a large pile of dirt. After the park missed its intended 1979 opening for the land, the Southern Cross operated for just three more seasons before being removed after the 1982 season.

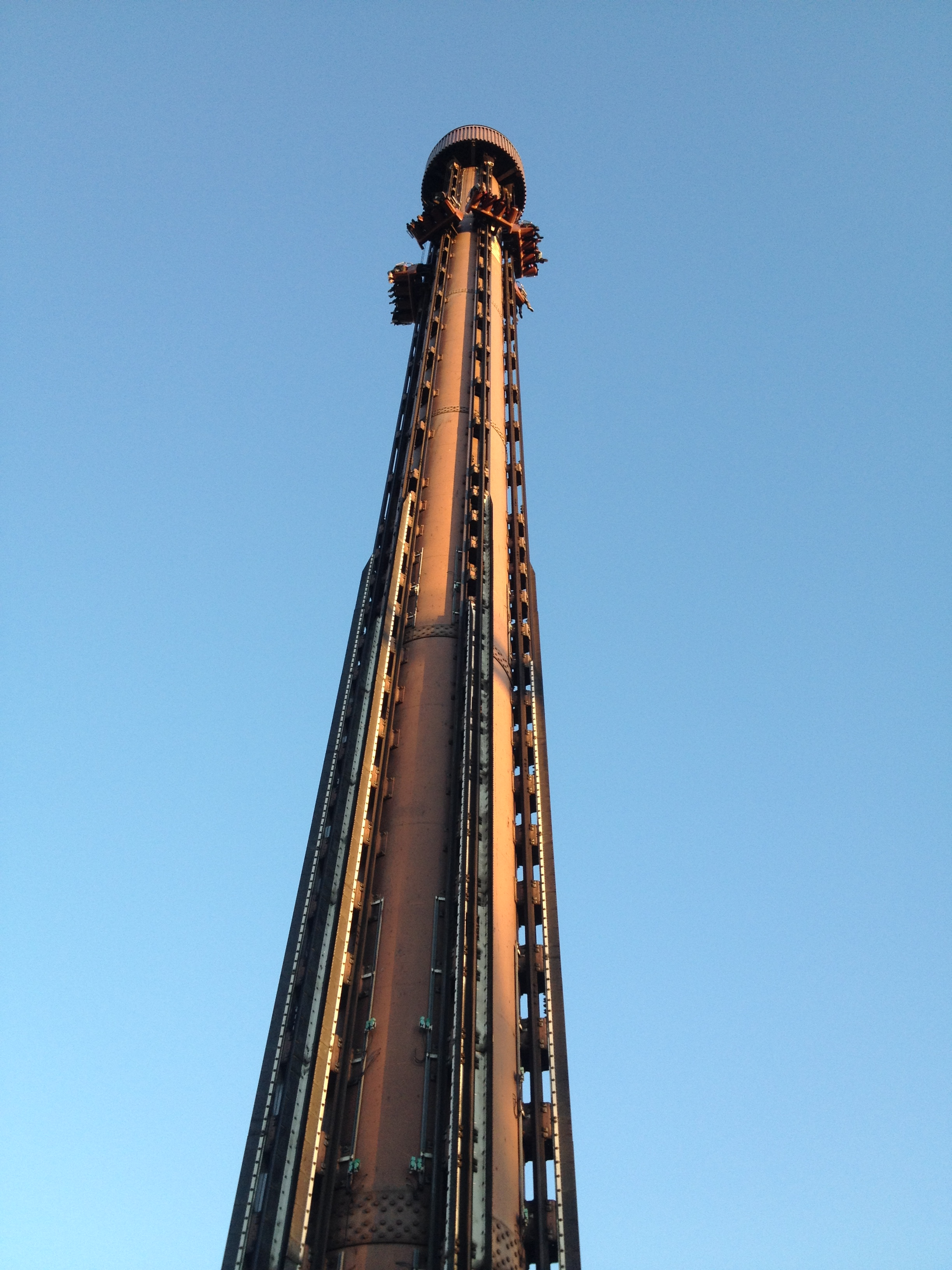
The Giant Drop, one of the attractions in Southwest Territory

=== Southwest Territory expansion phases (1995–1997) ===
==== Pre-phases: Viper (1995) ====
After years of planning, Six Flags finally began to develop The Great Southwest in time for the park's 20th anniversary, now known as Southwest Territory. Although not announced, the park would open Southwest Territory in three annual phases from 1995 until 1997. The first of these phases was Viper, an all-new wooden roller coaster. It was the first roller coaster to be designed and installed directly by Six Flags. It was modeled after the Coney Island Cyclone, and constructed from 700,000 board-feet of southern pine. The ride's station is themed after Colonel Peabody's Snake Oil Elixir Pharmaceutical Factory, a facility which was abandoned and overrun with snakes, hence the ride's name. As Southwest Territory was still relatively a secret, Viper was listed as being part of Hometown Square.

==== Phase 1: Southwest Territory opening (1996) ====
For the 1996 season, the second phase of the Southwest Territory expansion came in the form of an eleven-acre themed land that opened adjacent to Viper, and would be built in three different phases. It was built outside of the park's original layout design called the "Duell loop". The Old West Town featured 1800s-themed western-style retail stores and restaurants, as well as a saloon split across two sides of a single block. The front part of the area's signature Spanish Mission opened, with the back part with the Chubasco tea cups still under construction.

==== Phase 2: Giant Drop (1997) ====
For the 1997 season, the Giant Drop debuted as the second official phase of Southwest Territory. It is a 227-foot tall Intamin drop tower, themed after an "Ore excavator" owned by the Loco Diablo Mining Company. Construction on the attraction began in October 1996 and had completed construction in December 1996.

As part of the ride's opening ceremony, 200 couples from throughout the Midwest participated in a wedding ceremony on the ride. The couples were pronounced husband and wife just before they dropped, and the wedding ceremony was held in the Southwest Territory Amphitheater. The mass wedding ceremony took place in the Southwest Amphitheater. Also that year, the backside of the Spanish Mission was completed.

==== Phase 3: Raging Bull (1999) ====
The third and final phase was built for the 1999 season with the addition of a Bolliger & Mabillard hypercoaster on the former site of Rolling Thunder. This attraction would be Raging Bull, and is the park's tallest roller coaster. The ride is themed after a ferocious beast that once terrorized the citizens of Southwest Territory.

=== 2000s–present: Ride removals and demolition ===
Trailblazer, a Zamperla Rainbow attraction, was removed from the area before the 2007 season. To make way for the construction of Justice League: Battle for Metropolis, the Southwest Territory Amphitheater was demolished and the section where it resided was annexed into the mini-area Metropolis Plaza.

== Attractions ==
Thrill level (out of 5)
1 (low) 2 (mild) 3 (moderate) 4 (high) 5 (aggressive)

=== Roller coasters ===
Southwest Territory has two total roller coasters.

Ride	Picture	Year opened	Manufacturer	Model	Description	Thrill level
Viper		1995	Six Flags	Wooden roller coaster	In-house constructed wooden roller coaster, a mirrored clone of Coney Island Cyclone.	4
Raging Bull		1999	Bolliger & Mabillard	Twister Hypercoaster (Hyper-twister)	Hyper-twister roller coaster. It is the tallest roller coaster located at Six Flags Great America, at a height of 208 feet (63 m).	5

=== Flat rides ===
In total, Southwest Territory features four attractions. Only one attraction has been removed, Trailblazer, in 2006.

Ride	Picture	Year opened	Manufacturer	Model	Description	Thrill level
Chubasco		1996	Zamperla	Teacups	A teacup attraction located inside of a Spanish mission.	3
Ricochet		1977	Huss Rides	Swing Around	A "Swing Around" attraction built by Huss Rides, painted with cow spots.	3
River Rocker		1996	Zamperla	Bounty Ride	A pirate ship attraction, swinging back and forth.	2
Giant Drop		1997	Intamin	Giant/Multi Drop	A 227 feet (69 m) high drop tower set in the "Loco Diablo Mine."	4

== Restaurants ==
- Fiesta Fries Cantina
- Mijo's Authentic Mexican Food
- The Oasis
- Six Below
- Windy City Sports Bar & Grill

=== Former restaurants ===
- Crazy Buffalo Saloon
- JB's Barbecue and Sports Bar
- Waterin' Hole

== Entertainment ==
=== Southwest Territory Amphitheater ===
The Southwest Territory Amphitheater was a large, outdoor stunt arena that was built in 1993 for The Batman Stunt Show. With the debut of Southwest Territory in 1996, the theater received a renovation to fit in with the new land, and was renamed the Southwest Territory Amphitheater. That year, it featured the Warner Bros. Western Stunt Show, a crossover show that features characters from many different Western films and television shows, including Maverick, F Troop, and Blazing Saddles. In 2007, the theater's last major production came in the form of Operation SpyGirl, a stunt show created by Joel Surnow, co-creator of the TV series 24. In 2015, it was finally demolished to make way for Justice League: Battle for Metropolis and the new Metropolis Plaza area.
