= Wildcat (Lake Compounce) =

Roller coaster at Lake Compounce

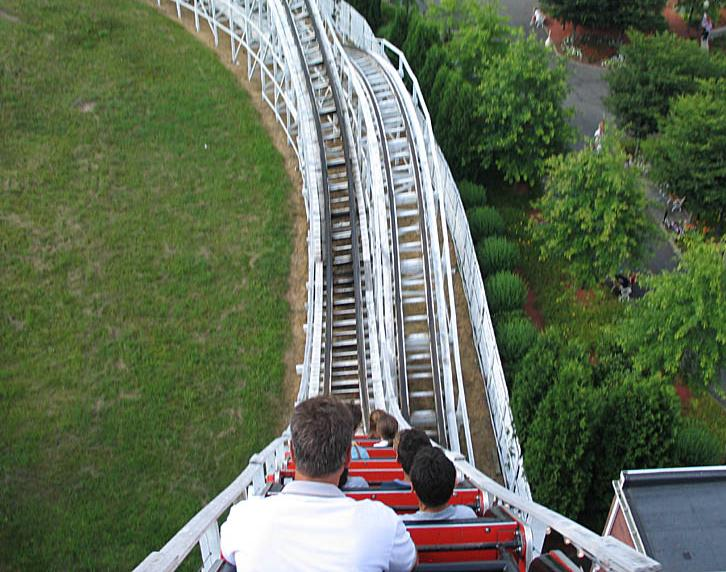

Lake Compounce
- Location: Lake Compounce
- Coordinates: 41°38′27″N 72°55′23.3″W
- Status: Operating
- Opening date: 1927
- Replaced: Green Dragon

General statistics
- Type: Wood – Twister
- Manufacturer: Philadelphia Toboggan Coasters
- Designer: Herbert Paul Schmeck and Dinn Corporation
- Lift/launch system: Chain Lift Hill
- Height: 85 ft (26 m)
- Drop: 78 ft (24 m)
- Length: 2,746 ft (837 m)
- Speed: 48 mph (77 km/h)
- Inversions: 0
- Duration: 1:15
- Height restriction: 48 in (122 cm)
- Trains: 2 trains with 7 cars; riders arranged 2 across in a single row for a total of 14 riders per train
- Wildcat at RCDB

Wildcat is a wooden roller coaster located at Lake Compounce in Bristol, Connecticut. It was built in 1927 and is the 14th oldest operating roller coaster in the world. It greatly resembles the now-defunct Wildcat roller coaster at Elitch Gardens Theme Park in Denver. Wildcat has received the American Coaster Enthusiasts (ACE) Coaster Landmark Award for its historical significance.

== History ==
Wildcat is a double out-and-back wooden coaster designed by Herbert Paul Schmeck and built by the Philadelphia Toboggan Company (PTC) in 1927. Before Wildcat was built, the Green Dragon coaster stood on the same land. In 1926, park owners Pierce and Norton contracted PTC for a new ride to replace the park's aging Green Dragon coaster. With the help of Schmeck, they created Wildcat. Wildcat features a twister-style layout including elements such as airtime and tunnels. Wildcat's original trains were built by PTC. The entire structure was rebuilt with new wood in 1985, and the last bunny hills were retracked in 2004. Wildcat underwent refurbishment beginning on September 17, 2006, and reopened for the 2007 operating season. During its refurbishment, the brake runs were completely removed and rebuilt with new magnetic brakes. The station also received air gates in the queue line and individual seat belts were added to each seat. In 2017, the ride received a full retracking by Martin & Vleminckx. The ride also received two new Millennium Flyer Trains made by Great Coasters International. Wildcat did not operate for the 2023 season, and reopened in 2024 after undergoing a full retracking from The Gravity Group.

== Timeline ==
- 1927: Opened to the public.
- 1985: Reconstructed with new wood.
- 1998: Fully retracked.
- 2004: Final bunny hill run retracked, seat dividers installed.
- 2007: Magnetic brakes installed to allow for two train operation, air gates added to station, individual seat belts installed, most of the track repainted, and blue train repainted purple.
- 2014: Lift motor maintenance.
- 2012–2018: Fully retracked, lift hill partially rebuilt, and two new Great Coasters International Millennium Flyer Trains added
- 2023–2024: Fully retracked

== Ride experience ==
Wildcat sits in the center of Lake Compounce. Wildcat utilizes its design to twist around itself. Once the train leaves the station, the train turns slightly right, then left, before climbing the 85-foot lift hill and dropping 78 feet. The lift hill is adjacent to the park entrance. The initial drop is followed by a left-banked curve and into a few more smaller hills until then reaching a right-banked curved leading into several more small hills. The train then curves right onto a section of bunny hills where it continues until it reaches the tunnel which contains the brake run.
