= Giant Drop (Six Flags Great America) =

Amusement ride in Illinois, US

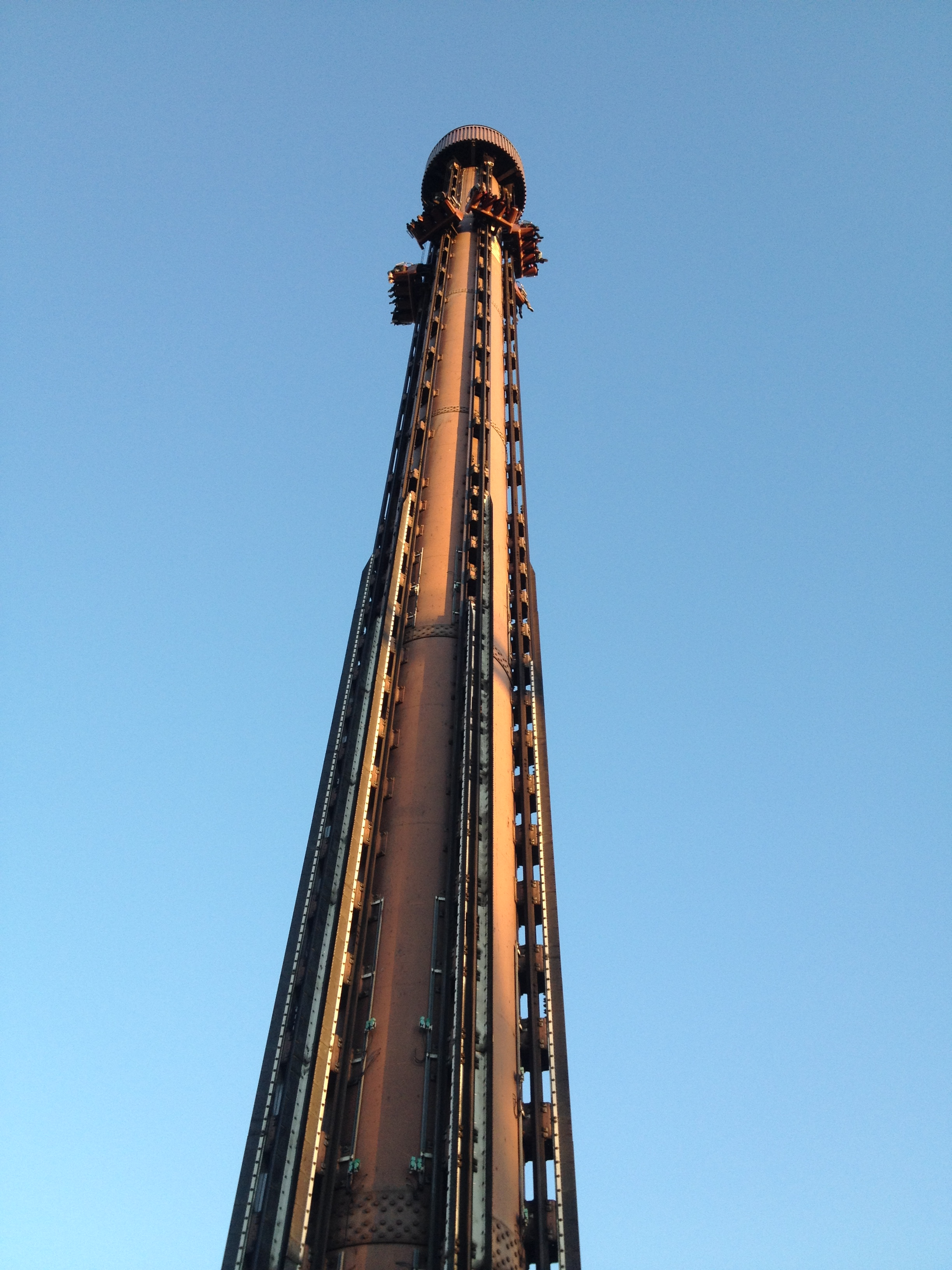

Six Flags Great America
- Area: Southwest Territory
- Coordinates: 42°21′56.4″N 87°56′10.7″W
- Status: Operating
- Opening date: April 26, 1997
- Fast Lane available
- Single rider line available

Ride statistics
- Attraction type: Drop tower
- Manufacturer: Intamin
- Model: Giant Drop
- Theme: Mining excavator
- Height: 227 ft (69 m)
- Drop: 205 ft (62 m)
- Speed: 62 mph (100 km/h)
- Vehicles: 6
- Riders per vehicle: 4
- Duration: 0:30

Giant Drop is a drop tower ride located at Six Flags Great America in Gurnee, Illinois, United States. Manufactured by Intamin, the ride opened to the public on April 26, 1997, as part of a three-phase plan for the park's Southwest Territory area. At a height of 227 ft (69 m), the ride is the second tallest attraction at Six Flags Great America, behind Sky Trek Tower at 330 ft (100 m).

Set in the Loco Diablo Mine, the ride is themed as an ore excavator built by the fictional Southwest Mining Company. The ride received a temporary re-theme in 2017 under the name Drop of Doom featuring virtual reality headsets in partnership with Samsung.

== History ==
=== Development and construction ===
As part of a three-phase plan for the Southwest Territory themed area, the ride was the second phase of the area, following the first, the opening of Southwest Territory, which opened in 1996.

Plans to construct the ride were approved by the Gurnee Village Board on October 8, 1996, despite resident opposition, citing concerns that the new attraction would create "intolerable" noise throughout the village, as homes were located close to Washington Street, near where the attraction would be constructed. That same month, groundbreaking on the attraction had begun, and in December 1996, the ride was finalized, with cranes used in the construction process to hoist 35.5 ton motor houses to the top of the ride.

=== Opening ===
On April 26, 1997, the ride officially opened to the public alongside Dare Devil Dive. As part of the opening ceremony for the attraction, 144 couples from around the Midwest gathered at the park for a mass ceremony inside the Southwest Territory Amphitheater, before going on the attraction and being pronounced man and wife. After the pronouncement, a voice over the public address system was heard saying "You may now take the ultimate plunge," as couples were dropped down the attraction.

=== After opening ===
Seat belts were added to Giant Drop in August 1999 after the death of a young passenger on Drop Zone: Stunt Tower at California's Great America, then known as Paramount's Great America.

After an accident in June 2007 at Six Flags Kentucky Kingdom where a teenager had both feet cut off on Superman: Tower of Power, all Intamin drop towers at Six Flags and Cedar Fair theme parks were shut down temporarily as a safety precaution, including Giant Drop. After a partnership with Six Flags and Samsung, Giant Drop featured virtual reality headsets and was re-themed to Drop of Doom temporarily for the 2017 season. The premise of Drop of Doom was riders controlling a futuristic spaceship while escaping spiders.

== Characteristics ==
=== Theme ===
The attraction is themed on the abandoned "Loco Diablo Mine," which as stated on the entrance sign, is owned, built and designed by the "Southwest Mining Company," as the ride itself is an "ore excavator." Throughout the queue line, guests enter through elaborately themed rocky canyons and abandoned mining facilities before guests reach the Giant Drop, the "ore excavator."

== Ride experience ==
After riders go through the queue experience, riders enter one of the ride's six cars. Ascending towards a height of 227 ft (69 m), the ride then descends 205 ft (62 m), traveling at a speed of 62 mph (100 km/h). Frictionless magnetic brakes stop the ride, giving it a "smooth landing."

== Reception ==
Monica Eng of the Chicago Tribune described the attraction in a chart style, describing it as "lasting a lifetime," and would recommend the ride to her "worst enemy." The magnetic brakes were described as feeling like "landing on a humongous pillow."
