= Boulder Dash (roller coaster) =

Roller coaster at Lake Compounce

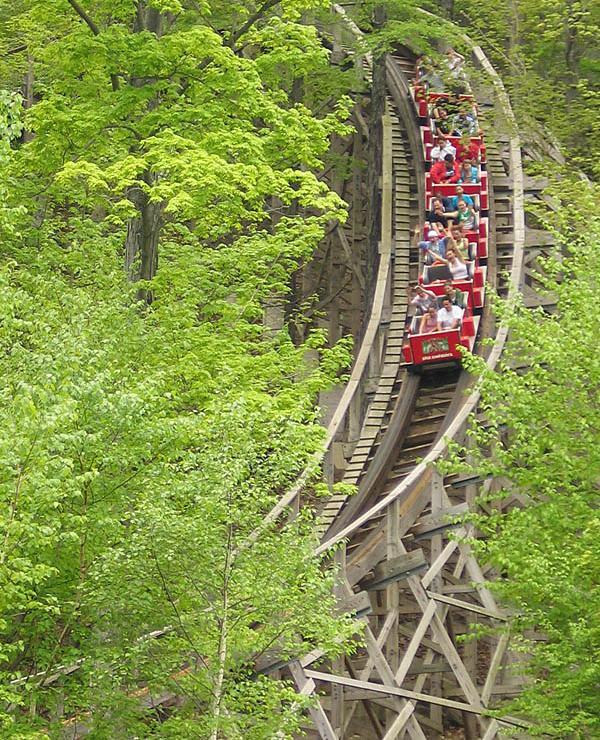
- The ride in 2006

Lake Compounce
- Location: Lake Compounce
- Coordinates: 41.639187°N 72.924540°W
- Status: Operating
- Opening date: May 21, 2000
- Cost: US$6,000,000

General statistics
- Type: Wood
- Manufacturer: Custom Coasters International
- Designer: Dennis McNulty; Larry Bill
- Track layout: Terrain
- Lift/launch system: Chain lift hill
- Height: 110 ft (34 m)
- Drop: 115 ft (35 m)
- Length: 4,725 ft (1,440 m)
- Speed: 60 mph (97 km/h)
- Duration: 2:30
- Max vertical angle: 59°
- Height restriction: 48 in (122 cm)
- Trains: 2 trains with 6 cars; riders arranged 2 across in 2 rows for a total of 24 riders per train
- Boulder Dash at RCDB

Boulder Dash is a hybrid wooden roller coaster located at Lake Compounce in Bristol, Connecticut. The coaster was built by Custom Coasters International using Southern yellow pine wood, while the track is made of Douglas Fir. Amusement Today's annual Golden Ticket Awards ranked Boulder Dash as the world's best wooden roller coaster in 2004 and from 2013 to 2016.

== History ==
Construction for the coaster began in June 1999 and was completed in May 2000. The ride cost $6 million and was built into the side of a mountain at Lake Compounce. In the four years prior to the ride's opening, Lake Compounce's owners had spent $40 million on improving the park. The opening of Boulder Dash helped increase attendance at Lake Compounce, which had suffered from declining attendance in prior years.

During the 2007 off-season, about 80 percent of the ride was retracked, and some of the supports replaced, as part of a $3 million renovation. In addition, the end of the ride, which had an intentionally uneven track, was rebuilt. Lake Compounce bought PTC trains from Hersheypark's Wildcat for the 2008 season. For the 2017 season, Boulder Dash was retracked by Martin & Vleminckx to help smooth out rough patches and replace rotting wood. The retracking also removed the triple-up hill located near the end of the ride, replacing it with a double-up hill. For the 2023 season, 580 feet of the track was replaced with steel Titan Track by Great Coasters International and Skyline Attractions. For the 2024 season, an additional 280 feet of track was replaced. Before the 2025 season, more than 200 feet of Titan Track was added to the unbanked right turn before the halfway turnaround. Prior to the 2026 season, another 535 feet of track was replaced. This section continued from the 2023 addition at the start of the ride until right before the first double-up.

== Characteristics ==
The 4,672-foot (1,424 m) wooden roller coaster uses Lake Compounce's natural mountainous terrain, complete with trees and boulders within close proximity of the track. It is the longest wooden coaster on the East coast at 4,725 feet.

The lift hill climbs the mountainside and disappears from view. When it reappears, it has completed its first drop of 115 feet and is traveling sixty miles per hour as it crosses over itself and flies over the station. Much of the first half of the ride is hidden as the train climbs and drops along the mountainside. On the last drop, on-ride photos are taken and can be viewed and bought at the photo booth at the end of the exit line.

Boulder Dash features two six-car trains manufactured by Philadelphia Toboggan Coasters (PTC). Each car has two rows, and each row seats two riders, for a total of 24 riders per cycle. One of the trains is painted green and the other is painted blue. Both feature the ride's logo on the front of the lead car.

== 2001 incident ==
Boulder Dash accident
- Date: June 13, 2001
- Deaths: 1
- Injuries: 0

On June 13, 2001, a 23-year-old worker was killed after being struck by one of the coaster's trains. Occupational Safety and Health Administration (OSHA) officials subsequently visited Lake Compounce and found several safety violations, fining the park $29,000. In November 2001, this fine was halved as part of a settlement between the park and OSHA. The worker's family sued Lake Compounce in 2002 over the accident.

== Awards and rankings ==
Boulder Dash was voted the world's top wooden roller coaster in 2001 by the National Amusement Park Historical Association. In addition, from 2001 to 2023, the ride was one of the top five wooden roller coasters as ranked by Amusement Today's Golden Ticket Awards. The 2004 Golden Ticket Awards was the first in which Boulder Dash was the top-ranked wooden coaster.

Golden Ticket Awards: Top wood Roller Coasters
Year									1998	1999
Ranking									–	–
Year	2000	2001	2002	2003	2004	2005	2006	2007	2008	2009
Ranking	12	3	3	3	1	2	3	4	5	2
Year	2010	2011	2012	2013	2014	2015	2016	2017	2018	2019
Ranking	4	4	5	1	1	1	1	3	4	4
Year	2020	2021	2022	2023	2024	2025	2026			
Ranking	N/A	4	4	5	7	8	10			

NAPHA Survey: Favorite Wood Roller Coaster
Year	2005
Ranking	2 (tie) (Note: Tied with The Beast)
