= Lake Compounce =

Amusement park in Bristol, Connecticut

- Previously known as Lake Compounce (1846–1985), Hershey Lake Compounce (1986–1987), Lake Compounce Festival Park (1988–1995)

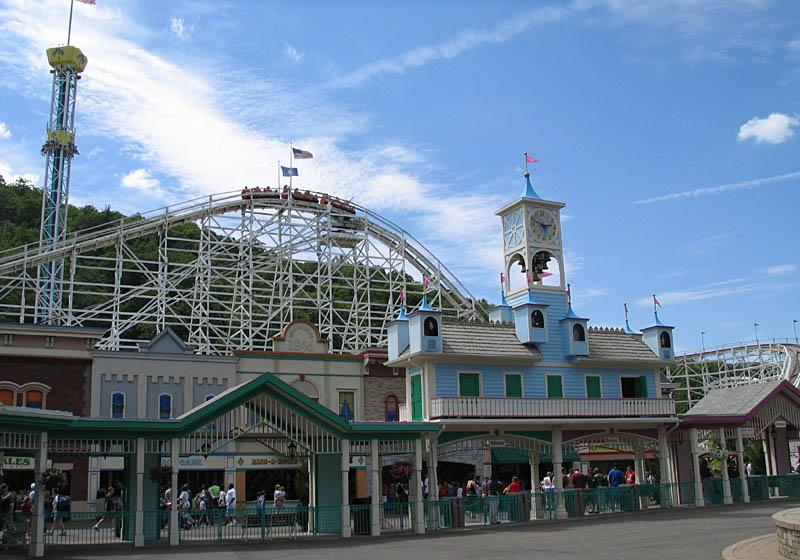
- The main gate of Lake Compounce
- Interactive map of Lake Compounce
- Location: 185 Enterprise Drive, Bristol, Connecticut, United States
- Coordinates: 41°38′30″N 72°55′24″W
- Status: Operating
- Opened: 1846; 180 years ago
- Owner: Herschend
- Slogan: "New England's family theme park!"
- Operating season: May through October
- Area: 332 acres (134 ha)

Attractions
- Total: 44
- Roller coasters: 5
- Water rides: 13
- Website: www.lakecompounce.com

Lake Compounce is an amusement park located in Bristol and Southington, Connecticut that opened in 1846. It is the oldest continuously operating amusement park in the United States.

It spans 332 acres (134 ha), which includes a beach and a water park called Crocodile Cove, both included in the price of admission. In addition to housing the 14th oldest wooden roller coaster in the world, Wildcat, its newer wooden roller coaster, Boulder Dash, won the Golden Ticket Award for Best Wooden Coaster for five consecutive years. The park is owned by Herschend.

== History ==
The lake's name is derived from Chief John Compound, a Mattatuck-Tunxis Native American. On December 3, 1684, his tribe signed a deed that left Compound's Lake to a group of white settlers, including John Norton, who had migrated to central Connecticut from Massachusetts. The property was left to the settlers in exchange for a small amount of money and miscellaneous items, including a large brass tea kettle.

=== Early days ===
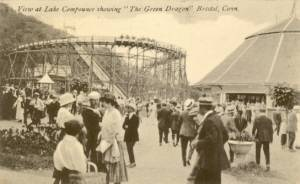
Green Dragon roller coaster

The park's history goes back to 1846, when Gad Norton hired a scientist to perform an experiment using explosives, which failed. The experiment brought large crowds, which inspired Norton to open an amusement park. His park had public swimming and rowing on the lake, a gazebo for lakeside band concerts, and several rides. The park saw success as a picnic park through the post–American Civil War era.

In 1851, a California Gold Rush 49er named Isaac Pierce joined Norton to establish a firm. The two men petitioned local legislators and asked that their residences be ceded from the town of Southington to the town of Bristol. In 1895, a casino was built on the property, which was the first permanent building at the site. Later that year, the Bristol and Plainville Tramway Company constructed the Southington and Compounce trolley line. Shortly after, Lake Compounce purchased the Lake Compounce Carousel for $10,000. The Carousel is included in the National Register of Historic Places.

In 1914, Lake Compounce opened Green Dragon, the park's first electric-powered roller coaster. The coaster was torn down in 1927 to make room for Wildcat, a wooden coaster designed by Herbert Schmeck and built by the Philadelphia Toboggan Company.

The early 1930s brought more growth to the park. The casino was expanded with the addition of a dance floor. An all-time attendance record of 5,000 people was set in the spring of 1941, when Tommy Dorsey's reorganized band featured Frank Sinatra, who had yet to reach the height of his career.

The effects of the Great Depression and the growing usage of the automobile brought trolleys in the United States into a decline, which negatively impacted attendance at Lake Compounce. These same factors had similar effects on other parks in the New England region, such as Canobie Lake Park and Riverside Park. In 1944, Lake Compounce opened a steam railroad. It was designed and built by Connecticut actor William Gillette, the original actor of Sherlock Holmes in silent films.

=== New ownership ===
The park's success was stable until the late 1960s, when attendance began to decline. Lake Compounce remained under the ownership of the Pierce and Norton Corporation until 1966, when Edward G. Pierce sold his share to the Norton family. The Nortons owned and operated the park through 1985 and were able to restore some profitability and raise attendance. No major attractions were added during this time, and the Nortons listed the park for sale in 1984. In 1985, Lake Compounce was sold to the Hershey Entertainment and Resorts Company, owners of Hersheypark in Hershey, Pennsylvania, who briefly renamed the park to "Hershey's Lake Compounce". Factors such as poor marketing, low attendance, and repeated ride outages caused Hershey to sell the park after two seasons in 1987, a decision that upset local representatives.

In the spring of 1987, Joseph Entertainment Group (JEG), owned by Joseph Balestieri, bought the park and renamed it "Lake Compounce Festival Park". The park received renovations, and in 1988 a 20,000-seat outdoor amphitheater was added. One of the first notable musical acts to perform at the new venue was the group Milli Vanilli, and their live performance was broadcast on MTV in what was later recognized as the first public sign that they were lip-syncing. JEG focused more of their attention on concert promotion and neglected the amusement park portion of the property. The Wildcat roller coaster and other rides were nonoperational by 1991. That year, JEG's financial troubles were exposed when a check the company wrote to Guns N' Roses bounced, and the performance was cancelled. It was later discovered that JEG was nearly $900,000 behind in taxes and had not refunded nearly $300,000 to ticket-holders for 15 cancelled concerts.

At the end of the 1991 season, Joseph Entertainment Group filed Chapter 11 bankruptcy and did not open the park for the 1992 season. The park was put up for sale at a very low price. After being unable to find a buyer, JEG filed for Chapter 7 bankruptcy protection and liquidated the park. The land and what was left of the rides and buildings were sold to Stephen Barberino. The park remained closed for the 1992 and 1993 seasons. In 1993, Funtime Parks, owner of Geauga Lake Park and Darien Lake Park, among other parks, became Barberino's management partner. The existing rides were repaired, several new rides were added, and waterslides were constructed on the beach and lake areas. The park reopened for the 1994 season. That year, Funtime merged with Premier Parks, which later became Six Flags. Premier Parks and Barberino then put Lake Compounce up for sale again in 1995. Companies including Cedar Fair, Alpha Smartparks, and the Kennywood Entertainment Company made offers.

=== Kennywood Entertainment Corporation and Parques Reunidos ===
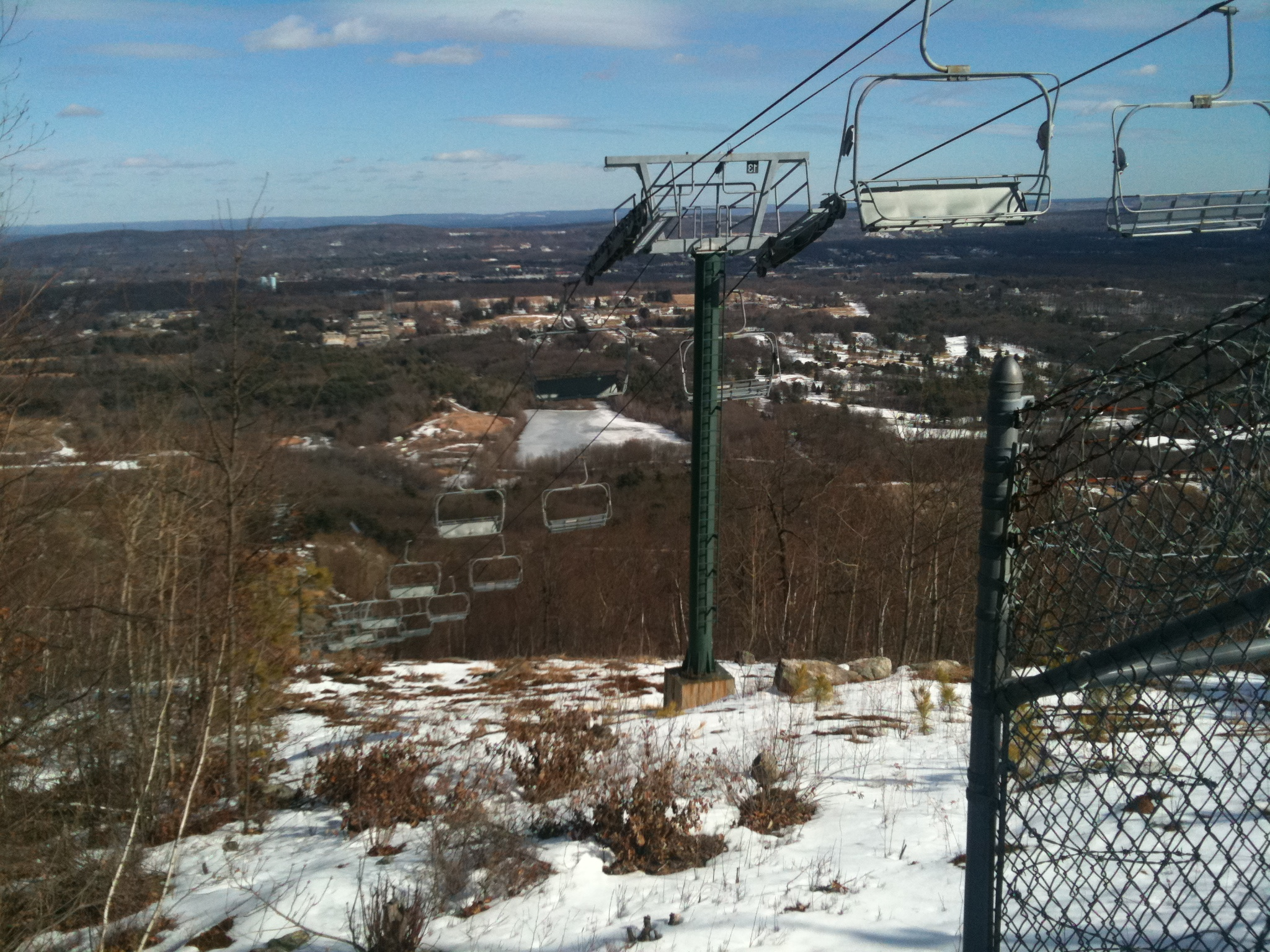
Lake Compounce SkyRide chair lifts from the Tunxis Trail Compounce Ridge side trail in 2010.

Early in 1996, Kennywood Entertainment Company, owners of Pittsburgh's Kennywood amusement park, signed an agreement to purchase Lake Compounce. That year the park added several new rides and a Boomerang roller coaster. The park prospered as a family amusement park, rather than a thrill park. In 2000, the roller coaster Boulder Dash was opened, and later received the 2004 Golden Ticket Award for the #1 Wood Roller Coaster from Amusement Today. In late 2007, Kennywood Entertainment Company sold its parks to the Spain-based Parques Reunidos company.

More recent plans have included a significant expansion of the Crocodile Cove water park. This has required the moving of nearby Mount Vernon Road to the north to allow the park more room for expansion. The road move was expected to cost $6 million, while the additions to the water park were expected to cost $15 million. In 2013, the park added the Bayou Bay wave pool. In 2014, the park added an off-site campground called Bear Creek Campground with cabins, tent and RV spaces, and a main lodge. The campground was renamed to Lake Compounce Campground in 2021 during park's 175th season.

In 2016, the park added a new roller coaster called Phobia Phear Coaster, a Sky Rocket II model from Premier Rides. Phobia Phear Coaster features three linear synchronous motor (LSM) launches and a heartline roll at 150 feet (46 m) high. General Manager Jerry Brick stated that the coaster was the biggest investment in the park's history.

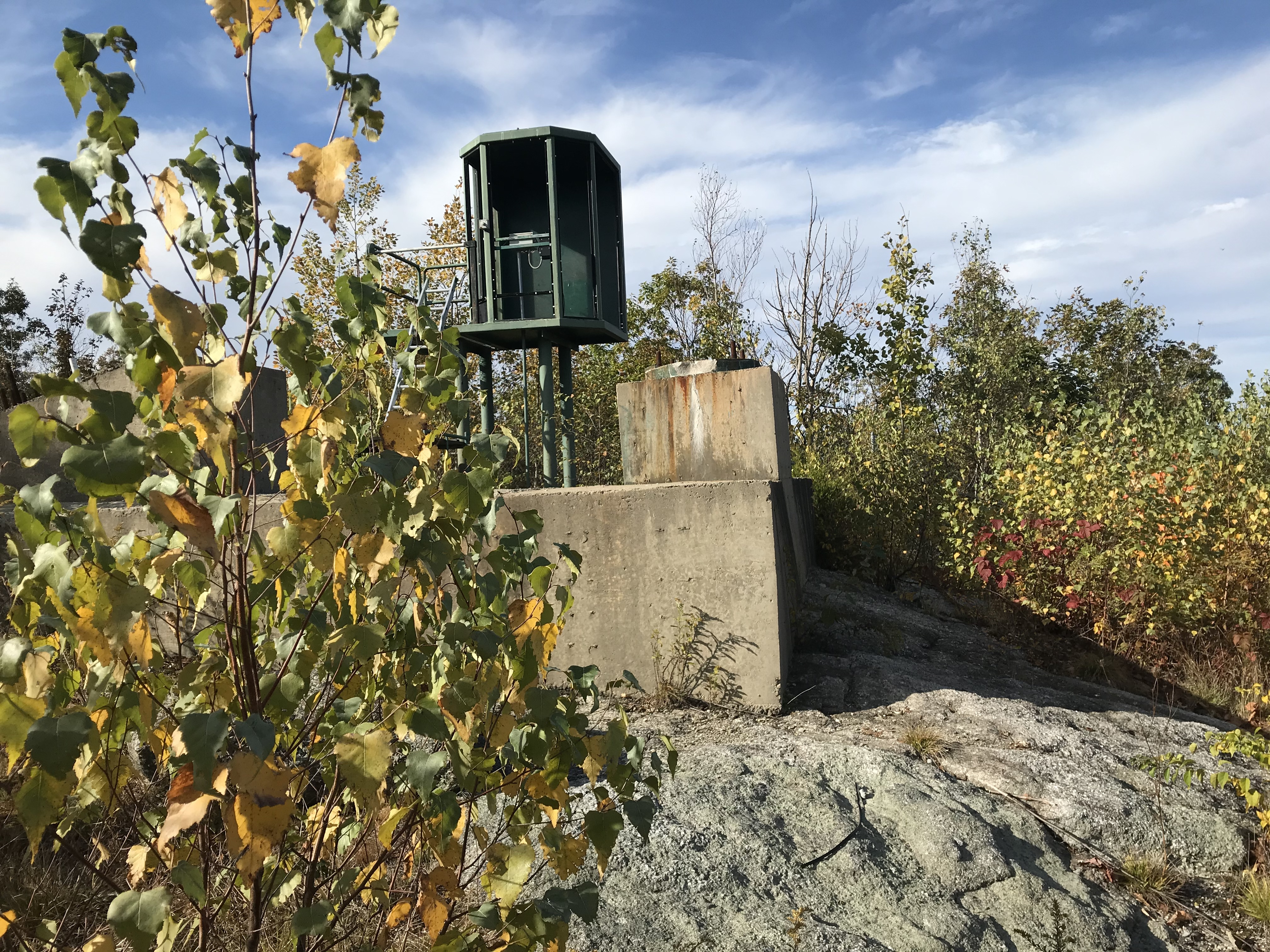
Decommissioned Lake Compounce chair lift on Tunxis Trail in 2019.

In early July 2017, Lake Compounce shut down Sky Ride—a twenty-five minute round trip chairlift from the park up to the top of the Southington Mountain ridge. The non-ski chairlift was one of the rides brought to the park by Kennywood Entertainment in 1997. The decommissioning came after a chairlift accident at Six Flags Great Escape on June 24, 2017. The remote and inaccessible nature of the lift's path and terminus on top of Southington Mountain were cited by Brick as reasons for the closing.

Both the bumper cars and the trolley ride were removed for the 2024 season.

=== Acquisition by Herschend ===
On March 18, 2025, it was announced that Lake Compounce had been purchased by Herschend, alongside several other American Parques Reunidos-owned parks.

== Events ==
During October, the park runs a Halloween event called Phantom Fall Fest. Rides still operate during the event, and when the sun goes down, scare actors roam the park and four haunted houses open. Before sunset, there are no scare actors or haunted houses, allowing for children to enjoy the park scare-free.

During December, the park holds a Christmas event called Holiday Lights. A selection of children's and family rides are available, as well as a place to meet Santa. The event also features a 100-foot-tall Christmas tree, the largest in Connecticut. In August 2025, the Hartford Courant reported that after 175 years, Lake Compounce's Holiday Lights event would come to an end following the 2025 season.

== Former events ==
The park's former Halloween event was known as The Haunted Graveyard. Many of the park's rides were operated after dark, and a haunted house called The Haunted Graveyard operated as well. The attraction consisted of a 45-minute walk-through of catacombs, castles, special effects, and graveyards. The Haunted Graveyard started in 1991 and relocated to Lake Compounce in 2001, returning every year until its final year in 2020. Portions of the proceeds were donated towards the American Diabetes Association and the Juvenile Diabetes Research Foundation.

== Attractions ==
Ride name	Picture	Opening year	Manufacturer	Description
Roller coasters
Boulder Dash	Boulder Dash	2000	Custom Coasters International	First wooden coaster to be built on the side of a mountain. The track length is 4,725-foot (1,440 m) long with a 115-foot (35 m) first drop.
Kiddie Coaster	Kiddie Coaster	1997	Molina & Sons	A children's roller coaster with an oval-shaped track. The train consists of five cars with two children or one adult and one child per car.
Phobia Phear Coaster	Phobia Phear Coaster	2016	Premier Rides	Sky Rocket II model roller coaster. Features an inline twist, a non-inverting loop, three LSM launches, and a top speed of 62 mph (100 km/h).
Wildcat	Wildcat Coaster	1927	Philadelphia Toboggan Company	A historic wooden roller coaster. 14th oldest operating roller coaster in the world and recipient of an ACE Coaster Landmark Award.
Zoomerang	Zoomerang	1997	Vekoma	A Boomerang shuttle coaster from Vekoma with a 125-foot (38 m) drop, a cobra roll, and a vertical loop.
Amusement rides
American Flyers		1997	Rocco Amusements	A Flying Scooters ride that previously resided at several different amusement parks, including Kennywood, before being relocated to Lake Compounce in 1997.
Carousel	Carousel	1911	Looff/Murphy	A carousel that was built in 1898 and moved to Lake Compounce in 1911. One of the oldest operating carousels in the US. A Wurlitzer #153 band organ once provided the carousel's music. However, due to the difficulty of repairing such an organ, the park uses it sparsely.
Compounce Railway		1997	Chance Rides	A rideable miniature train that runs along the east side of the lake with two stations.
Down Time		2004	S&S Power	A drop tower ride that drops riders 185 feet (56 m) up to 60 mph (97 km/h).
Ferris Wheel		1997	Chance	A Ferris wheel.
Ghost Hunt	Ghosthunt	1999	Sally Corporation	A dark ride experience where riders shoot laser guns at targets to score points.
Pirate Ship		1986	HUSS	Classic swinging pirate ship ride.
Rev-O-Lution		2011	Zamperla	A Disk'O flat ride that spins 360 degrees on a half-pipe-shaped track.
Saw Mill Plunge	Saw Mill Plunge	1987	Arrow Dynamics	A classic log flume ride.
Sky Coaster		1998	Skycoaster Inc.	A Skycoaster amusement ride that swings riders in a pendulum motion.
Thunder N' Lightning	Thunder N Lightning	2006	S&S Power	A Screamin' Swing ride where two giant arms swing riders up to 60 mph (97 km/h) producing up to 3 Gs.
Thunder Rapids	Thunder Rapids	1997	Hopkins	A classic river rapids ride.
Twister		2000	Wisdom Industries Ltd.	A Tornado ride where riders are able to spin their own gondolas while the entire platform rotates and tilts.
Wave Swinger	Wave Swinger	1986	Zierer	A Wave Swinger flat ride that tilts as riders swing in a circular motion.
Zoomer's Gas N' Go	Zoomer's Gas N' Go	2007	Morgan	A 1950s car-themed attraction for children.
Children's rides
Drop Zone		2004	Moser	A 40-foot (12 m) drop tower. Riders are lifted 36-foot (11 m) in the air and then bounced to the bottom. There are four different drop sequences.
Drum Circus		1997	Sartori	Each ride seat is a drum that spins individually while the entire ride spins clockwise. The drums are fixed to arms which raise and lower automatically.
Kiddie Carousel		1997	Morgan	A miniature carousel. Some figures are animated while others are stationary.
Flying Elephants		1997	Sartori	The ride rotates in a clockwise direction and has six arms, each with an elephant attached. The arms rise when the rider pulls the control stick towards theirself, and the elephant descends when the control stick is pushed away.
Kiddie Swinger		1985	Dietz	Consists of 16 swings suspended from chains on a rotating center.
Little Critters		1999	I. E. Park	Small scale bumper cars which seat up to two riders.
Little Daredevils		1985	Hampton	Small-scale motorcycles which rotate in a counter-clockwise direction.
Rainbow Riders		2007	SBF Visa	Consists of eight hot-air balloon themed baskets suspended from a center carriage which rotates and raises 25-foot (7.6 m).
Crocodile Cove rides
Croc-O-Nile		2005	ProSlide Technology	Lazy river that also includes a waterslide.
Bayou Bay		2013	N/A	Wave pool.
Anchor Bay		1998	N/A	Soak zone.
Clipper Cove	Clipper Cove	2003	N/A	Soak zone.
Compounce Cabana Boat		2007	N/A	Pontoon.
Keeper's Cottage		1998	N/A	Soak zone.
Mammoth Falls		2001	ProSlide Technology	Enclosed raft slide.
Riptide Racer		2012	ProSlide Technology	Matt racer slide.
Tunnel Twisters		2009	N/A	Body slide.
Wave Pool		1998	N/A	Wave pool.
Venus Vortex		2021	WhiteWater West	Raft slide.
Storm Surge	Lights Out	1998	N/A	Waterslide. Closed in 2019. Reopened in 2022 after a refurbishment and added SFX and VFX.

=== Former attractions ===
Ride name	Type	Year opened	Year closed	Service years	Description	Replaced by
Roller coasters
Green Dragon	Roller coaster	1914	1926	12	Wooden roller coaster that was replaced by Wildcat.	Wildcat
Roll in the Dark	Enclosed roller coaster	1979	1982	3	Enclosed roller coaster.	N/A
Amusement rides
The Sky Ride	Chairlift	1997	2017	20	A 25-minute chairlift ride that took riders to the top of Southington Mountain and back.	N/A
Bumper Cars		1997	2023	26	Classic bumper cars ride.	Arcade games in former building
Enterprise	Enterprise	1986	2015	29	An Enterprise amusement ride model that consisted of 20 gondolas arranged in a circle that spin at nearly a right angle to the ground. Manufactured by HUSS.	Phobia Phear Coaster
Musik Express	Music Express	1985	2008	23	A Mack Music Express.	Wipeout
Rotor	Rotor	1997	2010	13	A cylindrical spinning ride where centrifugal force pinned riders to the wall.	Rev-O-Lution
Top Spin	Top Spin	1997	2002	5	A HUSS Top Spin. Relocated to Kennywood in 2003 and renamed King Kahuna.	American Flyers
Tornado	Scrambler	1975	1999	24	Indoor Scrambler ride.	Twister
The Trolley		1997	2023	26	A 4 ft 8 1/2 in (1,435 mm) standard gauge open-air trolley ride utilizing the historic Connecticut Company #1414 trolley car, built in 1911.	N/A
Wipeout	Wipeout	2009	2020	12	Chance Rides Wipeout.	An entertainment stage
Children's rides
Arctic Express	Kiddie ride	1997	2015	18	Miniature version of Musik Express.	Jolly Jester
Caterpillar Train	Kiddie ride	1997	2020	24	Caterpillar-themed powered train ride from Zamperla. Consisted of a powered first car and four non-powered carts.	N/A
Jolly Jester	Kiddie ride	2009	2023	14	A smaller version of Pirate Ship, where a motor below the ship turns a drive wheel that allows the boat to move back and forth in the direction of the spinning tire.	N/A
Water rides
Lake Plunge	Tube slide	1999	2011	12	Two enclosed tube slides. It emptied into the lake.	Riptide Racer
Twister Sisters	Body slide	1985	2007	22	Three enclosed twisting body slides.	Tunnel Twisters
Other
Miniature Golf Course	Miniature golf course	1959	2004	45	18 miniature golf holes.	Anchor Bay
Amphitheater	Stage	1988	1997	9	20,000 seat outdoor amphitheater. Home to concerts for many big-name bands.	Zoomerang
Paddle Boats	Paddle boats	1985	2005	20	Rental paddle boats.	Compounce Cabana Boat
Swan Boats	Paddle boats	2005	2007	2	Rental paddle boats themed as swans.	Compounce Cabana Boat
Mark Twain	Paddle boat	1999	2007	8	Flat-bottom paddle boat that transported guests across the lake. Themed as a classic steam boat.	Compounce Cabana Boat
Gillette Railway	Miniature railway	1943	1997	54	Train designed by William Gillette. Was borrowed from and later returned to Gillette Castle State Park.	C.P. Huntington Train
Dino Expedition	Walk-through attraction	2015	2023	8	Short walk-through of a jungle-themed area. Featured multiple dinosaur animatronics, as well as a children's dig site.	Kyle's Garden

== Incidents ==
- On July 19, 1981, a 16-year-old girl died falling from the Wildcat coaster after attempting to stand up during a ride cycle.
- On August 4, 1986, several riders were injured after two train engines on the Gilette Railway collided at a switching station. Four people were taken to Bristol Hospital for treatment, while one was treated at the park's first aid center. Investigators determined that the accident was caused by operator error. The ride resumed operation that evening with only one train engine running, allowing the other to be repaired.
- On July 31, 1997, 27 people were stranded on the Zoomerang coaster for an hour and a half after its emergency system stopped the train. All were evacuated and no injuries were reported.
- On August 20, 1999, a 16-year-old park employee was knocked over and crushed by the Tornado ride. The employee died from his injuries 10 hours later.
- On July 1, 2000, a six-year-old boy riding the Lake Plunge water slide fell into the lake when the tube he was using overturned. The boy was found unconscious after a twenty-minute search and died six days later as a result of the injuries. In response, Lake Compounce introduced stricter safety precautions regarding the water slide and made life jackets a requirement for children.
- On June 13, 2001, a train on the Boulder Dash coaster was sent on a preliminary test run when it struck and killed a 23-year-old groundskeeper who had been cutting weeds by the side of the ride.
- On June 14, 2001, a train stopped on Zoomerang's cobra roll with 28 people aboard after it somehow continued running on the track while its automatic braking system malfunctioned. There were no injuries and all riders were safely evacuated by firefighters. The ride was shut down for inspection and park officials later determined the incident was caused by a safety sensor malfunction.
- On May 16, 2004, a five-year-old boy was killed when he was struck by a fallen tree branch from a decaying 80-foot red oak tree that hung above the park's miniature golf course.
