= Lake Compounce Carousel =

- U.S. National Register of Historic Places
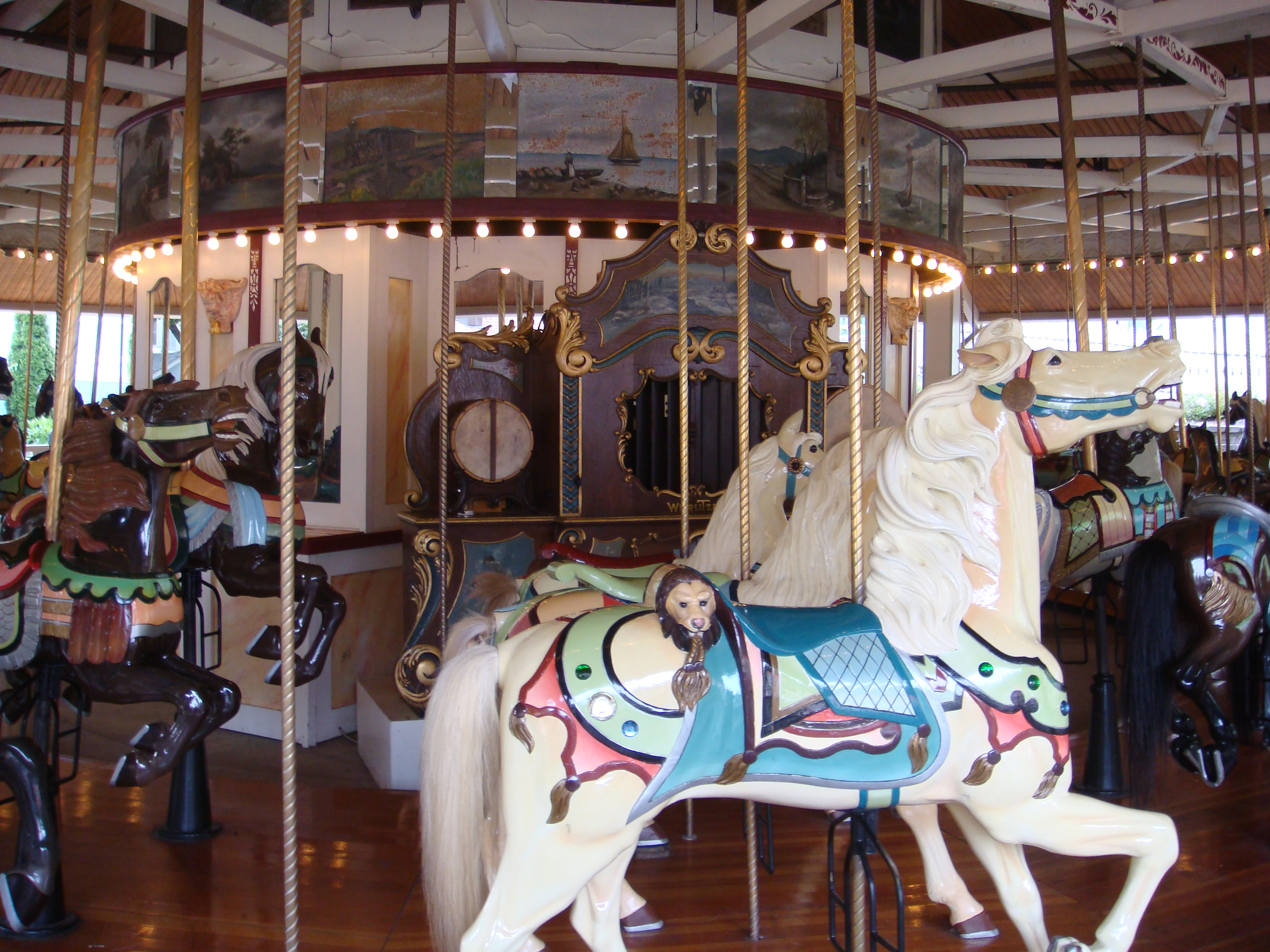

- Location within Connecticut Location within the United States
- Location: Lake Compounce Amusement Park, Southington, Connecticut
- Coordinates: 41°38′21″N 72°55′22″W
- Area: Less than one acre
- Built: 1890
- Architect: Looff; et al
- NRHP reference No.: 78002865
- Added to NRHP: December 12, 1978

Lake Compounce Carousel is a historic carousel at Lake Compounce amusement park in Southington, Connecticut. It was designed by Charles I. D. Looff and built around 1890. A rare surviving operational Looff carousel, it was added to the National Register of Historic Places in 1978.

== Description and history ==
Lake Compounce Carousel is located on the southern portion of the amusement park grounds, separated from the northern shore of Lake Compounce by a water slide and the Starlight Theater. The carousel is housed in a 12-sided wooden structure topped by a scallop-shingled roof with a monitor center and a central cupola. The roof is supported by wooden posts set on piers, with balustrades between the piers. The carousel has a platform 45 feet (14 m) in diameter, with 18 rows of riding positions. 16 of these positions consist of horse figures, three abreast. Of the other two, two of the three positions are taken up by a stationary chariot, and in one of those, the third position is occupied by a goat. The horses are each uniquely painted, and are set in a variety of poses and facial expressions. The decorative elements of the platform assembly are original.

The carousel was built around 1890 at the Charles Looff factory in Riverside, Rhode Island. It was originally located at Savin Rock Amusement Park in West Haven, Connecticut, and was moved to Lake Compounce in 1911. At that time it was also modified by Tim Murphy to include a recently designed mechanism for making the horses go up and down.

== See also ==
- Amusement rides on the National Register of Historic Places
- National Register of Historic Places listings in Southington, Connecticut
