= Green Dragon (Lake Compounce) =

Former roller coaster in Bristol, Connecticut

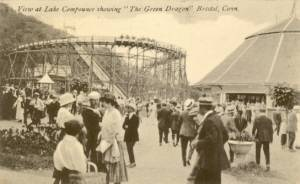

Lake Compounce
- Location: Lake Compounce
- Coordinates: 41.642°N 72.923°W
- Status: Removed
- Opening date: 1914
- Closing date: 1926
- Replaced by: Wildcat

General statistics
- Type: Wood – Out and back
- Designer: Bowen, Moore
- Lift/launch system: Chain
- Inversions: 0
- Green Dragon at RCDB

Green Dragon was a wooden roller coaster located at Lake Compounce in Bristol, Connecticut. It opened in 1914, and operated for 13 years. It was the first electrically powered roller coaster at the nation's oldest continuously operating amusement park.

Green Dragon was demolished in 1927 to make way for Wildcat.
