= Alpine Bobsled =

Former roller coaster at Six Flags Great Escape and Hurricane Harbor

- Previously known as Sarajevo Bobsled at Six Flags Great Adventure (1984–1988); Rolling Thunder at Six Flags Great America (1989–1997)
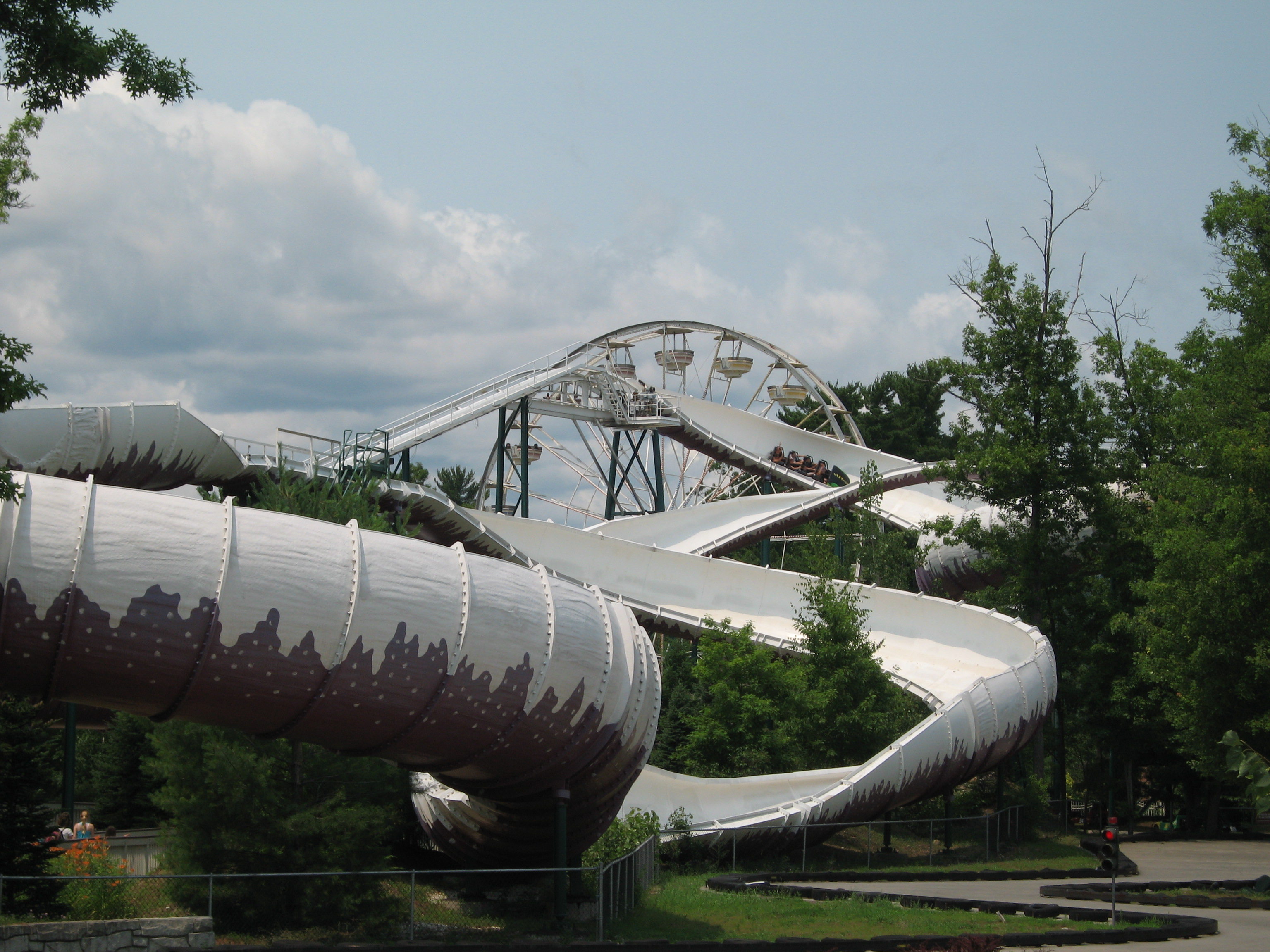

Six Flags Great Escape and Hurricane Harbor
- Park section: Fest Area
- Coordinates: 43.3511°N 73.6877°W
- Status: Removed
- Opening date: 1998
- Closing date: September 4, 2023
- Replaced by: The Bobcat
- Alpine Bobsled at Six Flags Great Escape and Hurricane Harbor at RCDB

Six Flags Great America
- Coordinates: 42.3658°N 87.937°W
- Status: Removed
- Opening date: 1989
- Closing date: 1997
- Replaced by: Raging Bull
- Alpine Bobsled at Six Flags Great America at RCDB

Six Flags Great Adventure
- Coordinates: 40.139°N 74.4381°W
- Status: Removed
- Opening date: 1984
- Closing date: 1988
- Replaced by: Great American Scream Machine
- Alpine Bobsled at Six Flags Great Adventure at RCDB

General statistics
- Type: Steel
- Manufacturer: Intamin
- Model: Bobsled roller coaster
- Height: 64 ft (20 m)
- Length: 1,490 ft (450 m)
- Speed: 35 mph (56 km/h)
- Inversions: 0
- Duration: 1:40
- Height restriction: 42 in (107 cm)
- Trains: 6 trains with a single car; riders arranged 2 across in 4 rows for a total of 8 riders per train

Alpine Bobsled (formerly known as Sarajevo Bobsled and Rolling Thunder) was a steel bobsled roller coaster at Six Flags Great Escape and Hurricane Harbor amusement park in Queensbury, New York. Manufactured by Intamin and Giovanola, the roller coaster first opened to the public in 1984 at Six Flags Great Adventure. It was later relocated to Six Flags Great America in 1989, then to Six Flags Great Escape in 1998. Alpine Bobsled closed permanently on September 4, 2023, to make room for The Bobcat.

== History ==
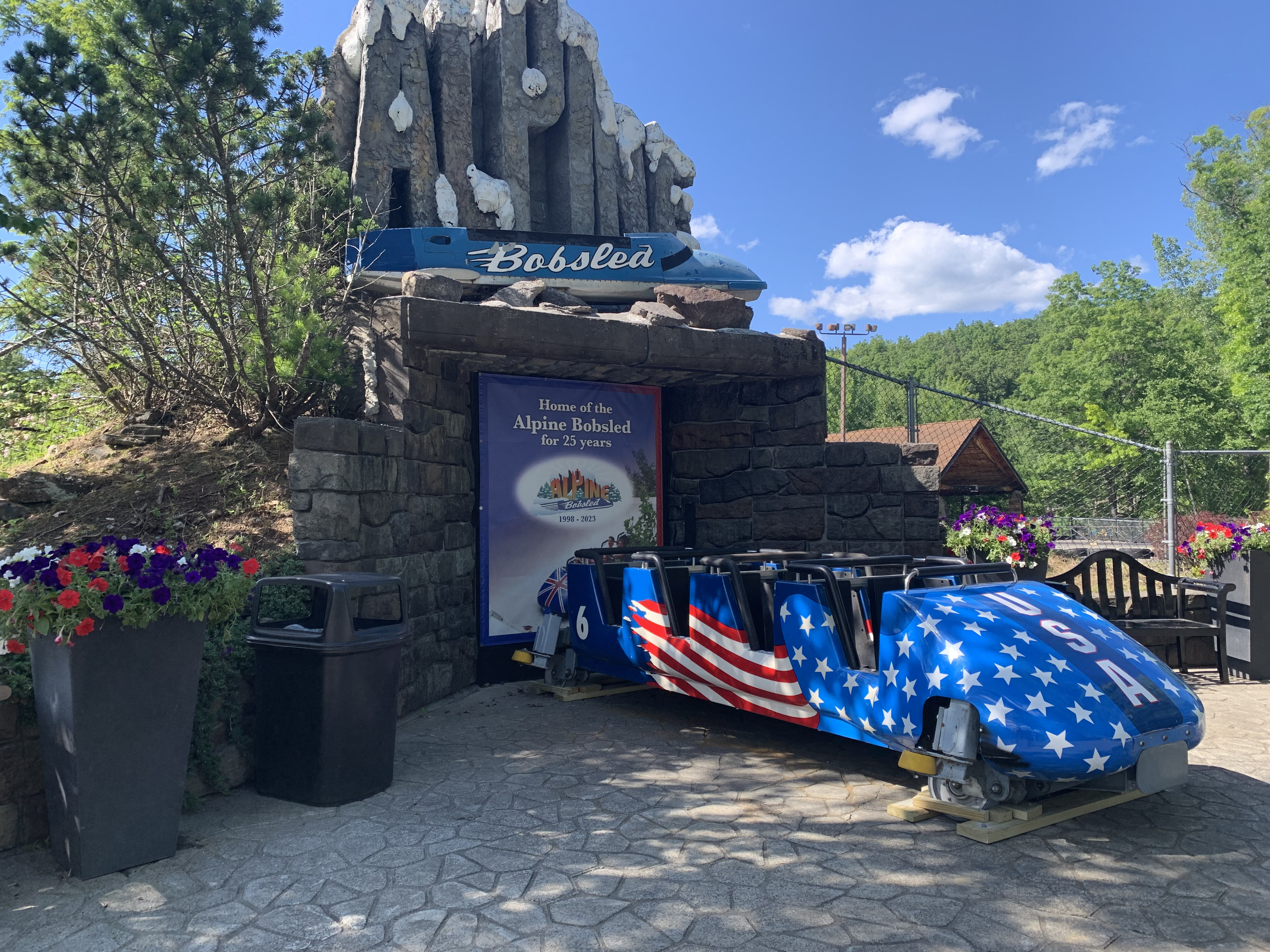
Alpine Bobsled car and entrance on display at Six Flags Great Escape

The coaster was originally built in 1984 as Sarajevo Bobsled at Six Flags Great Adventure to commemorate the 1984 Olympics. The coaster was well received by the public.

Sarajevo Bobsled was part of Six Flags' ride rotation program, and was moved between parks multiple times. In 1988, Sarajevo Bobsled was dismantled to make room for Great American Scream Machine, which would open the next year. Sarajevo Bobsled was moved to Six Flags Great America for the 1989 season, where it reopened as Rolling Thunder.

In 1995, the ride was dismantled once more to make way for the construction of the Southwest Territory themed area. The ride remained in storage until 1997, when it was relocated for a final time to Six Flags Great Escape and Hurricane Harbor, where it would reopen in 1998.

In August 2023, the park announced Alpine Bobsled would close on September 4, 2023, citing the ride's sensitivity to "small amounts of rain and high humidity". The park later revealed that Alpine Bobsled was being dismantled to make room for The Bobcat, a new roller coaster that would debut in 2024. On September 4, 2023, members of the American Coaster Enthusiasts gathered at the park to take their final rides on the Alpine Bobsled, which closed for good at the end of the day. Following its removal, a monument to the coaster displaying one of the ride's cars was placed where its queue entrance was previously.

== Characteristics ==
Alpine Bobsled featured 1,490 feet (450 m) of steel track, painted white on the inside and white and purple on the outside. The coaster reached a maximum height of 64 feet (20 m) and top speeds of 35 miles per hour (56 km/h). After ascending a chain lift hill, the trains traversed a series of turns on trough-like track throughout the ride, which lasted approximately one minute and 40 seconds.

The alpine theme of the coaster was inspired by the park's close proximity to Lake Placid, New York, where the 1980 and 1932 Winter Olympics, both of which included bobsled races, were held. The ride had six single-car trains, all themed to different countries, including the United Kingdom, the United States, Italy, Jamaica, Canada, and Switzerland.
