= Paint roller =

Paint application tool

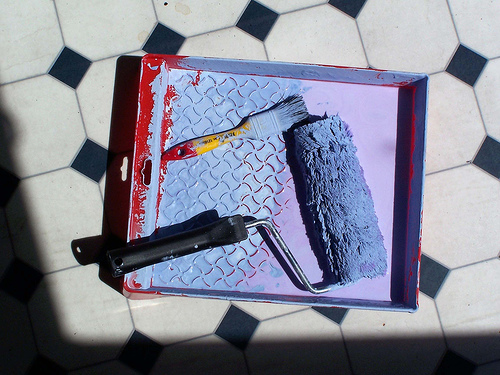
A paint roller

A paint roller is a paint application tool used for painting large flat surfaces rapidly and efficiently.

The paint roller typically consists of two parts: a "roller frame," and a "roller cover." The roller cover absorbs the paint and transfers it to the painted surface, the roller frame attaches to the roller cover. A painter holds the roller by the handle section. The roller frame is reusable.

The roller cover is a cylindrical core with a pile fabric covering secured to the cylindrical core. The thickness of the fiber on the roller cover is referred to as "nap." Rollers with thinner nap are typically used for smoother surfaces and to achieve smoother paint texture. Thicker nap is most often used when painting rougher textured materials, like masonry, or when more texture is desired in the finished paint surface.Foam rubber rollers are also produced.

Both foam and fabric roller covers that can be purchased without a frame, to replace worn out roller covers; once the old cover is removed, the new one can be fitted onto the roller frame for use. It is possible to clean and reuse a roller cover, but it is also typically disposed of after use.

An innovation of the cylindrical core has allowed it to contain paint inside, with the cover absorbing paint from the inside and filtering it through (naturally by wicking) to the cover's exterior when the roller is rolled, and thence onto the surface being painted.

== History ==
=== Norman James Breakey ===
In Canada, Norman James Breakey invented a paint roller in 1940, had it patented in Canada, and produced it in a home factory. After WW II, he sold at least 50,000 of the paint rollers under the name Koton Kotor and it was also sold as the TECO roller by Eaton's.

=== Richard Croxton Adams ===
In the United States, Richard Croxton Adams produced a paint roller in a basement workshop in 1940 and patented it in the United States. The patent application was filed in 1942. However, a similar paint roller patent application was filed in the United States two years earlier in 1940 by inventor Fride E. Dahlstrom.
