= Twister roller coaster =

Roller coaster with turns and crossovers

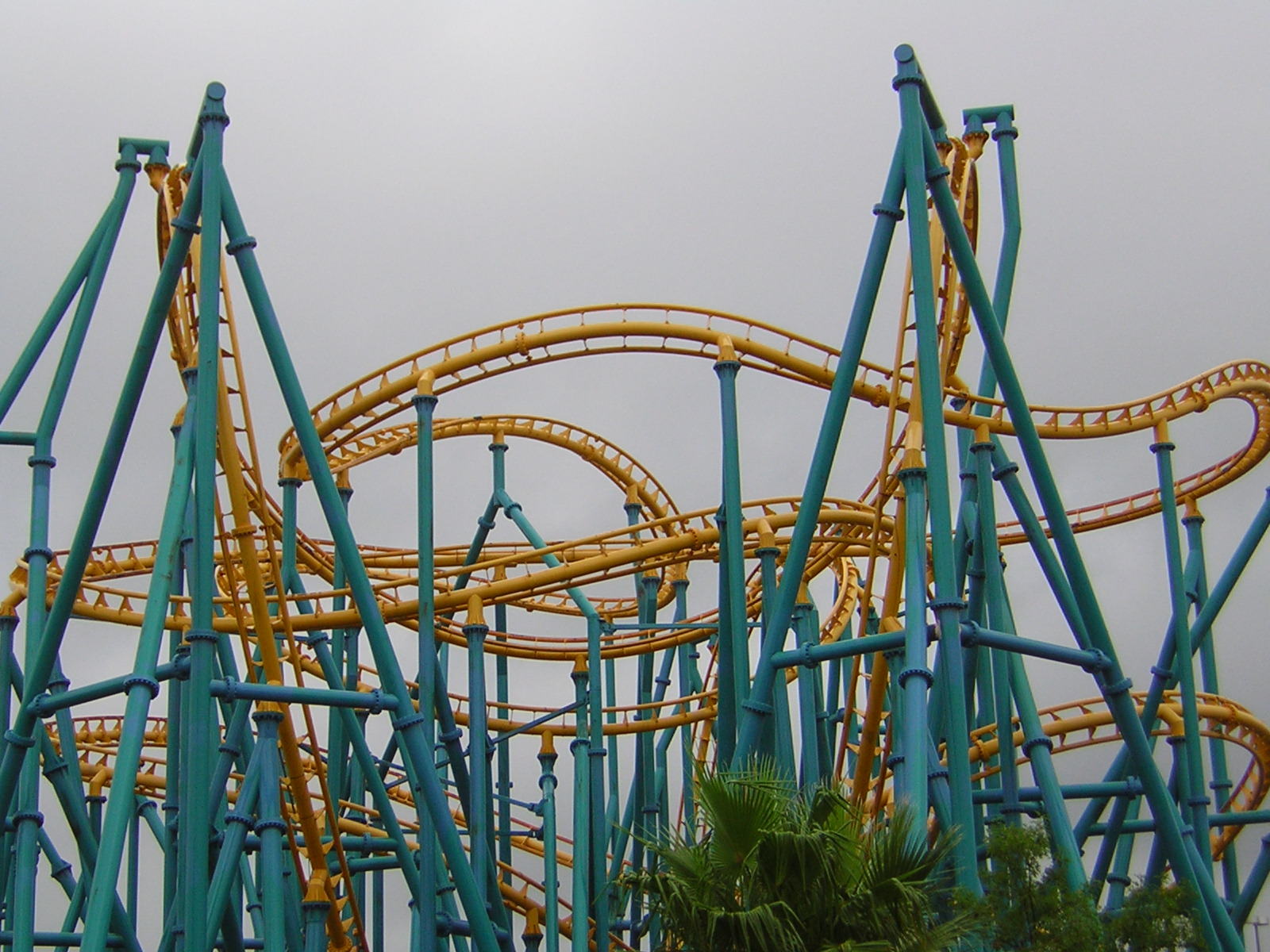
Poltergeist at Six Flags Fiesta Texas in San Antonio, Texas

A twister roller coaster is a roller coaster with a layout featuring many turns and multiple crossovers with itself. It is essentially the opposite of an out and back roller coaster, which is often a much simpler layout. Twister roller coasters often have the illusion of having small or tight clearances due to the track usually travelling through several support structures. This is known as a headchopper effect.

Twister roller coasters were unheard of before the 1920s. John Miller is credited with inventing up-stop wheels and secure lap bar restraints, both which led roller coaster designers to create more extravagant and intertwined layouts.

An example of the difference between an out and back design and twister design is layouts of Apollo's Chariot and Raging Bull, two Bolliger & Mabillard designed hypercoaster roller coasters that debuted in 1999. Apollo's Chariot uses a traditional out and back layout while Raging Bull is a twister.
