= Cattle town =

Type of frontier settlement in American history

A cattle town was a frontier settlement in the Midwestern United States that catered to the cattle industry. The economies of these communities were heavily dependent on the seasonal cattle drives from Texas, which brought the cowboys and the cattle that these towns relied upon. Cattle towns were found at the junctions of railroads and livestock trails. These towns were the destination of the cattle drives, the place where the cattle would be bought and shipped off to urban meatpackers, midwestern cattle feeders, or to ranchers on the central or northern plains. Cattle towns were made famous by popular accounts of rowdy cowboys and outlaws who were kept under control by local lawmen, but those depictions were mostly exaggeration and myth.

== Cattle towns ==
=== Kansas ===
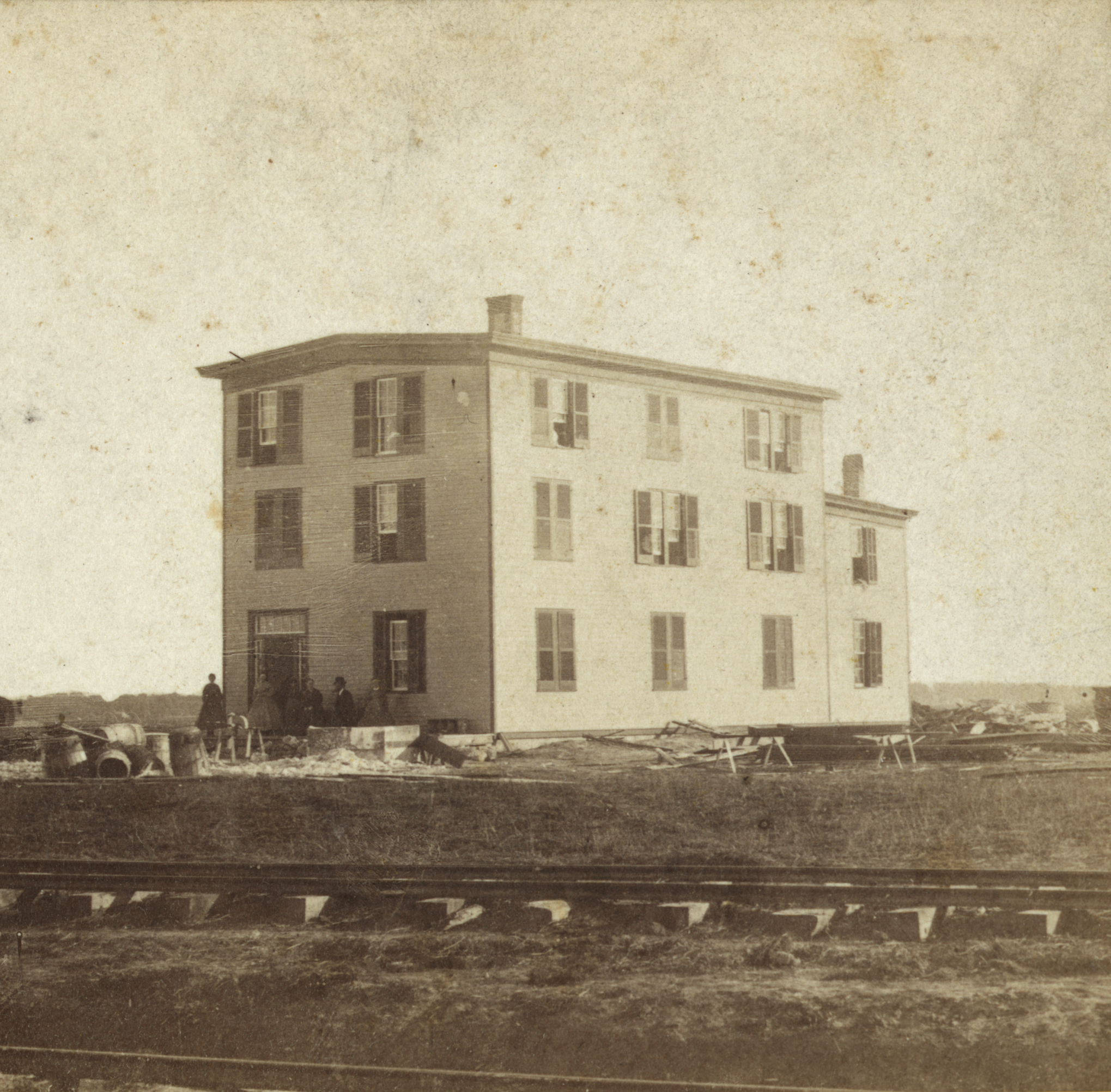
Joseph McCoy's Drover's Hotel, McCoy's Stock Yard, Abilene, Kansas, 1867

The first cattle town was Abilene, which was made into a market for Texan cattle in 1867. The town of Abilene was a prosperous cattle market until farmers took all of its outlying ranges, which completely severed Abilene's link to the trail. Ellsworth, Newton, and Wichita replaced Abilene as the major cattle towns in 1872. These three towns found themselves on rival railroads and competed for the cattle trade. In 1875 the three of them Ellsworth, Newton and Wichita lost access to the cattle trails because of expansive rural settlement around the towns. Dodge City became the major cattle town in 1876, and Caldwell joined it in 1880, but both towns were closed to the cattle trade in 1885 when Kansas outlawed the importation of Texan cattle.

=== Nebraska ===
As many Texan cattle drivers became dissatisfied with the Kansas Pacific Railroad, they began to look to the lower prices of the Union Pacific. Additionally the influx of settlers, farmers and ranchers onto what used to be the cattle trails in Kansas and Nebraska forced old towns to be abandoned and new ones to be founded.

The first cattle town in Nebraska was Schuyler in 1870, but settlers flooded into the area, forcing the cattle drivers to find a new marketplace. The next town in Nebraska was Kearney, but just like in Schuyler, the settling of the surrounding lands blocked it off from the cattle trail. Ogallala finally took its place as the cowboy capital of Nebraska in 1873. It was known as a fairly rough and tumble town, as many of the cattle towns were, and saw 17 violent deaths during the peak of the cattle boom.

=== Cheyenne, Wyoming ===
Cheyenne, with its easy access to the railroad, became the center of the Wyoming cattle trade. It differed from the usual cattle towns in that it was also a social and cultural center, known for its opera house, Atlas Theatre, Cheyenne Club, Inter-Ocean Hotel, and large number of businesses and mansions. Some of its best known residents were Buffalo Bill Cody and Calamity Jane. Unlike other cattle towns Cheyenne had a diverse economy and did not rely solely on the cattle trade, which allowed it to prosper though the off season and recover from economic fluctuations.

=== Miles City, Montana ===
Miles City was also a stopping point on the cattle drives from Texas, a place to fatten the herd before market. In 1881 the Northern Pacific Railroad extended its line through the city, and in 1884 the Montana Stockgrowers Association was formed there making it a leading cattle market.

=== Medora, North Dakota ===
Medora was long the center of the cattle trade in North Dakota. Local ranchers brought their cattle to the Medora stock yards. The Medora Grazing Association helped to maintain the industry. In addition to the local ranchers, many other ranchers from all over North Dakota would drive their cattle to Medora for shipment.

== Cowboys ==
Cowboys filled an interesting role in cattle town politics. On the one hand they were typically seen as the source of the vice that the Victorian moralist movement sought to remove from their communities. On the other, the cattle towns themselves were supported by the industries of vice in which the cowboys partook while they spent the offseason there. Thus the "respectable" inhabitants of the cattle towns had to endure the rowdiness of the cowboys because they were what allowed the towns to survive economically. This would remain the case until farmers took up all the land surrounding the cattle towns, which allowed them to survive without the profits of the cattle trade.

Though the "respectable" townsfolk could not change or remove the cowboys, whom they depended upon, they were able to impose restrictions upon the businesses that they frequented. In Abilene, for example, a Red Light District emerged in 1868. Saloons and brothels were open all day and night, frustrating the decent townsfolk to no end. At the time the Topeka Commonwealth wrote, "Hell is now in session in Abilene." Abilene's Red Light District stood north of town, but Mayor Joseph McCoy moved it to the east. Of the businesses moved, most were the brothels that the decent citizens hated so fervently. The town segregated the new district from the rest of town, allowing them to distance themselves from the immoral behavior of the cowboys. This new district became known as McCoy's addition or the Devil's Half-Acre.

In contrast, the actual profession of the cowboys was seen by many people as cheerful, lively, and pleasant, at least to the regular townsfolk and onlookers, though in reality being a cowboy was thankless and grueling work. They had to go months on end with only the company of other cowboys and their cattle. This led many to believe that cowboys were hard workers who chose a tough career path because that is what they wanted. These virtues, that of hard work and pleasant dispositions contrasted with their inclination to indulge in drinking, gambling and prostitution. Many people formed an ambiguous mythological ideal of the cowboys, that included the virtues of hard work, which was an American ideal, and that mingled with the vices that they liked to indulge in.

== Conflict ==
Many people who lived within and surrounding the cattle towns were opposed to the cattle drives. These critics were of two main groups, the farmers and the townspeople themselves. As agriculture spread from the cattle towns into outlying ranges the cattle trails were cut off, and the cowboys would have to steer their herd through the fields and pastures of the farmers. The latter feared the trampling of their crops as well as an influx of Texas fever. Texas fever is a disease spread by ticks that live on the Texas Longhorn cattle. The Longhorns have a natural immunity to it, but it is nearly 100% fatal among other breeds of livestock. The townspeople themselves also took issue with the cattle drives. They opposed the growing number of saloons, gambling, and prostitution that catered to the cowboys that came into town with the cattle.

=== Victorian movement ===
In the early days of the cattle towns, the leaders were among the "sporting class," a group of saloon owners, gamblers, entertainers, providers of services, prostitutes and lawmen. In the beginning it was the saloon owners who ran the cattle towns, as their establishments were at the center of town and brought in a good deal of money. Over time however leadership of these communities fell into the hands of the "respectable class," which included merchants, stockmen, professionals, craftsmen, farmers, and domestic servants. Both groups thought of tasks like fighting fires, getting water, removing sewage and funding schools as private affairs rather than falling to the public domain.

This shift in the leadership to a more respectable group of people was further perpetuated by the influx of eastern Victorian culture to the frontier cattle towns. This development was, in large part, catalyzed by the movement of women to these frontier settlements. Women provided a stabilizing effect on communities, creating roots in the form of families that encouraged eastern Victorian virtues and eclipsed the cattle towns' rough and tumble cowboy ways of old.

== Myths ==
Cattle towns are remembered as some of the most dangerous places on earth, where outlaws, lawmen, and cowboys shot it out and slugged it out day by day. In fact this was not at all the case. Cattle towns had lower rates of homicide than eastern cities. Towns like Wichita were slandered by non-cattle towns like Topeka, who stated that Wichita was a place of murder, riots, and racism. They even went so far as to say that Wichita was infested with the Ku Klux Klan. Wichita responded to these accusations, noting that there were no murders in Wichita and that the city was orderly and civilized. As stated in the local newspaper, the Wichita Eagle, the citizens of Wichita drank less, brawled less, gambled less, and harbored fewer "scandalous" women than the city of Topeka. These conflicting statements prove that even at the time myth and rumor were more prevalent than the truth, which is that for the most part cattle towns were rowdier than ordinary cities but were not the hotbed of crime and violence that many claimed.
