= Sky Trek Tower =

Observation tower in Gurnee, Illinois

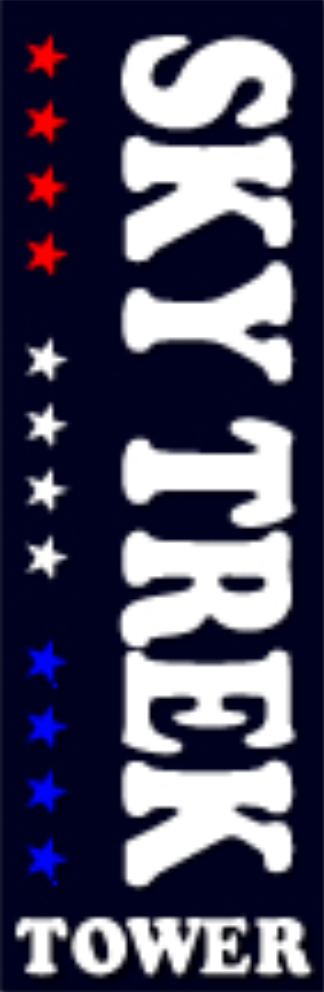

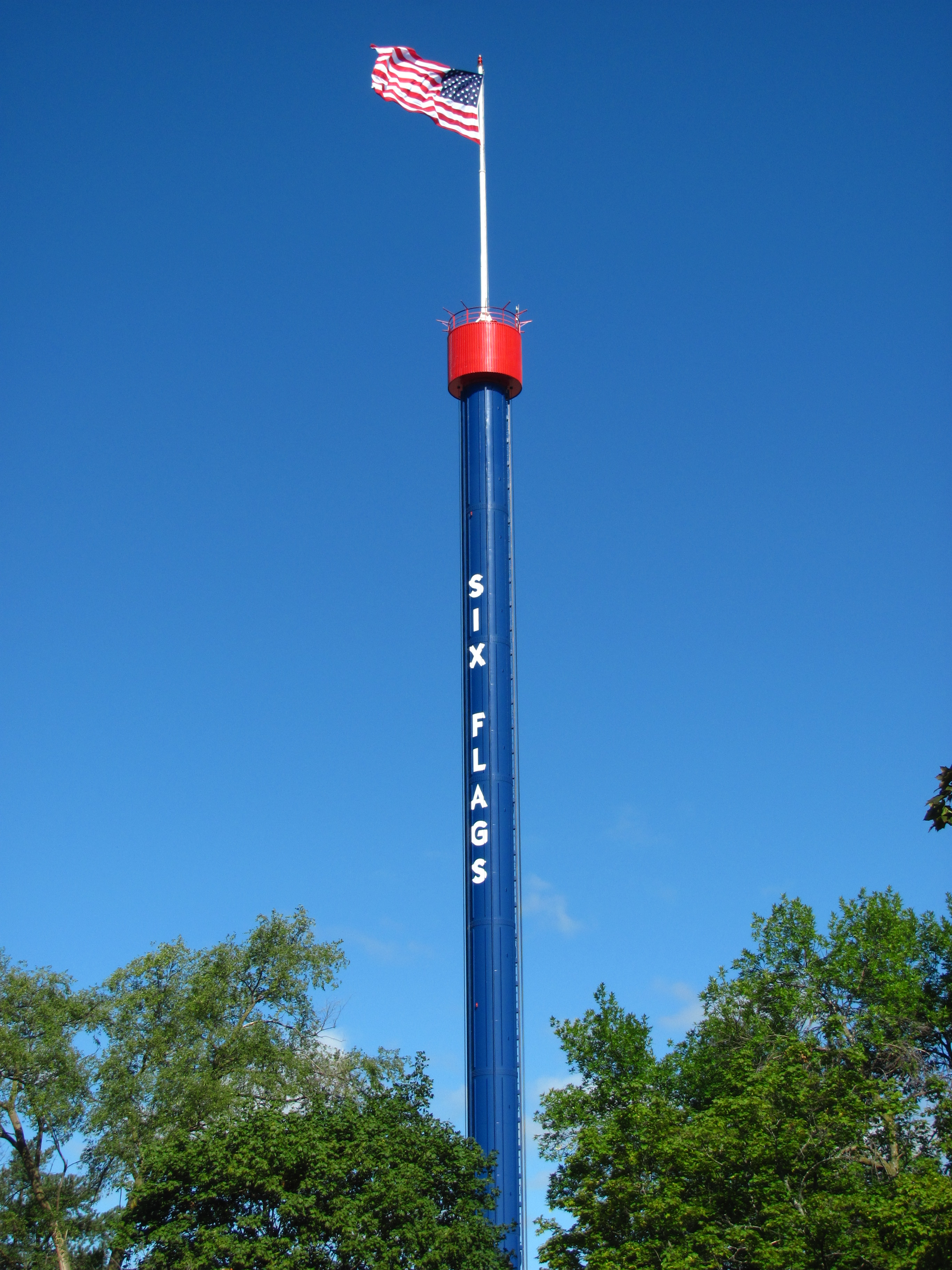

Six Flags Great America
- Area: Carousel Plaza
- Coordinates: 42.3694°N 87.9361°W
- Status: Operating
- Opening date: June 28, 1977

Ride statistics
- Attraction type: Observation tower
- Manufacturer: Intamin
- Model: Gyro Tower 1200
- Height: 330 ft (100 m)

Sky Trek Tower is a 330-foot (100 m) tall gyro tower located at Six Flags Great America in Gurnee, Illinois, United States. Manufactured by Intamin, the attraction is the tallest ride at Six Flags Great America and the tallest free-standing structure in Lake County, Illinois. Opening on June 28, 1977, the ride was part of an expansion program by the Marriott Corporation following the opening of their Great America parks the year prior. From 2019 to 2023, the ride was closed to the public.

== History ==
After the opening of Marriott's Great America in 1976, the Marriott Corporation decided to build an Intamin gyro tower model at the theme park as part of an expansion program for the 1977 season. After fabrication in Germany, the attraction was carried by ship to the United States. With an expected opening of late-May 1977, the attraction's tip was built at a height of 330 feet (100 m) while the architectural height was 285 feet (87 m).

After construction on the attraction, the ride officially opened to the public on June 28, 1977, as the tallest free-standing structure in Lake County, Illinois. Additionally, it was the first attraction located at the park to exceed the height variance imposed by the village of Gurnee, Illinois, which had a variance of 125 feet (38 m). A photograph of the construction of the attraction by Chicago Tribune photographer Luigi Mendocino won the Chicago Builders' Association's photography competition on December 13, 1977.

Marriott Corporation would later open a ride of the same model called the "Sky Tower" for the 1979 season at the Marriott's Great America theme park in Santa Clara, California (now California's Great America). The height of that attraction was shortened to 200 feet (61 m) due to the proximity of the San Jose International Airport.

The attraction was repainted in 2009 by Baynum Painting from its original white color to blue with the words "Six Flags" on the side of the tower. From 2019, the ride was closed, remaining in that status in the following years due to the COVID-19 pandemic. The ride reopened to guests on May 27, 2023.

== Ride experience ==
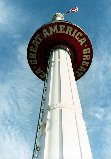
The attraction was originally painted white.

The cabin rises up 285 feet (87 m) to the ride's architectural peak and back down. During the ride, facts about the history of Six Flags Great America are given. On clear days, the Chicago skyline can be seen from the ride.

== Incidents ==
On June 22, 2015, the cabin stopped abruptly, trapping riders for over two hours before they were released through an emergency staircase. The park clarified that the ride did not drop at high speeds. A year later, on September 22, 2016, an employee was immobilized by a back ache while erecting an inflatable gorilla for the park's Halloween event Six Flags Fright Fest. He was rescued by the Gurnee Fire Department.

== See also ==
- Gyro tower
