= Great Coasters International =

Pennsylvania-based roller coaster manufacturer

- Industry: Manufacturing
- Founded: 1994
- Headquarters: Sunbury, Pennsylvania, U.S.
- Area served: Worldwide
- Products: Wooden roller coasters
- Website: greatcoasters.com

Great Coasters International, Inc. (GCI or GCII) is a Sunbury, Pennsylvania-based roller coaster manufacturer which has created several award-winning rides since its formation in 1994. Starting in 2006 with Thunderbird at PowerPark in Finland, the company expanded beyond the United States and began building coasters in Europe and Asia. Günter Engelhardt GmbH handles the company's marketing rights in Europe. In addition to building new roller coasters, GCI also refurbishes and re-tracks existing roller coasters, regardless of manufacturer.

Since its founding in 2014, American company Skyline Attractions has provided its design and engineering services to GCI and now designs and engineers all of GCI's roller coasters. The coasters are known for their often curved drops, twisted layouts, and perception of high speed. Exciting elements such as the station fly-by and station fly-through have been incorporated in many of their layouts.

== History ==
GCI was founded in 1994 by Mike Boodley and Clair Hain, Jr. Boodley was a coaster designer previously with Custom Coasters International and Hain had gained a reputation throughout the industry as a master coaster builder. In 1996, the firm opened Wildcat at Hersheypark which contained many of the signature elements the firm would soon become known for: tight sweeping curves, reminiscent of designs from the turn of the century by such noted coaster designers as Fred Church and Harry Traver. In 2005, Boodley retired and assigned Jeff Pike with the responsibility as lead designer for the firm. The first coaster that Pike is credited with is the Kentucky Rumbler at Beech Bend Park near Bowling Green, Kentucky.

Though GCI is capable of re-tracking roller coasters, they have not conducted many re-tracking projects. One of their most notable re-trackings was in 2016 for GhostRider at Knott's Berry Farm.

In November 2019 at an after party during the IAAPA convention, the company revealed a steel track prototype. The track is designed and engineered by Skyline Attractions and was later named Titan Track. The first installation of the track was a test section on White Lightning at Fun Spot America in September 2020.

== Millennium Flyer trains ==
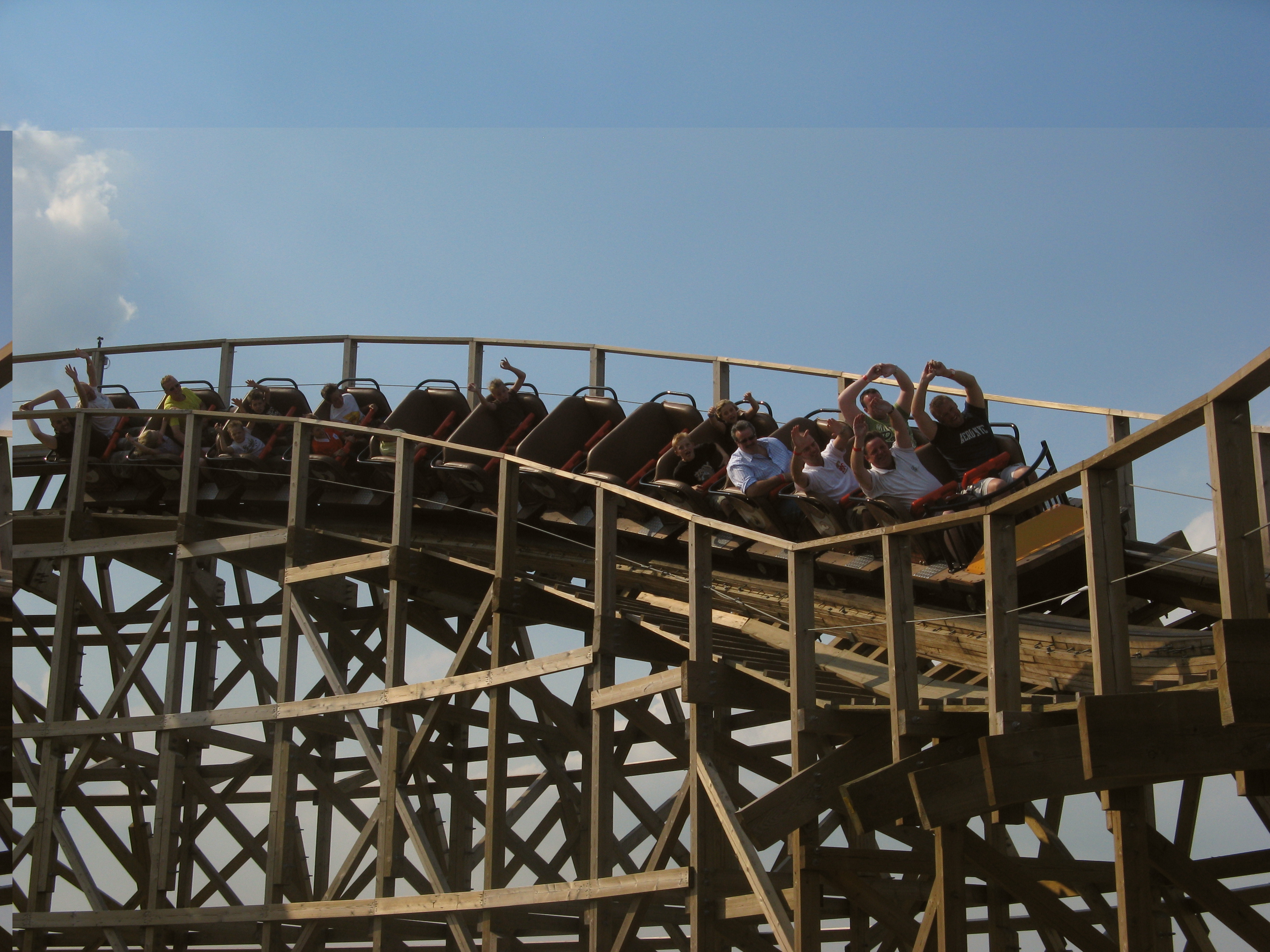
Troy at Toverland is one of GCI's roller coasters that runs Millennium Flyer trains

Most GCI-designed roller coasters run with in-house–designed articulated Millennium Flyer trains. The only exception is Roar at Six Flags America, which runs with Philadelphia Toboggan Coasters–designed trains. Early GCI roller coasters also used PTC trains, such as Gwazi at Busch Gardens Tampa Bay. In 2016, when GCI retracked GhostRider, a Custom Coasters International wooden coaster at Knott's Berry Farm, they provided new Millennium Flyer trains. The following year, Wildcat at Lake Compounce also received Millennium Flyer trains, even though the coaster was made by Philadelphia Toboggan Coasters or PTC.

These trains are known for their cushioned seats, allowing riders to be comfortable during rides. These trains also contain individual lap bars which automatically lower and lock into a position to accommodate the rider, allowing quicker dispatch times. With their easily identified open, gate-like fronts, usually customized with the logo for the respective ride on which they are running, Millennium Flyer trains are styled similarly to trains seen during the golden age of rollercoasters.

GCI unveiled a new train design, the Infinity Flyer, at the 2018 IAAPA Expo in Orlando, Florida. The new train design was designed and engineered by Skyline Attractions and is capable of performing inversions and other elements. Zambezi Zinger at Worlds of Fun was the first rollercoaster to use these trains.

== List of roller coasters ==
As of 2024, Great Coasters International has built 32 roller coasters around the world.

Name	Model	Park	Country	Opened	Status	Ref
Wildcat	Wood Support Structure	Hersheypark	United States	1996	Converted; Now known as Wildcat's Revenge	
Roar	Wood Support Structure	Six Flags America	United States	1998	Closed	
Roar	Wood Support Structure	Six Flags Discovery Kingdom	United States	1999	Converted; Now known as The Joker	
Gwazi	Wood Support Structure	Busch Gardens Tampa	United States	1999	Converted; Now known as Iron Gwazi	
Lightning Racer	Wood Support Structure	Hersheypark	United States	2000	Operating	
Ozark Wildcat	Wood Support Structure	Celebration City	United States	2003	Removed	
Thunderhead	Wood Support Structure	Dollywood	United States	2004	Operating	
Thunderbird	Wood Support Structure	PowerPark	Finland	2006	Operating	
Kentucky Rumbler	Wood Support Structure	Beech Bend	United States	2006	Operating	
Renegade	Wood Support Structure	Valleyfair	United States	2007	Operating	
Troy	Wood Support Structure	Toverland	Netherlands	2007	Operating	
American Thunder; Formerly Evel Knievel	Wood Support Structure	Mid America Adventure	United States	2008	Operating	
El Toro	Wood Support Structure	Freizeitpark Plohn	Germany	2009	Operating	
Prowler	Wood Support Structure	Worlds of Fun	United States	2009	Operating	
Apocalypse The Ride; Formerly Terminator Salvation: The Ride	Wood Support Structure	Six Flags Magic Mountain	United States	2009	Operating	
Joris en de Draak	Wood Support Structure	Efteling	Netherlands	2010	Operating	
Wood Coaster	Wood Support Structure	Knight Valley	China	2011	Closed; Standing but not operating	
Wodan Timbur Coaster	Wood Support Structure	Europa Park	Germany	2012	Operating	
White Lightning	Steel Support Structure	Fun Spot America Orlando	United States	2013	Operating	
Gold Striker	Wood Support Structure	California's Great America	United States	2013	Operating	
Python in Bamboo Forest	Wood Support Structure	Nanchang Sunac Land	China	2016	Operating	
Jerome's Wooden Dragon; Formerly Jungle Dragon	Wood Support Structure	Happy Valley Chongqing	China	2017	Operating	
Heidi: The Ride	Wood Support Structure	Plopsaland	Belgium	2017	Operating	
InvadR	Steel Support Structure	Busch Gardens Williamsburg	United States	2017	Operating	
Mystic Timbers	Wood Support Structure	Kings Island	United States	2017	Operating	
Great Desert-Rally	Wood Support Structure	Happy Valley Chengdu	China	2017	Operating	
Wicker Man	Wood Support Structure	Alton Towers	United Kingdom	2018	Operating	
Wilkołak	Wood Support Structure	Majaland Kownaty	Poland	2019	Operating	
Texas Stingray	Steel Support Structure	SeaWorld San Antonio	United States	2020	Operating	
Roaring Timbers	Wood Support Structure	Sun World Hon Thom Nature Park	Vietnam	2022	Operating	
Zambezi Zinger	Steel Support Structure	Worlds of Fun	United States	2023	Operating	
Hala Madrid; Formerly Bombay Express	Steel Support Structure	Real Madrid World	United Arab Emirates	2024; SBNO from 2020 to 2024	Operating	
Colossus	Steel Support Structure	Six Flags Qiddiya City	Saudi Arabia	2025	Operating	
Wild Buffalo	Wood Support Structure	La Mer de Sable	France	2025	Operating	
Mad Racers	Steel Support Structure	Fantasy Valley	China	2026	Under Construction	
Unknown	Wood Support Structure	Park Mirakulum	(Czech Republic) Czechia	2027	Under Construction	
Wadatsumi	Steel Support Structure	Greenland	Japan	2028	Under Construction	

=== Retracking ===
- Roller Coaster at Lagoon
- Wildcat at Lake Compounce
- The Legend at Holiday World
- Yankee Cannonball at Canobie Lake Park
- Wolverine Wildcat at Michigan's Adventure
- GhostRider at Knott's Berry Farm
- Predator at Darien Lake
- The Racer at Kings Island
- Grizzly at Kings Dominion
- Timber Wolf at Worlds of Fun
- Regina II at Tobu Zoo
