= Beech Bend =

Amusement park outside Bowling Green, Kentucky

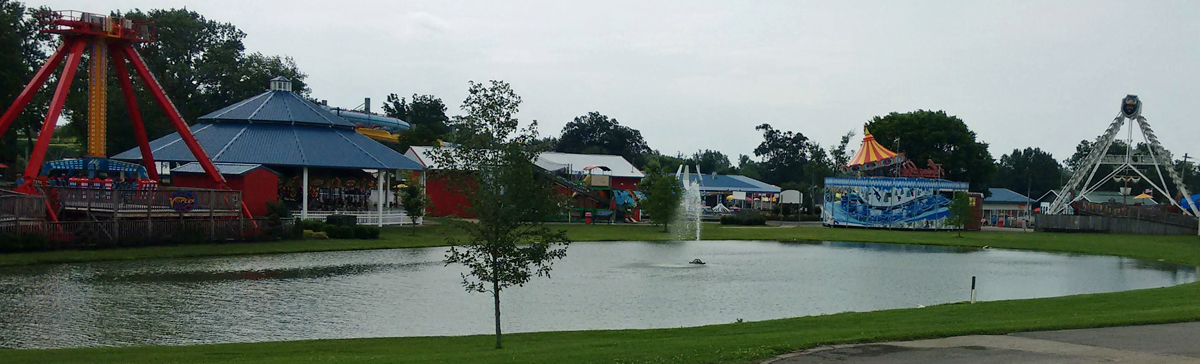
- Overlooking the lake at Beech Bend Park in 2016
- Interactive map of Beech Bend
- Location: Warren County, in Bowling Green, Kentucky, U.S.
- Coordinates: 37°01′27″N 86°23′43″W
- Status: Operating
- Opened: 1898
- Owner: Charlotte Gonzalez
- Slogan: It's always a good time!
- Operating season: May–September
- Area: 215 acres (87 ha) (Total Area)

Attractions
- Total: 47
- Roller coasters: 3
- Water rides: 1
- Website: Website

Beech Bend is an amusement park, campground and automobile race track located in Warren County, in the U.S. state of Kentucky, just outside the limits of the city of Bowling Green.

== History ==
The park takes its name from a bend in Barren River where stands of beech trees are scattered throughout the area. The area was used for picnics as early as the 1880s. Charles Garvin purchased the park property in the early 1940s, adding amusements both rides and recreational activities over the years. The first ride was a pony ride, followed by a roller skating rink, dance hall, bowling center and swimming pool.

=== Mechanics arrive ===
Shortly after World War II, Garvin added mechanical rides to Beech Bend Park, beginning with a Ferris wheel purchased from the Chicago World's Fair. Racing began about that same time with motorcycles. Auto racing began on a 3/8-mile (600 m) oval dirt track; that same track, now paved, is still in use today. A dragstrip was added in the 1950s.

=== The 1960s ===
The 1960s marked the park's heyday. Gate admission was ten cents, with promotions known as "County Days," spotlighting a county within the Bowling Green, Kentucky area each week. Carnival-type rides were abundant, with the famous Wild Mouse the most popular; midway games such as Skee ball and Fascination were a hit with guests. The campground grew over the years, with more than 1,000 spaces advertised at its peak, billed at one time as the world's largest. (The campground was home to the original store of what is now Camping World, a large camping supply retailer founded by David Garvin, Charles Garvin's son.) A small zoo was also added.

=== The 1970s and early 1980s ===
In the 1970s, the park went into a state of decline, largely due to competition from theme parks such as Opryland USA in nearby Nashville, Tennessee. Garvin's health was also in steady decline. When he died in 1979, the park closed, though the racing facilities stayed open under a lease agreement to a third-party operator. The park was purchased by an ownership group that included country music singer Ronnie Milsap, which operated it in 1981 and 1982.

Jim Varney's first television commercial as character Ernest P. Worrell was for Beech Bend. Varney's character was advertising an appearance by the Dallas Cowboys Cheerleaders in 1980.

The park closed again, with ownership reverting to Garvin's heirs.

=== Changes ===
In 1984, Dallas and Alfreda Jones purchased the racetracks and began hosting national drag racing events sanctioned by the National Hot Rod Association. The racetracks did well, and three years later, the couple purchased the rest of the park, which had by then fallen back into nature. No work was done on the old park until the 1990s, when the Jones' began to clear out the park and renovate the campground. In 1998 the pool was reopened along with some new amusement rides being added to the park — much as Charles Garvin had done in the park's early years. It hosts the annual National Hot Rod Reunion.

== Recent history ==
In 2001, the park introduced the Looping Star roller coaster, which was 31-feet tall and 1,202 feet-long. The Gold Rush Miniature Golf course was added to the park for the 2003 season. In late 2002, construction began on Splash Lagoon water park, which included the existing olympic-sized swimming and added the Ragin' Rapids Water Slides, and Lotta Wotta Island, a children's play structure. The water park was originally scheduled to open in 2003, however its grand opening was postponed, and Splash Lagoon opened on May 22, 2004. By 2005, Beech Bend Park had more than 40 rides, 500 campground spaces with modern amenities, renovated racing facilities, a water park and large picnic pavilions. The race tracks were hosting numerous Corvette racing events (the park is only a few miles away from the General Motors factory that produces the sports car), plus the annual NHRA Hot Rod Reunion. The park opened a Zamperla Twisting Wild Mouse coaster, Zamperla Steamboat ride and a drop tower called the Shock Drop for the 2005 season.

In November 2004, during the IAAPA trade show in Orlando, Florida, Dallas Jones began discussions with Great Coasters International about constructing a wooden roller coaster at Beech Bend Park. On July 28, 2005, it was announced that the roller coaster would open in 2006, have a height of 96 feet (29 m), an 82-foot (25 m) drop, a maximum speed of 47 miles (76 km) per hour, and that a contest would be held to choose the ride's name. On October 28, 2005, the park announced that the ride would be called Kentucky Rumbler. The roller coaster opened on May 6, 2006.

The year 2007 brought permanent replacements for some of the older mobile rides. In October the park announced the Holiday Lights Spectacular that ran through January. The Kentucky Rumbler was operating along with other smaller flat rides open.

In 2008, the park added a brand new Carousel, The Grand Carousel. A new show called "The Magic of Music" involved music from the 1960s, 1970s and 1980s. They also had Cirque Africa Show that ran June 16 through June 23. For the kids the park introduced a new park character show, "Singing with Sammy the Squirrel, and from July 14 through July 23 the park had a kids' festival. Thrill seekers received a brand new Scat 2.

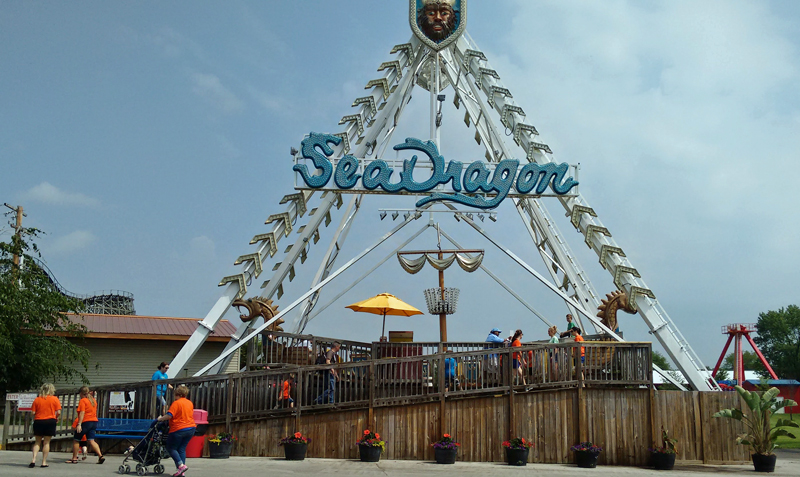
The Sea Dragon ride from Michael Jackson's Neverland Ranch was installed at Beech Bend Park in 2009.

In 2009, Beech Bend debuted the Chance Rides Sea Dragon ride which was purchased from Michael Jackson's Neverland Ranch and was alleged to be his favorite ride. The Looping Star Roller Coaster was removed at the end of the season.

In 2010, Beech Bend opened a large waterpark expansion (wave pool, lazy river and a water play structure), a Zamperla family tea cups ride, a kids' quad runner and a new amphitheater, billed as the largest in Beech Bend's history and was to open in early May. The expansion was delayed by two months due to the 2010 Tennessee floods, and the water play structure and amphitheater did not open until the 2011 season. The first ride at the park, the Ferris wheel, was standing but not operating the whole season, and was removed for the 2011 season.

In 2011, the old Haunted House ride was completely overhauled, with new effects and cars added to it. The Shock Drop drop tower was removed at the end of the season.

The replacement for Shock Drop arrived in 2012, in the form of the 140-foot-tall drop tower named Zero-G, named by people who participated in a naming contest on Facebook. Ironically, Zero-G was made by the same manufacturer as Shock Drop was; ARM. As well as the park purchased new ThunderVolt Speedway Go-Karts.

In 2013, the Park added the Vortex manufactured by Chance Rides. The Vortex is swinging pendulum ride that swings riders 60 feet into the air reaching a maximum swing angle of 240 degrees. Riders sit facing each other, and at the maximum height of the swing, riders are suspended upside down.

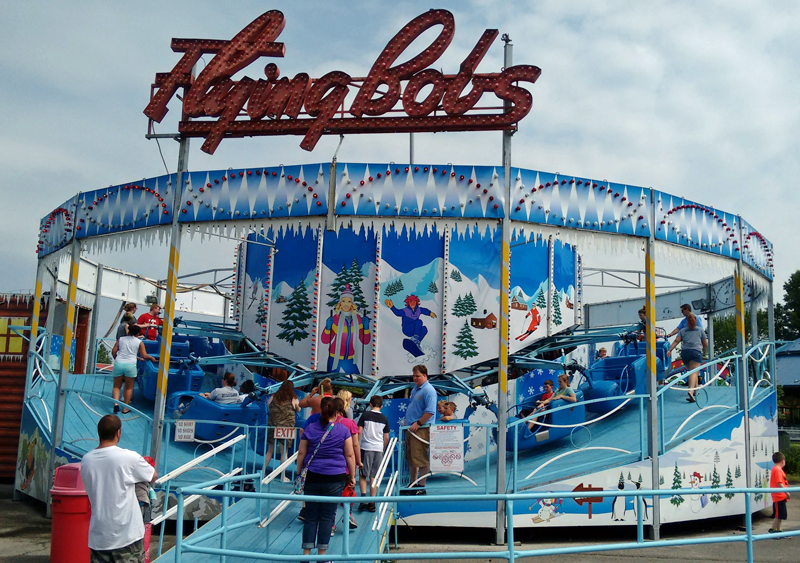
The Flying Bobs ride, seen here in 2016, was refurbished in 2014. It has since been removed.

In 2014, no new rides were added, but several of the older rides were repainted and rebuilt.

In 2015, the park added 5 new rides. The Tornado and Sizzler rides were replaced with new versions. Power Surge was replaced by Air Race, as well as the park added a children's monster truck ride, and Bluegrass Breeze a Flying Carousel make their way to Beech Bend for the 2015 season. On August 15, a train on the Dragon coaster derailed, leading to the ride's removal.

For the 2016 year, Beech Bend invested in a multimillion-dollar expansion to the water park, involving four new slides manufactured by ProSlide. One slide, the Cyclone Saucers, is the first of its kind in North America. Because of the expansion, several rides had to be relocated. Spinning Out, a spinning family coaster, was also added in 2016, taking the place of the Dragon Coaster.

In 2022, the park replaced its aging Flying Bobs with a more modern ride of the same type dubbed Thunderbolt. The ride, a portable model like its predecessor, was relocated from Rye Playland.

On February 25, 2023, park owner Dallas Jones died.

== Current attractions ==
=== Roller coasters ===
Name	Opened	Manufacturer	Description
Kentucky Rumbler	2006	Great Coasters International	A wooden roller coaster that was partially based upon the Rye Playland (New York) Aeroplane Coaster's first drop. Holds the world record for most coaster station fly-bys, at three.
Wild Mouse	2005	Zamperla	A steel spinning wild mouse coaster.
Spinning Out	2016	SBF Visa Group	A spinning family steel roller coaster. Replaced the Dragon Coaster.

=== Family and thrill rides ===
Name	Opened	Manufacturer	Notes
Air Race	2015	Zamperla	New for 2015. Replaced the Power Surge ride. It is an aeroplane-style ride that takes riders upside-down multiple times.
Adult Bumper Cars	???	Nitro	Classic bumper cars attraction
Bluegrass Breeze	2015	Bertazzon	A Flying Carousel.
Dizzy Dragon	2000	Larson	N/A
Speedway Go Carts	2012	J&J	Go kart track that has existed since the 1950s; up-charge attraction. New ThunderVolt Speedway cars added in 2012. Cost to ride is $5 for adult drivers and $3 for passengers. Drivers must be 60 inches tall to drive.
Grand Carousel	2008	Chance Rides	Has 2 chariots, as well as unique animals such as a seahorse, lion, rabbit, camel along with the traditional horses.
Haunted House	2011	????	Radically refurbished in 2011 with new props, effects, and overall performance. Formerly a Pretzel dark ride.
Hip Hop Drop	2010	Moser	Spring ride. Was relocated in 2014 to be in front of Zero G, the adult drop tower. Switched locations with Bumble Bee Bop.
Hubcab Alley Antique Cars	2002	Arrow Dynamics	Antique Cars ride.
Gold Rush Golf	2003	Harris Miniature Golf Courses Inc.	18 Hole Miniature golf. It is free and included with park admission. $2 club deposit required.
Moby Dick	2007	Wisdom Rides	A 24-seat version of the Wisdom Genesis.
Scat 2	2008	Dartron	A spinning flat ride that seats 16 people across two platforms.
Sea Dragon	2009	Chance Rides	Notable for being the same ride at Michael Jackson's Neverland Ranch; was stated to be his favorite ride and was bought by Beech Bend shortly after his death. The park plays Michael Jackson music at the ride.
Sizzler	2015	Wisdom Rides	N/A
Starship 4000	2010	Wisdom Rides	A Gravitron ride.
Tea Party	2010	Zamperla	A tea cups ride.
Tilt-A-Whirl	1999	Larson	Classic Tilt-a-whirl.
Thunder Bolt	2022	Chance Rides	Beach Bend's newest ride. The Thunder Bolt replaced the Flying Bobs.
Tornado	1999	Wisdom Rides	Replaced in 2015 by a new version of the same ride, and again in 2018 with another of the same ride.
Vortex	2013	Chance Rides	A Pendulum Ride
Whitewater Express	2002	Reverchon	Permanently installed traveling Log Flume. It has two drops, a medium-sized hill with a double-down, and a Large Drop.
Zero-G	2012	Designed by A.R.M. Built by Larson	A 130-foot tall drop tower.

=== Kiddie rides ===
Name	Opened	Notes
Crazy Bus	2001	Zamperla Crazy Bus.
Happy Pond	2000	Manufactured by Larson International.
Jumping Jumbos	2001	Manufactured by Larson International
Kiddie Bumper Cars	???	
Kiddie Whip	2007	
Monster Truck	2015	Wisdom Rides Monster Truck Ride.
Quad Runner	2010	
Rainbow Rock	2006	Larson International Portable Children's Play Structure featuring a tropical jungle theme.
Super Slide	1999	
Groovy Bus	1999	

=== Water Park Attractions ===
Name	Opened	Notes
Cyclone Saucers	2016	Made by ProSlide. The first of the ProSlide FlyingSAUCER model to come to North America.
Lazy River	2010	Starts and ends inside of the Surf's Up Wave Pool.
Lotta Wotta Island	2004	Children's Play Structure that includes 2 kiddie water slides.
Polynesian Plunge	2016	Inline tube slide made by ProSlide. Features a steep drop into a toilet bowl element.
Ragin' Rapids Water Slides	2004	Water Slide Complex that includes 3 mat slides; 1 fully enclosed slide, 1 fully outdoor slide, and 1 slide that starts enclosed and end outdoors.
Surf's Up Wave Pool	2010	Wave Pool with the start and end of the Lazy River to the left and right side.
Tidal Wave	2016	Inline tube slide made by ProSlide. Features a drop, a rise up a steep hill, and another drop.
Tiki Island	2010	Children's Play Structure with 5 kiddie water slides and 2 family water slides.
Riptide	2016	Inline tube slide made by ProSlide. Features a small indoor drop followed by 2 funnels.

=== Removed Rides ===
Name	Closed	Notes
Avalanche	2007	Made by Wisdom Rides. It was a 24-seat version of the Wisdom Genesis. Replaced by the Moby Dick, an exact copy of the ride but with a different theme.
Power Surge	2014	Zamperla Power Surge. Removed after the 2014 season. Replaced by Air Race.
Scat 2	2008	Replaced by another ride exactly like it but a different color. The current Scat 2 is predominately orange while the old one was blue.
Sizzler	2015	Replaced in 2015 by a new version of the same ride. Manufactured by Wisdom Rides. The notable difference is a different color pattern and the addition of color-changing LED lights.
Starship 3000	2010	Manufactured by Wisdom Rides. Replaced by a newer version of the same ride the Starship 4000
Tornado	2015	Made by Wisdom Rides. Replaced in 2015 by a new version of the same ride. The notable difference is that the new ride has a different color pattern and it has color-changing LED lights. It also was placed in a different location. The Bluegrass Breeze Swing Ride is located where the old tornado originally was.
Shock Drop	2012	The attraction opened in 2004, manufactured by ARM. Replaced by a larger permanent version of the same ride.
Jitterbug	2015	Closed because of the ride tipping over and injuring Park Guests.
Dragon Coaster	2015	Manufactured by Wisdom Rides, added to the park in 1999. Replaced in 2016 by the spinning family coaster "Spinning Out", After the ride derailed at the end of the 2015 season.
Flying Bobs	2019	Closed in 2019. Replaced by the Thunderbolt in 2022.
