= Kentucky Rumbler =

Amusement ride

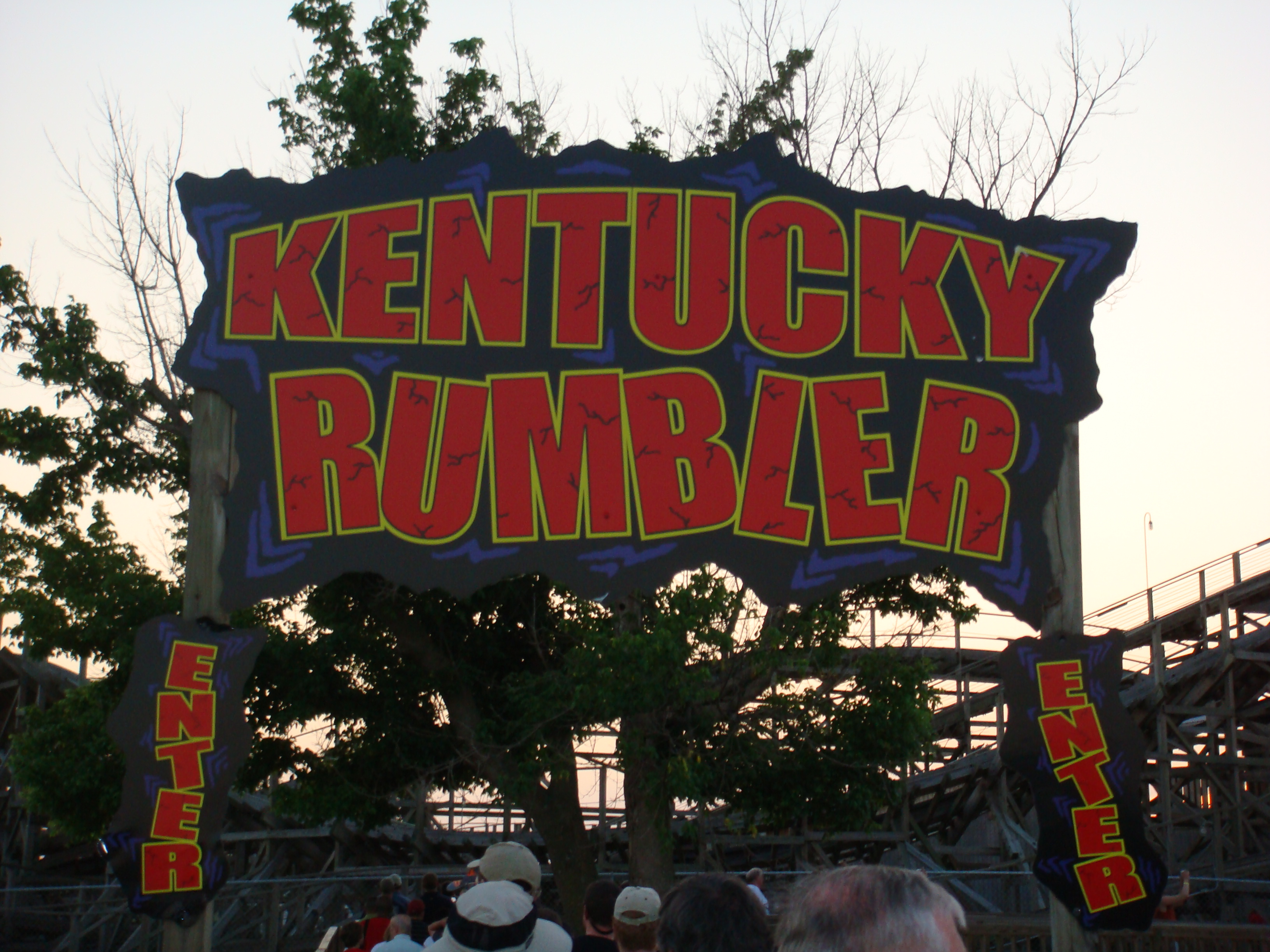
- Ride entrance

Beech Bend Park
- Location: Beech Bend Park
- Coordinates: 37°01′21″N 86°24′06″W
- Status: Operating
- Opening date: May 6, 2006
- Cost: $4,600,000

General statistics
- Type: Wood – Twister
- Manufacturer: Great Coasters International
- Designer: Jeff Pike
- Model: Twister
- Lift/launch system: Chain lift hill
- Height: 96 ft (29 m)
- Drop: 80 ft (24 m)
- Length: 2,827 ft (862 m)
- Speed: 47 mph (76 km/h)
- Inversions: 0
- Capacity: 480 riders per hour
- Height restriction: 48 in (122 cm)
- Trains: Single train with 12 cars; riders arranged 2 across in a single row for a total of 24 riders per train
- Kentucky Rumbler at RCDB

Kentucky Rumbler is a wooden roller coaster at Beech Bend Park in Warren County, Kentucky. It has a drop of 80 feet and a height of 96 feet. Before Kentucky Rumbler, the park did not have a signature ride, and it is the most popular ride in the park.

Voted the 5th best new ride in 2006 by Amusement Today, the Kentucky Rumbler broke records and set others when it opened.

== History ==
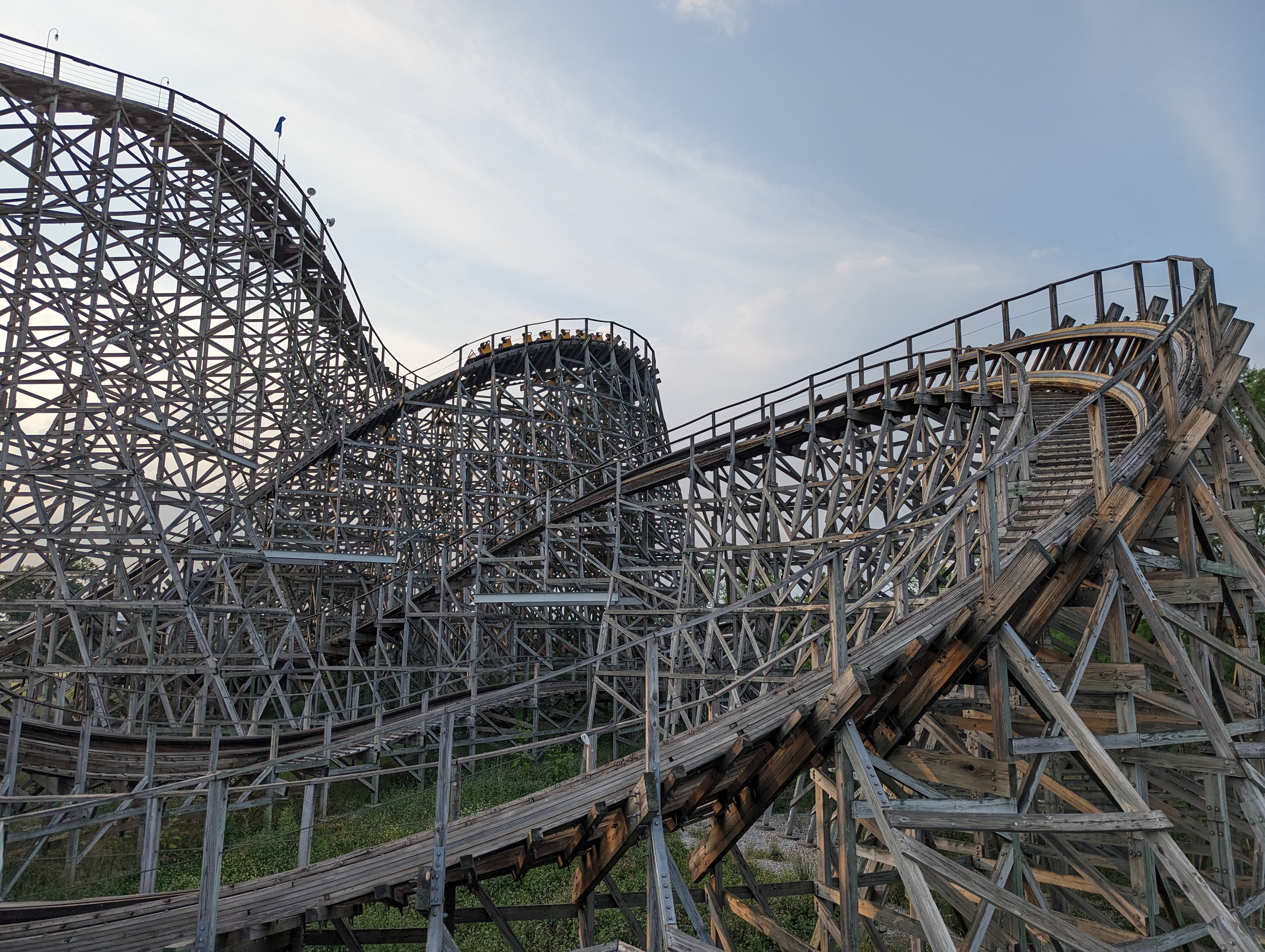
Kentucky Rumbler in 2023.

Between 2000 and 2005 many improvements were made and many features were added to the park. By the end of 2005, 40 rides had been added, including the new coaster the Wild Mouse, 500 campground spaces with modern amenities, renovated racing facilities, a water park and picnic pavilions.

The Jones family started talking about adding a wooden roller coaster to their park years before the Kentucky Rumbler was built. After they decided, Dallas Jones contacted Great Coasters International.

Vice President of Sales & Design Jeff Pike started working for GCII after college, under the tutelage of Mike Boodley. The Kentucky Rumbler was Pike's first solo design.

The Rye Aeroplane is a long-defunct coaster in the city of Rye, New York. It served as the inspiration for parts of the ride, including the first drop. The Rumbler's first drop is a mirror Image of the Aeroplane Coasters.

On October 28, 2005, the park officially named their new wooden roller coaster "Kentucky Rumbler". Derek Sailors from Surfside Beach, South Carolina, was the winner of the contest to name the ride. Beech Bend received thousands of entries for the contest from all over the world.

The Kentucky Rumbler opened in 2006 to great reviews. It was ranked in the Top Five New Rides in the World by Amusement Today magazine, for 2006.

Before the 2023 season Titan Track was added to Kentucky Rumbler. Titan Track is a revolutionary weld-free roller coaster track designed and engineered by Skyline Attractions for Great Coasters International, Inc. (GCII). Approximately 230 feet [70 meters] of Titan Track had been installed on one of the major turns of Kentucky Rumbler.

== Design ==
The ride starts with an exit from the station into a 180° turn to the right, slightly declining. The trains goes over a few small airtime hills, then into another 180°, which leads into the 96’ (29.3 m) chain hill. Following is a small drop which leads into a 270° turn. The main 80’ (24.3 m) drop goes down then turns left where the on-ride camera is located. The ride then goes over an airtime hill, the first station fly -by, into a banked 180° turn. Following is another airtime hill, the second fly-by, into another banked turn. Another banked turn leads into a hill, the third and final fly-by, goes into a couple turns which leads into an incline. The trim brakes slow the train which leads into the station to end the ride.

The ride cost 4.6 million dollars. It is a wooden twister (bobs) coaster with a capacity of 480 guests per hour.

It has one vintage style 24 passenger Millennium Flyer train, made up of 12 cars, that each seat two riders.

The maximum height is 96 feet with the first drop of 80.2 feet. Ride Time is approximately 90 seconds. The Track Length is 2,827 feet.

The Kentucky Rumbler was constructed with 80,000 bolts and 1.5 million nails.

== Awards ==
Golden Ticket Awards: Top wood Roller Coasters
Year									1998	1999
Ranking									–	–
Year	2000	2001	2002	2003	2004	2005	2006	2007	2008	2009
Ranking	–	–	–	–	–	–	20	13	13	17
Year	2010	2011	2012	2013	2014	2015	2016	2017	2018	2019
Ranking	16	16	22	21	20	33	48	49	–	–
Year	2020	2021	2022	2023	2024	2025	2026			
Ranking	N/A	–	–	–	–	–	–			

Note: Kentucky Rumbler has not charted in the Golden Ticket Awards since 2017.
