= Wood Coaster (Mountain Flyer) =

Wooden roller coaster located near Shenzhen, China

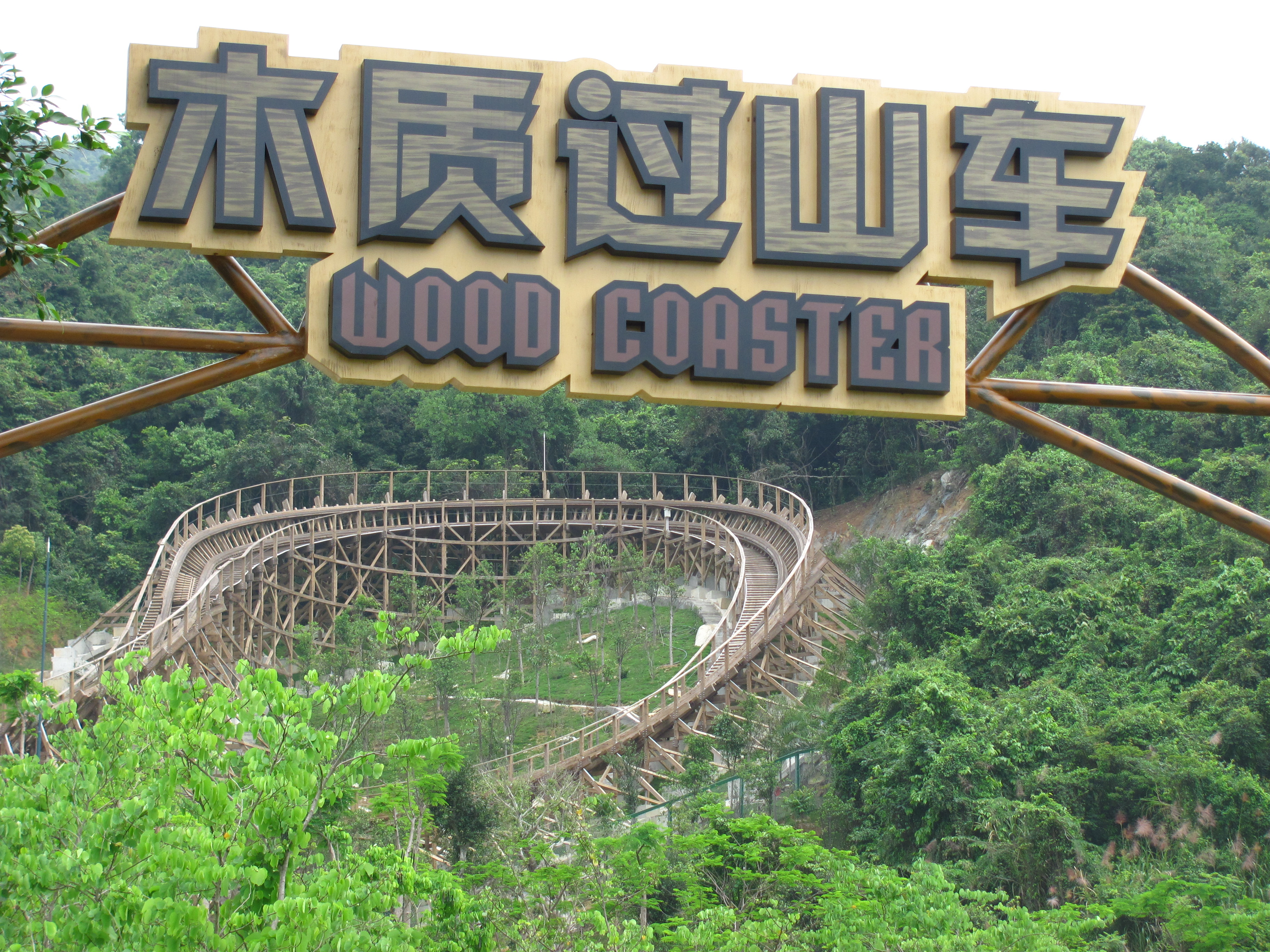

OCT East
- Location: OCT East
- Coordinates: 22.614526°N 114.296758°E
- Status: Closed
- Opening date: July 19, 2011
- Cost: 90,000,000 RMB

General statistics
- Type: Wood – Terrain
- Manufacturer: Great Coasters International
- Designer: Jeff Pike
- Lift/launch system: Chain Lift Hill
- Height: 147 ft (45 m)
- Drop: 131 ft (40 m)
- Length: 4,817 ft (1,468 m)
- Speed: 61.2 mph (98.5 km/h)
- Inversions: 0
- Capacity: 950 riders per hour
- Trains: 2 trains with 12 cars. Riders are arranged 2 across in a single row for a total of 24 riders per train.
- Wood Coaster (Mountain Flyer) at RCDB

Wood Coaster (Chinese: 木质过山车), also known as Mountain Flyer (飞跃巅峰), is a wooden roller coaster located at Knight Valley, in OCT East in Shenzhen, Guangdong, China. The coaster was designed and manufactured by American wooden coaster designers Great Coasters International (GCI). It opened on July 19, 2011. The coaster is notable for its use of the mountain terrain and two station fly-bys, and uses GCI's famous Millennium Flyer trains.

== History ==
On February 16, 2010 GCI announced that they would be building a roller coaster in Knight Valley, which would be "GCI's largest single track coaster yet and will feature a 147 ft (44.8 m) lift and a wild 131 ft (40 m) triple-down first drop." GCI also stated it would begin the ride with a "castle fly-through" before the first drop, however this feature did not make it to the final ride.

The ride was originally meant to open in late 2010, however delays meant it did not open. The ride opened on July 19, 2011 as China's second wooden roller coaster. At opening, it was GCI's longest, tallest and fastest coaster but this has been overtaken by Python in Bamboo Forest at Nanchang Sunac Land.

Recently, the operation of Wood Coaster has been reported as being sporadic, along with the other rides in Knight Valley. It is currently listed as SBNO (Standing But Not Operating).

== Ride Experience ==
Wood Coaster is located on the side of a mountain, and the coaster weaves around it throughout its layout. It also contains two station fly-bys. It uses GCI's Millennium Flyer trains.

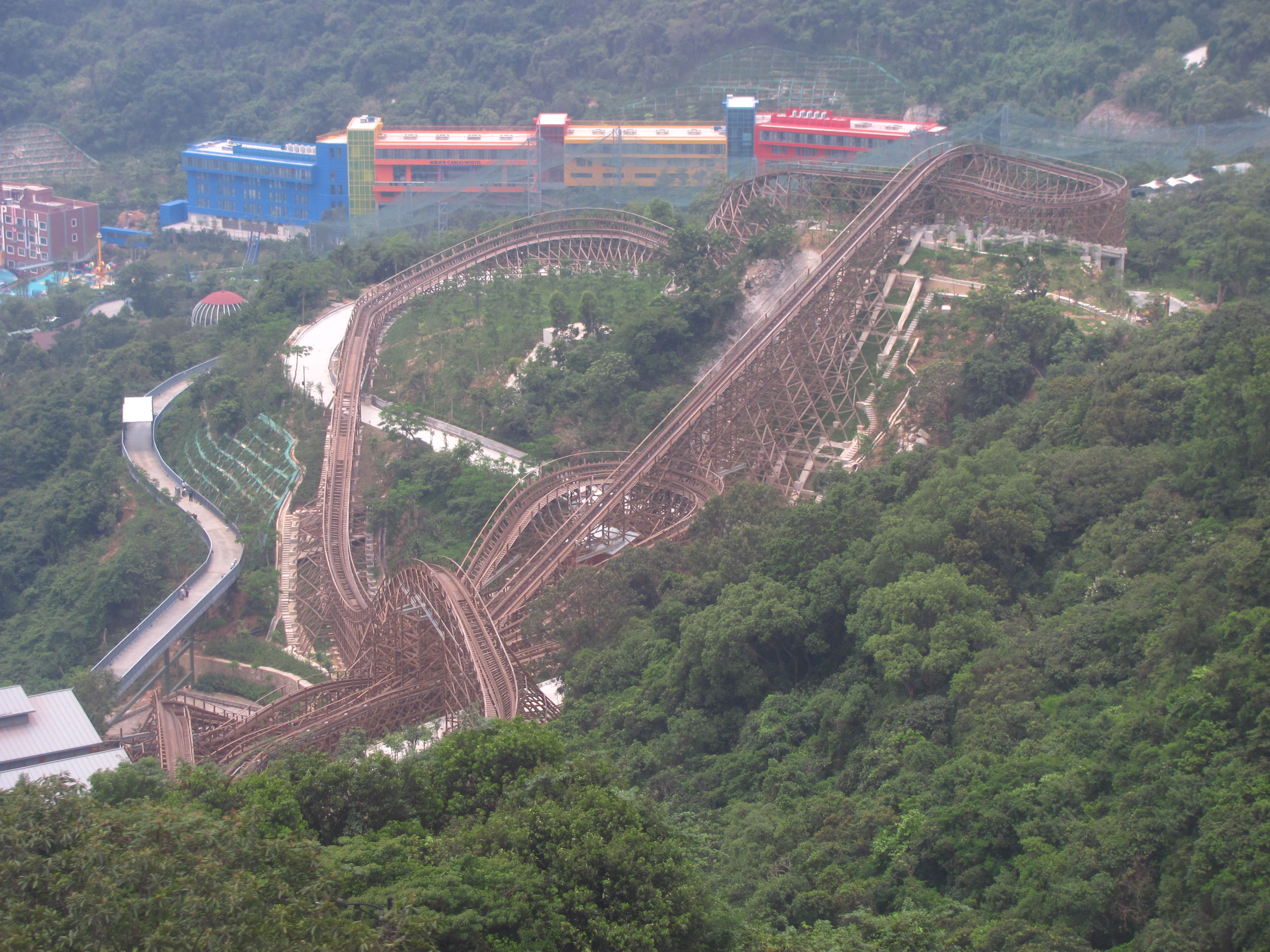
Wood Coaster from above

The ride begins with a slow turn into the 147ft lift hill. At the top, it traverses a 270° right hand turn before heading down the 131ft triple down drop. It then goes around a large left hand turn, before dipping down under the previous piece of track. After a banked airtime hill, it goes through a right hand turn and twisted airtime hill before the first station fly through. Following this is a double down, which then rises back up into an 180° right hand turn. It then traverses a triple down which goes through the station for a second time. Next, it goes through a 270° left hand turn and two airtime hills going over the break run. The ride then ends with a long right hand turn.

== Awards ==
Since the ride opened, it has been ranked highly in many worldwide coaster polls. It was ranked the 14th best wooden coaster in 2012. In the poll Vote Coasters, it reached a peak of the 26th best coaster in the world in 2021.

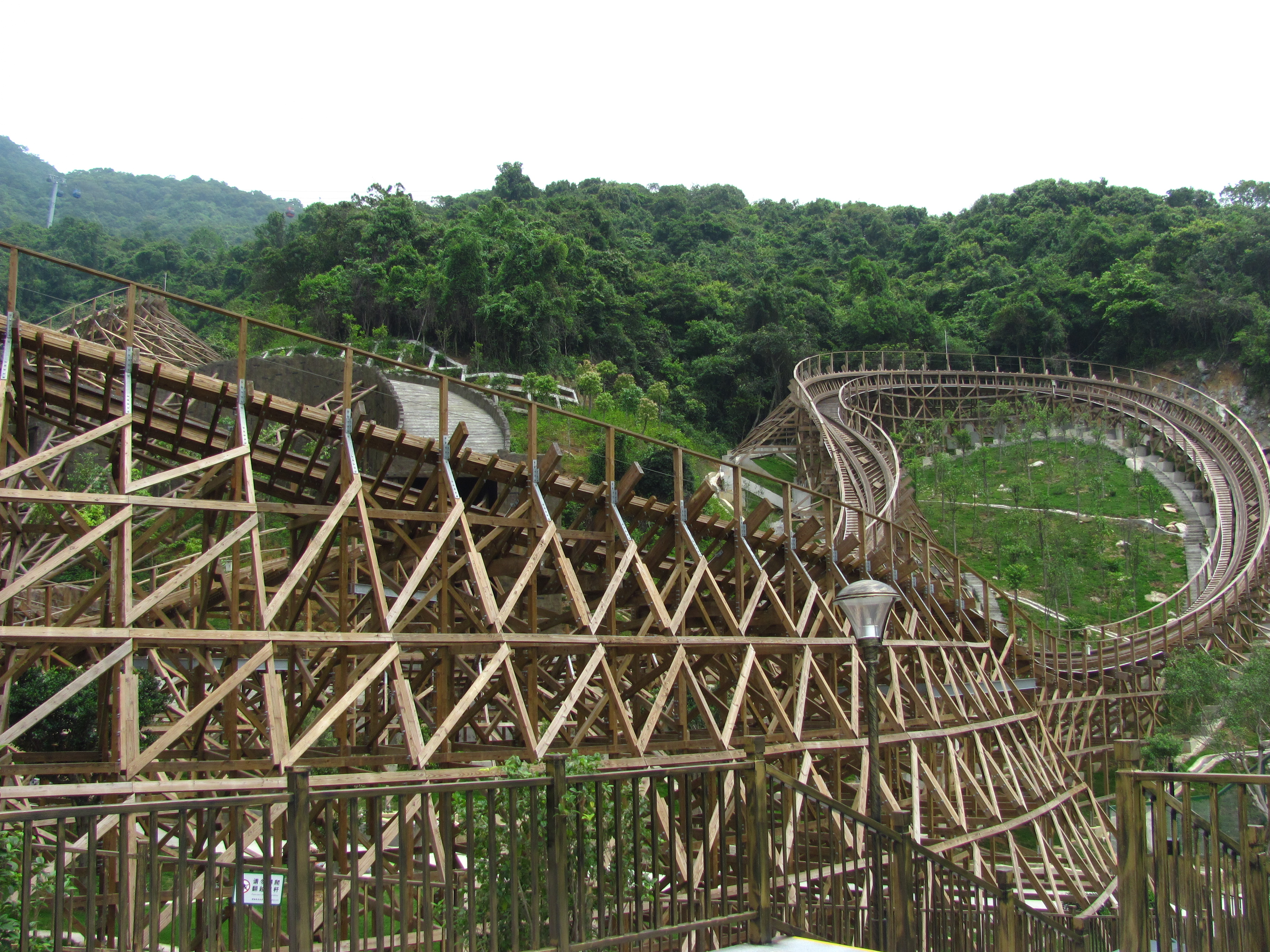
The far end of Wood Coaster's layout

Mitch Hawker's Best Roller Coaster Poll: Best Wood Coaster
Year	2011	2012	2013
Ranking	Not Enough Riders	14	13

Coaster Bot's Vote Coasters
Year	2020	2021	2022	2023	2024
Ranking	N/A	26	27	34	49
