= GhostRider (roller coaster) =

Roller coaster at Knott's Berry Farm

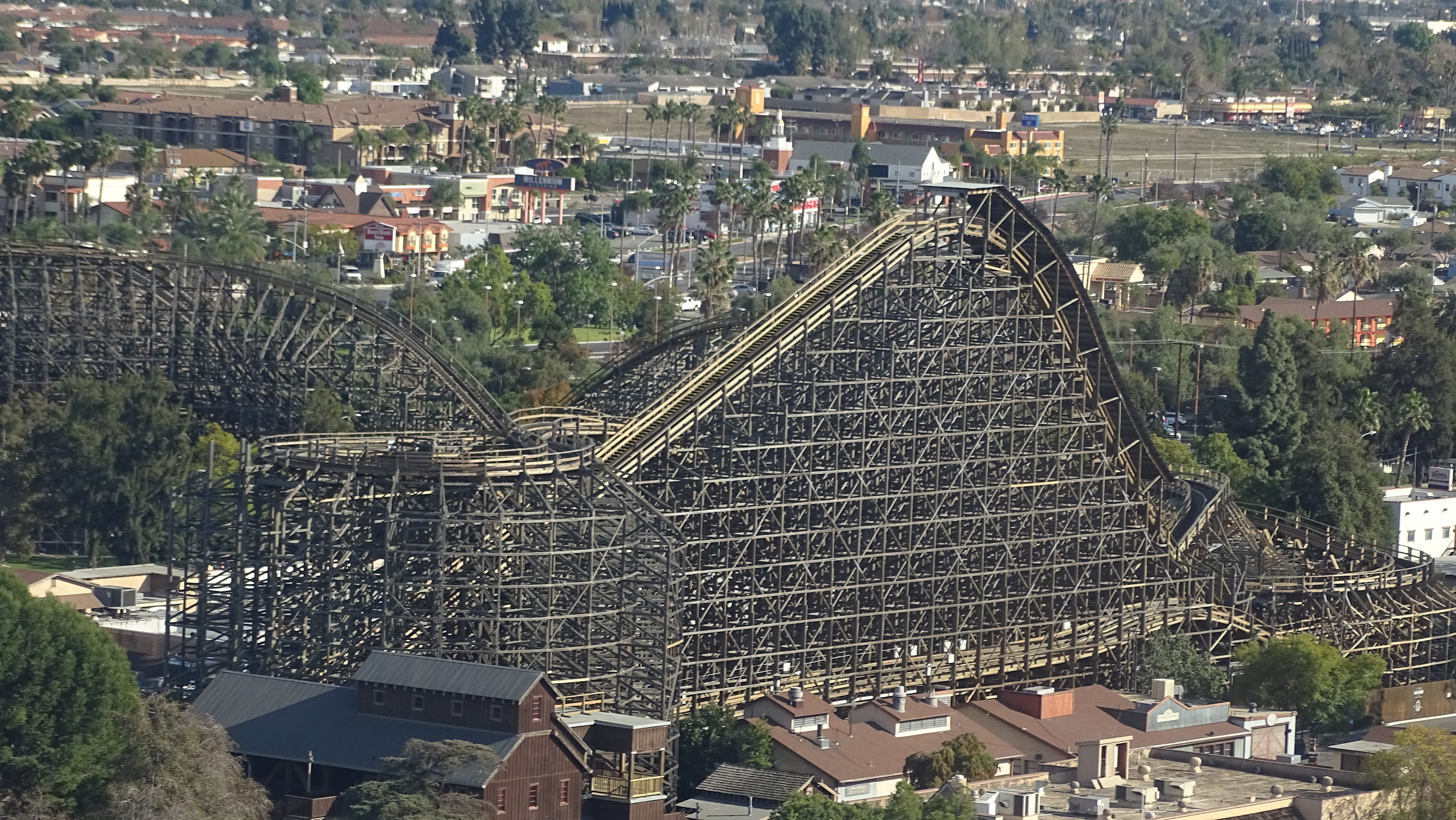
- View of GhostRider

Knott's Berry Farm
- Location: Knott's Berry Farm
- Park section: Ghost Town
- Coordinates: 33°50′31″N 117°59′55″W
- Status: Operating
- Opening date: December 8, 1998
- Cost: $24 million

General statistics
- Type: Wood
- Manufacturer: Custom Coasters International
- Track layout: Double Out and Back
- Lift/launch system: Chain Lift
- Height: 118 ft (36 m)
- Drop: 108 ft (33 m)
- Length: 4,533 ft (1,382 m)
- Speed: 56 mph (90 km/h)
- Inversions: 0
- Duration: 2:40
- Max vertical angle: 51°
- Capacity: 450 riders per hour
- G-force: 3.1
- Height restriction: 48 in (122 cm)
- Trains: 3 (2 in operation) trains with 12 cars; riders arranged 2 across in a single row for a total of 24 riders per train
- Fast Lane available
- GhostRider at RCDB

GhostRider is a wooden roller coaster at Knott's Berry Farm in Buena Park, California. It is located in the Ghost Town section of the park, south of the main entrance. Manufactured by Custom Coasters International, GhostRider is the longest wooden coaster on the West Coast of the United States, measuring 4,533 feet (1,382 m) long and 118 feet (36 m) tall. The ride follows an L-shaped double out and back pattern, with a station themed to a mining building. There are three trains, each themed to a different precious metal, though only two are in use at any given time.

GhostRider was announced in August 1997 as part of an expansion of Knott's Berry Farm. The coaster cost $24 million and opened on December 8, 1998, earlier than originally scheduled. After it opened, GhostRider became one of Knott's most popular rides. Between 2015 and 2016, Great Coasters International conducted a major renovation of the ride, replacing the track and the trains. Amusement Today's annual Golden Ticket Awards has consistently ranked GhostRider among the world's top wooden roller coasters.

== History ==
By 1997, the Knott family, which operated Knott's Berry Farm amusement park in Buena Park, California, planned to add a wooden roller coaster to the park. Knott's already had several major attractions, including the Calico Mine Ride, a prototype Corkscrew coaster, a looping shuttle roller coaster named Montezooma's Revenge, and a water ride named Bigfoot Rapids. According to historian Eric Lynxwiler, who wrote a book about Knott's Berry Farm, a wooden roller coaster was the only major attraction type that was absent from the park. The Knott family had begun planning for a wooden coaster almost five years before GhostRider was ultimately completed in 1998. Knott's officials hoped that the construction of a wooden coaster would increase the park's annual attendance to 4 million.

=== Development ===
A new wooden coaster was announced in August 1997 as part of an expansion of Knott's Berry Farm. The expansion project would cost an estimated $35 million, of which the coaster cost $24 million. The ride would be the park's fifth roller coaster, as well as the first attraction to be built in Knott's Ghost Town section since 1969. The ride would cross over Grand Avenue, which separated the main section of the park from one of its parking lots, and would occupy a portion of that parking lot. It would replace the Pan for Gold attraction and a decorative volcano built by the park's founder, Walter Knott. Knott's vice president for maintenance and construction at the time, Robin Hall, said he wanted the project to serve as a "billboard" for the park on Beach Boulevard, along the park's eastern boundary; the project would also allow Knott's to relocate warehouses in the attraction's path.

Custom Coasters International (CCI) was hired to manufacture the coaster, while Philadelphia Toboggan Coasters (PTC) provided the trains. The project lasted two years. The first phase of the project involved clearing land and relocating the warehouses, which took about a year and comprised much of the ride's budget. The ride would be the Knott family's last investment in the park, as Cedar Fair acquired Knott's Berry Farm in October 1997. At the time, land was still being cleared for the new ride. Cedar Fair's CEO Dick Kinzel briefly considered canceling the ride because of its high cost, but Cedar Fair ultimately continued to develop the new coaster. By March 1998, the ride was being referred to as "Ghost Rider".

Construction of the ride itself took 11 months. Hall said that park officials wanted the ride to be taller than Colossus at Six Flags Magic Mountain, which Hall had also designed. As a result, the ride's height was revised from 112 to 118 ft (34 to 36 m) so it would be taller than Colossus. Labor union members protested outside Knott's Berry Farm in April 1998 over the fact that the park did not hire unionized workers to build GhostRider, prompting the park to file a lawsuit to stop the protests.

=== Operation ===
GhostRider was originally scheduled to open in early 1999, but it opened on December 8, 1998, ahead of schedule. Jack Falfas, the general manager of Knott's, had advocated for an accelerated opening date. During a preview event on the roller coaster's opening day, one hundred members of nonprofit group American Coaster Enthusiasts rode GhostRider. At the time of its opening, GhostRider was advertised as the longest wooden roller coaster on the West Coast of the United States. As of January 2023, it remains the longest wooden roller coaster on the American West Coast as well as the Pacific Coast of the Americas. Park officials also claimed that GhostRider was the fastest wooden coaster on the West Coast; however, Colossus traveled at a maximum speed of 62 mph (100 km/h), compared to GhostRider's 56 mph (90 km/h).

After it opened, GhostRider became one of Knott's most popular rides, and Knott's officials predicted that the ride would increase the park's annual attendance from 3.4 million to 4 million. During the second quarter of 1999, attendance at Knott's increased more than 10 percent quarter-over-quarter, at a time when other amusement parks in Southern California were experiencing decreased attendance. The ride was temporarily closed for repairs in August 1999 after an incident that injured five people.

By 2015, GhostRider had gained a reputation as a rough ride. That August, Knott's officials announced that they would refurbish GhostRider for Ghost Town's 75th anniversary. The ride temporarily closed in September 2015 so Great Coasters International (GCI) could refurbish the attraction. Including the planning process, the project lasted for two years; the renovation itself only took nine months to complete. Buena Park officials had to ensure that the renovation plans complied with building codes and that the ride was resistant to earthquakes. Most of the track was replaced and re-profiled, with banked turns and airtime hills being added. Additionally, the mid-course brake run was removed, and the trains were replaced with Millennium Flyer trains. GCI also replaced the chain lift, added magnetic brakes, and removed steel in the ride's structure as part of the project. GhostRider was originally planned to reopen on May 27, 2016, but the ride ultimately reopened on June 11, 2016.

== Ride experience ==
The ride is located in the Ghost Town section of Knott's Berry Farm, near the main entrance and the California Marketplace section of the park. The ride's official backstory involves a former Union Army soldier who moved to a California mining town in pursuit of gold during a gold rush. According to this backstory, the soldier rode his horse into the mine one day and was never seen again; local residents sometimes reported seeing a ghost riding a horse, hence the ride's name.

=== Queue ===
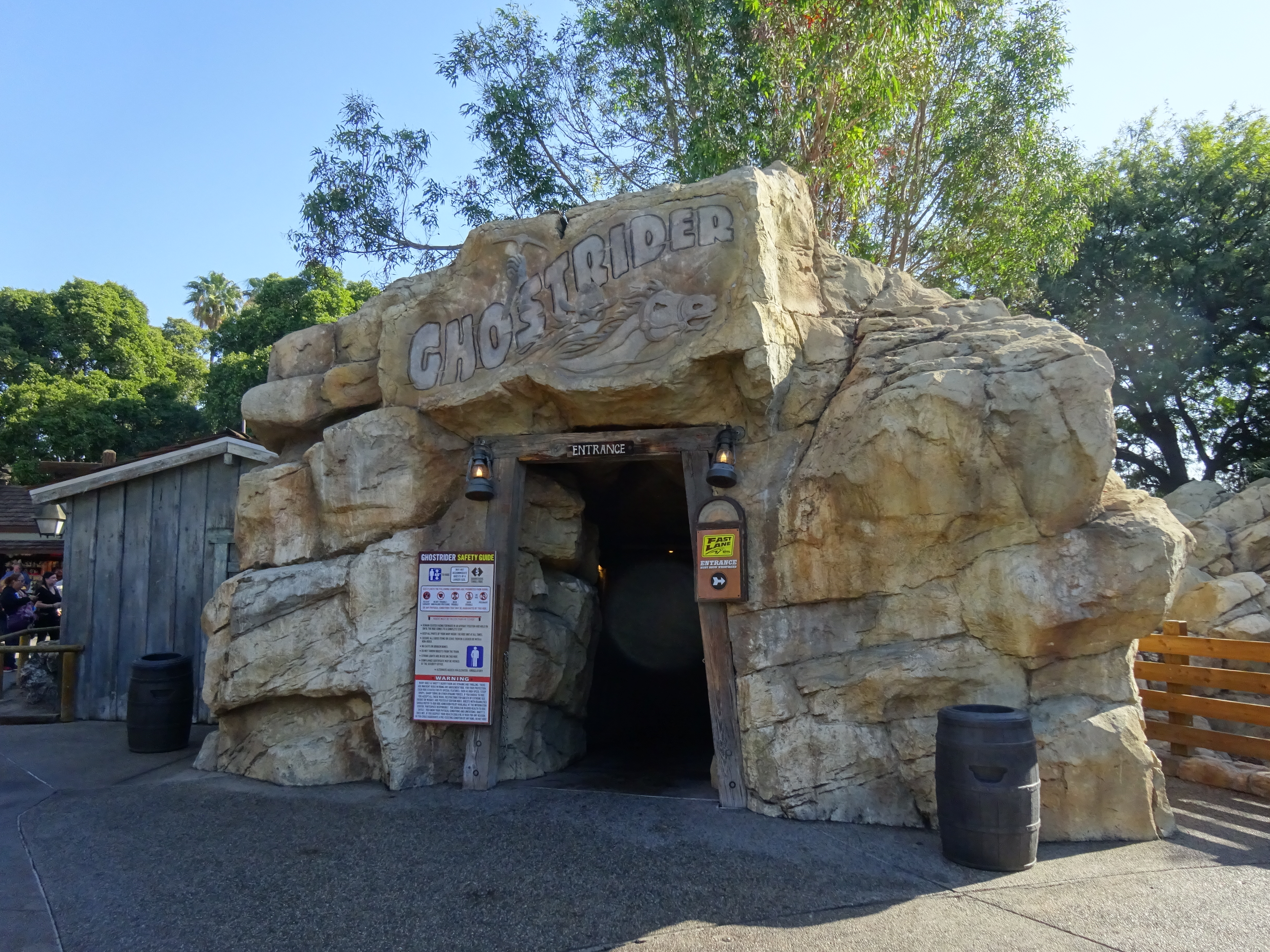
GhostRider's entrance

The ride's station is three stories high and is themed as a mining company's building. Riders approach the ride near the entrance to Ghost Town. The queue begins in a mining tunnel and features an area where guests can pan for gold while waiting in line. At the end of the tunnel, the queue enters the lower level of the fictitious GhostRider Mining Company. The queue ascends to the upper level, where riders board the trains. There is a storage track underneath the upper level of the station.

=== Layout ===
The train is propelled out of the station using drive tires. There is a small left turn and initial descent into a ravine, which is followed by a gradual sweep to the right. The train passes through the transfer track (which leads to the storage track under the station) and climbs the lift hill. Riders descend 108 ft (33 m) into a drop covered by a metal canopy. The train then turns left and rises over an airtime hill before making a sweeping left-hand turnaround. After the turnaround, riders descend again and rise into a gradual right-hand climb before descending into the structure of the lift hill and making a left-turn chicane. Originally, riders then turned into a midcourse brake run. This was removed in 2016.

The turnaround starts in the second half of the ride. Diving off a straight section of track, riders descend a steep drop, making a left-hand turn, rising over an airtime hill, before making a right-hand turnaround underneath the turnaround in the first half. After rising over another airtime hill, the trains enter a 450-degree downward helix to the right, before rising over a final hill and hitting the final brake run.

== Characteristics ==
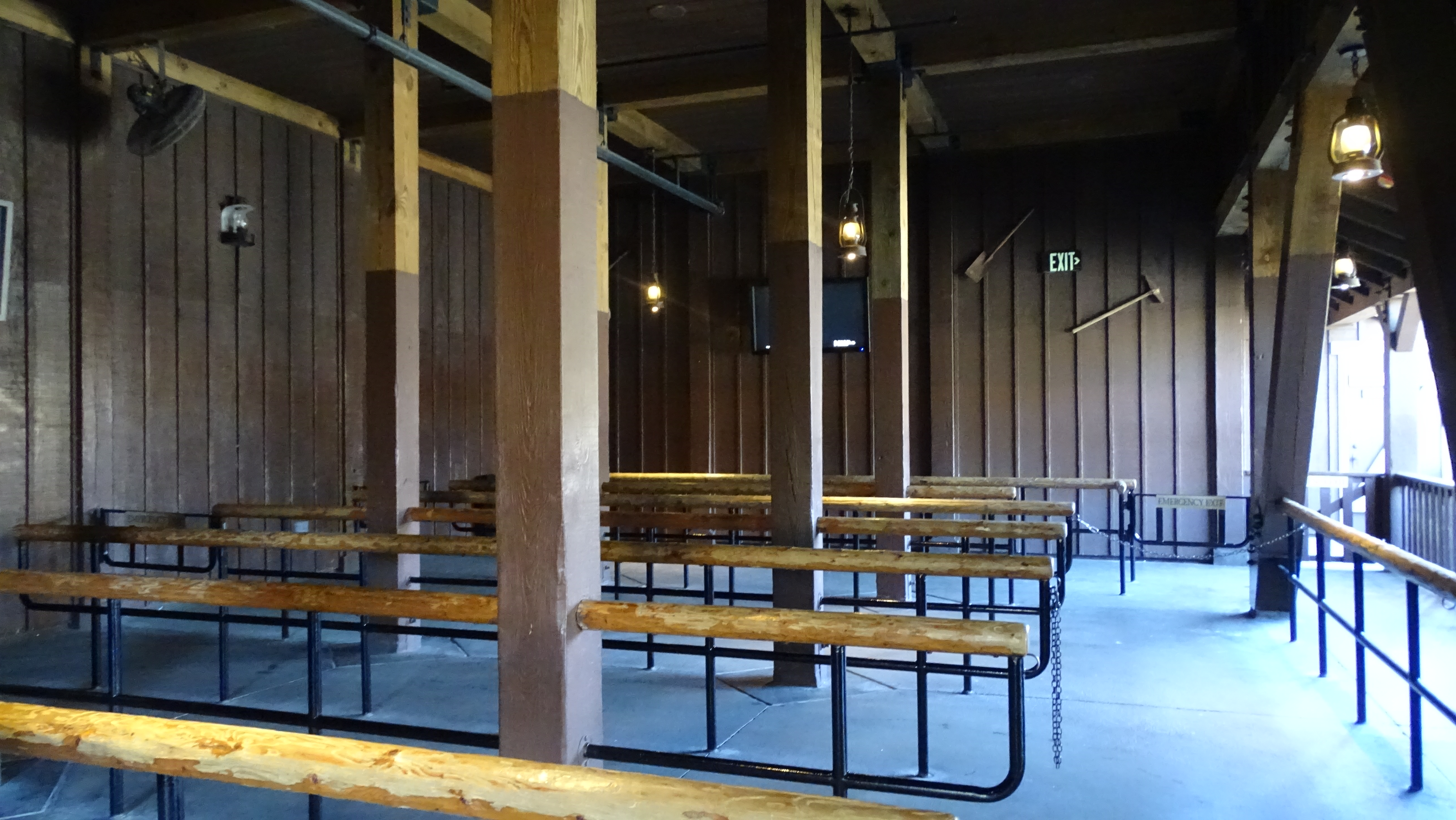
The lower level of the queue in GhostRider's station

The track measures 4,533 ft (1,382 m) long, The ride rises 118 ft (36 m) above ground, and its 51-degree first drop is 108 ft (33 m) tall. The ride was constructed with around 2.5 million board feet of Southern yellow pine from North Carolina and Alabama, as well as 50,000 lb (23,000 kg) of nails. Knott's officials used yellow pine to match the park's Old West theme. During the 2016 renovation, the top layers of the original track were replaced with Ipe wood. It also uses 250 short tons (220 long tons; 230 t) of steel, 1,410 yd^{3} (1,080 m^{3}) of concrete, and 1,000 short tons (890 long tons; 910 t) of nuts and bolts. The ride lasts for about two minutes and forty seconds.

The ride follows an L-shaped double out and back pattern. Most of the attraction is within the parking lot near the marketplace. The ride crosses over Grand Avenue (which connects southbound Beach Boulevard to the parking lots) four times. The track is banked at angles of up to 42 degrees. Trains travel up to 56 mph (90 km/h), subjecting riders to a maximum g-force of 3.14. On straight segments of track, which comprise about 40 percent of the ride's length, the track is made of wooden planks measuring 2 in (51 mm) thick and 8 to 10 in (200 to 250 mm) wide. Curved segments of track, comprising the remaining 60 percent of the ride's length, use smaller boards; after 1999, these boards were bound using metal straps. Because the wooden track tends to expand and compress throughout the year, mechanics conducted daily inspections of the track when it opened, tightening bolts once a year.

The ride uses three trains, although only two are in use at any time. The trains each contain 12 cars; every car seats two guests in a single row. The original trains, manufactured by PTC, were each painted a different color representing a mining metal (gold, silver, and copper). Originally, each car had both a front axle and a rear axle, which added extra weight to each train. After the 2016 GCI refurbishment, the trains were redesigned with a wood-grain motif. The front car of each train retained both axles, but the remaining cars only contained a rear axle. This was done to allow each train to move smoothly, as the previous trains would whip around the course with both axles. Five mechanics maintain the ride and completely reconstruct each of the trains every year.

== Incidents ==
On August 24, 1999, an unsecured piece of wood from the track was lifted by a passing train and thrown into another car that was passing below. Five riders were injured, including a tourist who was hit on the head and required stitches. Knott's officials said that GhostRider was inspected every morning before the park opened, including the day of the accident; during these inspections, workers secured loose bolts and replaced weakening wood. In the aftermath of the accident, CCI recommended that the boards be secured, and park officials installed metal safety devices on GhostRider. The ride reopened on August 30, 1999, after modifications.

Between 2007 and 2012, guests filed two lawsuits against Knott's Berry Farm in relation to the ride. During this period, two other attractions also prompted two lawsuits each; these three rides were the subject of more lawsuits than any other ride at the park.

== Awards ==
Golden Ticket Awards: Top wood Roller Coasters
Year									1998	1999
Ranking									–	13
Year	2000	2001	2002	2003	2004	2005	2006	2007	2008	2009
Ranking	8	6	6	6	8	10	12	17	24	19
Year	2010	2011	2012	2013	2014	2015	2016	2017	2018	2019
Ranking	24	27	23	29	44	–	29	18 (tie)	13	6
Year	2020	2021	2022	2023	2024	2025	2026			
Ranking	N/A	7	8	9	8	7	7			
