= Troy (roller coaster) =

Wooden roller coaster at Toverland

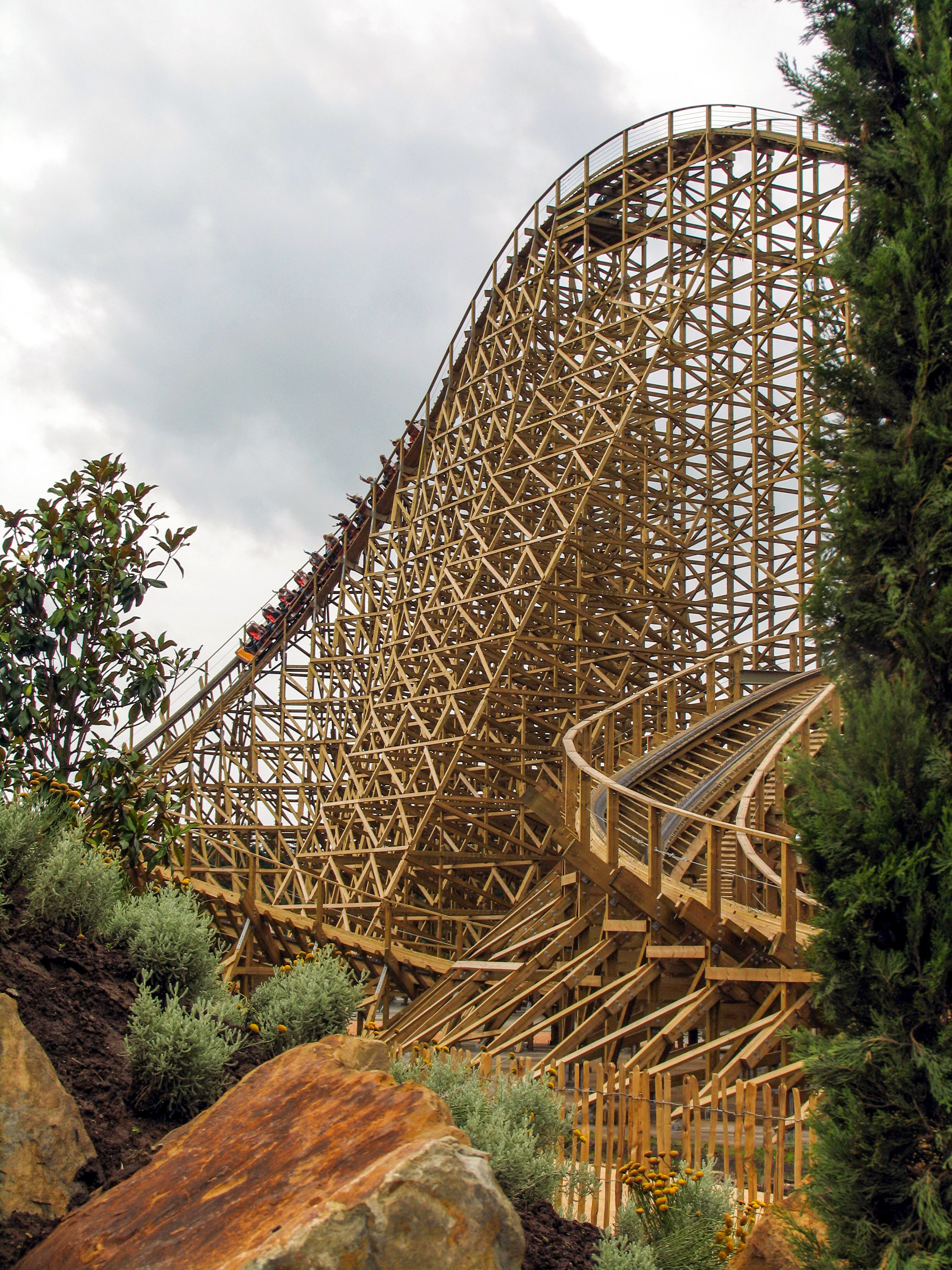
- Troy's first drop

Toverland
- Location: Toverland
- Coordinates: 51.3963°N 5.9829°E
- Status: Operating
- Opening date: 29 June 2007
- Cost: €6,500,000

General statistics
- Type: Wood
- Manufacturer: Great Coasters International
- Lift/launch system: Chain lift hill
- Height: 31.9 m (105 ft)
- Drop: 30.7 m (101 ft)
- Length: 1,077.2 m (3,534 ft)
- Speed: 86.9 km/h (54.0 mph)
- Inversions: 0
- Duration: ~1:50
- Capacity: 850 riders per hour
- G-force: 2.4
- Trains: 2 trains with 12 cars; riders arranged 2 across in a single row for a total of 24 riders per train
- Troy at RCDB

Troy is a wooden roller coaster located at Toverland in Sevenum, the Netherlands. It was manufactured by American manufacturer Great Coasters International (GCI) and opened on June 29, 2007. Troy was GCI's second roller coaster in Europe, following Thunderbird at PowerPark in Finland. With a height of 31.9 metres (105 ft), a maximum speed of 86.9 kilometres per hour (54.0 mph), and a track length of 1,077.2 metres (3,534 ft), Troy is the tallest, fastest, and longest wooden roller coaster in the Netherlands as of 2018.

== Characteristics ==
=== Trains ===
Troy uses GCI's Millennium Flyer trains. The ride has two trains with 12 cars each. Each car seats two riders, allowing a capacity of 24 riders per train. Troy can accommodate 850 riders per hour.

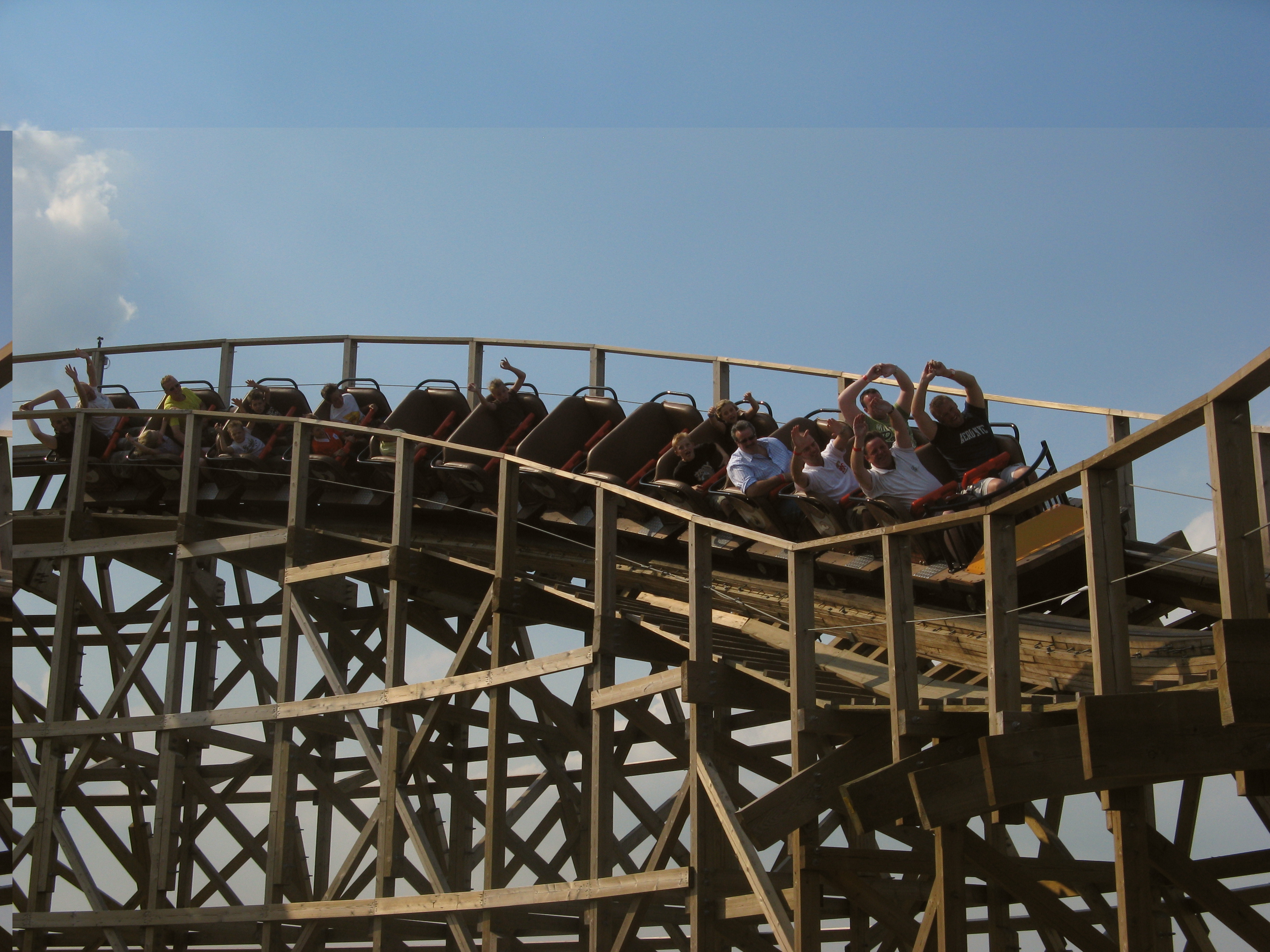
A view of one of Troy's trains

=== Layout and statistics ===
Troy features a lift hill with a height of 31.9 metres (105 ft) and a drop of 30.7 metres (101 ft), reaching a maximum speed of 86.9 kilometres per hour (54.0 mph). The track is 1,077.2 metres (3,534 ft) in length. The ride features several high-speed turns and hills. The ride also has a section where the train travels through the station building at high speed in the middle of the layout. One cycle of the ride lasts approximately 1 minute and 50 seconds.

=== Theme ===
Troy is themed to the story of the Trojan horse.

== Rankings ==
Golden Ticket Awards: Top wood Roller Coasters
Year									1998	1999
Ranking									–	–
Year	2000	2001	2002	2003	2004	2005	2006	2007	2008	2009
Ranking	–	–	–	–	–	–	–	–	26	35
Year	2010	2011	2012	2013	2014	2015	2016	2017	2018	2019
Ranking	41	33	25	28	16	18	24	18 (tie)	25	25
Year	2020	2021	2022	2023	2024	2025	2026			
Ranking	N/A	15	16	19	22	23 (tie)	24			

== Incidents ==
During construction on 5 March 2007, part of Troy's unfinished lift hill structure collapsed due to strong winds. No injuries were reported as a result of the collapse.

== See also ==
- Great Coasters International
