= Wild Mouse (Beech Bend Park) =

Twister roller coaster

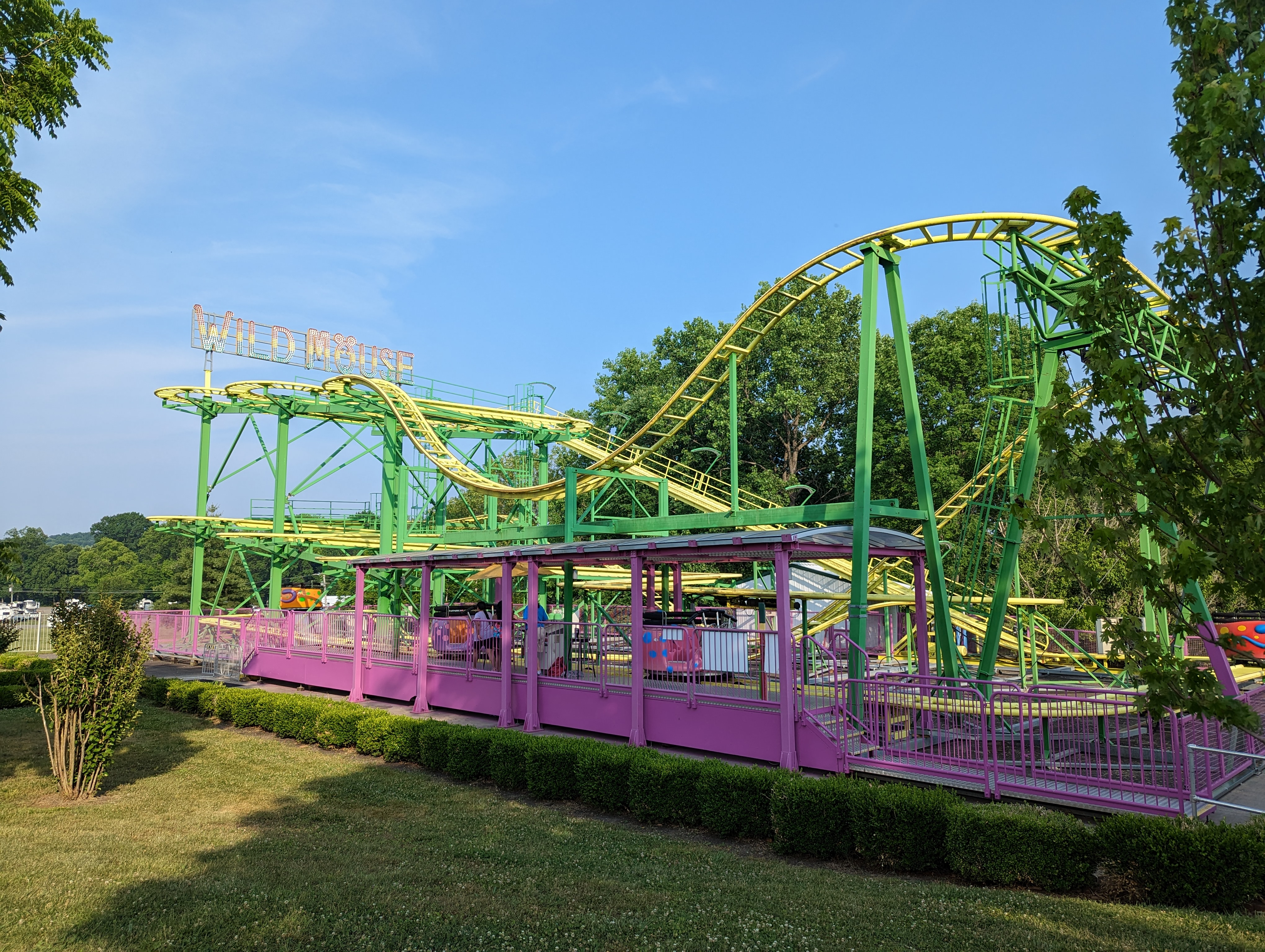

Beech Bend Park
- Location: Beech Bend Park
- Coordinates: 37°01′21″N 86°24′06″W
- Status: Operating
- Opening date: 2005

General statistics
- Type: Steel – Wild Mouse
- Manufacturer: Zamperla
- Model: Twister Coaster 420STD
- Height: 42.7 ft (13.0 m)
- Length: 1,377.9 ft (420.0 m)
- Speed: 29.1 mph (46.8 km/h)
- Inversions: 0
- Duration: 1:30
- Capacity: 900 riders per hour
- G-force: 2.5
- Height restriction: 42 in (107 cm)
- Trains: 4 trains with a single car. Riders are arranged 4 across in a single row for a total of 4 riders per train.
- Wild Mouse at RCDB

Wild Mouse is a steel roller coaster at Beech Bend Park in Warren County, Kentucky. It has a height of 42.7 feet with a length of 1377.9 feet. It was manufactured by Zamperla Rides of Italy. It was installed at Beech Bend Park for the 2005 season, just one year before the park's signature ride the Kentucky Rumbler.

The ride is a Zamperla Twister Coaster ride; there are several coasters like this including Ragin' Cajun at Six Flags America, and the Rockstar Coaster at Fun Spot America. Wild Mouse is a spinning version of the classic Wild Mouse roller coaster. It was named after Beech Bend Park's former wooden Wild Mouse that was removed from the park and sold to Casino Pier Amusement Park in New Jersey.

The Wild Mouse has a total of six trains. Each has one row of 4 seats, and are built to resemble a mouse. The colors of the trains are green, orange, purple, blue, pink, and red. As of 2014 Beech Bend always uses four of the trains. The ride is one of the more popular rides in the park and usually has the longest line of any ride in the park on busy days.

The height requirement is 42 inches tall to ride with an adult, and 48 inches to ride alone. It is located on the opposite side of the park from the Kentucky Rumbler, near Beech Bend Hall.
