= OCT East =

Entertainment and resort complex in Shenzhen, China

Coordinates: 22°38′N 114°17′E

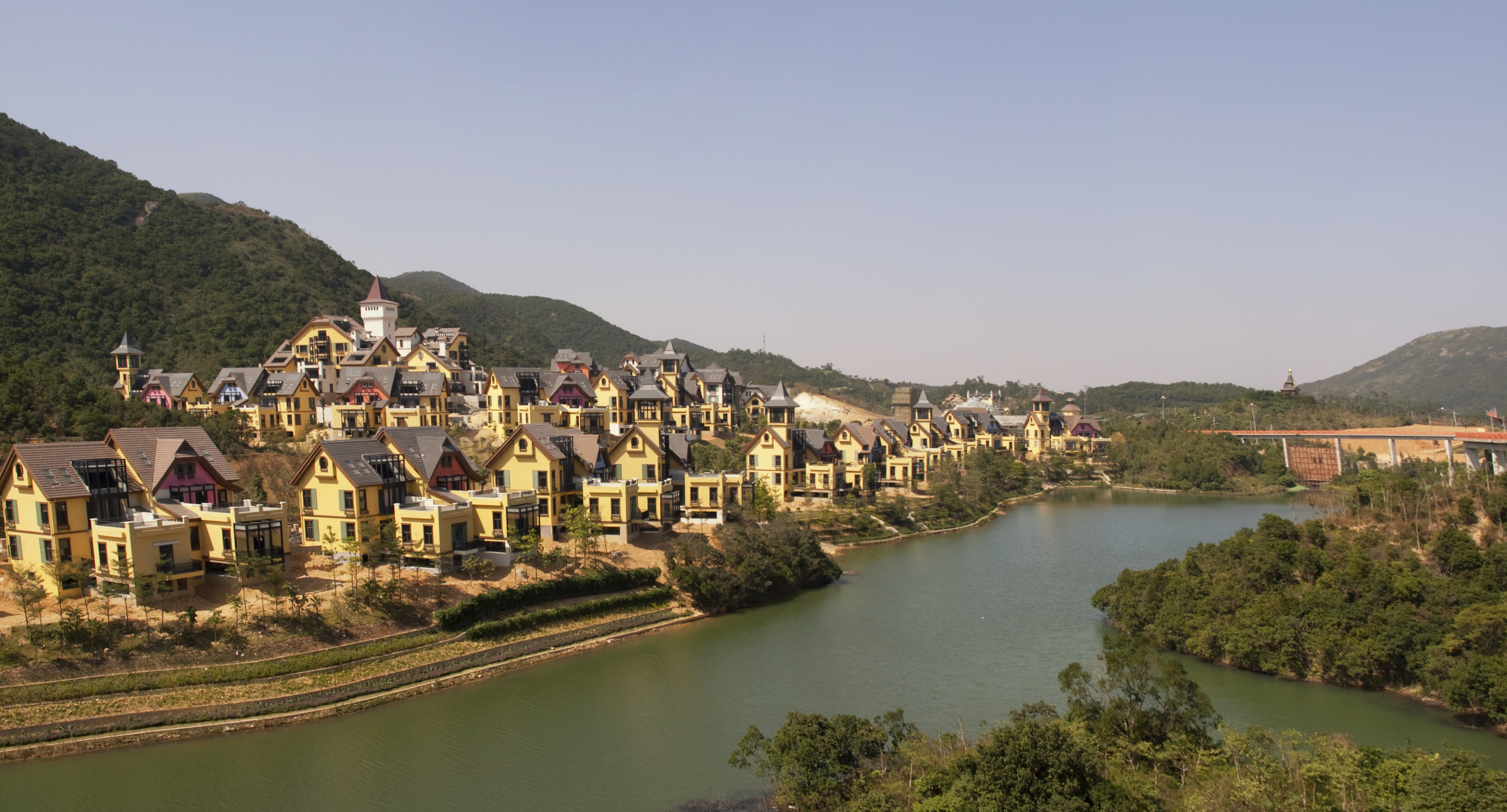
- Interlaken Hotel OCT East
- Simplified Chinese: 东部华侨城
- Traditional Chinese: 東部華僑城
Transcriptions
Standard Mandarin
- Hanyu Pinyin: Dōngbù Huáqiáochéng
Yue: Cantonese
- Jyutping: dung1 bou6 waa4 kiu4 sing4

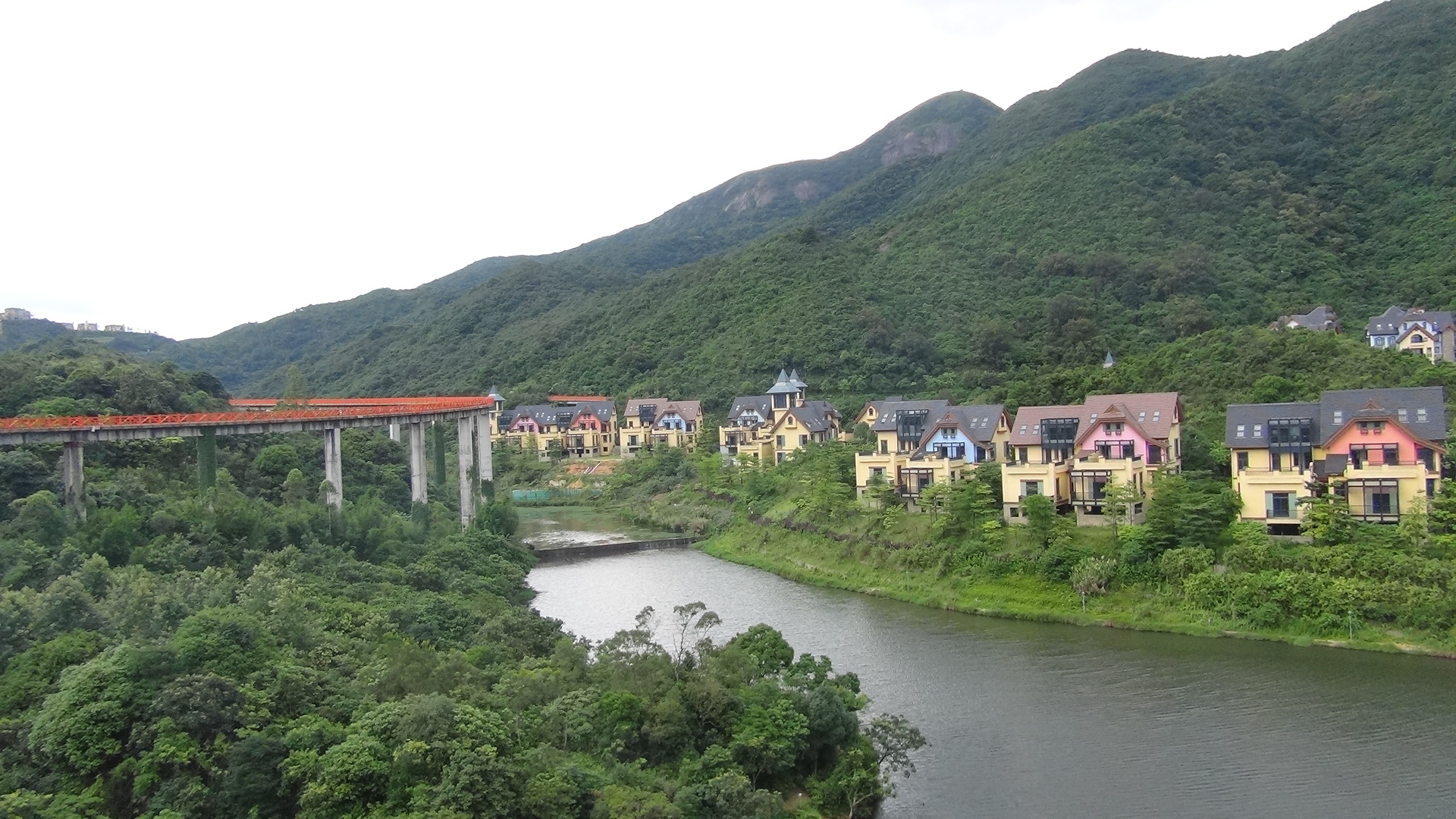
Tianlu (天麓) Mansions, holiday residences in OCT East

OCT East (Chinese: 东部华侨城) is a major entertainment and resort complex in Yantian, Shenzhen, China. It was constructed at a cost of CNY 3.5 billion and covers an area of nearly 9 km^{2} (900 ha; 3.5 sq mi; 2,200 acres). Construction started in 2004 and it was opened in 2007. It is divided into 3 theme parks, namely Knight Valley (大侠谷), Tea Stream Resort Valley (茶溪谷) and Wind Valley (云海谷) and features 8 hotels and a Buddhist Temple.

On 29 June 2010, a malfunction at a rocket ride killed six and injured ten. According to one victim, first responders took 20 minutes to reach her.

== See also ==
- Wood Coaster (Mountain Flyer), a roller coaster in Knight Valley
- Dameisha Beach, a neighboring beach resort
- List of parks in Shenzhen
