= Nanchang Sunac Land =

Theme park in Nanchang, Jiangxi, China

- Interactive map of Nanchang Sunac Land
- Location: Jiangxi, China
- Coordinates: 28.580°N 115.782°E
- Status: Operating
- Opened: May 28, 2009
- Operated by: Sunac China Holdings

Attractions
- Roller coasters: 5

Nanchang Sunac Land (Chinese: 南昌融创乐园; Pinyin: Nánchāng róng chuàng lèyuán) is a theme park in Nanchang, Jiangxi, China. It opened on 28 May 2009. It was the first theme park to be opened by the Sunac China Holdings group.

== Notable rides ==
Name	Type	Manufacturer	Model	Opened	Statistics	Ref
Coaster Through The Clouds	Steel	Intamin	Mega Coaster	28/5/2016	Height: 242.8 ft Speed: 84.5 mph Length: 5,105 ft	
Python in Bamboo Forest	Wood	Great Coasters International	Wood Coaster	28/5/2016	Total Height Difference: 160ft; Length: 5,111 ft Speed: 62.1 mph	
Soaring Dragon & Dancing Phoenix	Steel	Beijing Shibaolai Amusement Equipment	Suspended Loop Coaster	28/5/2016	Inversions: 6	
